= Starlink Aviation =

Canadian charter airline

IATA	ICAO	Call sign
Q4	TLK	STARLINK
- Founded: 1981
- Hubs: Montréal-Trudeau
- Fleet size: 19
- Headquarters: Dorval, Quebec, Canada
- Website: http://www.starlinkaviation.com/

Starlink Aviation is a Canadian charter airline and a fixed-base operator. It is based at the Montréal–Trudeau International Airport in Dorval, Quebec.

Starlink acquired Canada's first Pilatus PC-24.

== History ==
Starlink Aviation was founded as a fixed-base operator at then Dorval International Airport in 1981 as Avionair and was renamed in 1999. The company acquired a fleet of turboprop and jet aircraft, and began leasing them as private aircraft to clients.

In 2003, the company also began a scheduled "corporate shuttle" service from Montreal with its BAe Jetstream 31 aircraft to the cities of Alma and La Baie (Bagotville) in Quebec, Canada. These services were later discontinued in 2009 and 2013 respectively. In April 2008, Starlink announced a partnership with the American fractional jet company Flight Options to form "Flight Options Canada", expanding the charter networks of both companies.

In January 2009, service by Starlink Airlines between Yarmouth, Halifax, Nova Scotia and Portland, Maine was announced, with two flights daily, beginning February 4 of the same year. On December 1, 2009, service ceased due to depletion of the Air Service Fund.

== Aircraft ==
As of December 2024, Starlink has the following 19 aircraft registered with Transport Canada:

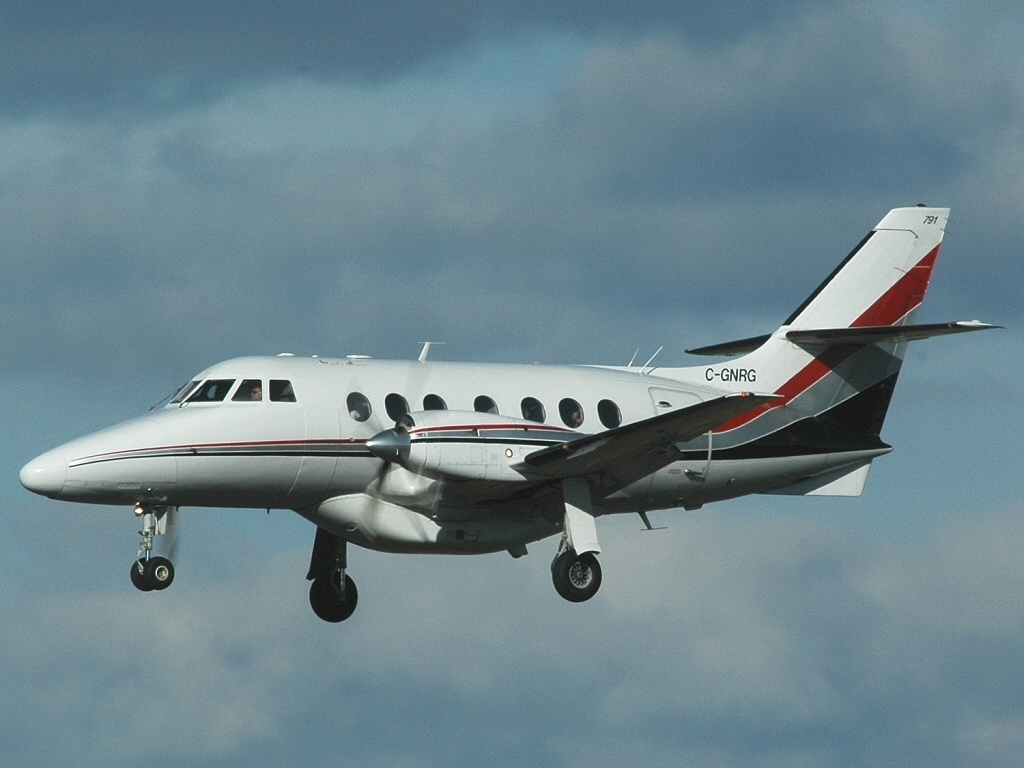
A British Aerospace Jetstream formerly operated Starlink Aviation as an air ambulance

Starlink Aviation aircraft
Aircraft	No. of aircraft	Variants	Notes
Beechcraft Super King Air	1	300	
Bombardier Challenger 300	2	BD-100	
Bombardier Challenger 600	1	604	
Bombardier Global Express	2	BD-700	
Dassault Falcon 6X	1		
Dassault Falcon 20	2	200	
Embraer Phenom 300	1	EMB-505	
Learjet 45	4	-	
Pilatus PC-12	2	47E	
Pilatus PC-24	2	-	
Raytheon 850	1	850XP	
Total	19		

=== Former aircraft ===
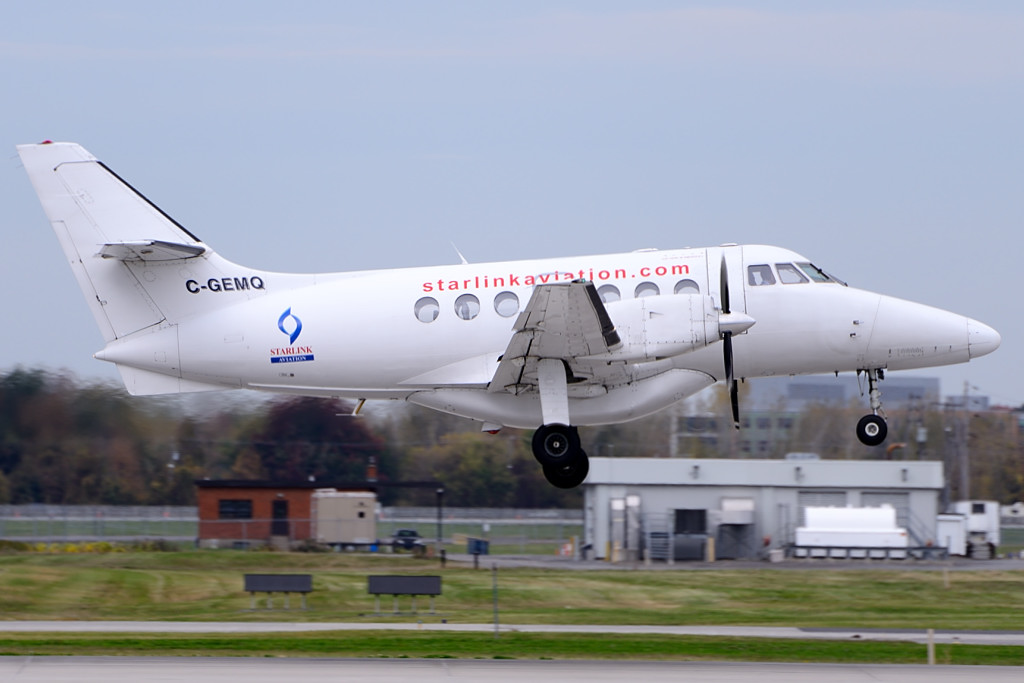
British Aerospace Jetstream formerly operated Starlink Aviation

Starlink Aviation has previously operated the following aircraft:

- Beechcraft King Air
- Beechcraft Super King Air 200
- Beechcraft 1900
- Boeing 737
- British Aerospace Jetstream
- Cessna 208 Caravan
- Cessna Citation I
- Dassault Falcon 900
- Embraer EMB 120 Brasilia
- Embraer EMB 500
- Hawker Siddeley HS-125
- Learjet 60
- Piaggio P.180 Avanti
- Swearingen Merlin
