= Air New England (charter airline) =

- Founded: 2011
- Operating bases: Portsmouth, New Hampshire
- Destinations: Point-to-point
- Parent company: Port City Air, Inc.
- Headquarters: Portsmouth, New Hampshire, U.S.
- Website: www.airnewengland.com

Air New England, LLC is an FAR Part 135 certified Air Carrier that primarily operates twin-engine passenger aircraft in the United States and Canada. Their corporate headquarters are located at Portsmouth International Airport in Portsmouth, New Hampshire.

== Operations ==
Air New England primarily operates point-to-point charter air service in the Greater New England area with operations based out of Portsmouth, NH.

During the summer season, Air New England operates near-daily service between New York City, Boston, and destinations in Maine.

== Fleet ==
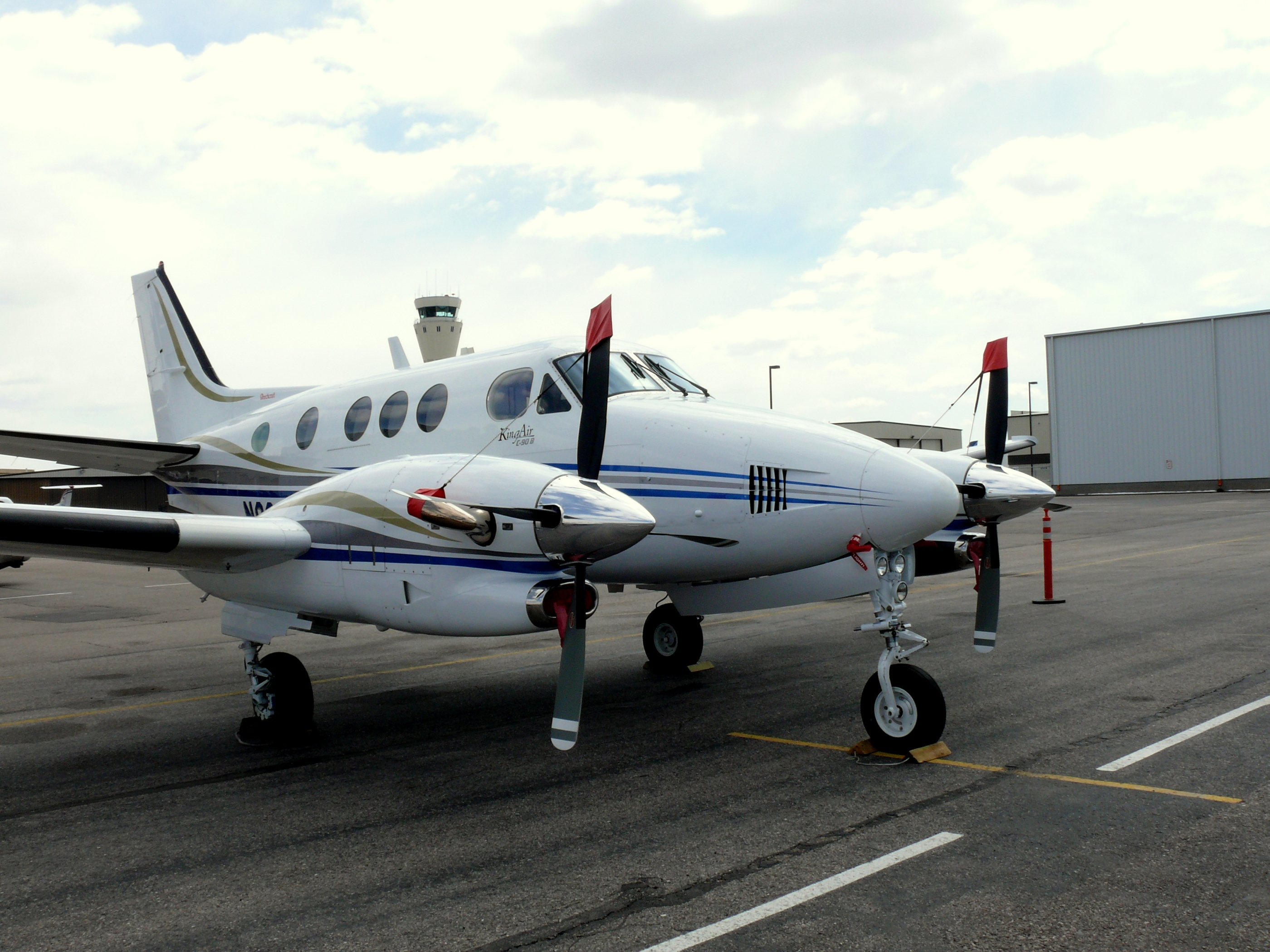
A King Air C90 similar to those flown by Air New England

Air New England operates a fleet of twin-engine passenger aircraft consisting primarily of Beechcraft Baron 58 and Beechcraft King Air C90 aircraft. The company announced the introduction of a Cessna Citation Mustang very light jet to their fleet in 2024.

	Beechcraft Baron 58	Beechcraft King Air C90	Cessna Citation Mustang C510
Passengers	Up to 5	Up to 7	Up to 4
Airspeed	210 mph	260 mph	390 mph
Range	950 miles	1100 miles	1300 miles

== Accidents and incidents ==
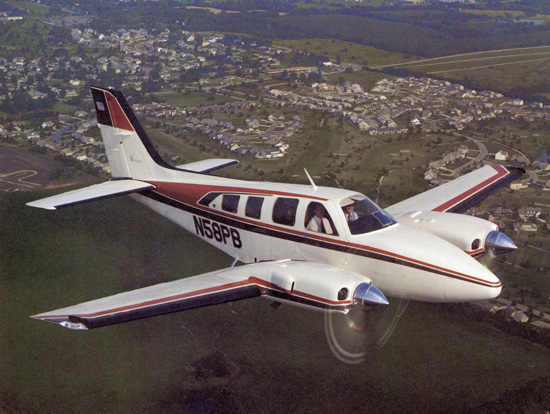
A Baron 58 similar to those flown by Air New England

On 12 July 2018, an Air New England Baron 58 (Registration No.N263AC) on a non-commercial training flight made a wheels-up landing at Portland International Jetport. While there were no injuries, and the aircraft did not catch fire, the incident did result in a 90-minute closure of the airport causing many flights to either be delayed, diverted to other airports, or cancelled while the aircraft was removed from the airfield and a check was done of the runway.

On 19 April 2022, an Air New England Baron 58 (Registration No.N100JP) flying under the company's Part 91 certificate struck multiple runway edge lights during its takeoff roll. This incident did not result in any injuries, however the aircraft sustained significant damage including damage to both propellers as well as significant shrapnel damage to its fuselage and landing light.
