= PlaneSense =

Airline of the United States

IATA	ICAO	Call sign
—	CNS	CHRONOS
- Founded: 1995
- Fleet size: 70
- Destinations: Point to point
- Parent company: Cobalt Air, LLC
- Headquarters: Portsmouth, New Hampshire
- Key people: George A. Antoniadis
- Website: http://www.planesense.com

PlaneSense is a fractional aircraft ownership program managed by PlaneSense, Inc. and based in Portsmouth, New Hampshire, United States. As of July 2025, they managed a civilian fleet of 70 total program aircraft made up of 49 Pilatus PC-12 aircraft and 21 Pilatus PC-24 jets. The PlaneSense fractional program provides private air transportation, primarily within the United States, Canada, Mexico, The Bahamas, the islands of the Caribbean and more recently, Cuba. PlaneSense guarantees departure times as soon as eight hours after a flight request, depending on the size of the aircraft share owned for domestic flights on non-peak days. PlaneSense, inc. is not, itself, an air charter provider or commercial air carrier, but charter flights can be arranged through its sister company, Cobalt Air.

== History ==
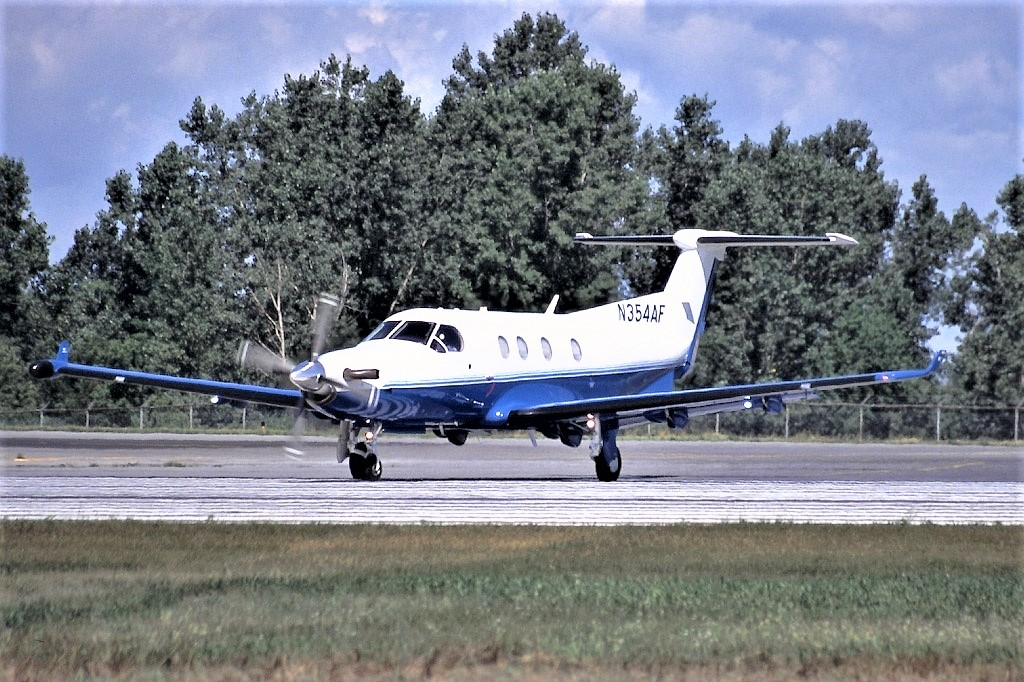
Alpha Flying (Plane Sense) Pilatus PC-12

PlaneSense, Inc., formerly named Alpha Flying, Inc., was founded in 1992. The name was changed on 1 February 2012 to PlaneSense, Inc.. Originally based in Norwood, Massachusetts, Alpha Flying, Inc. was founded by George Antoniadis, initially as a supplemental program to the then Alpha Flying Club, which provided rental and management of high performance piston and turbine powered general aviation aircraft. In 1995, the PlaneSense program was founded, with the first Pilatus PC-12 delivered on 9 September 1995. In 1998, they moved to a facility at Nashua Airport. In 2000, they moved to a facility at Manchester-Boston Regional Airport. In 2007, they moved to a new custom built facility at Portsmouth International Airport at Pease in Portsmouth, New Hampshire.

The PlaneSense program achieved steady growth since its inception 25 years ago, and it has recently surpassed significant flight benchmarks. Notably, it has exceeded the milestone of 440,000 flight hours.,

In 1994, George Antoniadis arranged a visit to Pilatus Aircraft Stans, Switzerland, to view their new turboprop model - the PC-12. He reviewed the PC-12, analyzed its operating characteristics and soon became convinced that it was the airplane he'd been seeking. He placed an order in September 1995 and took delivery of the 20th Pilatus PC-12 off the assembly line.

The Pilatus PC-24 jet entered service in early 2018, with PlaneSense taking delivery of the first production model. Building on the success of the Pilatus PC-12 turboprops, the PC-24 aims to offer PC-12 versatility with turbojet powered performance. PlaneSense is the launch customer with a preliminary order for six jets under contract. Before taking delivery of the PC-24, PlaneSense purchased four Nextant 400XTi aircraft, but now the jet program is dedicated to the PC-24 fleet.

=== Fleet ===
PlaneSense fleet (aircraft registered to Cobalt Air)
Aircraft	Total	Passengers
Pilatus PC-12	49	6
Pilatus PC-24	21	8
Totals	70	---

The PlaneSense total fleet size is listed under their Part 135 operating certificate Cobalt Air, LLC.

== Accidents and incidents ==
- January 6, 2016 - A Pilatus PC-12, registration N978AF crashed shortly after takeoff from Savanah Hilton Head International Airport after a misinterpreted torque indication resulted in the pilots making a precautionary landing in a field nearby. The landing and subsequent fire destroyed the aircraft. There were no fatalities.
- August 29, 2026 - A Pilatus PC-12, registration N653AF, sustained substantial structural damage while parked at Portsmouth International Airport at Pease after a 17-year-old driver fleeing from New Hampshire State Police rammed through the airport’s perimeter fence. The vehicle struck an unoccupied ground tractor before colliding with the parked aircraft, collapsing its landing gear and severing its left wing. No PlaneSense personnel were injured, and flight operations were uninterrupted.

== See also ==
- Fractional ownership of aircraft
- AirSprint
- Flexjet
- NetJets
