= Jet Republic =

- Company type: Private jet company
- Industry: Airline
- Founded: 2008–2009
- Founder: Jonathan Breeze
- Headquarters: Lisbon, Portugal
- Key people: Jonathan Breeze, Viktor Popovic, Andrew Hiscock
- Services: Private Jet Shared Ownership and Private Jet Card
- Website: http://www.jetrepublic.com

Jet Republic was a privately held company jet company that offered private jet cards and share ownership (sometimes known as fractional ownership). It was closed in 2009.

== Launch ==
Jet Republic launched in September 2008, with a press event held at Farnborough Airport, where the company announced a $1.5 billion (£815 million) private jet order.

The order for 110 Learjet 60XR mid-size jets from Bombardier was reported by The Guardian to be largest ever for the aircraft manufacturer, with a service aimed at entrepreneurs and high-net-worth individuals. Talking to The Guardian, Jet Republic’s founder and CEO Jonathan Breeze said, "The kind of customers we cater for will be continuing to run their businesses around Europe and could find themselves wanting to use private jets as the main airlines cut routes and services.”

However, on August 20, 2009, Bombardier announced that the contract had been terminated for the entire quantity of aircraft. No reason for the termination was made public at that time.

== Services ==
Jet Republic's private jet club offered members two programs: share ownership and the private jet card.

- Share ownership was for jet owners to purchase or lease a fractional share of a Learjet 60 XR by only paying for an aircraft share equal to the hours they needed, starting at 50 hours a year. This program allowed owners the benefits of private jet travel without the management responsibilities or the large initial capital investment. In addition it offered a buy-back option at the end of the contract.
- Jet Republic’s Private Jet Card allowed card members access to flight time by purchasing 25 hours or more without any further commitment. This program offered the benefits of private aviation with the simple pricing structure of a one-off payment. In addition all Jet Republic members were able to fly anywhere in the world through its partnerships with other operators. Hours on the Private Jet Card never expired and unused hours were refunded at any time.

The Financial Times reported that Jet Republic intended to differentiate its offering by “flying the aircraft with a flight attendant as standard, a service usually provided only on larger executive jets, and with hot meals and fresh espresso coffee. Passengers will also have in flight BlackBerry connectivity.”

== Non-future of the company ==
Irish bookmaker Paddy Power offered bets on whether Jet Republic would still be in business on 1 January 2010.

In an interview with the Financial Times, in April 2009, Breeze said that the company's first aircraft would be delivered in 2009 and the company was on target for $150 million turnover, raising to $350 million in 2010.

Jet Republic said on 20 July 2009 it would cut the price of its aircraft hire Jet Card by 14% to €99,000 (£85,192).
