= Portsmouth International Airport at Pease =

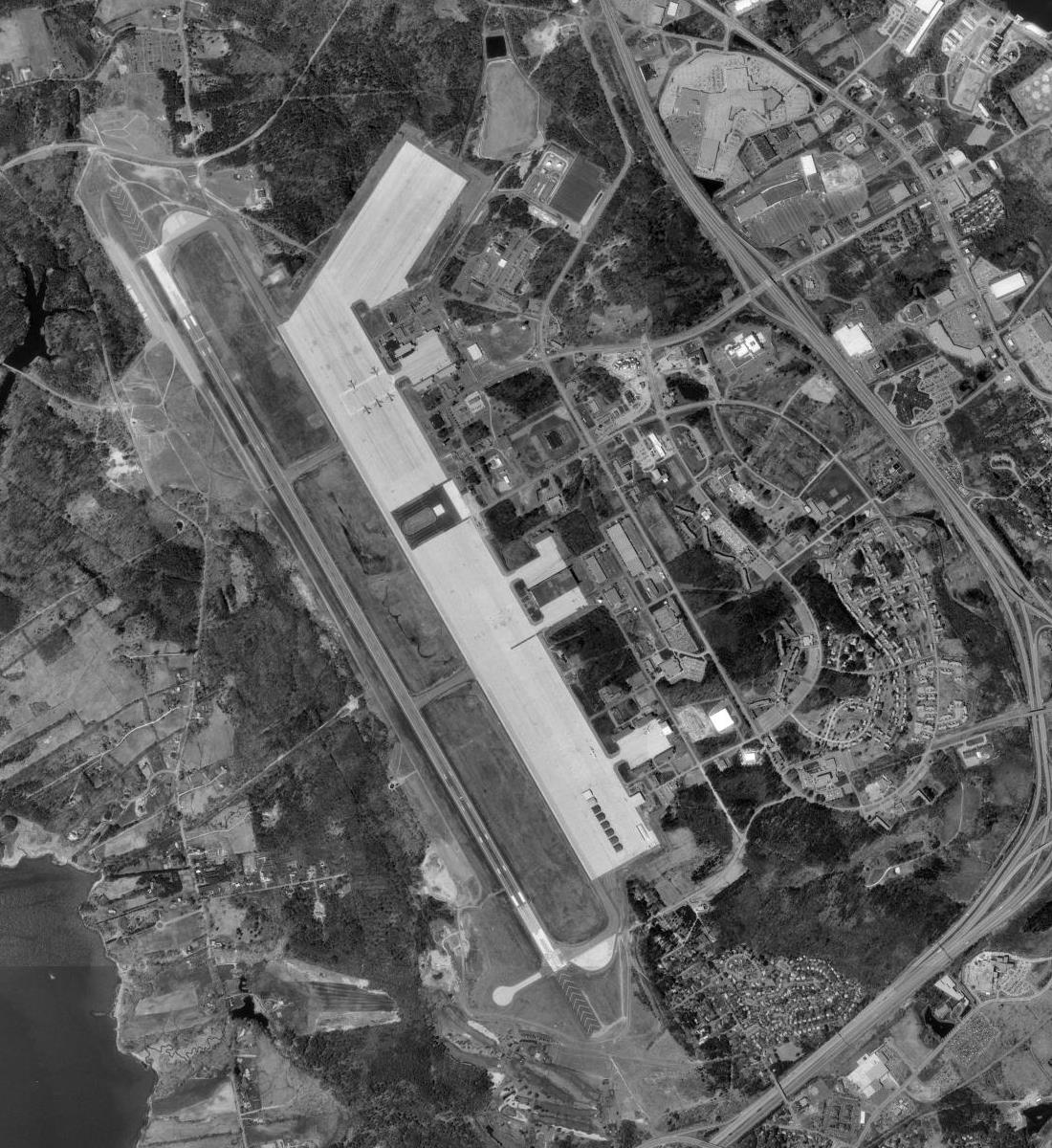
- USGS 1998 orthophoto
- IATA: PSM; ICAO: KPSM; FAA LID: PSM

Summary
- Airport type: Public / military
- Owner: Pease Development Authority
- Serves: Seacoast Region of New Hampshire, Southern Maine
- Location: Portsmouth / Newington, New Hampshire, USA
- Elevation AMSL: 100 ft (30 m)
- Coordinates: 43°04′41″N 070°49′24″W
- Website: FlyPSMairport.com

Maps
- FAA airport diagram
- Interactive map of Portsmouth International Airport at Pease

Runways
Direction	Length		Surface
Direction	ft	m	Surface
16/34	11,322	3,451	Asphalt/concrete

Statistics (2019)
- Aircraft operations (year ending September 30, 2019): 42,282
- Based aircraft: 132
- Sources: airport website and FAA

Portsmouth International Airport at Pease (IATA: PSM, ICAO: KPSM, FAA LID: PSM), formerly known as Pease International Airport, is a joint civil and military use airport located one nautical mile (2 km) west of the central business district of Portsmouth, a city in Rockingham County, New Hampshire, United States. It is owned by the Pease Development Authority. It is included in the Federal Aviation Administration (FAA) National Plan of Integrated Airport Systems for 2017–2021, in which it is categorized as a non-hub primary commercial service facility.

The airport is located within the Pease International Tradeport, a result of the ongoing redevelopment of the former Pease Air Force Base which was closed under Base Realignment and Closure (BRAC) Commission action in the late 1980s and early 1990s.

== Usage ==
=== Military ===
The airport shares its runway with the Pease Air National Guard Base, which is actively utilized by the 157th Air Refueling Wing (157 ARW) of the New Hampshire Air National Guard, an Air Mobility Command (AMC)-gained Air National Guard unit operating KC-46A Pegasus aerial refueling tankers. The 64th Air Refueling Squadron (64 ARS), an active duty Air Force unit of the 22nd Air Refueling Wing (22 ARW) at McConnell AFB, is embedded and located with the 157 ARW at Pease ANGB.

Pease was one of seven Launch Abort Sites and one of 18 Emergency Landing Sites for NASA Space Shuttle orbiters.

=== Civilian ===
Domestic and international terminal passenger service by the third iteration of Pan American Airways began in 1999 and lasted until the airline's demise in 2004. This version of Pan American (also known as "Pan Am III") had its corporate offices located in Portsmouth and in 2001 was operating Boeing 727-200 jet service nonstop and also direct one stop to Orlando Sanford International Airport in Florida in addition to nonstop flights to Bangor, Maine and Worcester, Massachusetts with direct service also being offered to San Juan, Puerto Rico via Orlando.

Other scheduled passenger airlines included Business Express Airlines operating Delta Connection service via a code sharing agreement on behalf of Delta Air Lines in the early 1990s, Allegiant Air (2005–2007), and Skybus Airlines (2007–2008). In early 1994, Business Express operating as the Delta Connection was operating up to fourteen flights every weekday into the airport with nonstop and direct one stop services from Boston (BOS), New York LaGuardia Airport (LGA) and New York Newark Airport (EWR) flown with Beechcraft 1900, Saab 340 and Short 360 commuter turboprops.

The January 1994 OAG lists nonstop service from New York Newark Airport being operated twice every weekday by Atlantic Coast Airlines flying United Express service via a code sharing agreement on behalf of United Airlines with British Aerospace BAe Jetstream 31 commuter propjets. Frontier Airlines began offering service to their hub in Orlando, Florida in December 2018, but abandoned the route after only 6 months.

In October 2013, Allegiant Air returned and offers nonstop jet service flown with Airbus aircraft to several destinations. An expanded passenger terminal opened in January 2021, for customers of Allegiant Air.

In July 2024, Breeze Airways announced service to Orlando, Florida and Fort Myers, Florida beginning in October to Portsmouth, utilizing the Airbus A220 on both routes.

The airport is the base for PlaneSense, a company that offers fractional aircraft ownership programs.

== Facilities and aircraft ==
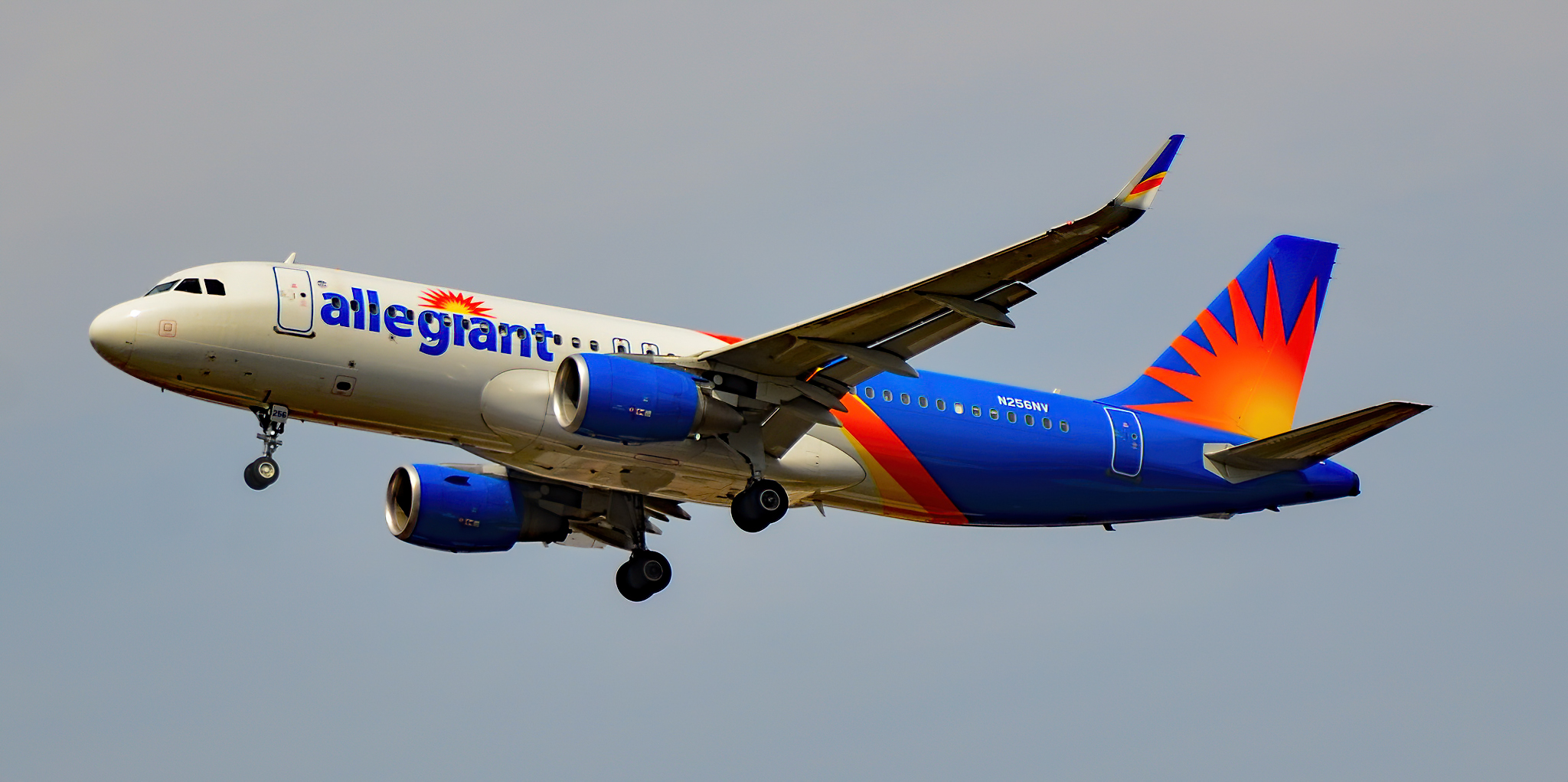
Allegiant Air offers scheduled passenger service out of Pease.

Portsmouth International Airport at Pease covers an area of 3,000 acres (1,200 ha) at an elevation of 100 feet (30 m) above mean sea level. It has one concrete and asphalt paved runway designated 16/34 which measures 11,322 by 150 feet (3,451 x 46 m).

For the 12-month period ending September 30, 2019, the airport had 98,282 aircraft operations, an average of 269 per day: 68% general aviation, 10% military, 17% air taxi and 4% scheduled commercial. At that time there were 132 aircraft based at this airport: 96 single-engine, 12 multi-engine, 16 jet, 6 helicopter and 2 military.

In May 2019, the Pease Development Authority approved a $24 million runway reconstruction project, which was completed in September 2020.

In December 2021, work was completed on a $19.5 million passenger terminal expansion project. Improvements included an updated and expanded passenger state-of-the-art holding area with floor-to-ceiling windows providing passengers with vast views of the entire runway, a dedicated baggage screening room with new conveyor belts and an automatic X-ray baggage scanning system for TSA personnel, more expedient and advanced screening capabilities through the addition of a second security station for improved passenger flow, about 4,000 square feet of upgraded concession space with conventional bar and high top table seating, a new gate and second jet bridge to allow seamless processing of two jets coming in and out at the same time if needed, and an indoor service animal relief area (SARA) room.

== Airlines and destinations ==
Airlines	Destinations
Allegiant Air	Orlando/Sanford, Punta Gorda (FL), Sarasota; Seasonal: Fort Lauderdale (begins February 20, 2027), St. Petersburg/Clearwater
Breeze Airways	Fort Myers, Myrtle Beach (begins May 26, 2027), Orlando, Raleigh/Durham

Destinations map
All destinations from Portsmouth International Airport at Pease (PSM)
Red = Year-round destination
Green = Seasonal destination
Blue = Future destination
Purple = Suspended destination

== Statistics ==
=== Top destinations ===
Busiest domestic routes from PSM (August 2025 – July 2026)
Rank	Airport	Passengers	Airlines served
1	Punta Gorda, Florida	35,560	Allegiant
2	Orlando–Sanford, Florida	19,690	Allegiant
3	Orlando–International, Florida	7,280	Breeze
4	Raleigh–Durham, North Carolina	7,090	Breeze
5	Clearwater, Florida	6,290	Allegiant
6	Fort Myers, Florida	4,470	Breeze
7	Sarasota, Florida	1,860	Allegiant

=== Airline market share ===
Largest airlines at PSM (August 2025 – July 2026)
Rank	Airline	Passengers	Share
1	Allegiant	127,000	78.16%
2	Breeze	35,320	21.74%

Count includes enplaned arriving and departing passengers.

=== Annual traffic ===
Annual traffic
	Passengers	Change from previous year	Cargo landed weight (lbs.)
2000	37,786	N/A	89,369,840
2001	37,235	▲1.5%	25,476,012
2002	34,841	▼6.4%	148,880
2003	27,096	▼22.2%	1,673,642
2004	22,279	▼17.8%	2,522,877
2005	7,312	▼67.2%	1,893,004
2006	26,065	▲356.5%	5,459,076
2007	58,057	▲122.7%	2,054,080
2008	49,962	▼13.9%	2,246,340
2009	17,079	▼65.8%	3,417,444
2010	10,257	▼40.0%	1,413,000
2011	2,012	▼80.38%	18,992,900
2012	13,517	▲571.8%	11,050,312
2013	22,540	▲66.8%	8,247,636
2014	45,708	▲102.8%	19,313,869
2015	45,933	▲0.5%	4,150,632
2016	73,247	▲59.5%	2,492,318
2017	105,077	▲43.5%	2,517,435
2018	92,836	▼11.7%	4,760,040
2019	116,903	▲25.9%	9,914,976
2020	41,737	▼64.3%	2,243,479
2021	66,972	▲60.5%	2,919,413

== Accidents at or near PSM ==
Civilian aircraft incidents at or near the airport, per National Transportation Safety Board (NTSB) records:

- On April 10, 1993, a Cessna 172 traveling from Greater Binghamton Airport (BGM) in New York to Beverly Regional Airport (BVY) in Massachusetts diverted to PSM due to low visibility, made several attempts to land, and ultimately crashed in nearby Durham, New Hampshire, after running out of fuel; the pilot was seriously injured. Another pilot had taken off from Lawrence Municipal Airport (LWM) in Massachusetts in an attempt to guide the plane to safety.
- On October 9, 2004, a Cessna 172M traveling from Bar Harbor Airport (BHB) in Maine to Skyhaven Airport (DAW) in Rochester, New Hampshire had to land in a corn field in nearby Eliot, Maine, after running out of fuel; neither the pilot or passenger were injured. The pilot had been unable to land at Skyhaven due to low visibility and was en route to PSM when the incident occurred.

A number of incidents, some with fatalities, occurred during military use of the facility.

== See also ==
- List of airports in New Hampshire
