= AirSprint =

Canadian fractional aircraft ownership company

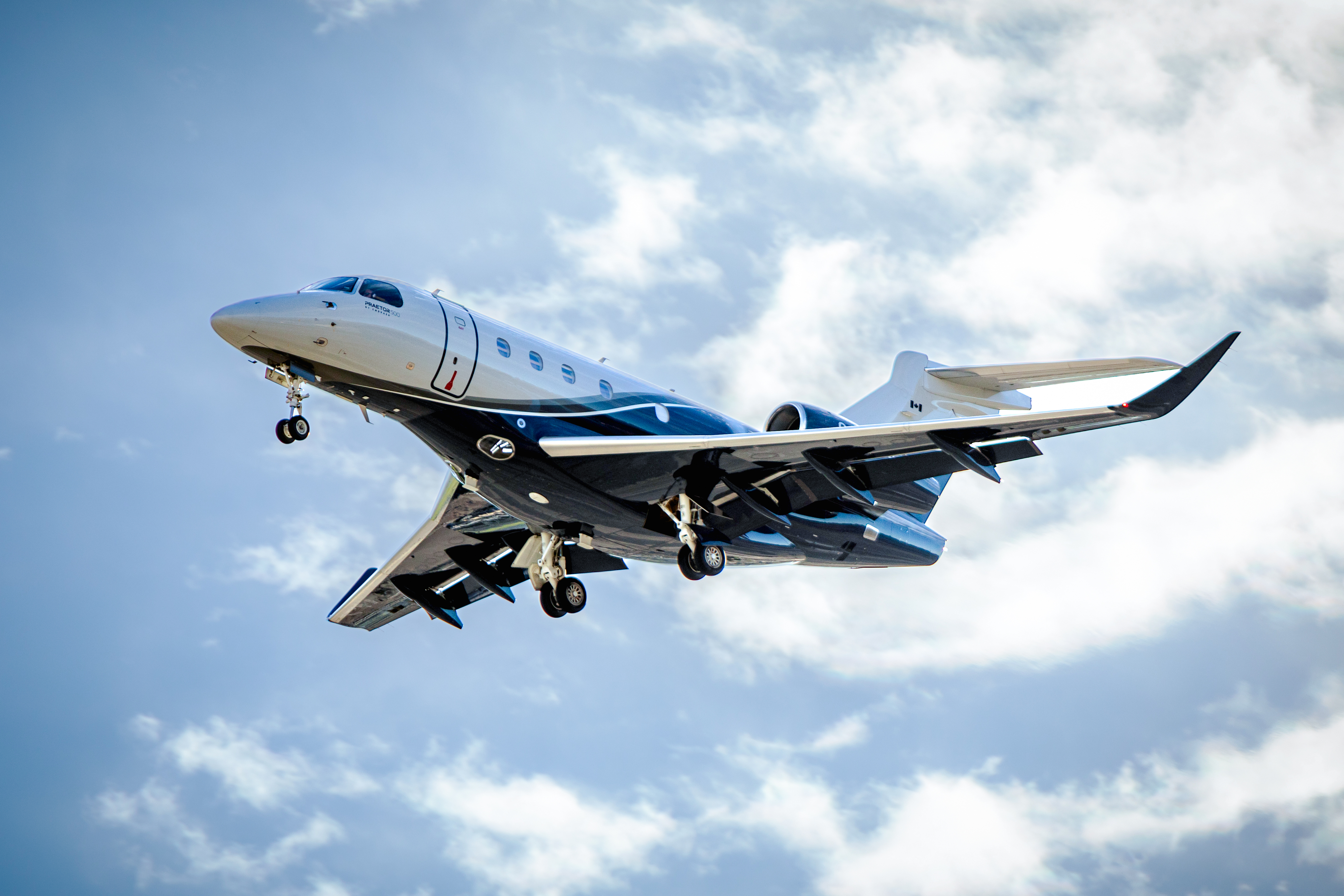
- An Embraer Praetor 500 private jet
| IATA | ICAO | Call sign |
|---|---|---|
| — | ASP | AIRSPRINT |
- Founded: 2000
- AOC #: Canada: 11653; United States: R52F012F
- Hubs: Vancouver, Edmonton, Calgary, Winnipeg, Toronto, Ottawa, Montreal and the Maritimes
- Fleet size: 43
- Headquarters: Calgary, Canada
- Key people: Judson Macor (Founder & Chairman), James Elian (President & CEO)
- Website: https://www.airsprint.com

AirSprint is a Canadian company that offers fractional ownership and management of private business jet aircraft. Today, AirSprint operates the youngest fleet of fractional aircraft in North America and is the largest provider of fractional aircraft in Canada.

== History ==
AirSprint was founded in 2000 by Judson Macor as Canada's first fractional aircraft ownership company.

In 2017, AirSprint was the fastest growing fractional aviation company globally. ARGUS International listed AirSprint as the No. 6 fractional ownership company on the continent, thanks in part to a 23.5 percent jump in its total flight hours over the previous year.

In 2025, AirSprint celebrated its 25th anniversary of operations.

== Fleet ==
De-icing an AirSprint Legacy 450 at Edmonton International Airport

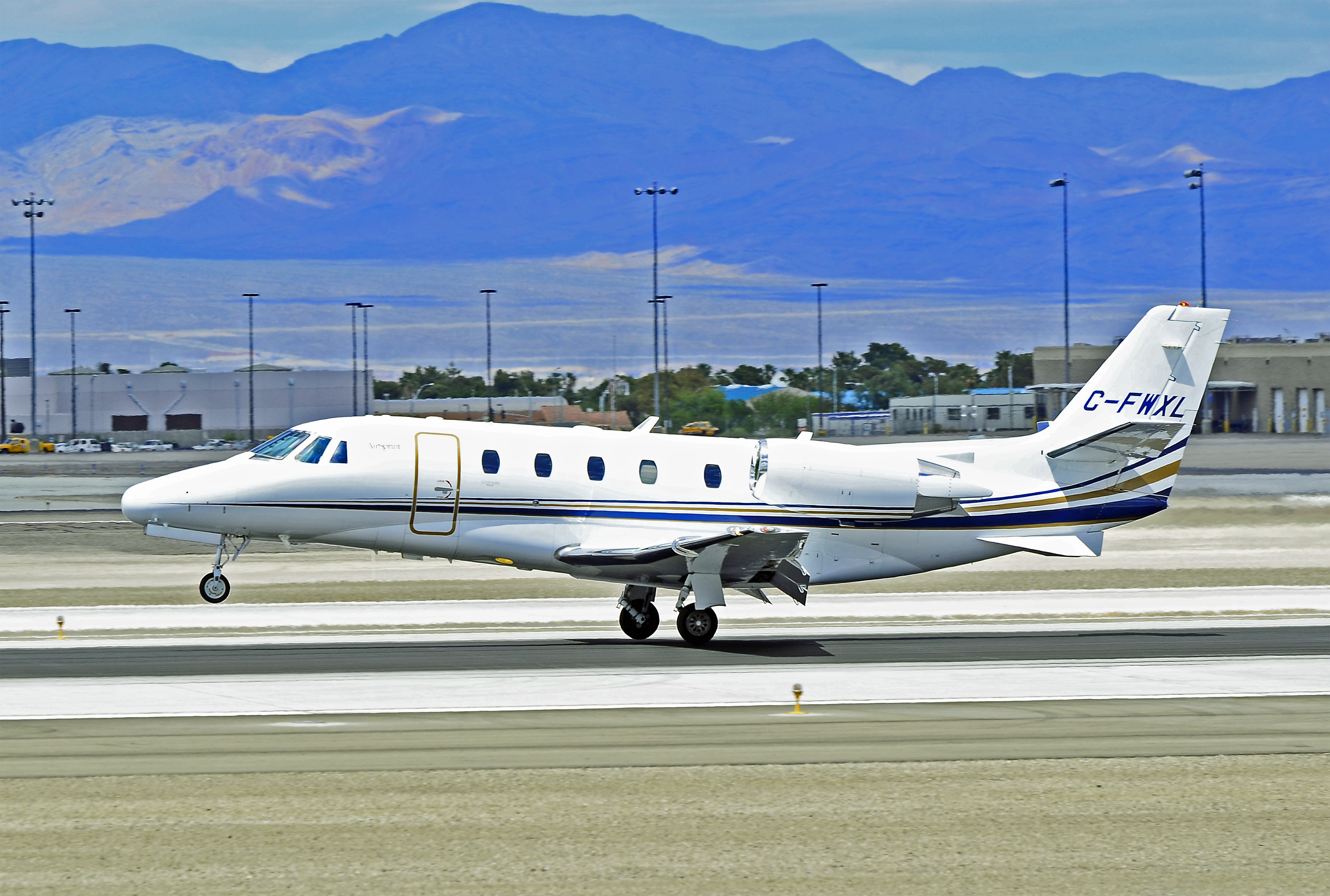
Formerly owned Cessna 560XL at McCarran International Airport

As of 1 February 2026 the AirSprint fleet consists of the following aircraft:

AirSprint fleet
| Aircraft | No. of aircraft | Variants | Notes |
|---|---|---|---|
| Cessna CitationJet/M2 | 26 | 6 - Model 525A (CJ2+); 20 - Model 525B (CJ3+) | Up to six passengers in the CJ2+. Up to seven passengers on the CJ3+. Light twin-engine business jets. |
| Embraer Legacy / Praetor | 17 | 5 - EMB-550 (Legacy 500); 12 - EMB-545 (Legacy 450) | Mid-sized twin engine business jets. Up to nine passengers in the both aircraft. |
| Total | 43 | | |

== See also ==
- Flexjet
- PlaneSense
- NetJets
