= NetJets =

World's largest private business jet charter and aircraft management company

NetJets Aviation

- A NetJets Bombardier Challenger 350
IATA	ICAO	Call sign
-	EJA	EXECJET
- Founded: 21 May 1964 (62 years ago); United States
- AOC #: DXTA401D
- Subsidiaries: NetJets Aviation, Inc.; NetJets Europe; QS Partners; QS Security Services
- Fleet size: 792 total, 668 Netjets US, 124 Netjets Europe (April 2025)
- Destinations: Point to point
- Parent company: Berkshire Hathaway
- Headquarters: Columbus, Ohio, United States
- Key people: Chairman and CEO: Adam Johnson; President of NetJets Aviation: Patrick Gallagher
- Employees: 7,000
- Website: www.netjets.com

NetJets Inc. is an American company that sells fractional ownership shares in private business jets.

Founded as Executive Jet Airways in 1964, it was later renamed Executive Jet Aviation. NetJets became the first private business jet charter and aircraft management company in the world. It launched its fractional ownership business in 1986 and became a subsidiary of Berkshire Hathaway in 1998.

== History ==
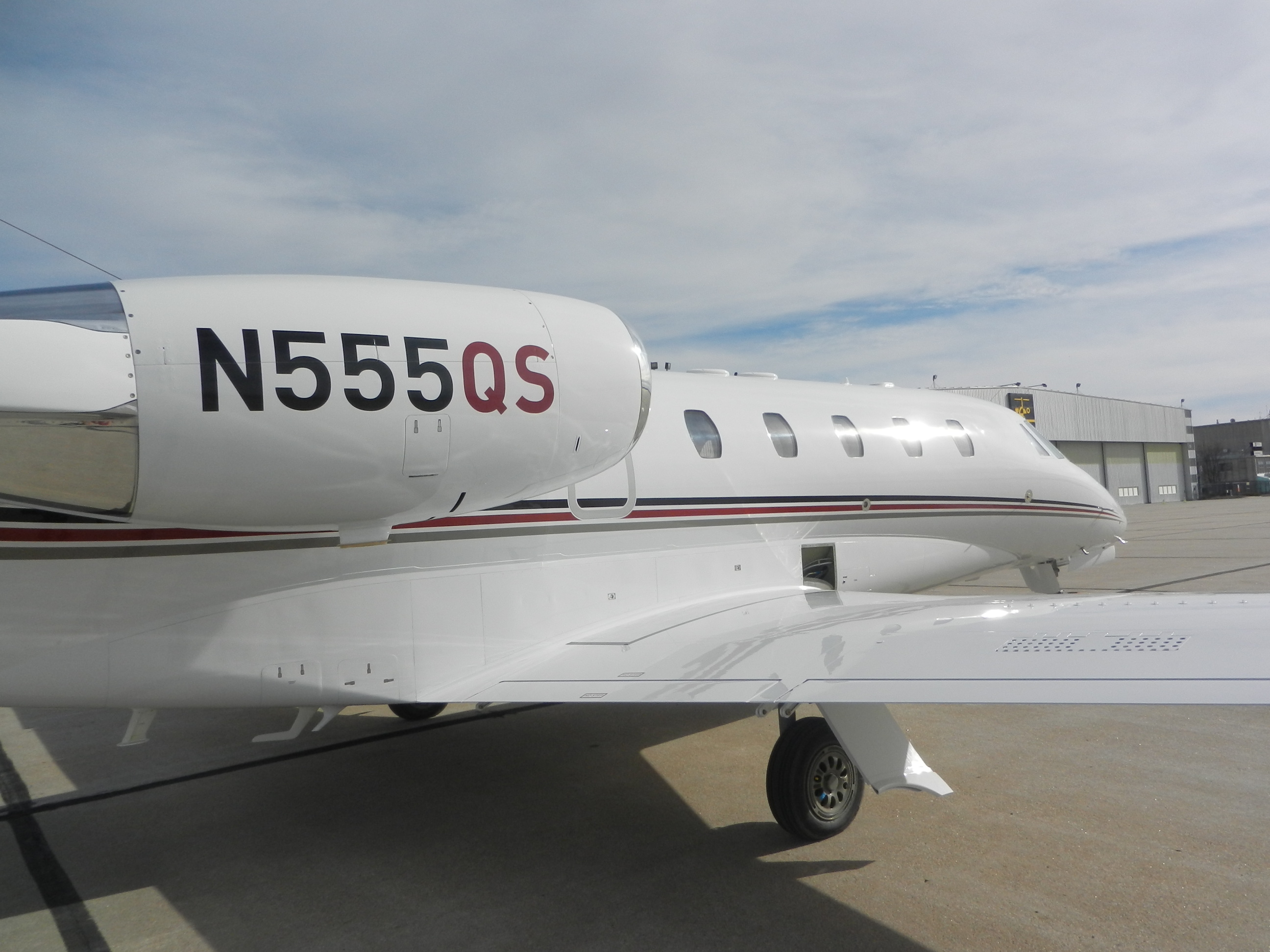
NetJets aircraft all have the same paint scheme, their US registration ends in "QS" (for quarter share)

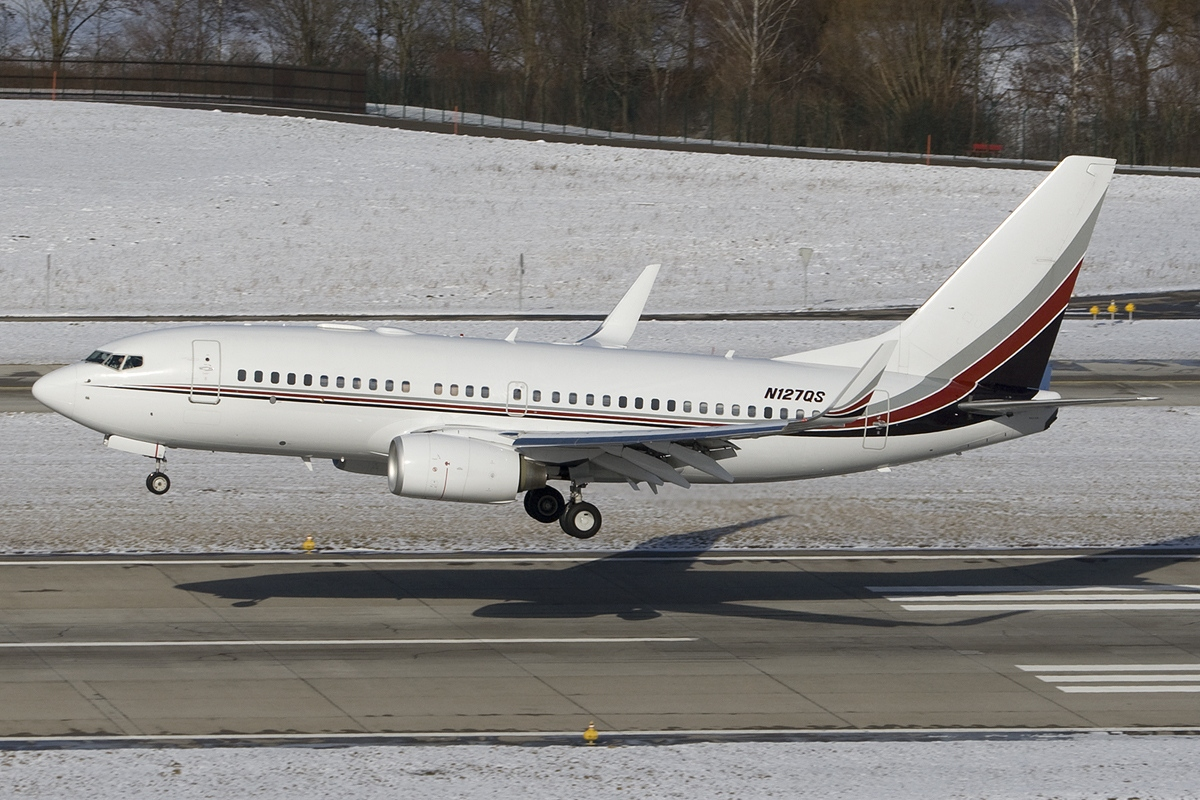
A NetJets Boeing Business Jet 737-700 that the company formerly operated, photographed in 2009

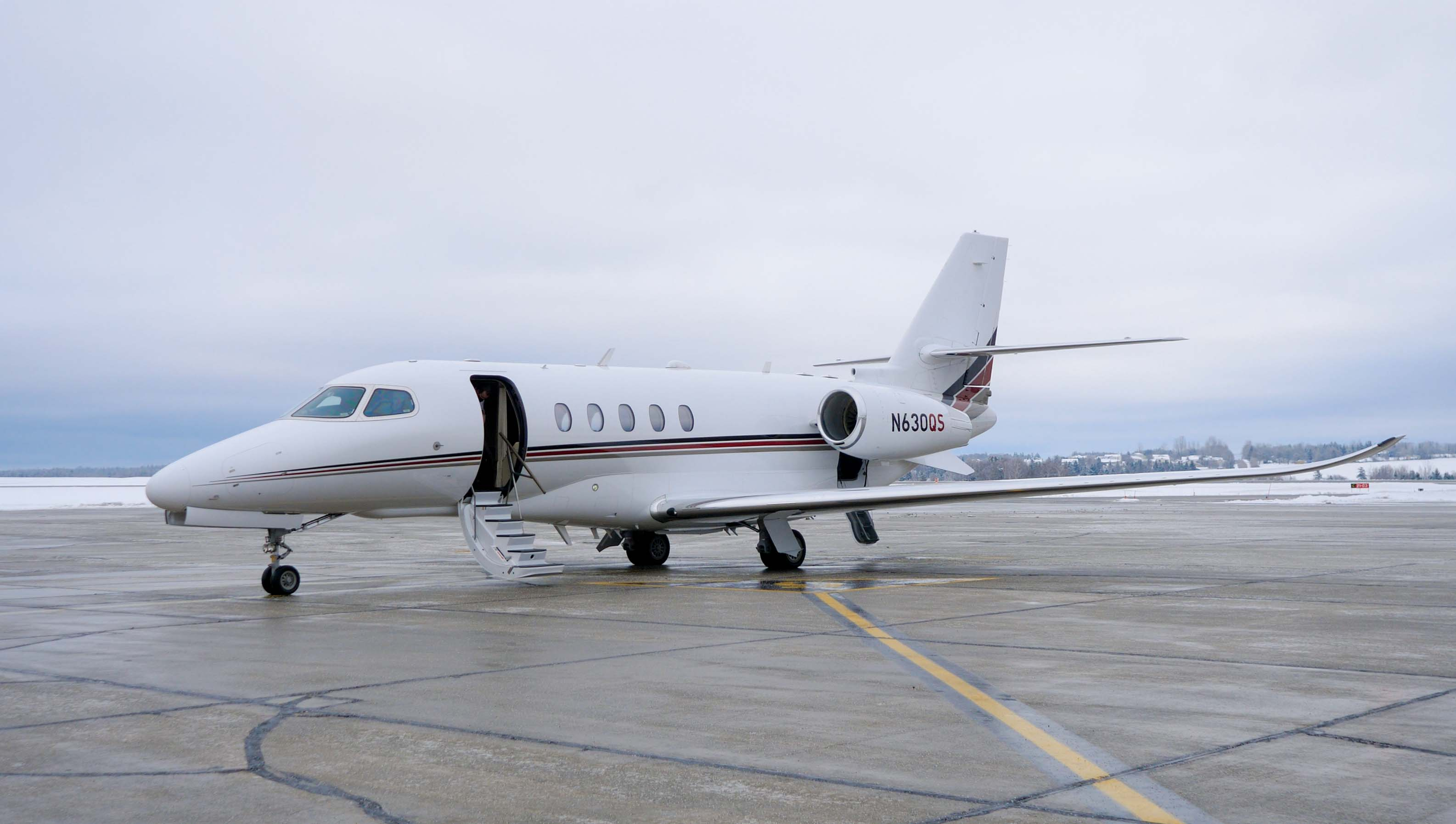
A Netjets Citation Latitude in 2020

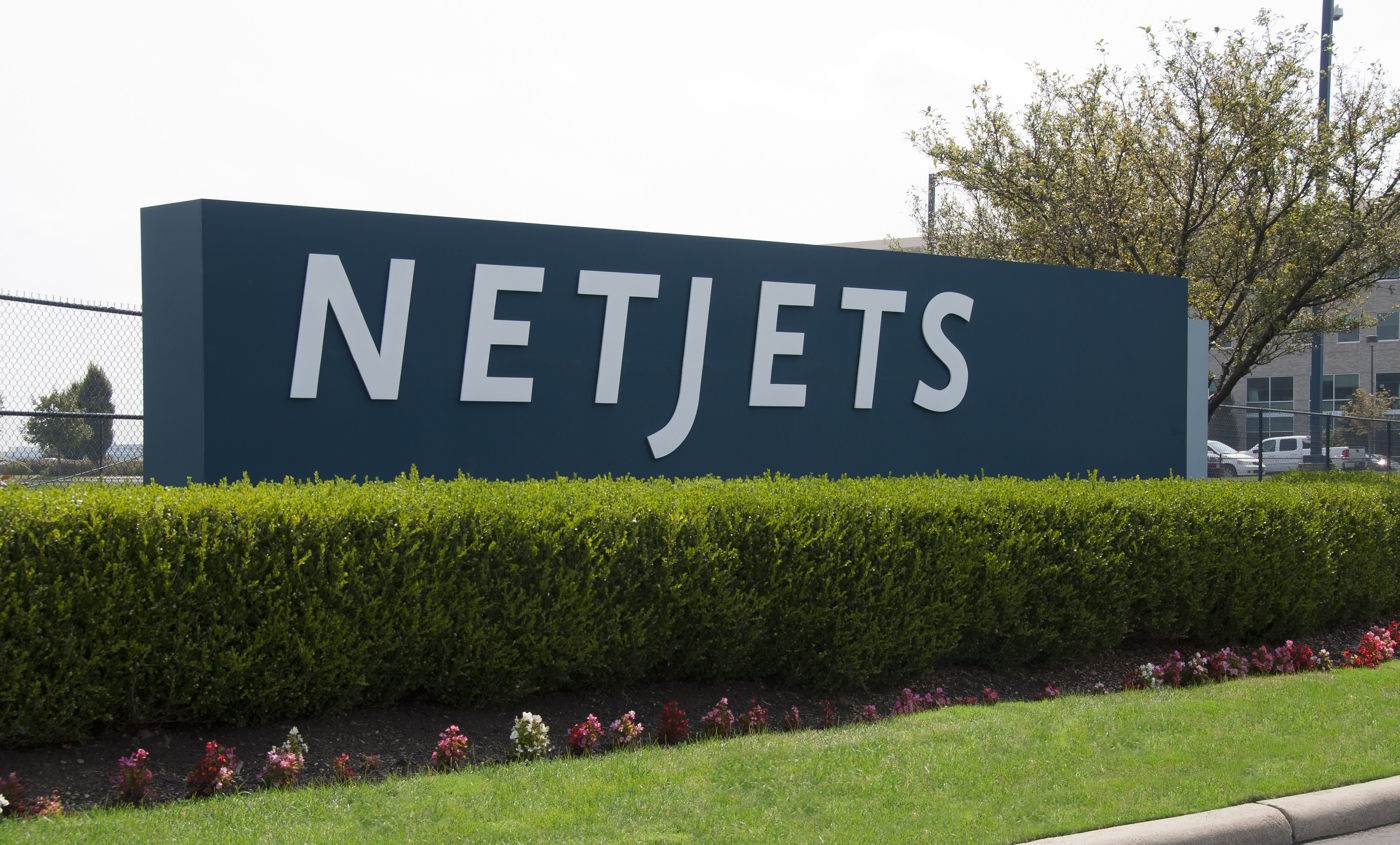
NetJets headquarters sign

=== 1960s ===
The company was founded in 1964 and originally known as Executive Jet Airways. The name was later changed to Executive Jet Aviation (EJA), and again in 2002 to NetJets, after Berkshire Hathaway purchased it in 1998. NetJets was the first private business jet charter and aircraft management company in the world. The idea came from retired Air Force Brigadier General Olbert F. "Dick" Lassiter, who had experience running the Air Mission Squadron, an air taxi service for the Air Force. The idea was to run a similar service for private companies, with a pool of corporate jets providing transportation instead of each company having to purchase and maintain their own plane. The founding members of the board of directors included US Air Force generals Curtis E. LeMay and Paul Tibbets, Washington lawyer and former military pilot Bruce Sundlun, and entertainers and pilots James Stewart and Arthur Godfrey, with Lassiter serving as president and chairman of the board.

Shortly after its founding, EJA began receiving regular investments from the Pennsylvania Railroad (PRR), which were managed by accountant David Bevan. In June 1965, the railroad purchased a majority of shares in EJA, despite the fact that rail carriers were barred from owning air carriers by the Federal Aviation Act of 1958. To hide the investments from the PRR board, Bevan made the payments through a subsidiary, the American Contract Company, which he was president of.

EJA initially began operations in 1964 with a fleet of ten Learjet 23 aircraft. The company soon moved to acquire competitors and larger aircraft, including two 707 jets and two 727 jets from Boeing, but these could not be operated in revenue service without being an airline, so EJA attempted to buy Johnson Flying Service (JFS), a small Montana charter airline. EJA even negotiated an order for Lockheed L-500s, the nascent civil version of the C-5 Galaxy, contingent on acquiring JFS, which required approval from the Civil Aeronautics Board (CAB), the now-defunct Federal agency that, at the time, tightly controlled almost all commercial air transport. The PRR argued its EJA stake was legal as it consisted of non-voting stock. Anticipating CAB approval, EJA licensed its larger jets to foreign airlines. But the CAB saw PRR's involvement as illegal, EJA found itself deeply unprofitable, and the PRR attempted to sell off its stake. However, potential buyers lost interest after corporate spies for Pan Am acquired and leaked information on EJA's illegal interests. The PRR merged into Penn Central in 1968, and the search for a buyer continued. Penn Central and EJA were ultimately fined $70,000 by the CAB in 1969.

In 1970, the trustee for Penn Central's EJA shares voted to oust Lassiter and replace him with Bruce Sundlun. On July 1, the day before he was voted in as president, Sundlun led a midnight raid on EJA's corporate offices with the assistance of Pinkertons. Lassiter attempted to retake the office with armed guards of his own shortly after, but they were stopped by Sundlun's guards. Lassiter was later sued for his role in diverting $21 million of PRR money into EJA, much of which had gone to his personal expenses. Sundlun, Robert L. Scott Jr. and Joseph S. Sinclair bought out the Penn Central interest in EJA in 1972 and stabilized the company's finances. Paul Tibbets became president in 1976.

=== 1980s ===
In 1984, Executive Jet Aviation was purchased by mathematician and former Goldman Sachs executive Richard Santulli who owned a business that leased helicopters to service providers of offshore oil operations. When Santulli became chairman and CEO of the corporation, he closely examined 22 years of pilot logbooks, and began to envision a new economic model where several individuals could own one aircraft.

In 1987, the NetJets program was officially announced becoming the first fractional aircraft ownership format in history. The majority of NetJets' US aircraft have registrations ending with QS, symbolizing the concept of selling quarter shares of an aircraft.

=== 1990s ===
In 1998, Berkshire Hathaway acquired EJA and NetJets Inc from Richard Santulli for US$725 million, half of which was paid in stock. NetJets soon expanded to Europe and then Russia, and by 2006, it was the largest operator of business jets in Europe.

=== 2000s ===
The company operated a fleet of nine Boeing 737-700 Boeing Business Jets in the mid-2000s, since then sold off.

In early August 2009, Santulli resigned as CEO and was replaced by David Sokol. Shortly afterward, NetJets moved its corporate headquarters from New Jersey back to its original home in Columbus, Ohio.

=== 2010s ===
In 2010, NetJets acquired Marquis Jet from founders Jesse Itzler and Kenny Dichter. The prepaid Marquis Jet card allowed customers to purchase 25 hours of guaranteed flight time on the NetJets fleet.

On 11 June 2012, NetJets placed the largest aircraft order in private aviation history totaling US$17.6B. The company placed a firm order for 30 Bombardier Global 5000/6000 jets, 25 Bombardier Challenger 650 jets, 75 Bombardier Challenger 350s, 25 Cessna Citation Latitudes and 50 Embraer Phenom 300s. As a part of this purchase agreement, it also placed conditional orders for an additional 40 Bombardier Global 5000/6000s, 50 Bombardier Challenger 650, 125 Bombardier Challenger 350s, 125 Cessna Citation Latitudes and 75 Embraer Phenom 300s. As a result of these orders NetJets became Cessna's largest business jet fleet owner.

In September 2014, NetJets acquired approval to launch its aircraft charter service in China, having worked with Chinese authorities since 2012 to secure the operating certificate.

In 2015, the company's pilots picketed the Wynn resort in Las Vegas where company owner Warren Buffett was hosting some of his wealthiest customers. The event was symbolic of deteriorating labor relations within the company at this time.

The Internal Revenue Service (IRS) had sought back taxes and penalties of $643 million from NetJets for periods beginning in 2003, including on its maintenance and service fees. NetJets filed a lawsuit challenging the IRS assessments. In January 2015, the United States District Court issued a decision in NetJets' favor, holding that the IRS assessments were unlawful.

In 2019, a former NetJets pilot filed a lawsuit alleging that in March 2017, the company violated US Civil Right and Ohio anti-discrimination law when she was fired for being too short (5 feet 2 inches (157 cm)) to properly control the rudders of an Embraer Phenom 300. She stated that male pilots who were too tall were reassigned to different aircraft, while her employment was terminated without the opportunity to fly a different plane. An Ohio federal judge ruled in favor of NetJets in 2022, citing the plaintiff's failure to prove sex discrimination.

=== 2020s ===
In the spring of 2020, the company saw a boom in demand, as wealthy individuals sought to avoid the risks of airline flying during the COVID-19 pandemic. Previously, many potential customers had concerns about the optics of opulence and the environmental issues of private jet transport, but NetJets President of Sales, Marketing and Service, Patrick Gallagher noted in May 2020, that the health risks associated with flying on commercial airlines during the pandemic had trumped those concerns. The company introduced regular employee COVID-19 testing to try to contain the risks of an outbreak on its aircraft.

In October 2020, the company made initial moves to reduce its carbon footprint. The company committed to buying "up to 3 million gallons" (11.4 million litres) of sustainable aviation fuel to be used at two of its bases, San Francisco and Columbus, Ohio. The company is also encouraging its customers to buy carbon offsets for their flights. The company will also buy its own offsets for its administration and training flights.

As of November 2020, almost half of the company's fleet was manufactured by Textron, and the rest by Bombardier Inc. and Embraer. After reducing its delivery target for 2021 by more than half, due to decreased demand caused by the COVID-19 pandemic in 2020, the company expected to take delivery of 40 new aircraft in 2021 in anticipation of industry recovery.

In February 2021, the company purchased a stake in WasteFuel, a business that will convert landfill waste into sustainable aviation fuel (SAF). NetJets plans to purchase 100 million gallons of SAF from WasteFuel over the next 10 years as part of the deal.

In March 2021, NetJets announced that it had ordered 20 Aerion AS2s supersonic business jets. The memorandum of understanding between NetJets and Aerion called for the two companies to operate a larger "Aerion Connect" network. Aerion abruptly announced its closure on 21 May 2021, due to the inability to raise the needed capital to continue.

The company announced in March 2022, that it would partner with Lilium GmbH to establish an eVTOL network in Florida. NetJets will buy 150 Lilium Jets and operate them under a FAR Part 135 charter operation. In October 2024 Lilium filed for insolvency.

NetJets announced in September 2023, that it will be purchasing up to 1,500 Cessna Citation jets from Textron Aviation. Deliveries for this 15-year deal are expected to begin in 2025.

== Subsidiaries ==
NetJets Europe, also known by its corporate legal name, NetJets Transportes Aéreos, S.A., was launched in 1996 as a sister company of NetJets and is now a subsidiary. It is based in Oeiras, Portugal, and serves more than 5,000 airports globally.

NetJets Europe
IATA	ICAO	Call sign
—	NJE	FRACTION
- Founded: 6 December 1996 (29 years ago); Portugal
- AOC #: N60F996F
- Fleet size: 124
- Destinations: Point to point
- Parent company: NetJets
- Headquarters: Lisbon, Portugal
- Key people: CEO: Mario Pacifico

Also among NetJets subsidiaries is Executive Jet Management (EJM), based in Cincinnati, Ohio, which offers aircraft management and charter services. QS Partners is the whole-aircraft brokerage arm of NetJets, launched in 2016 and officing in Columbus, Ohio; Boulder, Colorado; and London; it also exclusively resells used aircraft from NetJets' fleet. QS Security Services was launched by NetJets in October 2019 with "tiered security packages" based on passenger needs and threat level at destination. Initially only available at Paris Le Bourget and in Mexico, future plans include worldwide coverage by 2023.

== Business model ==
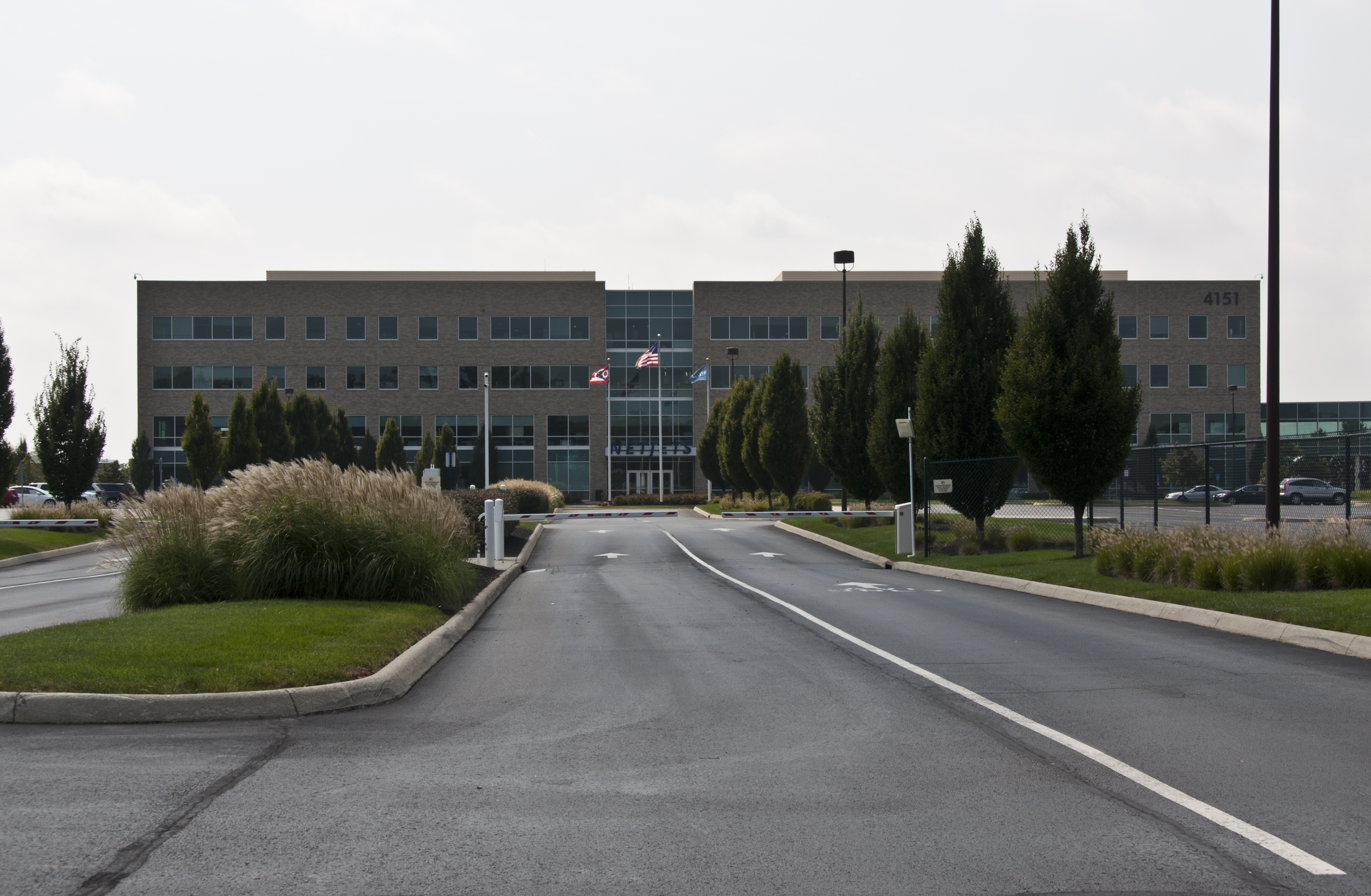
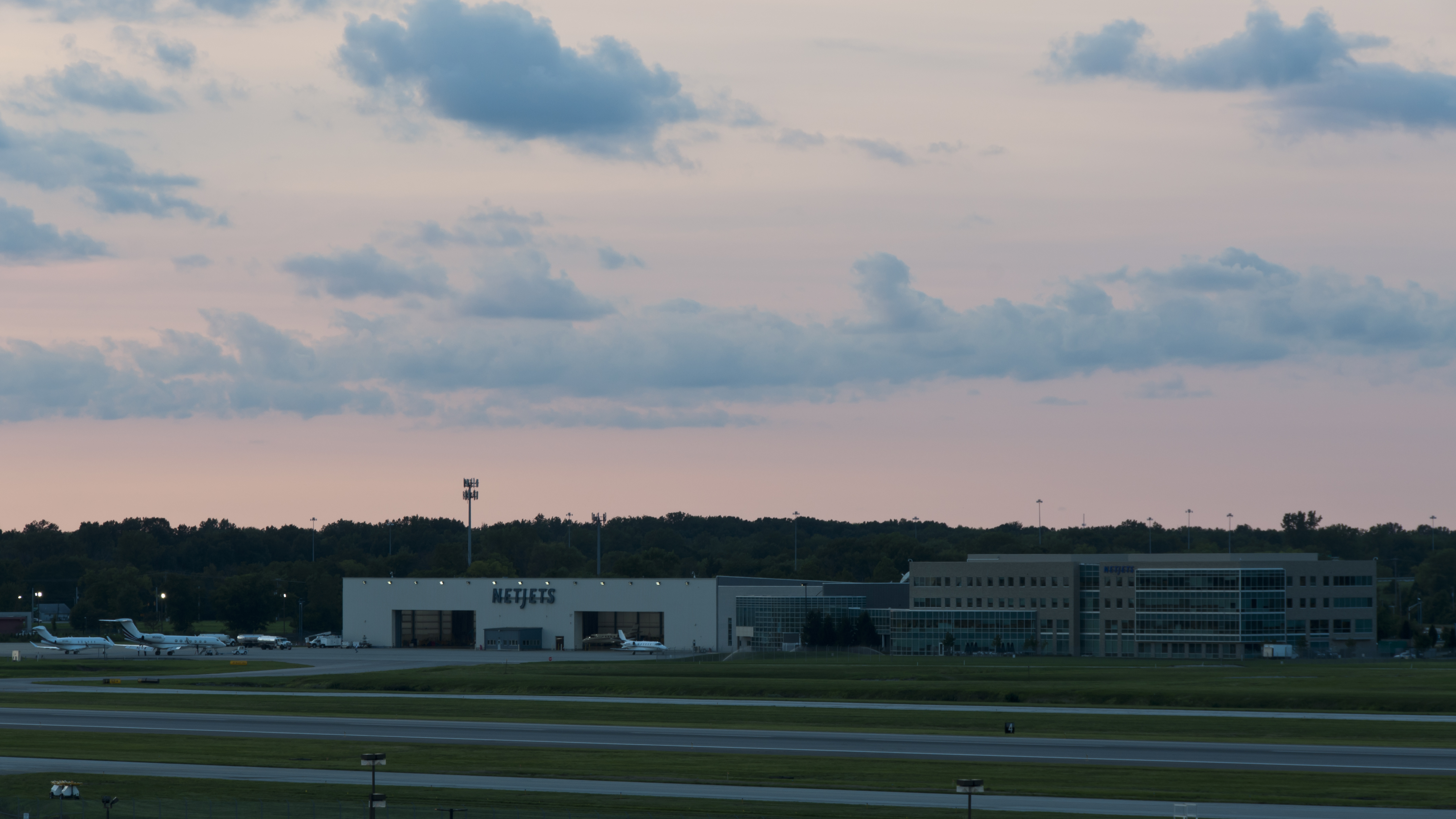
NetJets headquarters at John Glenn Columbus International Airport.

NetJets sells fractions of specific aircraft, chosen from several available types at the time of purchase. Owners then have guaranteed access (50–400 hours annually, depending on share size) to that aircraft with as little as four hours' notice. If the owner's aircraft is unavailable for some reason, another aircraft of the same type, or a larger aircraft, will be provided.

Fractional owners pay monthly maintenance fees for a minimum of 50 annual flight hours and a five-year commitment, as well as operating fees by the hour for use of aircraft. Alternatively, customers may buy flight hours in 25-hour increments by way of jet card programs. Fractional owners also pay an occupied hourly operating fee, but it is charged only when an owner or guest is on board, not for ferry flights.

NetJets is the largest fractional aircraft provider. In 2021 its fleet flew 478,444 hours.

For companies or individuals that require less than the minimum 50 flight hours and the five-year commitment of fractional ownership, they can buy flight hours in 25-hour increments via the NetJets jet card programs. Due to a surge in demand for private aviation during the COVID-19 pandemic, NetJets suspended its card program in August 2021. Sales restarted in March 2023. This program features "blackout" days, when service is not available due to expected high demand, such as on holidays or during major sporting events.

== Fleet ==
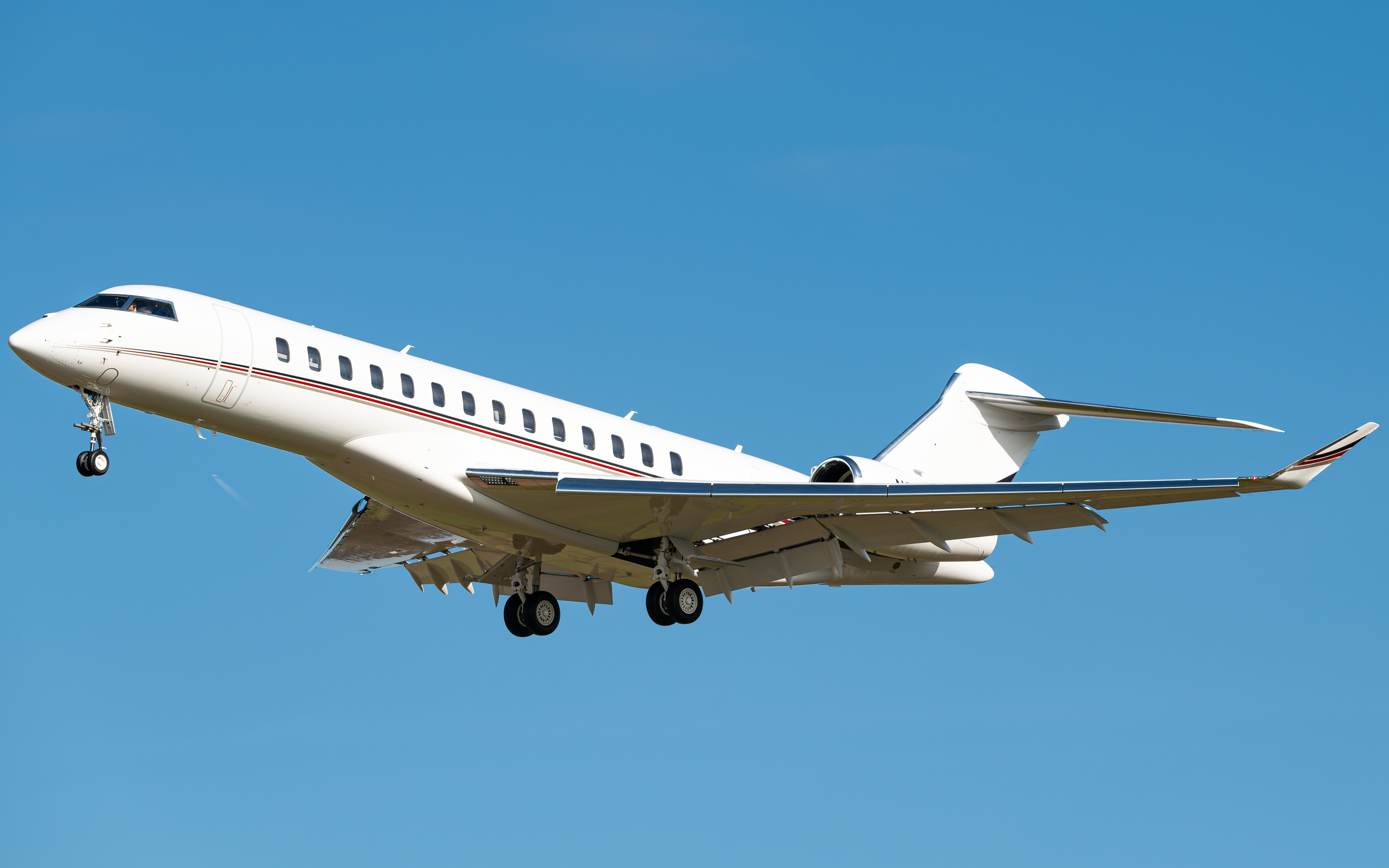
NetJets Bombardier Global 7500

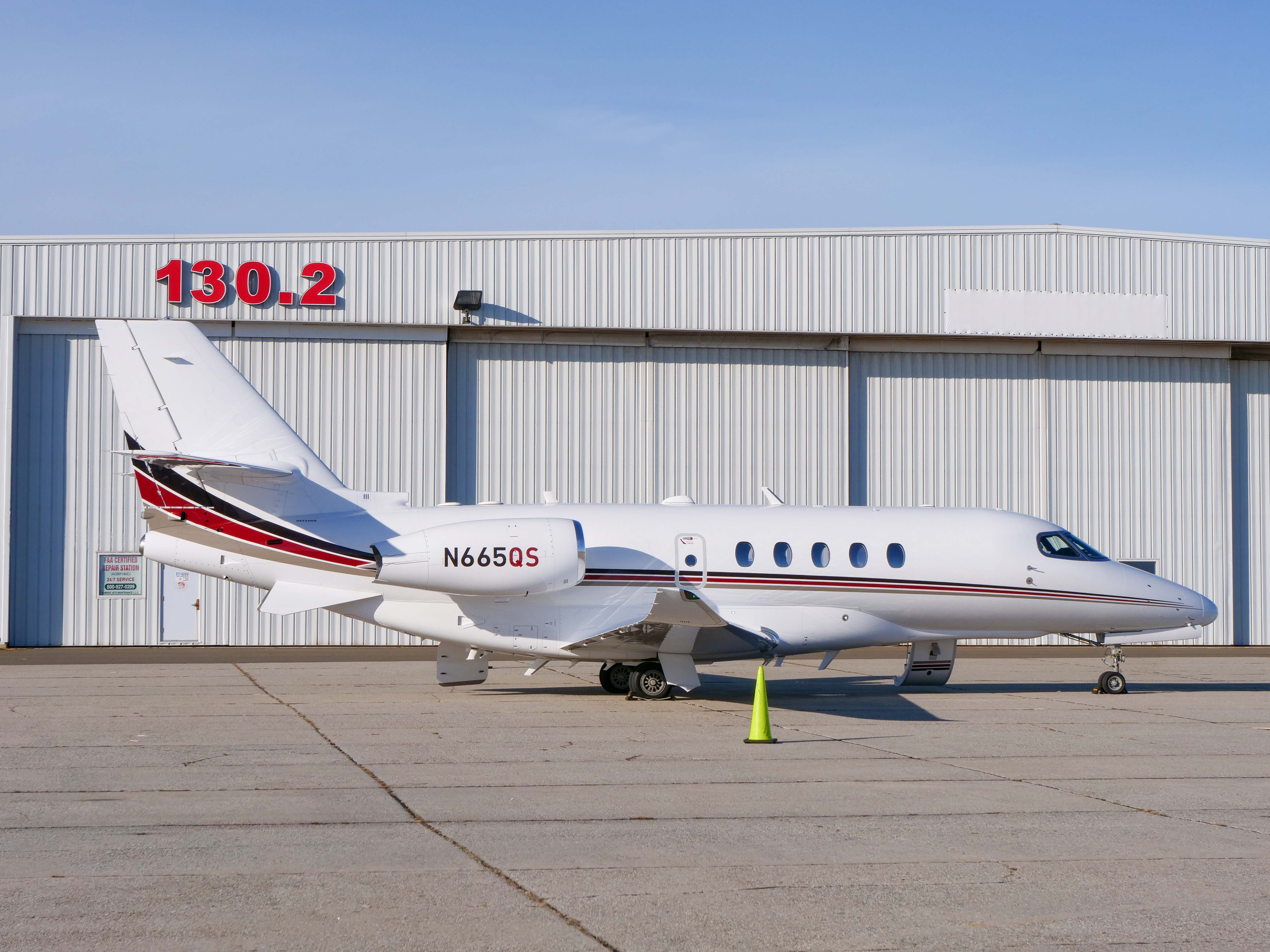
NetJets Cessna Citation Latitude

NetJets is the largest private jet operator in the world. The data below is limited to aircraft registered on the United States operating certificate.

Additional aircraft not included in this data exist within the NetJets Europe, and Executive Jet Management fleet. The NetJets fleet:

Aircraft Type	Number of Aircraft
Embraer Phenom 300	154
Embraer Praetor 500	19
Cessna Citation XLS / Ascend	55
Cessna Citation Sovereign	25
Cessna Citation Latitude	253
Cessna Citation Longitude	86
Bombardier Challenger 350/3500	87
Bombardier Challenger 650	58
Bombardier Global 5000	19
Bombardier Global 5500	11
Bombardier Global 6000	37
Bombardier Global 7500	18
Bombardier Global 8000	1
Total Aircraft	811

As of November 2025, NetJets' global fleet included more than 800 aircraft.

== Accidents and incidents ==
NetJets reported incidents
Date	Flight	Aircraft	Location	Description	Fatal	Serious	Minor	Uninjured
9 May 1970	N434EJ (flying as Executive Jet Aviation)	Learjet 23	Pellston, Michigan	Controlled flight into terrain while landing at Pellston-Emmet County Airport (IATA: PLN, ICAO: KPLN, FAA LID: PLN). UAW President Walter Reuther, his wife May, and architect Oscar Stonorov were killed in the crash.	6	—	—	—
22 January 1999	N782QS(flying as Executive Jet Aviation)	Cessna 650 Citation VII	Columbus, Ohio	During a training flight, the aircraft was landing at Port Columbus International Airport (IATA: CMH, ICAO: KCMH, FAA LID: CMH), when the right main landing gear collapsed. Two certificated airline transport pilots, a company pilot, and a company intern were on board. Inadequate design of the landing gear was found to be the probable cause.	—	—	—	4
2 May 2002	N397QS	Cessna Citation 560	Leakey, Texas	Arriving from Houston Hobby (IATA: HOU, ICAO: KHOU, FAA LID: HOU), the aircraft landed more than halfway down the runway at Real County Airport (FAA LID: 49R). The aircraft overran the departure end of the runway and collided with trees. A post-impact fire consumed the aircraft after the crew and four passengers were able to evacuate.	—	—	—	6
28 August 2006	N879QS	Hawker 800XP	Smith, Nevada	Arriving from McClellan–Palomar Airport (IATA: CLD, ICAO: KCRQ, FAA LID: CRQ), N879QS collided midair with a glider (N7729) 10 miles (16 km) west-northwest of Smith, Nevada, at an altitude of 16,000 feet (4,900 m) above sea level, on approach to Reno–Tahoe International Airport (IATA: RNO, ICAO: KRNO, FAA LID: RNO). The jet landed safely with only minor injuries on board; the pilot of the glider parachuted to safety, but sustained minor injuries while landing. During the investigation, the pilot of the glider stated that glider's transponder was off in order to preserve the batteries for radio use.	—	—	2 + 1	3
16 June 2026	N523QS	Cessna 680 Citation Latitude	Laredo, Texas	The aircraft was operating a flight from Los Cabos International Airport to Austin-Bergstrom International Airport when it crashed near Texas State Highway Loop 20. One person was killed.	1	—	10 (5 on the ground)	—

== See also ==
- AirSprint
- Air taxi
- Flexjet
- Fractional ownership of aircraft
- List of charter airlines
- PlaneSense
- VistaJet
- Wheels Up
