= Airstream Jets =

American jet charter company

Airstream Jets, Inc.
- Type: Privately held company
- Industry: Transportation, Aviation
- Founded: 2008
- Founder: Peter Maestrales
- Headquarters: Boca Raton Airport, Boca Raton, Florida, United States
- Number of locations: Boca Raton, Florida & Teterboro, New Jersey
- Area served: Worldwide
- Products: Jet Card
- Services: Private Jet Charter, On-Demand Air Charter
- Website: airstreamjets.com

Airstream Jets, Inc. is a privately owned aircraft charter company established in 2008 and based in Boca Raton, Florida. The company is a member of the National Business Aviation Association (NBAA).

The company is known for its Distance Card jet card program and its on-demand private jet charter services. Unlike most operators that charge by flight hours, the Distance Card calculates costs according to miles traveled. Pricing for Distance Card users is based on an algorithm that takes in a variety of factors and also provides pricing for 250 international destinations.

== History ==
Airstream Jets was founded in 2008 by Peter Maestrales. In 2019 Airstream Jets expanded to the Northeast U.S. with the opening of an office at Signature Flight Support's south terminal at Teterboro Airport in New Jersey.

== Services ==
Airstream Jets specializes in providing aircraft and crews for on-demand private air charter, pro & collegiate sports team travel, VIP airliner charter for international delegations and air medical services. They also conduct private jet management, corporate aircraft purchases and provide business aviation market intelligence.
