= Jet card =

Product allowing people to use private jets on an hour-by-hour basis

- Type: Private aviation
- Inventor: Sentient Jet
- Inception: 1997

A jet card is a private aviation product that enables holders to use different aircraft at agreed-upon fixed hourly rates. Jet cards are offered by large and small fleet operators and charter brokers. There are as many as 65 variables between jet card companies, according to Private Jet Card Comparisons, a buyer's guide to jet card programs.

Traditional jet card programs are prepaid hours of occupied flight time on a given aircraft or size of aircraft. Some programs include not only jets, but turboprops. The term "jet card" can also refer to prepaid private jet charter programs that have similar attributes.

Notable jet card providers include Air Partner, Airstream Jets, Flexjet, Marquis Jet (NetJets), and Wheels Up.

== Jet card history ==
The first jet card was created in 1997 by Paul A Svensen, the founder of Sentient Jet, a charter broker located in Quincy, Massachusetts. The jet card was developed in response to the highly popular fractional ownership programs of the time offered by NetJets and Flight Options. The attraction to fractional ownership and ultimately the jet card was the consistency in pricing over charter and the reduced complexity of owning a jet, which were the only other options prior to NetJets.

The term "jet card" was devised to create a marketing product for what equates to block on-demand charter. Jet cards were created as a way to offer flight time to private aviation users flying up to 50 hours per year. Rather than purchasing a whole aircraft or investing in fractional ownership, a jet card can be a cost-effective option for frequent leisure travellers or users of business aviation.

== Jet card awards ==
- Robb Report Best of the Best Aviation 2020: XO
- Robb Report Best of the Best Aviation 2021: Magellan Explorer
- Robb Report Best of the Best Aviation 2022: FlyExclusive's Jet Club
- Robb Report Best of the Best Aviation 2023: Volato Stretch Card

== Jet card types ==
Jet cards have evolved from the original card in 1997 which simply made charter pricing more consistent by guaranteeing fixed hourly rates to membership programs which offer free or discounted empty leg/re-positioning leg flights and individual seats on private jet shuttles.

Here are some examples of the varying types of jet cards offered today:

- The standard charter-based jet card—the most common type of jet card offered by charter brokers and operators. Customers pre-purchase hours or place money on account which is deducted at fixed hourly rates. Flights are sourced through the existing charter market.
- Mileage-based pricing jet card—pricing based on distance as opposed to time. Mileage-based pricing is transparent and quantifiable.
- Dynamic priced jet cards—customers place a deposit on account and receive options based on market availability. Customers may select specific aircraft and are not committed to a fleet or required to use their deposit within any specific time frame.
- Capped rate—a development from always paying a fixed hourly rate, customers are still protected with a maximum hourly rate but retain the ability to get lower rates dependent on market availability and notice given.
- The fractional ownership jet card—fractional jet cards, such as those offered by NetJets or FlexJet, offer prepaid hours of occupied flight time, sold in the form of a sublease of a fractional jet share. Operators such as FlexJet give fractional jet owners the ability to sell unused flight hours in the form of fractional jet cards, with prepaid hours ranging from five to 50 hours.
- Owned fleet jet cards—jets are configured similarly to increase quality and consistency. The fleet is backed up using the existing charter fleet during peak travel periods.
- Jets by the seat—offers individual seats on private jets for certain routes after paying an annual membership. The seats can come from empty leg/re-positioning legs and/or shuttle flights which are scheduled private jet shuttles. Additional fees often apply for these seats. Some jet card sellers offer additional options to sell or purchase open seats on prepaid flights. This type of flight-sharing can be more cost-effective when not all seats are occupied on a private jet.
- Custom jet cards—launched in 2018 by several providers, custom jet cards create programs tailored to individual customers, including standards for sourcing aircraft, lead-time for making reservations, service area and hourly or fixed segment pricing.

== See also ==
- Private jet
- Fractional ownership of aircraft
- Air charter
- Air taxi
- Business jet
