= Pilatus PC-24 =

Twin-engine business jet by Pilatus Aircraft

PC-24
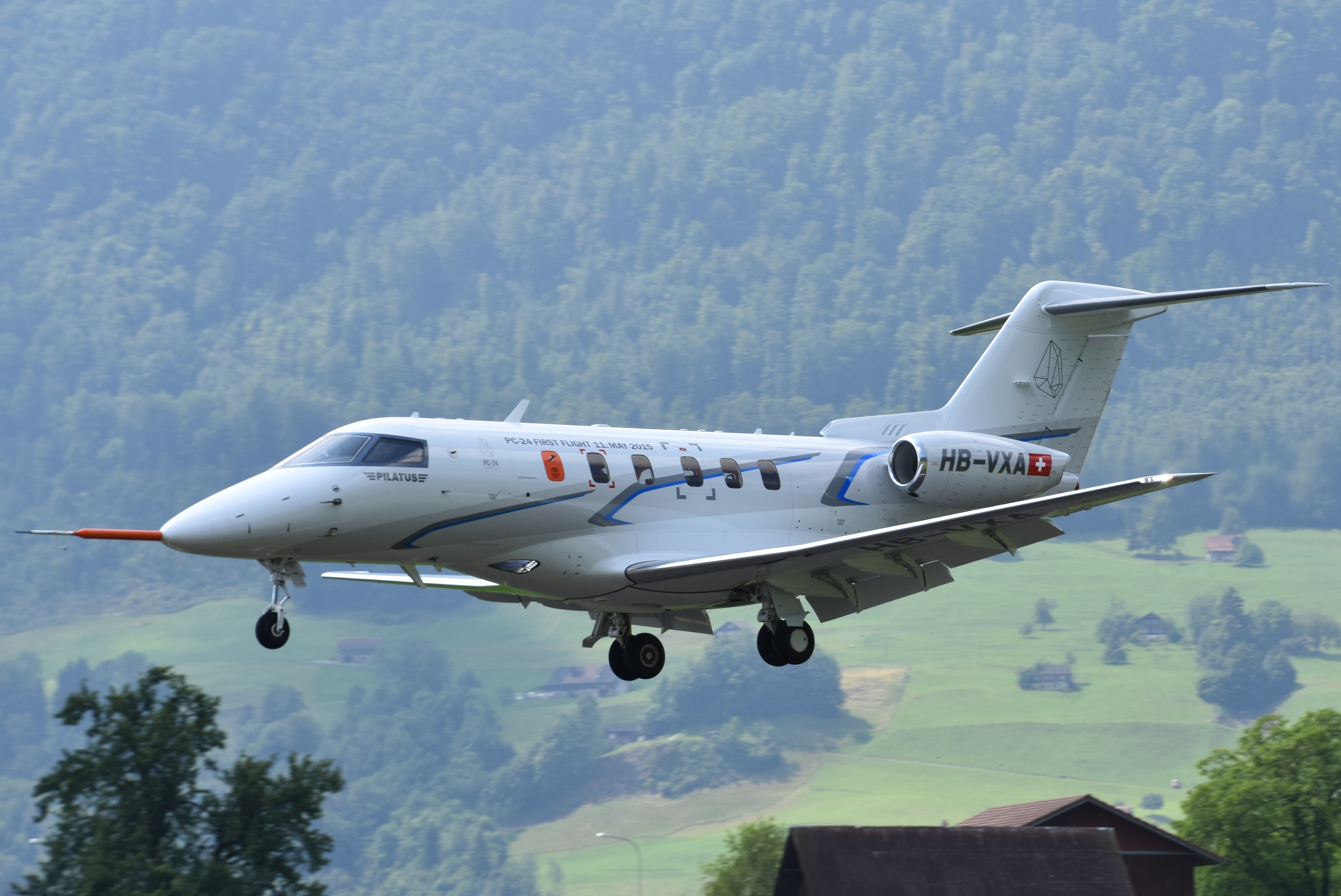
- Pilatus PC-24 first prototype landing at Stans, 2015

General information
- Type: Light business jet
- National origin: Switzerland
- Manufacturer: Pilatus Aircraft
- Status: In production
- Primary users: Qatar Emiri Air Force PlaneSense; Royal Flying Doctor Service
- Number built: 212 (Q1 2024)

History
- Manufactured: 2015–present
- Introduction date: 1 April 2018
- First flight: 11 May 2015

The Pilatus PC-24 is a light business jet produced by Pilatus Aircraft of Switzerland. Following the success of the PC-12 single engine turboprop, work on the twin engine jet began in 2007 for greater range and speed, keeping the rough-field capability. The aircraft was introduced on 21 May 2013 and rolled out on 1 August 2014, with the maiden flight on 11 May 2015. The PC-24 received EASA and FAA type certification on 7 December 2017 and the first customer delivery was on 7 February 2018. Powered by two Williams FJ44 turbofans, it competes with the Embraer Phenom 300 and the Cessna Citation CJ4.

== Development ==
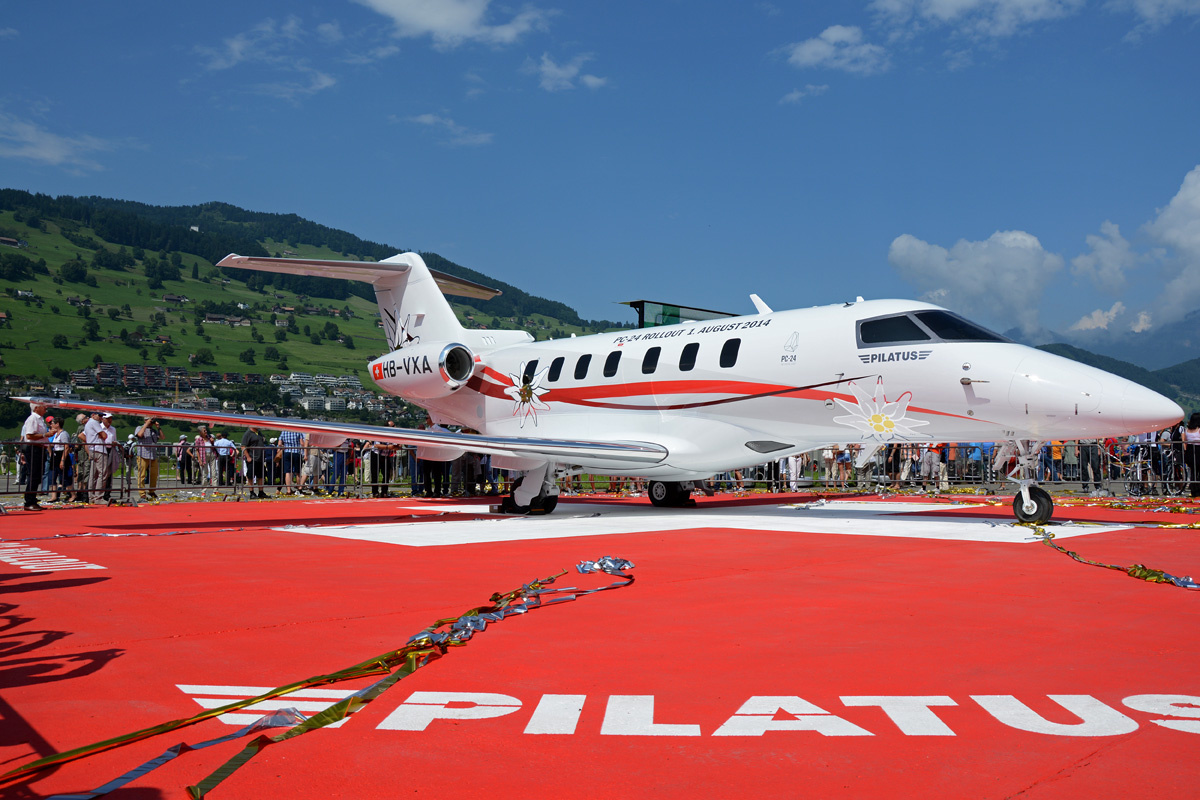
PC-24 prototype during its roll-out ceremony on 1 August 2014

During the 1990s, Pilatus Aircraft had brought to market the Pilatus PC-12, a single-engine turboprop-powered business aircraft. As the PC-12 quickly proved to be a commercial success, Pilatus sought to follow up with a complementary aircraft and began gathering feedback from customers of the type. In response to this request, several customers reportedly expressed a desire for an aircraft that would possess both a greater range and top speed than the existing PC-12, while retaining the type's overall ruggedness and ability to make use of very short runways. Based on this feedback, Pilatus elected to pursue development of such an aircraft. In 2007, Pilatus initiated work on the program. Development of the aircraft was conducted using existing company funds. The design program was first mentioned by Pilatus in its May 2011 annual report.

On 21 May 2013, the PC-24 was introduced to the public at the European Business Aviation Convention & Exhibition (EBACE) in Geneva. At the time, Pilatus chairman Oscar Schwenk claimed the PC-24 did not fit into any existing business jet categories, and stated that the aircraft was the only one that combined "...the versatility of a turboprop with the cabin size of a medium light jet, and the performance of a light jet".

On 1 August 2014, which is also Switzerland's national day, P01, the first of the three PC-24 prototypes, was rolled out. Each of these three prototypes serve different functions in the development program; P01 is intended for exploring the flight envelope of the type, P02 is mainly for trialling the avionics and autopilot integration, and will spend much of its testing life in the US, while P03 is to be representative of production aircraft and will incorporate improvements made based upon the development work performed with the other two aircraft.

=== Flight testing ===
The first flight of the prototype had been originally anticipated to take place in late 2014, but this was delayed. On 11 May 2015, P01 conducted its first flight from Buochs Airport, Switzerland, for a total of 55 minutes. The occasion marked the start of test flights for the aircraft's two-year certification campaign. At the time, type certification and initial deliveries were anticipated for 2017.

On 16 November 2015, P02, the second prototype, performed its maiden flight, lasting for 82 minutes; by this date, P01 had accumulated a total of 150 flying hours and had performed over 100 flights. In May 2016, P01 took a brief intermission in the test program to appear on static display at EBACE; by this point, P01 and P02 had accumulated more than 500 flight hours between them. During EBACE 2016, it was commented that the program was on track and test flights had been free of surprises; during a transatlantic crossing to the US, P02 had achieved a cruise speed in excess of 800 km/h (430 kn), which was better than expected.

The PC-24 flight-test fleet was completed with the addition of the third prototype of P03 in March 2017; by May they had logged 950 flights and 1,525 hours. In August 2017, Williams International received type and production certification from the EASA and FAA for its FJ44-4A-QPM while the three test aircraft accumulated over 1,700h of flight tests, on schedule for certification and introduction in the fourth quarter. By October 2017, more than 2,000 hours had been flown, with the P01 prototype flying 626 times and 900 hours. The P03 prototype will complete a functional and reliability program, including 150 hours over six weeks before certification is completed and initial deliveries commence.

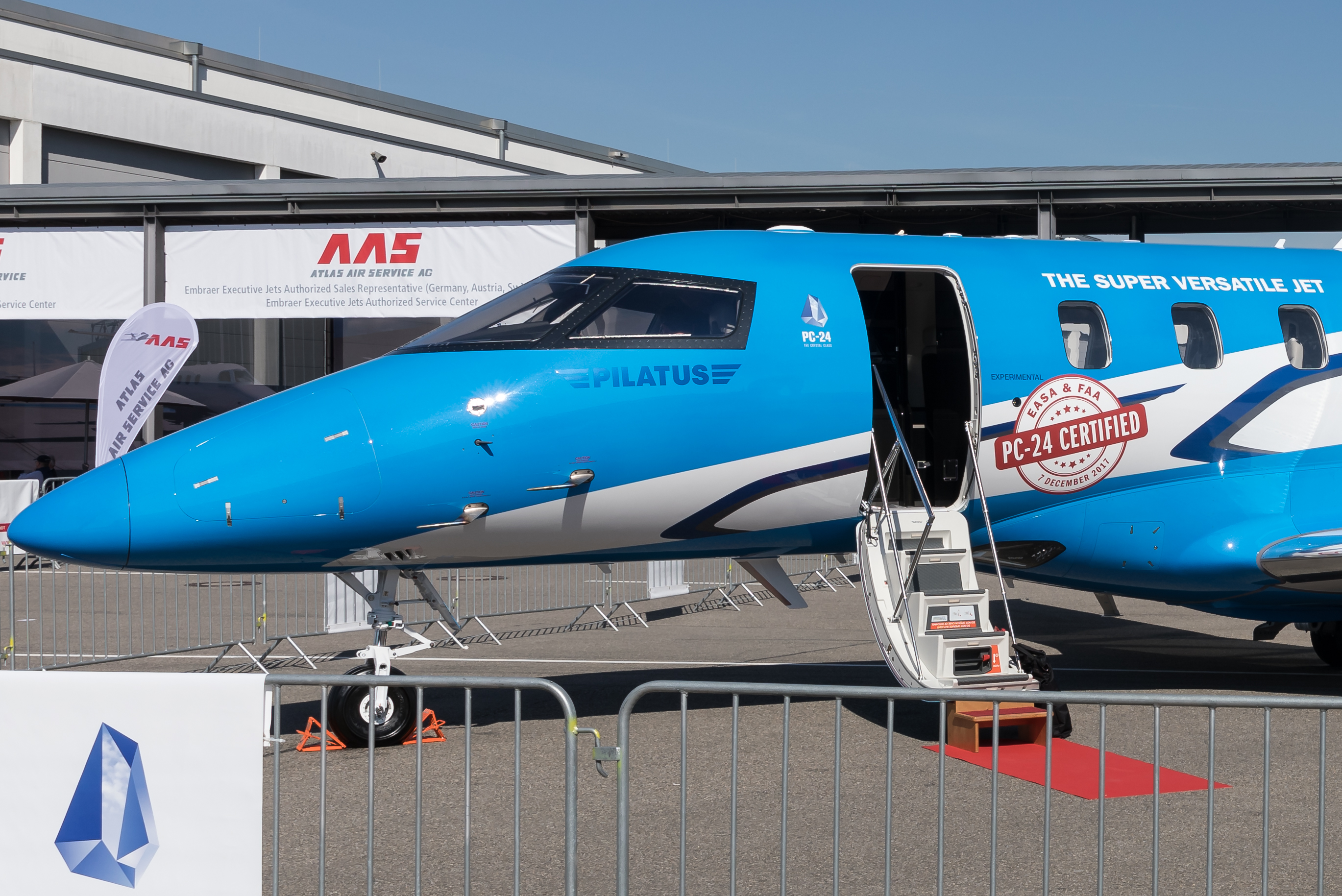
Type certification was granted on 7 December 2017, as placarded at the April 2018 AERO Friedrichshafen.

The three prototypes flew 2205 hours including icing conditions and very hot temperatures, outside its flight envelope, bird strikes, structural stress tests and noise tests before it received EASA and FAA type certification on 7 December 2017. Its performance goals were met or exceeded, like its maximum speed raised from 425 to 440 knots (787 to 815 km/h).

In the fourth quarter of 2018, the aircraft was certified by EU and US air authorities to land on and take off from dry sand or gravel runways. Australian Royal Flying Doctor Service was scheduled to start medevac in 2019. Transport Canada certification was awarded on 27 June 2019. In February 2020, the design was approved for rough field operation, certifying the aircraft to operate to and from grass, wet earth and snow-covered surfaces, following a multiyear certification campaign.

=== Production ===
In late 2014, an agreement between Pilatus and FlightSafety International will see the latter conduct US-based PC-24 pilot and technician training in Dallas, Texas. In May 2017, series production was under way for a fourth quarter first delivery to PlaneSense, following certification.

In December 2017, eight PC-24s were on the assembly line and 23 deliveries were planned for 2018. The first customer delivery was completed on 7 February 2018 to PlaneSense.

In 2018, 23 to 24 were planned for delivery, with 40 planned for 2019 and then 50 per year.

On 11 October 2018, its MTOW was raised from 8,005 to 8,300 kg (17,650 to 18,300 lb), from the 31st serial aircraft produced, while its zero-fuel weight (empty weight plus payload) grew by 350 kg (770 lb).

=== Orders and deliveries ===
At the May 2014 EBACE, Pilatus sold the initial production run of 84 units 36 hours after orders opened. This first batch of orders is to be delivered until early 2020. Orders were to reopen after publishing the aircraft's final performance data and assessing operators' feedback. Throughout its 40-year lifecycle, Pilatus plan to produce 4,000 units. A PC-24 was ordered to transport the Swiss Federal Council. When it was certified in December 2017, it was priced at US$8.9M.

On 26 November 2018, the first of five was delivered to the Royal Flying Doctor Service, supplementing its 35 PC-12s single turboprops. Unpaved and short 856 m (2,808 ft) runways should be allowed next, and it should enter service in early 2019 as an air ambulance with three beds and an electric stretcher loader. They feature individual oxygen, vacuum and power systems for patient monitoring and support installed under a supplemental type certificate by aircraft medical interiors specialist Aerolite AG, for $13 million complete each. It will replace a midsize Hawker 800XP operated in Western Australia since 2009, a gravel kit will be available by the end of the year, and Pilatus is working on operating on narrow runways, from 23 to 18 m (75 to 59 ft).

By May 2019, Pilatus had sold 30 units and reopened the PC-24 orderbook at the EBACE show, with about 80 delivery positions made available at a price of $10.7 million each, for late 2020 and 2021 deliveries. Of these new positions half were sold within days. The PC-24 had been granted European and US steep approach certification, including for London City airport's 5.5° approach and short runway, plus dirt and gravel runway operations. Rough-field certification was approved for grass, wet earth and snow operations in late January 2020.

The 50th was delivered by October 2019, and the 100th by January 2021.

In 2023, its equipped price was $12.2M.

== Design ==
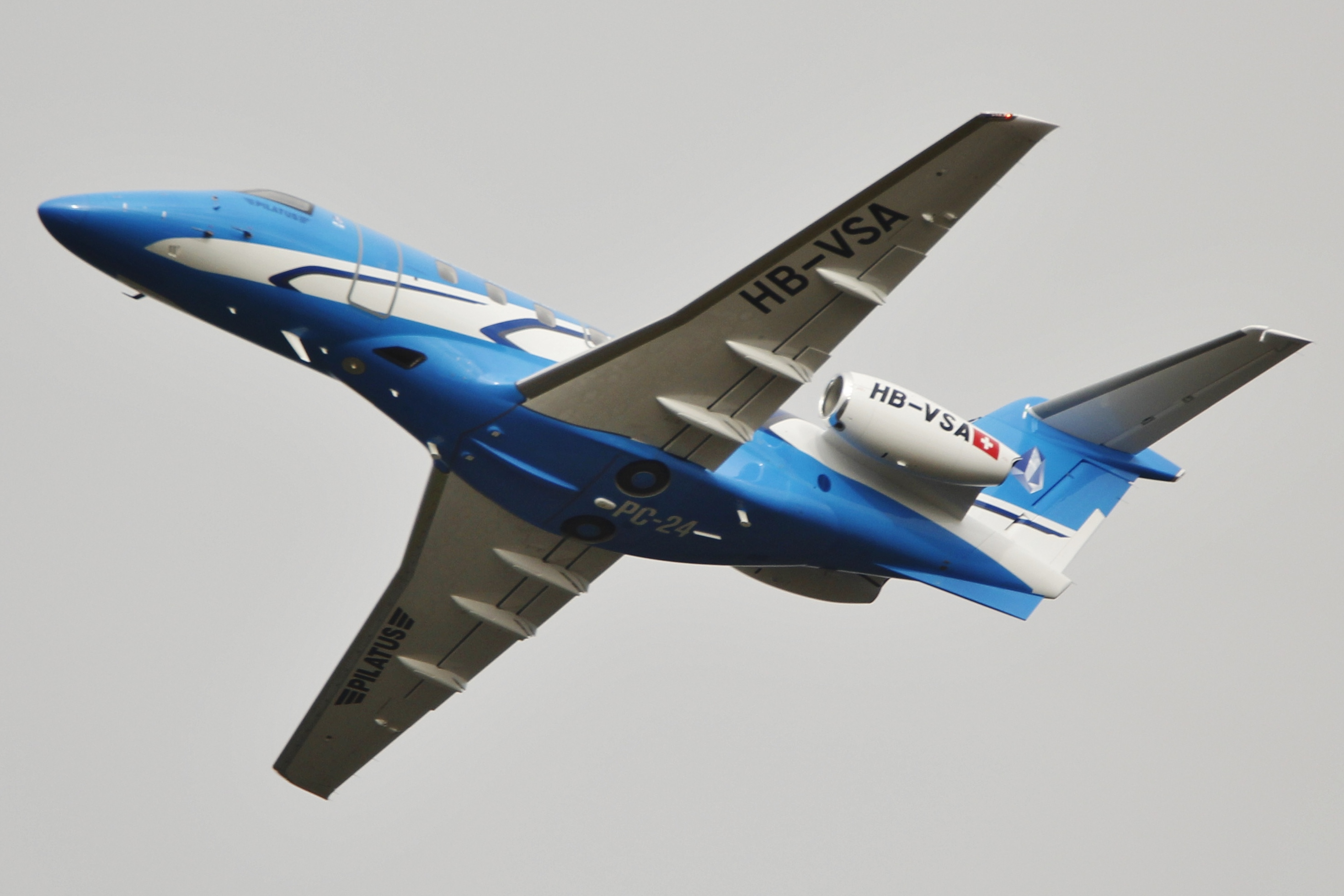
Viewed from below, showing moderate wing sweep with a straight trailing edge and exposed wheels

=== Market ===
The PC-24 is the company's first jet-powered aircraft. Several competing business aircraft were identified early on, including Embraer's Phenom 300 and Cessna's Citation CJ4.

=== Airframe ===
It is a low-wing cantilever cabin monoplane powered by two Williams FJ44-4A turbofans, each mounted in a nacelle on the side of the rear fuselage. It has a T-tail and a retractable tricycle landing gear. The aircraft is designed to operate from short and rough airstrips and incorporates an advanced wing design, with a large double-slotted flap system to achieve the necessary performance, having a stall speed of only 81 knots at the maximum landing weight. The long-stroke trailing link landing gear smooths out uneven surfaces, the dual-wheel main wheels have 70 psi (4.8 bar) of pressure to prevent sinking in soft surfaces, and the wing flaps have a replaceable, abradable surface and shields the high mounted engines from loose debris.

=== Cabin ===
The cabin has room for ten passengers in the cabin and one or two pilots. The cabin has three exits, a passenger door on the left-hand side near the front, overwing emergency exits on each side of the aircraft, and a cargo door on the left-hand side at the rear. Pilatus claims the PC-24 is the first business jet to be fitted with this standard pallet-sized cargo door.

The interior colour schemes of the PC-24 have been designed by BMW Designworks; interiors for the Americas are to be completed at a facility in Broomfield, Colorado, which will be expanded by 50% to cope with the extra demand.

=== Cockpit ===
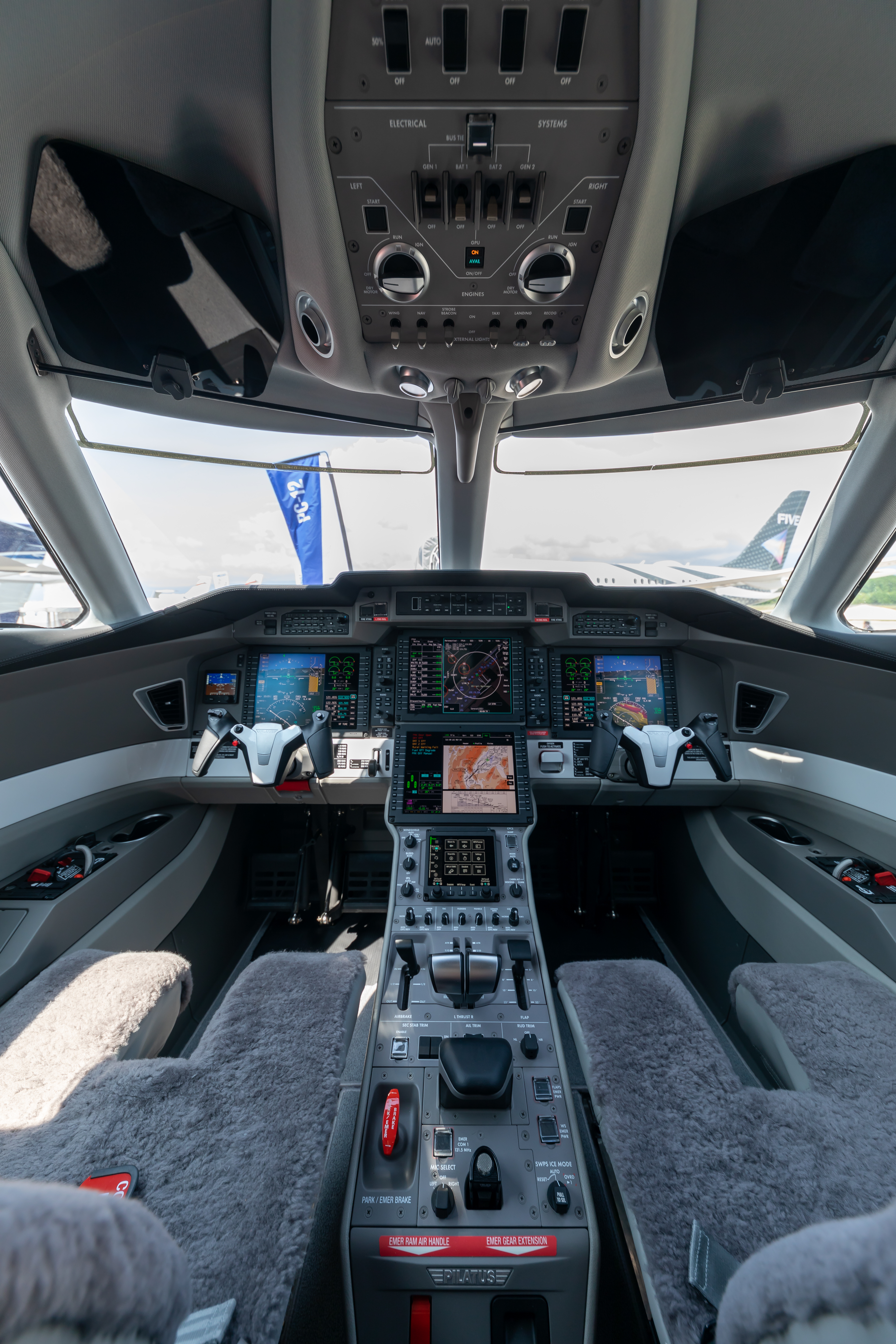
Cockpit

Pilatus and Honeywell cooperatively designed the Advanced Cockpit Environment for the type. This is intended to reduce pilot workload and allows the PC-24 to be single-pilot certified. The avionics system is based on Honeywell Primus Epic 2.

=== Performance ===
At 45,000 ft (14,000 m) and 7,260 kg (16,010 lb), total fuel flow is 850 lb (390 kg) per hour at M0.65 long range cruise or 372 kn (689 km/h), rising to 970 lb (440 kg)/h at its M0.74 high-speed cruise.

In July 2021, the design was updated with a number of refinements for new-build aircraft that can also be retro-fitted to earlier production aircraft. These updates included newly designed, lighter and more comfortable, quick release cabin seats; an optional galley to replace the forward coat closet; touchscreen-controlled avionics; tactile feedback in pitch and roll, plus limit protection; pilot-defined visual approaches and automated audible callouts. Also approved were True Blue Power lithium ion battery sets which are 84 lb (38 kg) lighter and less expensive to maintain.

== Civil operators ==
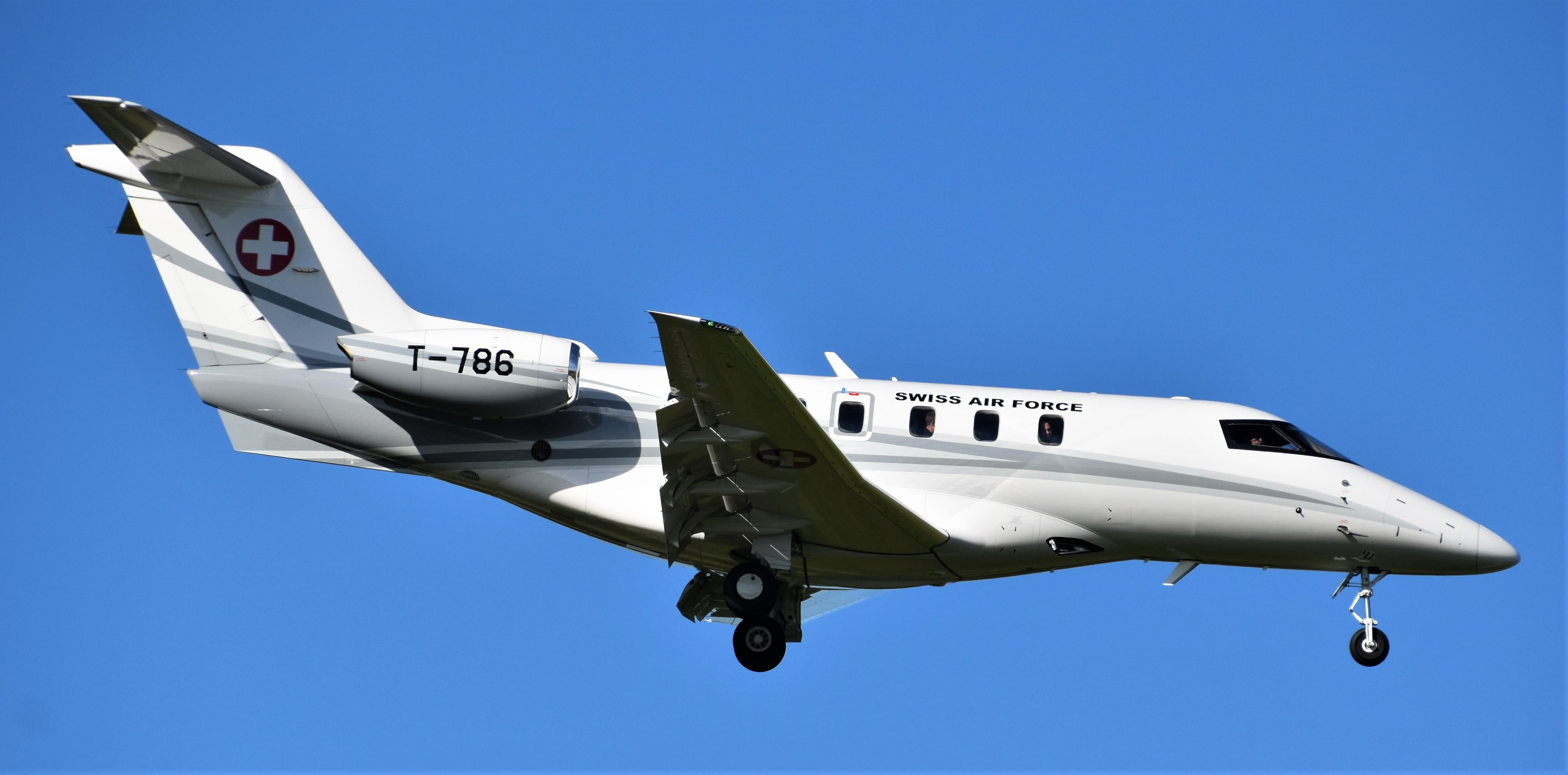
Swiss Air Force PC-24

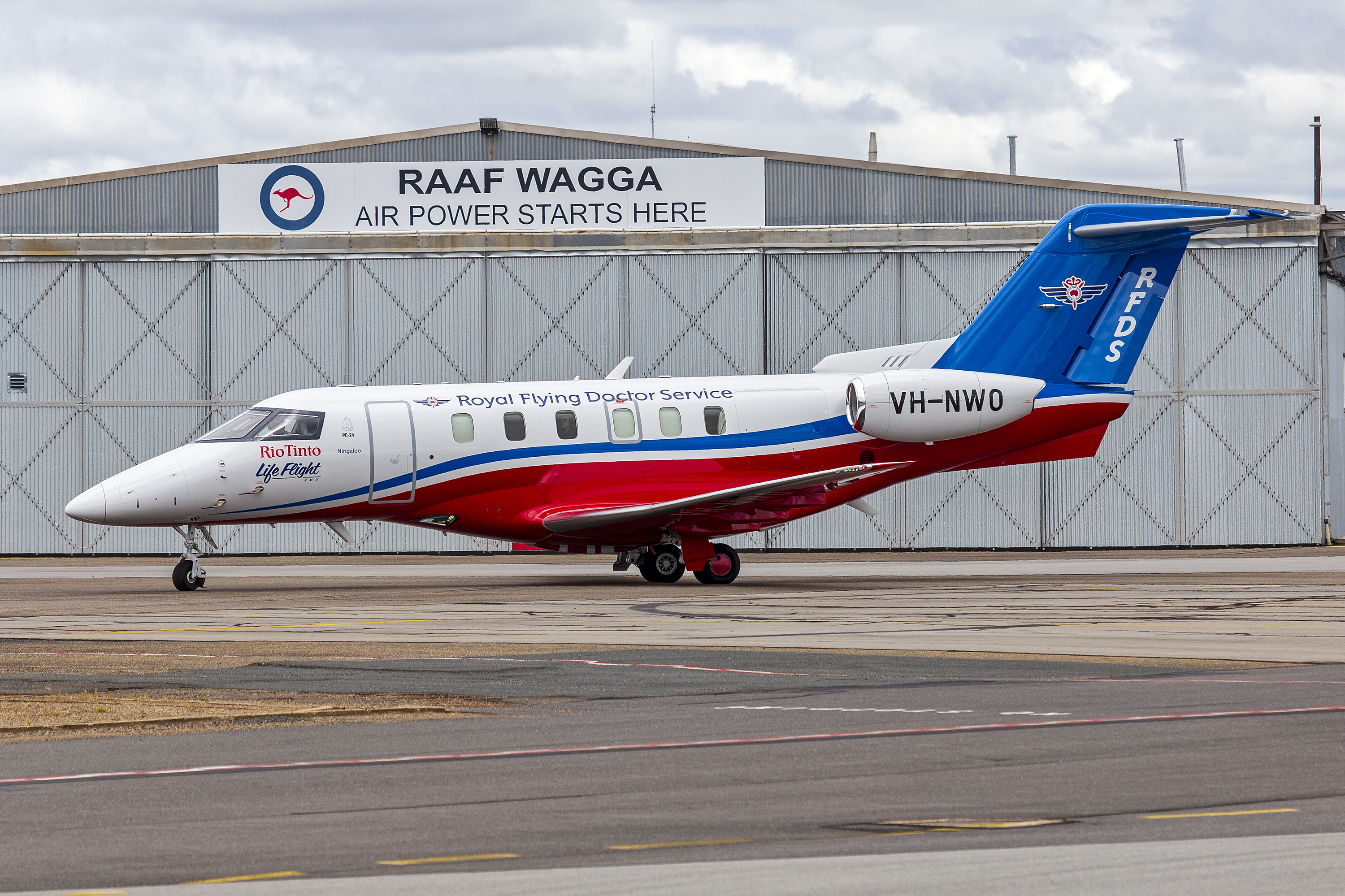
Royal Flying Doctor Service PC-24

The aircraft is popular with air charter companies and is also operated by private companies.

By January 2021, the fleet of 100 jets has logged 33,500 flight hours, including 2,375 hours by the fleet leader.

=== Organisations ===
Australia
- Royal Flying Doctor Service: 5 aircraft
- NSW Ambulance: 2 aircraft
Sweden (6 operational + 4 in option)
Svenskt Ambulansflyg operates : 6 aircraft, and 4 are in option.

=== Private operators ===
Belgium

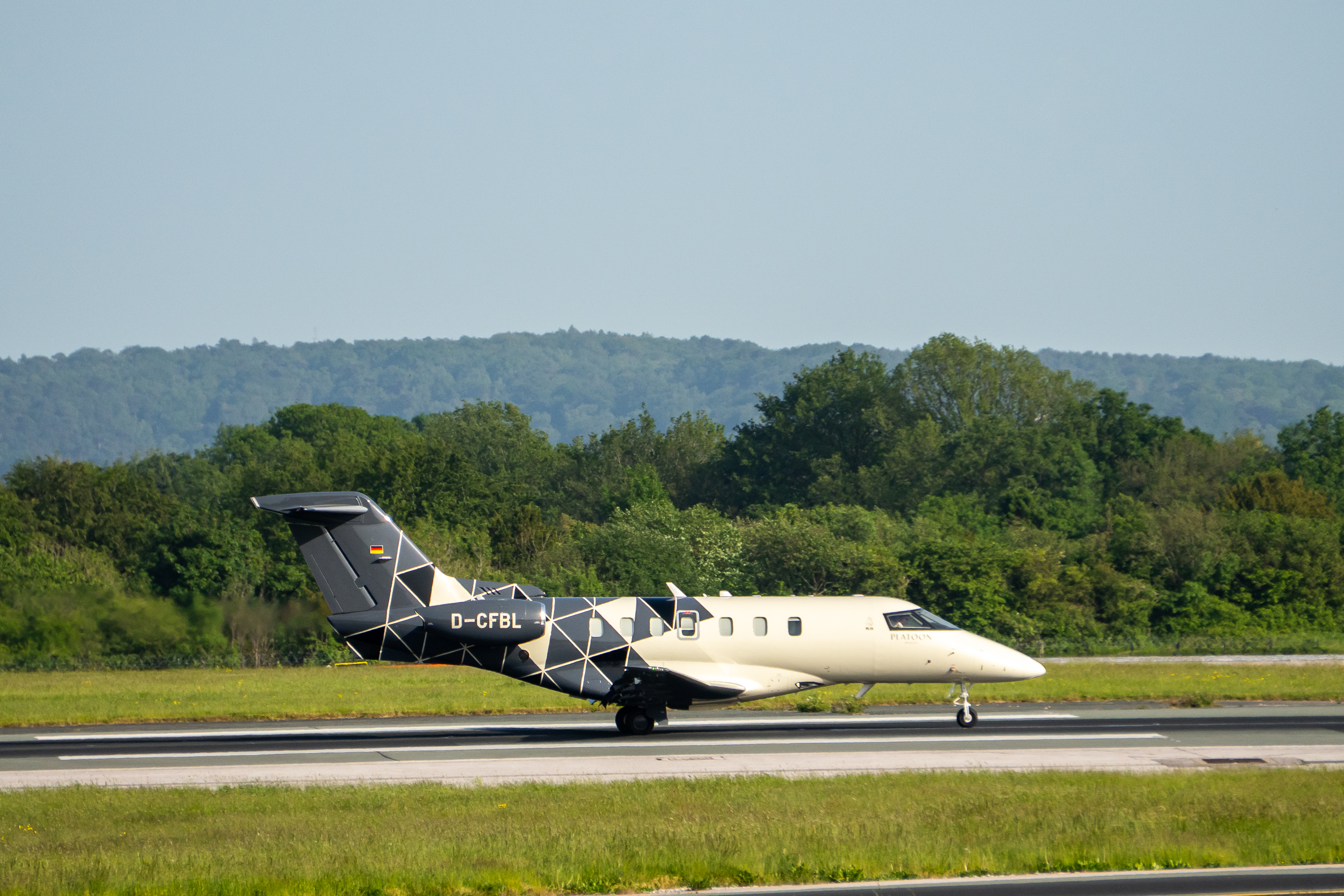
A Platoon Aviation PC-24 at Manchester Airport

FlyingGroup: 9 aircraft
Canada
8 aircraft
Aviation Starlink: 2 aircraft
Canadian Utilities: 1 aircraft
Image Air Charter: 1 aircraft
Keewatin Air: 2 aircraft, both in MEDEVAC (air ambulance) roles in Nunavut
Levaero Aviation: 1 aircraft
Woodward's Oil: 1 aircraft
Chile
Aerocardal: 1 aircraft
France
ADAO Transports: 1 aircraft
Germany
Platoon Aviation: 11 aircraft, 10 in service
India
Adani Enterprises: 4 in service, 2 on order
Switzerland
JoyVida International: 1 aircraft. The group purchased the former Swiss Air Force aircraft.
United States
AirSmart: 1 aircraft

== Government and military operators ==
=== Current operators ===
==== Military operators ====
France (2 in service, + 1 on order)
French armed forces:
- French Naval Aviation: Successor of the Dassault Falcon 10M as part of the Balbuzard programme. They will be used for IFR training and IFR qualification for the Rafale M pilots and as liaison aircraft for the general staff of the French Navy. The aircraft will be leased from an American-Swiss company, Jet Aviation. The first delivery took place in March 2026, the second in August 2026.
Indonesia (12 on order)
The Indonesian Air Force ordered 12 aircraft alongside 24 PC-21 for the training of pilots in 2026.
Qatar (2)
The Qatar Emiri Air Force operates 2 aircraft.
Spain (7 on order)
Spanish Armed Forces:
- Spanish Air and Space Force (4): The PC-24 was selected in April 2026 to replace the Cessna 560, the Cessna Citation V and the Beechcraft King Air C90. Delivery in 2026 and 2027,
- Spanish Naval Aviation (3): The PC-24 was selected in April 2026 to replace the Cessna 550 Citation II and the Cessna Citation VI. Delivery in 2026 and 2027.

==== Government operators ====
Canada (1 on order)
The Royal Canadian Mounted Police has ordered 1 PC-24 for the Air Services branch. It will be airframe S/N 611.
Ontario (2 on order)
Ontario Provincial Police acquired a PC-24 to be used by the force and VIP use by the province. Ontario's air ambulance organization Ornge is acquiring 2 PC-24's to augment its current fleet of Pilatus PC-12 fixed-wing planes and AgustaWestland AW139 helicopters.
Spain (1 on order)
The interior ministry ordered 1 PC-24 in August 2024 for the Air unit of the national police.
United States
North Slope Borough Search and Rescue Department: 1 aircraft
Nevada Department of Transportation: 1 aircraft

=== Potential operators ===
==== Military operators ====
Finland
The Finnish Air Force:is looking for a successor of the Learjet 35 as a liaison and transport aircraft as part of the JETX programme. The PC-24 is considered as the favourite of the bidding competition.
France
The French Air and Space Force is looking for a successor to the Embraer EMB 121 Xingu, used as a multi-engine trainer. The PC-24 is a potential successor.

=== Former operators ===
Switzerland (1)
The Swiss Air Force used to operate 1 aircraft, but it was later sold.

== Specifications ==
Data from Pilatus

General characteristics

- Crew: one or two
- Capacity: 10 passengers
- Length: 16.85 m (55 ft 3 in)
- Wingspan: 17.0 m (55 ft 9 in)
- Height: 5.4 m (17 ft 4 in)
- Wing area: 30.91 m^{2} (332.6 sq ft)
- Aspect ratio: 9.35
- Empty weight: 5,244 kg (11,561 lb)
- Max takeoff weight: 8,500 kg (18,739 lb) Max ramp weight: 8,545 kg (18,839 lb)
- Fuel capacity: 2,705 kg (5,964 lb), 888.5 US gal (3,363 L)
- Max payload: 1,406 kg (3,100 lb)
- Cabin: 7.01 m × 1.69 m × 1.55 m long × wide × high ( 23 ft 0 in × 5 ft 7 in × 5 ft 1 in)
- Cabin altitude: 2,438 m at 13,716 m (8,000 ft at 45,000 ft), 8.78 psi (0.605 bar)
- Powerplant: 2 × Williams FJ44-4A turbofans, 15 kN (3,400 lbf) thrust each

Performance

- Cruise speed: 810 km/h (510 mph, 440 kn)
- Stall speed: 154 km/h (96 mph, 83 kn)
- Range: 3,700 km (2,300 mi, 2,000 nmi) , 6 passengers (1,200 lb payload) (Note: NBAA IFR reserves of 100 nm + 30 min hold at 5,000 ft, long-range cruise, Single Pilot Ops)
- Ferry range: 3,932 km (2,443 mi, 2,123 nmi)
- Service ceiling: 14,000 m (45,000 ft)
- Rate of climb: 20.1 m/s (3,960 ft/min) MTOW, at Sea level
- Time to altitude: 45,000 ft (14,000 m) 27.1 mins
- Wing loading: 259 kg/m^{2} (53 lb/sq ft)
- Fuel consumption: 0.58 kg/km (2.1 lb/mi) Mach 0.72/416 kn (770 km/h) cruise, 15,375 lb (6,974 kg) weight, FL 450, ISA+3C
- Thrust/weight: 0.36
- Take-off: 942 m; 3,091 ft (MTOW, ISA, sea level, dry paved runway)
- Landing: 734 m; 2,408 ft (Over 50 ft obstacle, MLW, ISA, sea level, dry paved runway)

== See also ==
Aircraft of comparable role, configuration, and era

- Cessna CitationJet CJ4
- Embraer Phenom 300
- Grob G180 SPn
- HondaJet Echelon
- SyberJet SJ30
