= Fractional ownership of aircraft =

Method of owning aircraft

Fractional ownership of aircraft is an arrangement in which multiple owners share the use and costs of purchasing and operating an aircraft. Several management companies provide fractional ownership programs for aircraft, including NetJets, Flexjet, Cirrus Aviation Services, and AirSprint. Alternatively, owners can join together to purchase their aircraft, independently of any management company.

Fractional aircraft ownership allows individuals to purchase a share of an aircraft, instead of the entire aircraft itself. The price for this share is pro-rated based on the market price of a full aircraft. As a result of this purchase, owners have guaranteed, limited access to the plane or a similar one in the operator's fleet, proportional to the size of their share. Monthly maintenance fees and occupied hourly operating fees are required of fractional owners. Typically, the latter is charged only when an owner or guest is on board, not during the plane's travel to a pickup point or its return to its home base after a flight.

For shared aircraft that are part of a large management company fleet, owners have access to the full fleet of planes and may upgrade or downgrade for specific flights. Ownership contracts are typically for five years. At the end of the contract, the owner can sell their share either back to the company or to another owner waiting for a position. Most fleet management companies charge a "re-marketing fee" for the final sale.

In some cases, several individuals purchase and operate their chosen aircraft as an independent group without going through a commercial operator. If one individual then decides to sell their share, it may be purchased by the remaining owners or sold outside the group to another individual. The details will vary from group to group as it is subject to whatever terms were in the original contract.

== In depth ==
In the commercial system, customers purchase or lease a fraction of an aircraft, alongside numerous other anonymous individuals. Depending on the company, the aircraft may be split into 16ths or even 32nds of a fractional share. These fractions translate to several hours per year, with a full 100 percent share typically equating to 800 annual hours of usage. Most shares are sold at the 1/16 (50 hours) or 1/8 (100 hours) level.

Although the aircraft is shared, owners are guaranteed access with 4–48 hours notice, depending on the provider and plan. Providers can offer this service on such short notice, by having a fleet of similar aircraft, which are interchanged amongst the owners.

In addition, to purchase costs, owners pay a monthly management fee to cover the cost of maintenance, upgrades, hangar space, pilot salaries, and training. When using the aircraft, owners also pay for the flight hours and a nominal amount for taxiing. The final cost component is fuel, which has a surcharge above the hourly fee to compensate for price volatility.

An owner's share allotment is depleted for actual hours of occupied flight, plus taxiing, with a 1– to 2–hour minimum. Owners are not charged for any non-occupied flight time that may be required to get the aircraft to them and return to its home base. This is called variously "deadhead", "positioning", "ferry", or "empty leg" depending on the company.

In addition to the "owned" plane, customers gain access to other planes in the fleet. When desired, they may switch to larger or smaller planes on a set "interchange" formula. Access to a smaller aircraft may be guaranteed, but larger aircraft access may be conditional on the shares owned.

The size of a share may provide additional benefits including:

- "Short leg" waivers – minimum flight times, often of 1 hour may be waived instead of actual flight time.
- Availability guarantees – the greater the share size, the greater the guarantee, particularly with larger aircraft or shorter call-out periods.
- Overfly rules – some companies allow owners to access hours from future years if they have already flown their annual allowance.
- Ferry waivers – When flying outside of a provider's "primary service area", owners lose guarantees and often have to cover the "deadhead" costs. Secondary service areas, such as the Caribbean, may be defined where these expenses may be reduced.
- Peak/Busy period access – Popular holidays and heavy travel dates are considered peak or busy periods when demand is the highest, which can exceed the company's available aircraft. Accordingly, service levels are reduced by lengthening call-out periods, disapplying guarantees, and applying restrictions, all of which are more stringently applied to owners with smaller shares.

In the United States, fractional owners and operators are subject to Federal Aviation Regulations, FAR Part 91, Subpart K.

== Agreement ==
Private air travel advisors can be of assistance with navigating and negotiating the so-called "boilerplate" fractional contract.

Owners rarely fly the specific aircraft in which they hold shared titles. More likely, they will travel on identical planes in the company's fleet. This is a natural consequence of the fractional model since many owners "pull" on the same plane. Often the plane is either in use by another owner, or another plane is positioned in a more convenient location for deployment.

This fleet flexibility is one of the key benefits of fractional ownership over full ownership. Owners are not stranded when their plane is undergoing maintenance, and they can upgrade or downgrade to other fleet aircraft for special trip requirements.

Fractional agreement terms are typically five years, after which owners sell their share back to the company for the then-current fair market value, less a "remarketing fee", typically around 7%. The fee may be waived for renewals. Customers may also lease their share in a variety of configurations, depending on their tax and financial profile. The "fair market value" calculation is a key consideration and can dominate the overall cost-benefit analysis of the fractional ownership format. Many fractional owners were burned by the volatile market and geopolitical conditions of the early 2000s and the recession in the late 2000s. All contracts should outline an appeals process if the owner disputes the end-of-contract valuation.

== Advantage over regular airline services ==
- Flexibility in destinations – Commercial air travel is generally reserved for the largest 500 airports in the country, with 75% of all traffic directed through the 30 major hubs. Private aviation broadens prospective airports to over 5,000 in the U.S.
- General Aviation (GA) Terminals – Even at major airports, private planes are handled separately, with a special terminal that offers greater service, comfort and amenities.
- Flexibility in scheduling and flying – Depending on the program, private aviation can be available within 4–48 hours of your phone call. This availability is a core benefit of fractional jets.
- Airport process – Most airports allow you to skip the terminal and drive right up to your plane. Your bags go directly from your car to the plane.
- Time savings and in-flight productivity – These are frequently cited by clients as the dominant benefit and come in three forms: gaining access to more convenient airports, scheduling flights according to one's timetable, and simplifying the process of getting in and out of planes and airports. Nearly all flights are nonstop, and there are none of the commercial hassles of layovers, connections, reboarding and long security lines. In-flight time on a private plane is considerably more effective for conducting meetings, conference calls, and brainstorming sessions.
- Business Entertaining – Private jets offer special intimacy and prestige and provide a unique environment for candid discussions and social bonding.
- Security – All pilots, crew, and maintenance staff are required to have photo identification that can be verified on the spot. Each employee is typically subject to numerous background checks. Overall, general aviation lacks passenger anonymity and sheer size which has made commercial aviation more of a target. A secondary security benefit stems from the owner's control of the schedule and itinerary. A customer can quickly fly into business emergencies that might require their on-the-ground attention or quickly depart from unpleasant surprises such as riots or political upheaval.
- Five-star Service – Fractional jet programs provide on-call concierges to attend to all travel requests, and some non-travel needs. Food, beverages, and media choices are all tailored for each mission.
- Ego – For many fliers, an unstated benefit is the pride of ownership in a luxury of the highest order. Even though owners rarely travel in "their" plane, the provider works carefully to make them feel that whatever plane they're travelling in is their plane. There are no company logos on the fuselage or the napkins. Guests may easily assume that the plane they're boarding is fully owned by their host.

== Advantage over Chartering / Full ownership ==
- Flying One Leg Journeys – As fractional owners only pay for the time that they are in the air, Fractional Jet Ownership could be cost-effective if the fractional owner flies many One Leg Journeys. In comparison, when people charter a jet, then they are effectively paying for the empty leg return from where the charter operates from.
- Consistency – Unlike charter programs, fractional owners travel in the same model of aircraft with each flight. Though they may upgrade or downgrade, they typically select one plane and stick with it. This provides familiarity and comfort.
- Flight plans from the edges of regions or continents – For example, in Europe, if someone is flying from Greenland, then there are likely to be fewer private jet charter operators to choose from and therefore the price benefit gained from a broker will be greatly reduced.

== Drawbacks ==
- Convenience – Being locked into a plane, or even a class of plane, can mean not having the right aircraft for each trip (e.g., too many passengers, not enough range, too much range making it expensive for short trips, unable to land in certain airfields, unable to take off at certain high altitudes—as is the case with many aircraft in places such as Telluride and Aspen).
- Cost – Private jet travel is very expensive, and the fractional model can be the costliest option (when compared to memberships, charters, etc.). The plans are also complex, with multiple layers of cost that make it nearly impossible to calculate a realistic fully loaded bottom-line per-flight cost. Owners are charged a monthly fee whether or not they fly, and the often-overlooked fuel surcharges can add up to over $1,000 per flight hour. When owners sell their share back to the provider, the "residual value" calculation can vary substantially, depending on market conditions for used aircraft. Additionally, planes in fractional fleets tend to be flown harder, with more hours and takeoff/landing cycles than the average. This negatively affects residual value. The initial purchase price for a 1/16 share of a light jet starts at over $300,000. Monthly management fees start at about $9,000 per month. Occupied hourly rates start at about $1,500.
- Flexibility – The purchased share is for a specific plane. Any variations for a specific mission can bring additional costs and calculations.

== Principle ==
The original formula for fractional flight is similar to its present incarnation: customers purchase proportional shares of aircraft that are guaranteed to be available. The provider then purchases an additional 26 per cent of capacity (over and above the fleet purchased by clients) to fulfil that guarantee. These extra planes bring the guarantee to 98 per cent statistically. The last 2% of the guarantee represents holidays and other worst-case situations. To close this gap in the guarantee, the company relies on "supplemental lift" from charter—either from affiliated companies or trusted third-party charter operators. As more client-owners join, a network effect results in a reduction of expensive empty legs: with a critical mass of customers, the theory is that it becomes more likely that a particular trip can be accommodated with minimal deadheading. In reality, it is not clear how many aircraft are required to reach an efficient scale, whether it is 50 aircraft or 400 aircraft, or whether it ever happens.

== Track record ==
According to Halogen Guides, which covered the industry, the initial assumptions underestimated the complexity, overhead costs and peak demands. This has been further impacted by the dramatic popularity of fractional card programs. The card programs place even more owners against each plane; each owner enjoying fully guaranteed access with as little as a single-year, 1/32 share commitment.

Finally, the burgeoning diversity of structural offerings (fractional ownership, fractional cards, charter cards, ad-hoc charter) creates an environment where clients may employ a portfolio of solutions, tapping each alternative depending on the cost profile of each trip. Certain trips can be most economically served by fractional, card or charter. If a client gets to cherry-pick for each trip, the fractional provider typically absorbs the least efficient travel. Partly in response to this, the larger fractional companies now position themselves as "solution providers", and offer fractions, cards, charter and full aircraft management.

According to a 2006 Halogen Guides Jets survey, not one company boasted of sustained bottom-line profitability. Even Warren Buffett's NetJets lost $80 million in 2005, attributed to foreign expansion and U.S. efficiency losses (specifically, paying for higher-cost charter flights when owner demand outstripped capacity).

During the recession of 2007 to 2009, the largest fractional providers saw significant downturns in their business. NetJets, Flexjet, and Flight Options have all reported significant subsequent growth and have added to their fleets. But CitationShares, a unit of aircraft manufacturer Cessna, stopped selling fractional shares in 2012. Avantair, operator of a fleet of 57 Avanti Piaggio P180s, filed for bankruptcy in June 2013.

One strategic thrust has been the introduction of efficiency incentives to better align client behaviour with operating efficiency. Some companies have resisted these programs. If fractional ownership's appeal is the simplification of flight, that appeal is reduced when accompanied by a host of special pricing adjustments and incentive programs. Despite this marketing challenge, cost concerns have resulted in numerous efficiency-driven programs.

== Notable operators ==
Provider/ Aircraft Type	Turboprop	Very Light	Light	Midsize	Super Midsize	Large	Ultra Long Range
Airshare	No	No	Phenom 300	No	Challenger 350	No	No
Alliance	No	No	No	XLS Gen II	No	Gulfstream IVSP (used), Global Express (used)	No
AirSprint	No	No	CJ2+, CJ3 +	Legacy 450, Praetor 500	No	No	No
CB SkyShare	PC-12 (used)	No	CJ2 (used)	No	G200 (used)	No	No
Flexjet	No	No	Phenom 300	Legacy 450; Praetor 500	Challenger 350; Praetor 600	G450	G650; G700
FlyExclusive	No	No	CJ3	XLS	Challenger 350	No	No
NetJets	No	No	Phenom 300	XLS	Challenger 350, Latitude, Longitude, Sovereign	Challenger 650	Global 5000; Global 6000; Global 7500
PlaneSense	PC-12	No	PC-24	No	No	No	No
Volato	No	HondaJet	No	No	G280	No	No
West Coast Aviation Services	King Air 350i	No	No	No	No	No	No

== See also ==
- Air charter
- Air taxi
- Jet card
