= Regina K. Scully =

American film producer

- Occupations: Film producer; Philanthropist
- Years active: 2011–present

Regina K. Scully is an American film producer and philanthropist. Scully is the founder of Artemis Rising Foundation, an organization which produces documentary and narrative feature films focused on social justice issues. She has produced documentaries including Miss Representation (2011), The Invisible War (2012), The Hunting Ground (2015) and Won't You Be My Neighbor? (2018). She has been nominated for three Primetime Emmy awards.

== Career ==
Scully founded RPR Marketing Communications, a marketing and publicity agency in New York City, and Artemis Rising Foundation, an organization which produces narrative and documentary feature films focused on social justice issues. In 2011, Scully produced Miss Representation a documentary film directed by Jennifer Siebel Newsom, which follows how mainstream media's portrayal of women limits them from influential positions. As part of the film, Newsom launched The Representation Project, an organization which Scully serves as a board member.

In 2021, Scully served as an executive producer of What Would Sophia Loren Do? a film which follows her mother Nancy Kulik and her family and love for Sophia Loren, which was directed by Ross Kauffman for Netflix.

Scully has been nominated for two Primetime Emmy awards for serving as a producer on The Hunting Ground directed by Kirby Dick, The Tale directed by Jennifer Fox. and the television series Social Studies by Lauren Greenfield.

Scully won a News & Documentary Emmy Award for serving as an executive producer on I Am Evidence.

Scully won a Humanitarian Honoree Award from Women's Image Network Awards in February, 2024.

== Filmography ==
=== Film ===
Year	Title	Notes
2011	Miss Representation	executive producer
2012	The Invisible War	executive producer
2012	Rafea: Solar Mama	executive producer
2013	Anita: Speaking Truth to Power	executive producer
2013	Alice Walker: Beauty in Truth	executive producer
2013	Brave Miss World	executive producer
2014	Alive Inside: A Story of Music and Memory	executive producer
2014	Fed Up	executive producer
2014	Private Violence	executive producer
2014	Sold	executive producer
2014	The Club	executive producer
2014	How I Got Over	executive producer
2015	The Hunting Ground	executive producer
2015	Dreamcatcher	executive producer
2015	The Mask You Live In	associate producer
2015	Prophet's Prey	executive producer
2015	The Invitation	co-executive producer
2015	From This Day Forward	executive producer
2015	The Many Sad Fates of Mr. Toledano	executive producer
2015	Very Semi-Serious	executive producer
2015	Paper Tigers	executive producer
2015	The Trials of Spring	executive producer
2015	Janis: Little Girl Blue	co-executive producer
2015	Dogtown Redemption	executive producer
2015	CodeGirl	executive producer
2015	Thank You for Your Service	executive producer
2016	The Eagle Huntress	executive producer
2016	Under the Gun	executive producer
2016	Newtown	executive producer
2016	Lovesong	executive producer
2016	Audrie & Daisy	executive producer
2016	Maya Angelou And Still I Rise	executive producer
2016	I Voted?	executive producer
2016	Money Monster	executive producer
2016	Franca: Chaos and Creation	executive producer
2016	The Journey is the Destination	executive producer
2016	City of Joy	executive producer
2016	Swift Current	executive producer
2017	Unrest	executive producer
2017	Dolores	executive producer
2017	Step	executive producer
2017	The Departure	executive producer
2017	The Last Animals	executive producer
2017	The Reagan Show	executive producer
2017	Bombshell: The Hedy Lamarr Story	executive producer
2017	I Am Evidence	executive producer
2017	32 Pills: My Sister's Suicide	executive producer
2017	Eating Animals	executive producer
2017	The Rape of Recy Taylor	executive producer
2017	The Breadwinner	executive producer
2018	Generation Wealth	executive producer
2018	The Price of Everything	executive producer
2018	Won't You Be My Neighbor?	executive producer
2018	The Tale	producer
2018	The Long Dumb Road	co-executive producer
2018	The Way Madness Lies..	executive producer
2018	Be Natural: The Untold Story of Alice Guy-Blaché	executive producer
2018	This Changes Everything	executive producer
2018	Divide and Conquer: The Roger Ailes Story	executive producer
2018	Wrestling Ghosts	executive producer
2018	Cracked Up	executive producer
2019	Always in Season	executive producer
2019	The Great Hack	executive producer
2019	Clemency	executive producer
2019	Knock Down the House	executive producer
2019	Fantastic Fungi	executive producer
2019	The Kingmaker	executive producer
2019	Oliver Sacks: His Own Life	executive producer
2019	Ruth: Justice Ginsburg in Her Own Words	executive producer
2020	Us Kids	executive producer
2020	Aggie	executive producer
2020	On the Record	executive producer
2020	The Glorias	executive producer
2020	Feels Good Man	co-executive producer
2020	The Truffle Hunters	executive producer
2020	Gunda	co-executive producer
2020	Jacinta	executive producer
2020	Kiss the Ground	executive producer
2020	Love & Stuff	executive producer
2020	Athlete A	executive producer
2020	Surge	executive producer
2020	The Great American Lie	executive producer
2020	Driving While Black: Race Space and Mobility in America	executive producer
2020	The Life Ahead	producer
2020	A Crime on the Bayou	executive producer
2020	The Art of Political Murder	producer
2021	What Would Sophia Loren Do?	executive producer
2021	Bring Your Own Brigade	executive producer
2021	Rita Moreno: Just a Girl Who Decided to Go for It	executive producer
2021	Rebel Hearts	co-executive producer
2021	Ailey	executive producer
2021	Dear Mr. Brody	executive producer
2021	$avvy	executive producer
2021	The First Step	executive producer
2021	Paper & Glue	executive producer
2021	Pray Away	executive producer
2021	Citizen Ashe	executive producer
2021	Procession	executive producer
2021	You Resemble Me	executive producer
2021	Dionne Warwick: Don't Make Me Over	executive producer
2021	Mayor Pete	executive producer
2022	Marian Anderson: The Whole World in Her Hands	executive producer
2022	Sell/Buy/Date	executive producer
2022	The Return of Tanya Tucker: Featuring Brandi Carlile	executive producer
2022	Still Working 9 to 5	executive producer
2022	My Name Is Andrea	executive producer
2022	Hazing	executive producer
2022	Of Medicine and Miracles	executive producer
2022	Desperate Souls, Dark City and the Legend of Midnight Cowboy	executive producer
2022	Merkel	executive producer
2022	The Inspection	executive producer
2022	Gratitude Revealed	executive producer
2022	I Am We	executive producer
2022	Hollow Tree	co-executive producer
2023	Food and Country	executive producer
2023	The Right to Read	executive producer
2023	Pay or Die	executive producer
2023	The Great Divide	executive producer
2023	Common Ground	executive producer
2023	Uncharted	executive producer
2023	Of Night and Light: The Story of Iboga and Ibogaine	executive producer
2024	Gaucho Gaucho	executive producer
2024	Look into My Eyes	executive producer
2024	Songs from the Hole	executive producer
2024	A King Like Me	executive producer
2024	Satisfied	executive producer
2024	Mrs. Robinson	executive producer
2024	Familiar Touch	executive producer
2024	Lilly	executive producer
2024	A Man with Sole: The Impact of Kenneth Cole	executive producer
2024	The Inn Between	executive producer
2024	Viva Verdi!	executive producer
2025	The Librarians	executive producer
2025	Folktales	executive producer
2025	How to Build a Library	executive producer
2025	Move Ya Body: The Birth of House	executive producer
2025	She Runs the World	executive producer
2025	The Rose: Come Back to Me	executive producer
2025	Dear Ms.: A Revolution in Print	executive producer
2025	The Cycle of Love	executive producer
2025	The Bend in the River	executive producer
2025	All the Empty Rooms	executive producer
2025	Nuns vs. The Vatican	executive producer
2025	Island Willing	executive producer
2025	Marilyn Minter: Pretty/Dirty	executive producer
2025	The Wilderness	executive producer

=== Television ===
Year	Title	Notes
2020	The Vow	executive producer
2020	16 And Recovering	executive producer
2021	Allen v. Farrow	executive producer
2022	Phoenix Rising	executive producer
2024	Dante: Inferno to Paradise	executive producer
2024	Social Studies	executive producer
