= Hallee Adelman =

American author and filmmaker

- Born: Philadelphia, Pennsylvania, U.S.
- Education: Ph.D., Drexel University
- Occupations: Author; Film producer; Director
- Years active: 2018–present
- Notable work: Way Past Mad (and the Great Big Feelings series); Our American Family
- Spouse: David J. Adelman

Hallee Adelman is an American children's book author and documentary filmmaker based in the Philadelphia area. Her Way Past series of picture books, marketed under the name Great Big Feelings, is published by Albert Whitman & Company. She co-founded the documentary production company World of HA Productions with Ivy Herman.

Adelman's producing credits include the Primetime Emmy Award–winning documentary The Social Dilemma (2020) and the Academy Award–nominated Writing with Fire (2021). She directed and produced Our American Family (2022), which was reviewed by critics at The New York Times and the Los Angeles Times and profiled by The Philadelphia Inquirer. She is married to businessman David J. Adelman.

== Early life and education ==
Adelman was born and raised in Philadelphia. She holds a Ph.D. in learning technology from Drexel University and taught at all levels, from elementary school through university, before pursuing writing and filmmaking full-time. Adelman, who lives in Haverford, released her first children's book in 2019.

== Literary career ==
Adelman's debut picture book, My Quiet Ship (2018), illustrated by Sonia Sánchez, was reviewed by School Library Journal and was named a finalist for the Society of Children's Book Writers and Illustrators' Crystal Kite Award in the Atlantic region. Her next project, the Way Past series for Albert Whitman & Company, focuses on children's emotional development. In 2022, The Philadelphia Inquirer profiled Adelman as part of a group of Philadelphia-area authors working to diversify children's literature. That same year, Philadelphia Style highlighted Adelman's work across both children's literature and film.

Several titles in the series have drawn reviews from trade publications, including Kirkus Reviews, Booklist, and School Library Journal. The first book, Way Past Mad (2018), won a Parents' Choice Award. A later book, Way Past Jealous (2021), received a starred review from Kirkus Reviews and was named to Bank Street College of Education's annual list of the best children's books. The series had grown to twelve titles by 2025. Adelman has given author talks and readings at institutions including the Free Library of Philadelphia.

Selected bibliography
Year	Title	Notes
2018	My Quiet Ship	2018 SCBWI Crystal Kite Award finalist (Atlantic region); reviewed by School Library Journal
2020	Way Past Mad	2020 Parents' Choice Award; reviewed by Kirkus Reviews and Booklist
2020	Way Past Worried	Reviewed by Kirkus Reviews and School Library Journal
2021	Way Past Jealous	Starred review, Kirkus Reviews; also reviewed by Booklist; named to Bank Street College's Best Children's Books of the Year, 2022
2021	Way Past Sad	
2022	Way Past Lonely	
2022	Way Past Afraid	
2022	The Strongest Thing	Gold Award, 2022 Mom's Choice Awards
2023	Way Past Sorry	Reviewed by Kirkus Reviews and Booklist
2023	Way Past Embarrassed	Reviewed by Kirkus Reviews
2024	Way Past Mean	Bookstagang Best of 2024 pick, "Best Conversation Starters"; reviewed by Booklist
2025	Way Past Shame	Published by Albert Whitman & Company
2025	After: A Survivor's Story	Reviewed by Kirkus Reviews; named to the Child Mind Institute's Best Kids' Books About Mental Health, 2025; 2025 Foreword INDIES finalist, Picture Books; named to Bank Street College's Best Children's Books of the Year, 2026

== Filmmaking career ==
Adelman co-founded the production company World of HA Productions with Ivy Herman. Her early credits as producer or executive producer include The Social Dilemma (2020), a Primetime Emmy Award winner, and Writing with Fire (2021), an Academy Award nominee for Best Documentary Feature. She was also an executive producer on Art & Krimes by Krimes (2021), which went on to win a 2023 Emmy Award for Outstanding Arts & Culture Documentary.

In 2022, Adelman directed and produced Our American Family together with Sean King O'Grady, a documentary following a Philadelphia family's experience with generational addiction. It won the Audience Award for Best Documentary Feature at the 2021 Woodstock Film Festival; Natalia Winkelman of The New York Times and Noel Murray of the Los Angeles Times both reviewed the film. Ahead of its streaming release on AMC+, The Philadelphia Inquirer profiled the film alongside Adelman's work directing it.

Adelman went on to produce Daughters (2024), which won the U.S. Documentary Audience Award at the Sundance Film Festival and received a 2024 Peabody Award, along with the short documentary Death by Numbers (2024), shortlisted for the Academy Award for Best Documentary Short Film. Two more of her executive-producing credits, The Librarians (2025) and Speak. (2025), both premiered at Sundance that year. The Hollywood Reporter called The Librarians a "powerful documentary about American book bans," and the film went on to win the 2026 Primetime Emmy Award for Exceptional Merit in Documentary Filmmaking. Adelman was appointed to the board of directors of the International Documentary Association in 2020.

Selected filmography
Year	Title	Role	Notes
2020	The Truffle Hunters	Associate producer	Won the 2021 American Society of Cinematographers Award for Outstanding Achievement in Cinematography in Documentary Film
2020	The Social Dilemma	Executive producer	Netflix; Primetime Emmy Award winner
2020	Us Kids	Executive producer	World premiere at the 2020 Sundance Film Festival
2021	Writing with Fire	Executive producer	Academy Award–nominated (Best Documentary Feature)
2021	Art & Krimes by Krimes	Executive producer	Won the 2023 Emmy Award for Outstanding Arts & Culture Documentary
2022	Our American Family	Director, producer	Woodstock Film Festival Audience Award; reviewed in The New York Times and the Los Angeles Times
2022	Aisha	Executive producer	Won the Audience Award at the 2022 Cork International Film Festival; nominated for 10 Irish Film & Television Awards in 2023
2022	Your Friend, Memphis	Producer	World premiere at the 2022 SXSW Film Festival
2022	Broadway Rising	Executive producer	Premiered at the 2022 Tribeca Festival
2023	Invisible Beauty	Executive producer	Won the 2024 NAACP Image Award for Outstanding Documentary (Film); nominated for the 2024 Cinema Eye Honors
2023	Late Bloomers	Executive producer	Premiered at the 2023 SXSW Film Festival
2023	Story & Pictures By	Executive producer	A documentary about children's picture book creators Christian Robinson, Yuyi Morales, and Mac Barnett
2023	Tomorrow, Tomorrow, Tomorrow	Executive producer	Screened in the U.S. Competition section at DOC NYC 2023
2023	No One Asked You	Executive producer	World premiere at DOC NYC 2023; Audience Award runner-up, DOC NYC 2023
2024	Daughters	Executive producer	Netflix; won the Audience Award, U.S. Documentary, 2024 Sundance Film Festival, and a 2024 Peabody Award
2024	Death by Numbers	Executive producer	Short documentary; Academy Award–shortlisted
2024	My Sweet Land	Executive producer	Nominated for three awards at the 2024 International Documentary Association Awards
2025	The Librarians	Executive producer	Premiered at the 2025 Sundance Film Festival; the film won the Emmy Award for Exceptional Merit in Documentary Filmmaking at the 78th Primetime Creative Arts Emmy Awards in 2026
2025	Speak.	Executive producer	Premiered at the 2025 Sundance Film Festival

== Theater ==
Adelman, credited jointly with Ivy Herman, is a producer of Back to the Future: The Musical, which won the 2022 Olivier Award for Best New Musical.

== Personal life ==
Adelman is married to businessman David J. Adelman, CEO of Campus Apartments.
