= David J. Adelman =

American businessman (born 1972)

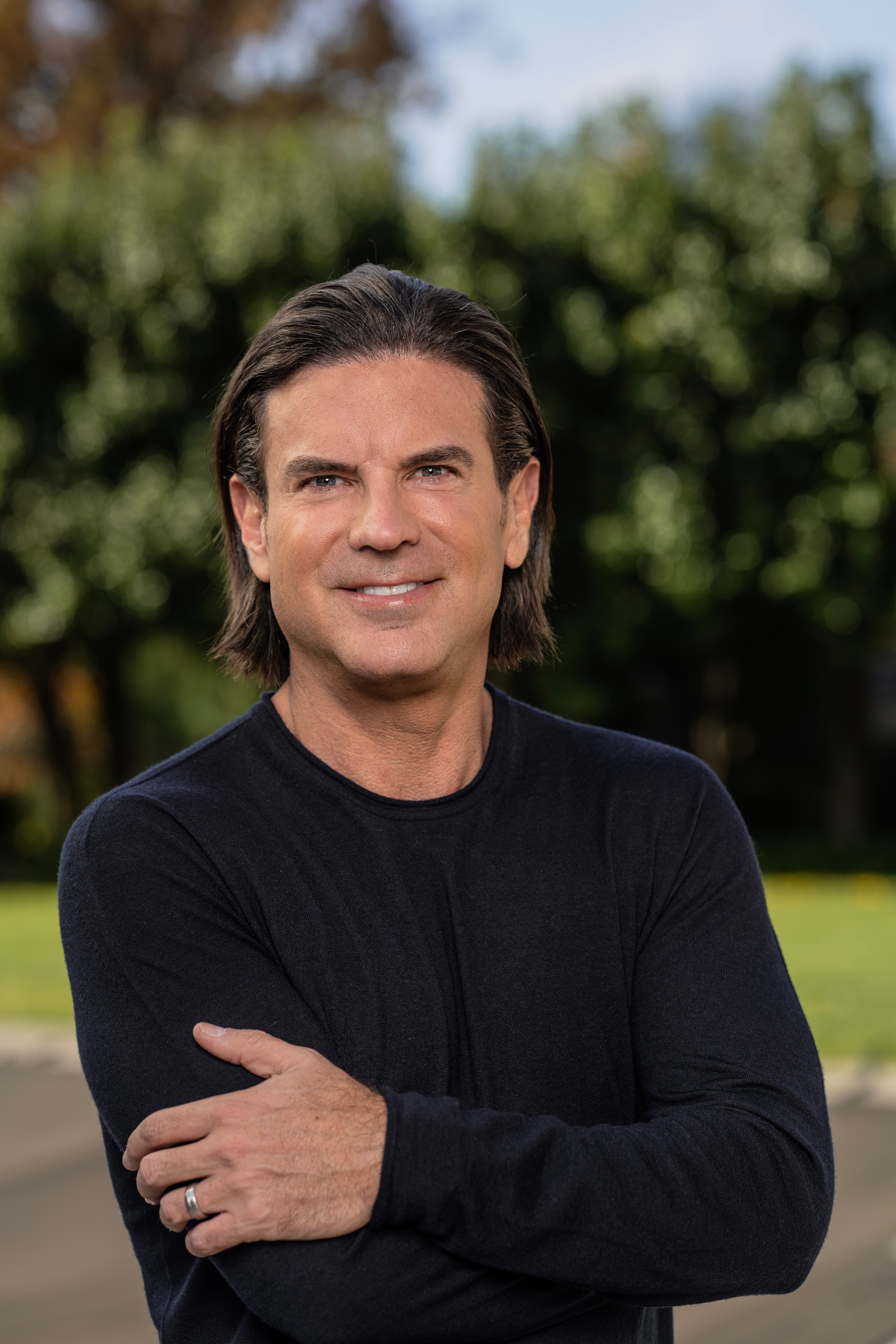
- Adelman in 2022
- Born: March 11, 1972 (age 54)
- Education: Ohio State University
- Occupations: Businessman; entrepreneur; investor
- Title: CEO of Campus Apartments; Limited partner of Harris Blitzer Sports & Entertainment

David J. Adelman (born March 11, 1972) is an American businessman and entrepreneur. He is the CEO of Campus Apartments, the co-founder and Vice Chairman of FS Investments, and the Founder of Darco Capital. Adelman is also a Partner in Harris Blitzer Sports & Entertainment, which owns and operates the Philadelphia 76ers and New Jersey Devils. His net worth was estimated by Forbes to be $2 billion in April 2024, ranking him #1,623 on Forbes' global billionaires list.

== Early life and education ==
Adelman was born to a Jewish family and is the grandchild of Sam Wasserman, a Holocaust survivor. He was raised in Penn Valley, Pennsylvania. Starting at the age of 11, the founder of Campus Apartments, Alan Horwitz served as a mentor to Adelman. At age 13, Adelman invested $2,000 of his Bar Mitzvah money with Horwitz and Campus Apartments. Horwitz invested those $2,000 in off-campus student housing near the University of Pennsylvania. At age 17, Adelman purchased his first solely owned investment property. Adelman attended Ohio State University and graduated with a degree in Political Science in 1994. While in college, Adelman worked in the accounting office and as a leasing agent for Campus Apartments. Adelman was accepted into the Temple University Beasley School of Law, but instead opted to become a Property Manager at Campus Apartments.

== Career ==
=== Campus Apartments ===
In 1997, at age 25, Adelman was named the CEO of Campus Apartments after Horwitz became chairman. As CEO of Campus Apartments, Adelman created a partnership between Campus Apartments and the University of Pennsylvania where off-campus apartments would be renovated. Adelman has worked to expand Campus Apartments outside of the realm of student housing at the University of Pennsylvania. Under his watch, Campus Apartments has built an extended-stay hotel and faculty condos on the University of Pennsylvania's campus and has built apartments at Franklin & Marshall College and Emory University. Adelman's guidance has resulted in Campus Apartments acquiring more than $2 billion in assets. In 2009, Adelman was named the MultiFamily Real Estate Executive of the Year. In October 2022, it was announced that Campus Apartments plans to construct a new 162,000 square foot headquarters on 41st and Walnut streets by 2026 featuring 136 new residential units and office space. In July 2024, Campus Apartments broke ground on a $148.75 million graduate student housing development at the University of Maryland, College Park, featuring a 323,000-square-foot LEED Silver-certified residential building that will provide 741 beds for the 2026-2027 academic year.

In September 2025, Adelman was named to the Multifamily Executive (MFE) Hall of Fame, and the honor was presented at the Multifamily Executive Conference in Newport Beach, CA in November 2025.

=== Entrepreneurial ventures ===
In 2007, Adelman co-founded FS Investments, a $24 billion alternative investment firm, with headquarters in Philadelphia. In February 2023, FS Investments merged with Portfolio Advisors, a private asset management firm, creating a combined company with over $73 billion in assets under management.

In 2013, Adelman, with group of Philadelphia-based investors, led a $30 million investment into private aviation company Wheels Up, founded by serial entrepreneur Kenny Dichter. Adelman serves as the Lead Director. On December 19, 2019, Delta Air Lines announced it took a stake in Wheels Up to become its largest investor and merged it with its Delta Private Jets subsidiary. On January 5, 2021, Wheels Up announced its acquisition of Mountain Aviation, the 10th largest private jet charter operator in the U.S., bringing its total fleet to 350 aircraft. On February 1, 2021, Wheels Up announced a SPAC-based IPO valued at $2.1 billion. The deal brings Wheels Up together with SPAC Aspirational Consumer Lifestyle Corp. that counts funds associated with luxury conglomerate LVMH and its boss, Bernard Arnault. It began trading in July 2021. In August 2023, Wheels Up enhanced its partnership with Delta Air Lines through a strategic $400 million financing agreement, with Delta becoming the company's largest investor alongside other strategic partners.

Adelman is also a co-founder of cred.ai, a FinTech company launched in August 2020, that uses AI to establish and improve consumers' credit.

In October 2020 Adelman co-led an investment into VIDE Beverages, a ready-to-drink vodka soda brand, with model, actress and entrepreneur Olivia Culpo.

On February 18, 2021, Adelman acquired a full ownership stake in American Harvest Vodka and Beach Whiskey as part of a newly formed Darco Spirits Company, under his Darco Capital umbrella. In March 2023, Beach Whiskey announced the launch of its new Beach Whiskey Canned Cocktails.

In October 2024, Adelman delivered a 'No Stress Leadership' talk at the University of Colorado's Leeds School of Business, where he shared personal experiences including becoming CEO at age 26 and emphasized the importance of balancing professional success with personal well-being through consistent routines and maintaining perspective in high-pressure situations.

In October 2025, Adelman, alongside Ron Biscardi, became an owner of the Philadelphia Wiffle Club franchise in Pro Big League Wiffle Ball (BLW), a 10-team professional wiffle ball circuit. The league, founded in 2020 by then-13-year-old Logan Rose, launched its first professional season on October 25, 2025, with the Western Wiffle Ball Classic at Scottsdale Stadium. The ownership group includes other high-profile investors such as entrepreneur Gary Vaynerchuk, former Milwaukee Bucks co-owner Marc Lasry, and entertainment group Dude Perfect.

=== 76 Place and Harris Blitzer Sports & Entertainment ===
In July 2022, it was announced that Adelman would chair 76 Devcorp, a project managing company responsible for developing 76 Place at Market East, a proposed new stadium for the NBA's Philadelphia 76ers located in Center City, Philadelphia. In October 2022, Adelman bought a 10% ownership stake in Harris Blitzer Sports & Entertainment from Michael G. Rubin, which owns and operates the 76ers, the NHL's New Jersey Devils, and the Prudential Center. On December 19, 2024, Philadelphia City Council approved Adelman's plans for the $1.3 billion 76 Place arena project in a 12–5 vote. The 18,500-seat arena, set to be built next to Chinatown, was scheduled to begin construction in 2028 with completion targeted for the 2031-32 NBA season. As part of the development, Adelman committed to a $60 million community benefits agreement supporting the city, school district, Chinatown, and minority-owned businesses.

=== Sixers / Flyers New Sports Complex Arena ===
As of January 12, 2025, plans to build the Market East arena near Chinatown were abandoned. Instead, Harris Blitzer Sports & Entertainment announced a 50-50 joint venture with Comcast Spectacor to build a new arena in the South Philadelphia Sports Complex that would house both the 76ers and Flyers. The agreement came after NBA Commissioner Adam Silver helped broker peace between the two companies, bringing an end to their long-running dispute over the team's future arena plans. Adelman has been instrumental in leading efforts to bring a WNBA expansion team to Philadelphia, collaborating with Comcast and other major stakeholders as part of a broader initiative to establish a new Sixers arena in South Philadelphia.

In October 2025, the Sixers and Flyers selected a joint venture led by Turner Construction and AECOM Hunt as the construction manager for the new South Philadelphia arena.The project's timeline was accelerated, with a targeted opening date of 2030 to coincide with the debut of Philadelphia's WNBA expansion team. Adelman, serving as Chairman of the joint venture between the 76ers and Flyers, stated the goal is to build "the most technologically advanced and fan-focused sports and entertainment venue in the world."

In April 2026, Harris Blitzer Sports & Entertainment and Comcast Spectacor confirmed the arena's exact location: the southeast corner of Broad Street and Pattison Avenue in South Philadelphia, the former site of the Spectrum. The project would replace the existing Xfinity Mobile Arena, which opened in 1996 and will be demolished upon completion of the new facility.

On September 8, 2026, the teams released the first renderings of the arena, featuring a facade of stacked, cantilevered bands inspired by the exterior of the Spectrum, the South Philadelphia arena that served as the 76ers' and Flyers' home from 1967 to 1996. Announcing the design, HBSE co-founder Josh Harris and Comcast Corporation chairman Brian Roberts credited Adelman, who chairs the joint venture overseeing the arena's development, among the ownership partners instrumental to the project.

=== WNBA Expansion Team in Philadelphia ===
On June 30, 2025, the WNBA officially announced that Philadelphia would receive an expansion franchise set to debut in the 2030 season, pending approval from the WNBA and NBA Board of Governors. The team will be owned and operated by Harris Blitzer Sports & Entertainment, with Adelman serving as one of the key ownership partners alongside Josh Harris, David Blitzer, and Brian Roberts of Comcast. The team will be based in South Philadelphia and is expected to play in the new arena being developed jointly by HBSE and Comcast Spectacor.

== Personal life ==
Adelman is co-founder of Jewish Federation Real Estate, co-chair of Jewish Federation of Greater Philadelphia, Chair of the Philadelphia Holocaust Remembrance Foundation and sits on the board of the USC Shoah Foundation. He is also an active member of Har Zion Temple in Penn Valley. In January 2024, Adelman offered a $25,000 reward through the Philadelphia Crime Commission tip line to identify a vandal who spray-painted a swastika at the Horwitz-Wasserman Holocaust Memorial Plaza, which honors his grandfather Sam Wasserman's survival story.

When the $36 million Alan Horwitz 'Sixth Man' Center operated by Philadelphia Youth Basketball opened in Philadelphia in July 2024, Adelman served as a lead donor, with the Adelman Family Stadium Court named to honor his longtime mentor and Campus Apartments founder Alan Horwitz, who initiated the project with a $5 million gift and whose passionate 76ers fandom earned him the nickname 'Sixth Man'.

He is married to children's book author and film producer Hallee Adelman. In April 2024, Forbes cited Adelman's net worth at over $2 billion.
