= David Bell =

David Bell may refer to:

== Academics ==
- David A. Bell (born 1961), American historian of France
- David Bell (university administrator) (born 1959), Scottish academic administrator and civil servant
- David Bell (philosopher) (born 1947), British philosopher
- David Bell (artist) (1915–1959), British curator and writer
- David Bell (author) (born 1969), American author and professor
- David Charles Bell (1817–1902), British scholar, author and professor
- David Elliott Bell (born in 1945), American mathematician and computer security pioneer

== Sportspeople ==
- David Bell (golfer) (1880–?), Scottish golfer
- David Bell (field hockey) (born 1955), Australian field hockey player and coach
- David Bell (baseball) (born 1972), American baseball player
- David Bell (basketball) (born 1981), American basketball player
- David Bell (sportsman) (born 1949), Scottish rugby union and cricket representative

=== Footballers ===
- Dave Bell (1909–1986), Scottish footballer
- David Bell (footballer, born 1985), Irish footballer
- David Bell (footballer, born 1984), Irish footballer
- David Bell (Australian footballer) (1890–1961), Australian rules footballer
- David Bell (American football) (born 2000), American football wide receiver

== Others ==
- David Bell (Australian politician) (1828–1894), New South Wales politician
- David Bell (Irish Republican) (1818–1890)
- David Bell (television executive) (1937–1990), Scottish television producer and director
- David Bell (VC) (1845–1920), Irish soldier
- David E. Bell (1919–2000), American civil servant
- David Bell (composer) (born 1954), American composer
- David Sheffield Bell, American physician, and researcher
- David Bell (publisher) (born 1946), American publisher

== See also ==
- David Belle (born 1973), French actor, film choreographer, and stunt coordinator
