= Penn Valley, Pennsylvania =

Unincorporated community in Pennsylvania, US

Penn Valley
- Unincorporated community
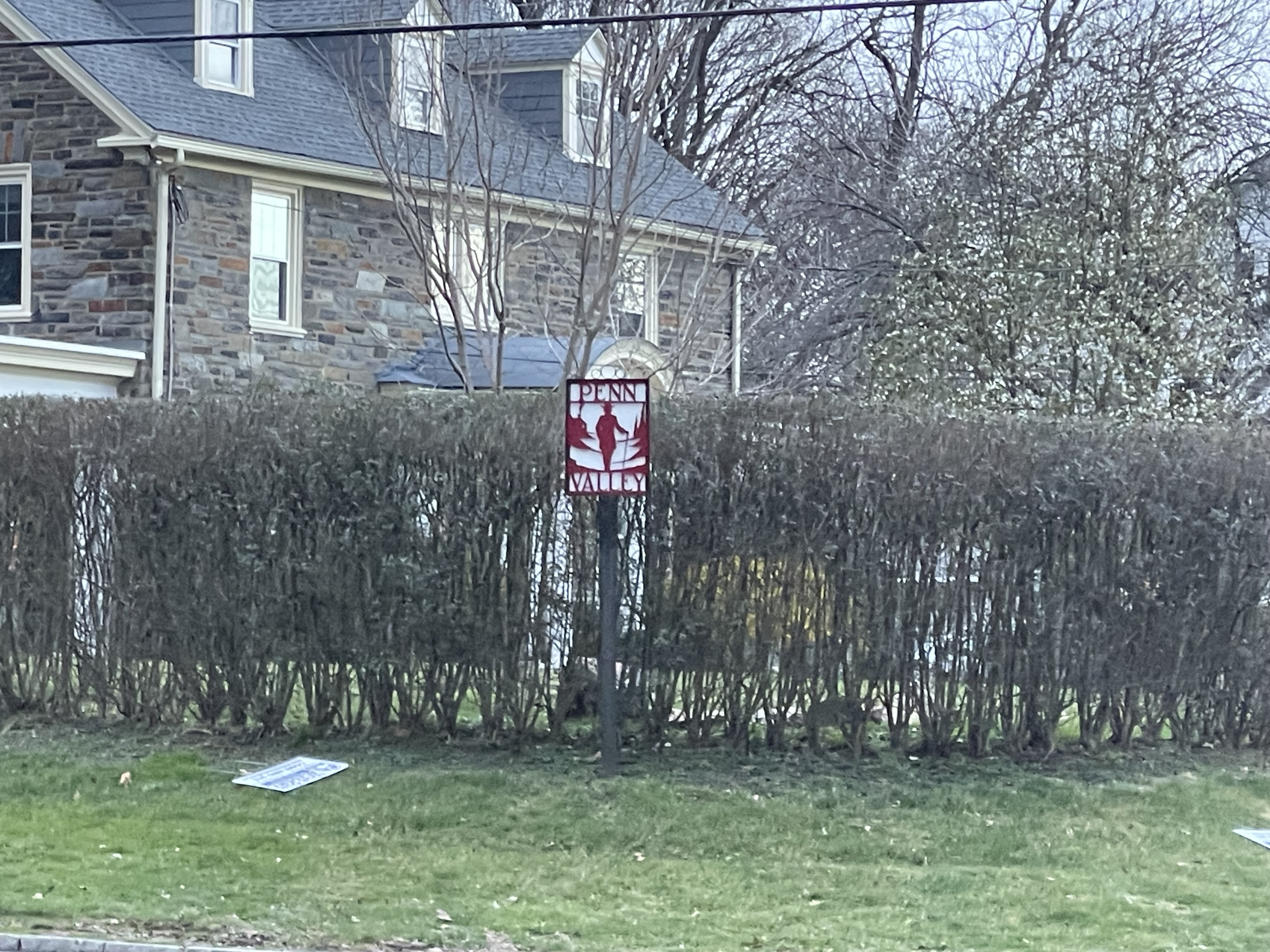
- Penn Valley sign on Montgomery Avenue

- Location within Pennsylvania
- Coordinates: 40°01′31.72″N 75°15′35.23″W
- Country: United States
- State: Pennsylvania
- County: Montgomery
- Township: Lower Merion
- Elevation: 90 m (295 ft)

Population
  - Total: Under 4,000
- Time zone: UTC-5 (EST)
  - Summer (DST): UTC-4 (EDT)
- Zip Code: 19072
- Area codes: 610 and 484

Penn Valley is an unincorporated community located within Lower Merion Township, Pennsylvania, United States. Despite sharing a zip code with Narberth, because the community does not have its own post office, Penn Valley is a separate and distinct community whose civic association demarcates its boundaries with iconic signs featuring William Penn and a farmhouse in blue or red on white, dating from 1930.

== History ==
Lower Merion was settled in 1682 by Welsh Quakers and in 1713 became a township with about fifty residents. Before 1930, what is now known as Penn Valley consisted of the areas of the township known as "Fairview," "Crow's Hill," and "Bowler's Woods."

Initially, Penn Valley was a farming community, known especially for Percival Roberts's 539-acre dairy farm, "Penshurst," and the smaller farms that surrounded it, located on PA Route 23 (Conshohocken State Road), Hagys Ford Road, and Old Gulph Road. It grew more suburban in 1939 when Penshurst's 75-room mansion was demolished in favor of residential development. Other farms in Penn Valley included "Crow's Hill", which was sold in 1921; "The Grove of the Red Partridges" on Old Gulph Road; and Charles W. Latch's 41-acre family farm. Today, silos can still be found in Penn Valley on Fairview Road.

A silo on Fairview Road

=== Penhurst Farm ===
Penshurst Farm was built and owned by Percival Roberts, scion of the Welsh family led by John Roberts that founded Lower Merion in 1682. Penshurst straddled Hagys Ford Road and Conshohocken State Road and extended through the hollow down to the banks of the Schuylkill River. The 75-room mansion built in 1903 was known for its magnificent English gardens and Old World ornamental fountains, a fish pond, and a terraced stairway, elements of which still stand as components of the residence that was subsequently built upon the property. The original mansion generated its own electricity, and its plumbing system was self-sufficient.

The dairy farm on the Penshurst property was one of the most productive in all of Pennsylvania, with modern milking machines and numerous barns. It had exquisite animals including a pack of award-winning Ayrshire cattle, which were known for eating alfalfa. The farm also had top-notch Berkshire hogs, chickens, and sheep. The farm likely had peacocks and pheasants because these remain common in Penn Valley. Penshurst milk was popular in the area because it was not pasteurized.

In 1939 the mansion was demolished and the items were sold at an auction. Most of the land was sold in 1943 to Home Life Insurance Company, subdivided, and built upon. The farm's water storage tower persisted into the 1980s on a terrace between the baseball and football fields of Welsh Valley Middle School and gave its name to the adjacent Tower Lane. It, too, was ultimately demolished when state authorities deemed it a safety hazard.

Today, the only remaining signs of the mansion are its former gates that can be seen as Conshohocken State Road bends left toward Gladwyne and Ardmore.

A picture of the Penhurst Mansion and reflecting pool

=== Penn Valley Women's Club ===
Penn Valley is the home of the Penn Valley Women's Club, built by nearby farmers as a schoolhouse and Sunday meetinghouse in 1826–1828. The original club was replaced with a new building in 1876. Although that building was razed around 1926, its remains can be seen today set back from Fairview Road as it winds steeply down to Route 23. Until World War II, the Women's Club was used to hold religious services.

The original Penn Valley Women's Club was repaired in 1951 and now is home to The Penn Valley Civic Association, the area's titular governing body. In 1978 this Women's Club was designated a historic site by the Pennsylvania Historical and Museum Commission. It was given repairs in 2016.

=== 200 Fairview Road ===
Another historic building was located at the corner of Fairview Road and Summit Road, a small frame house with a Queen Porch built for the Centennial. Even though the house had Class 2 Historical status, the township's Historical Committee allowed the house to be demolished after damage from a basement fire proved too costly to repair. The original house was demolished in August 2013 and a new house completed on the site late in 2014.

=== William Penn Milestones ===
During the period of the American Revolution, Benjamin Franklin, who was the United States Postmaster General, insisted on having stone milestone markers to keep postal riders on schedule. In 1793 the Mutual Assurance Fire Company of Philadelphia erected milestones to honor William Penn's family in return for its donation of land. Milestones 9 through 13 distant from the center of Penn's downtown grid were set within Penn Valley's limits. They have a mile number on their front and Penn's family coat of arms on the back.

=== Mill Creek Valley Region ===
The Mill Creek passes through Penn Valley on its way to the Schuylkill River. During the late 17th and early 18th centuries, 24 stone mills were located along the creek, which used its water power to process wool, paper, and gunpowder until early in the twentieth century. One mill owner, John Frederick Bicking, owned a paper mill along Mill Creek and ten acres where Summit Road meets Fairview Road. The Bickings family cemetery can still be found on Fairview Road.

== Demographics ==
The 2010 Census found that Penn Valley has less than 4,000 residents. Racially, 88% of Penn Valley's residents are Caucasian, 4% are Asian, 2.4% are Hispanic, 1.8% are black and the rest are two or more races, Pacific Islander, American Indian or another race. Of Penn Valley's Caucasian residents, 14.7% have Russian ancestry and 4.0% have Eastern European ancestry.

Penn Valley's median income is more than $100,000 per family, statistically in the top 0.3% of the United States. None of the children in the community live below the poverty level.

== Geography ==
Penn Valley is located between Narberth and Gladwyne in the heart of the northeastern tier of communities belonging to the Philadelphia Main Line, an area in suburban Philadelphia named after the Pennsylvania Railroad's original rail line to the West. The railroad runs from 30th Street Station in downtown Philadelphia due west through the communities of Overbrook, Merion, Narberth/Penn Valley, Wynnewood, Ardmore, Haverford, Bryn Mawr, Rosemont, Villanova, Wayne, Strafford, Saint Davids, Devon, Berwyn, Daylesford, and Paoli.

Most of Penn Valley is residential, except for parts of Montgomery Avenue, which separates the western part of Penn Valley from the borough of Narberth, its post office cousin.

Penn Valley is only a valley in some places. The Merion part of Penn Valley slopes steeply down General Lafayette Road and Woodbine Avenue to Gulley Run Creek, a tributary of Mill Creek; Hollow Road slopes more gradually down toward the Schuylkill River and an east-only entrance to the Schuylkill Expressway into an old ravine that ends in the river; and Conshohocken State Road/PA Route 23 slopes steeply from the gates of the former Penshurst Estate down to a hollow where it meets Mill Creek Road and bends in a 90-degree angle toward the steep slope that leads into the village of Gladwyne.

The highest point in Penn Valley is on the ridge above the playing fields of Welsh Valley Middle School, from which the tallest skyscrapers of Center City Philadelphia may easily be seen. Elevation at that point is 380 feet above sea level.

== Infrastructure ==
Lower Merion Township maintains its recycling and refuse burning center at the foot of Woodbine Avenue in Penn Valley, just beyond the limits of Belmont Hills, the easternmost section of the township that slopes down to the Schuylkill River, flanked by Fairmount Park.

Police and public works are managed in the Lower Merion Township Office Building at 75 East Montgomery Avenue in Ardmore.

Penn Valley is served by the Lower Merion School District, headquartered at the bend of Montgomery Avenue in Ardmore where it meets Church Road, across from Lower Merion High School's Hap Arnold Field.

=== Train stations ===
The Narbeth train station is located a scant mile from the "business district" of Penn Valley on Montgomery Avenue; Merion and Ardmore stations are roughly three miles to the east and west of the district, respectively. All three have heated, enclosed waiting areas, public restrooms, and pay phones. Taxi service is summoned by telephone. Approximately 10% of Penn Valley's residents take the train to work.

=== Buses ===
SEPTA's 44 bus runs through Penn Valley between Center City and Gladwyne, Pennsylvania, on weekdays.

=== Hospitals ===
Both Bryn Mawr and Lankenau Hospital are located within 5 miles of Penn Valley.

=== Libraries ===
Penn Valley is served by the Lower Merion Library System, part of the Montgomery County Library System and an affiliate of the libraries in Philadelphia and its suburbs. The Lower Merion Library System just renovated (2012) its Narberth Free Library, bordering Narberth Field on Essex Avenue; its Ardmore Free Library on Ardmore Avenue just south of the US Post Office (2013); and the system's central Ludington Memorial Library of Bryn Mawr at the corner of Bryn Mawr Avenue and Lancaster Avenue (Route 30) (2014). All of the libraries have a variety of books, audio-visual materials, and electronic resources.

Penn Valley has its own Little Free Library, which is a wooden box located on Hagys Ford Road between Margo Lane and Righters Mill Road. One must follow a certain procedure: In return for taking the book you want from the wooden box, you deposit another in its place.

=== Fire stations ===
The two closest Fire Departments are The Gladwyne Fire Station where Route 23 meets Rock Hill Road and The Narberth Fire Station on Haverford Avenue just above Narberth Park. The Gladwyne Fire Station's mascot is a dalmatian named Rowdy.

Gladwyne firefighters with Rowdy

== Wildlife ==
Before Welsh development, Penn Valley's forest was home to bears, cougars, wolves, rattlesnakes, otters, beavers, weasels, turkeys, grouse, woodland bison, trout, and bald eagles. However, after forest destruction by the Welsh and home building after World War II, most of the rarer animals left.

Today, the area is filled with squirrels, chipmunks, rabbits, white-footed mice, horned owls, red-tailed hawks, red foxes, opossums, skunks, raccoons, woodchucks, pheasants, songbirds, crayfish, butterflies, and white-tailed deer.

White-tailed deer occasionally pose a problem in Penn Valley. They can halt traffic, destroy the forest underbrush, devour expensive ornamental flowers, and spread Lyme disease. When last counted, Penn Valley harbored 44 deer per square mile, 34 more than the recommended average.

== Language ==
Penn Valley's residents primarily speak English. However, 3.5% of the residents primarily speak French.

== Education ==
=== Schools ===
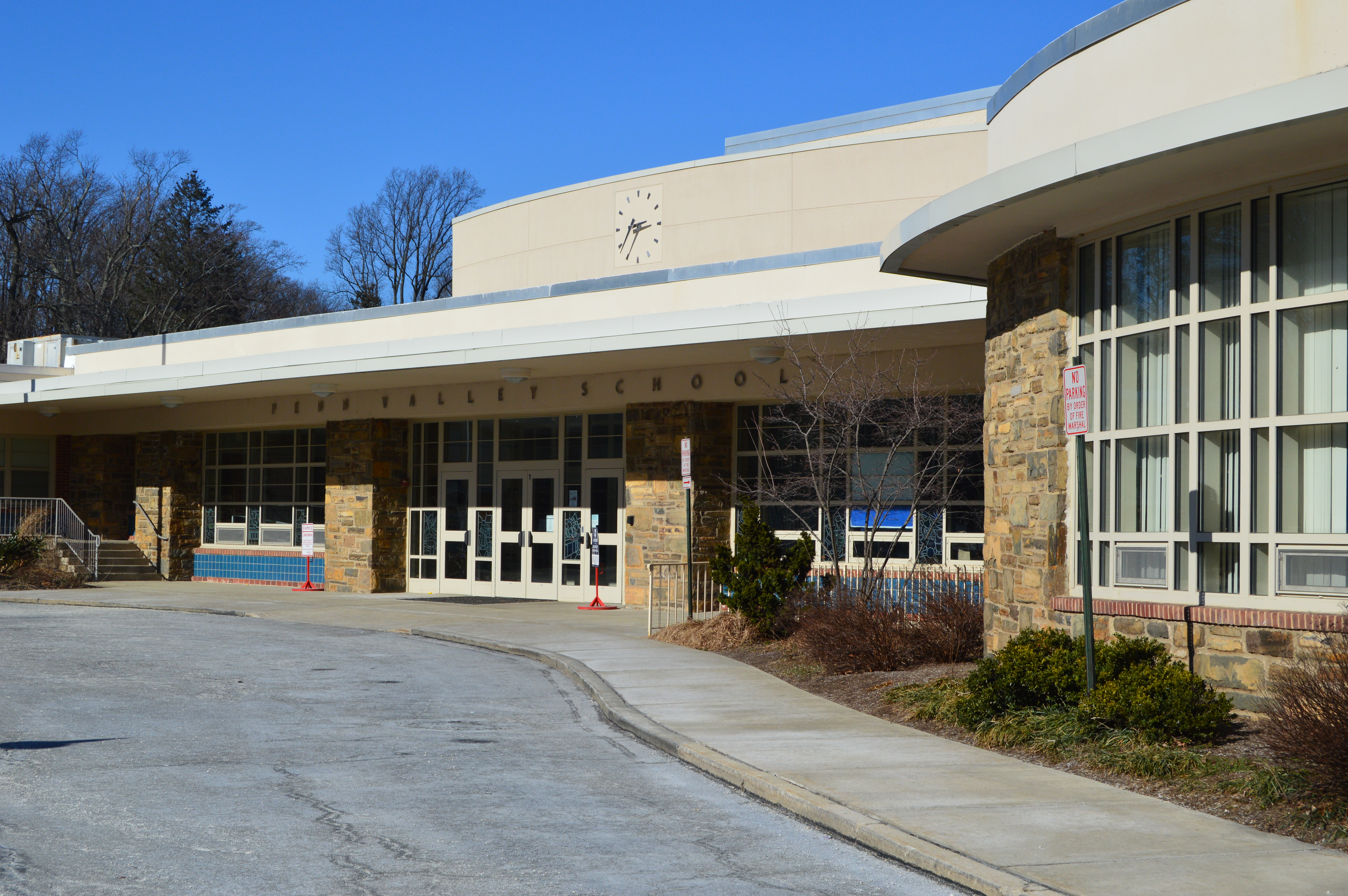
Penn Valley Elementary School

Nearly all of Penn Valley's public school children attend Penn Valley Elementary School and Welsh Valley Middle School, which are part of Lower Merion School District. Children and their parents may choose between attending Lower Merion High School or Harriton High School. Nearby private schools include Narberth's Roman Catholic St. Margaret's School; the all-male Haverford School; the all-female Baldwin School and Agnes Irwin Schools; and the co-educational Shipley School.

=== Colleges ===
While no colleges are located directly in Penn Valley, many campuses are nearby. Saint Joseph's University is no more than ten minutes away, with parts of its campus located in Merion and Bala-Cynwyd; and Villanova University, with its main campus along Lancaster Avenue/US Route 30 just west of Bryn Mawr. Other nearby colleges include Rosemont College; Haverford College; and the internationally renowned Bryn Mawr College

== Government ==
In the state legislature, Penn Valley lies within the boundaries of the 148th District and is currently represented by Mary Jo Daley; Amanda Cappelletti is its Pennsylvania Senator. In the U.S. Congress, Penn Valley is represented by Madeleine Dean. In the 2020 Election, Lower Merion voted 78% for Joe Biden and 20% for Donald Trump.

Penn Valley does not have a mayor or city council. However, it is represented in the Lower Merion Ward of Commissioners by Daniel Bernheim and Joshua Grimes.

Presidential Election Results
Year	Democratic	Republican
2016	75.45%	21.20%
2020	78.61%	20.73%
2024	76.86%	23.13%

== Press ==
Local events are covered by The Main Line Times newspaper; Main Line Life monthly magazine; Philadelphia magazine; and The Philadelphia Inquirer. Over the air waves KYW Newsradio 1060 AM follows events in the city and suburbs by the minute and local television stations KYW-TV (CBS 3), WCAU (Channel 10), WPVI-TV (6 ABC), WPHL-TV (PHL17), and WTXF-TV (FOX 29) broadcast news and entertainment 24 hours a day.

== Weather ==
Penn Valley tends to have hot, humid summers and cold, snowy winters. Precipitation in Penn Valley tends to be higher than the national average as well as higher than in Center City Philadelphia, thanks to its ubiquitous woods, proximity to water, and elevation above the riverbanks.

== Natural disasters ==
No recorded major natural disaster has ever taken place in Penn Valley. However, major natural disasters have taken place nearby. In the summer of 1972, torrential rains caused the Schuylkill River to rise well above its banks, flooding Belmont Hills south of the river and Manayunk north of it. In 1994 a 4.6 mb earthquake took place 46 miles from Penn Valley, with a maximum Mercalli intensity of V (Moderate), causing some damage in the Reading area.

In both 1994 and 1995, tornadoes took place within 20 miles of Penn Valley, resulting in four deaths and causing millions of dollars of property damage.

== Notable people ==
- David J. Adelman, CEO of Campus Apartments and the co-founder and chairman of FS Investments, grew up in Penn Valley
- Joe Banner, former President of the Philadelphia Eagles and former analyst with ESPN, lives in Penn Valley
- Charles Barkley, former professional basketball player for the Philadelphia 76ers, Phoenix Suns and Houston Rockets and current NBA analyst, owns a condominium in Penn Valley
- Aaron T. Beck, MD, American psychiatrist, creator of cognitive therapy and professor of psychiatry at the University of Pennsylvania School of Medicine, lived in the Wynnewood section of Penn Valley
- Judge Phyllis W. Beck, Esq., American jurist, the first woman member of the Commonwealth of Pennsylvania's Superior Court and professor of law at Temple University's Beasley School of Law, lived in Penn Valley
- Judith S. Beck, PhD, American psychologist and director of Beck Institute for Cognitive Behavior Therapy at the University of Pennsylvania School of Medicine, was raised in Penn Valley
- D. Dudley Bloom, Esq., American naval officer and businessman, the US Navy's youngest ship commander during World War II and the inventor of rolling travel luggage, lived in the Merion section of Penn Valley
- Elias Burstein, American physicist, theorist of solid-state optical telecommunications and professor of physics at the University of Pennsylvania, lived in Penn Valley
- David Crane, American television producer of the popular sitcom, Friends lived in Penn Valley
- Oliver Spurgeon English, MD, pioneer of mind-body medicine and longtime chairman of the department of psychiatry at Temple University School of Medicine, lived on Righter's Mill Road
- Jennifer Fox, American documentary film maker, lived in Penn Valley
- Richard L. Fox, American lawyer and author, lives in Penn Valley
- Richard J. Fox, American real estate executive and philanthropist, lived in Penn Valley
- Jim Gardner, American retired news broadcaster for 6ABC, lived in Penn Valley
- Hans Jacob Hagy, American paper manufacturer, supplied Benjamin Franklin paper for publishing Poor Richard's Almanack and other tracts, and the US Constitutional Convention (1787) for publication of the Bill of Rights from his mill on Mill Creek, built in 1769
- Ben Hibbs, American journalist, longtime editor of Country Gentleman and editor-in-chief of the Saturday Evening Post and Reader's Digest, lived in Penn Valley
- Vincent Kling, AIA, American architect and pioneer of modernism, lived on lower Righter's Mill Road in Penn Valley
- Josh Kopelman, American entrepreneur, venture capitalist, and philanthropist, lives in Penn Valley
- David W. Leebron, Esq., American academic, dean of the faculty and Lucy G. Moses Professor of Law at Columbia Law School (1996-2004) and Rice University's seventh president (2004-2022), was raised in the Weinrott family compound on Bryn Mawr Avenue in Penn Valley
- Garry Maddox, American Major League Baseball player with the Philadelphia Phillies and television commentator, lives in Penn Valley
- Aaron McKie, American professional basketball player, star with the NBA Philadelphia 76ers and former head coach of the Temple Owls college basketball team, lived in Penn Valley
- Marjorie Margolies Mezvinsky, American journalist and politician, US representative from Pennsylvania's 13th Congressional District (1993–95), lives in Penn Valley
- Edward D. Ohlbaum, law professor at Temple University, lived in Penn Valley
- George Brooke Roberts, American industrialist, president of the Pennsylvania Railroad and owner of Pencoyd Farm in Penn Valley
- Percival Roberts, Jr., (1857-1943) American industrialist, civil engineer and gentleman farmer, president of the Pencoyd Iron Works (later part of US Steel), expanded family's Pencoyd Farm to 571 acres and built "Penshurst", his opulent 75-room estate on Conshohocken State Road/Route 23, in 1903
- Bobby Rydell, American rock and roll singer, famous for Bye Bye Birdie (1963) and "Wild One," lived in Penn Valley
- Byron Saam, longtime voice of the Philadelphia Phillies Major League Baseball team on TV and radio, lived where Hagy's Ford Road meets Fairview Road in Penn Valley
- David Shulkin, American civil servant, former US Secretary of Veterans Affairs under President Donald Trump, lived in Penn Valley
- M. Night Shyamalan, American writer and director of Hollywood films, grew up in Penn Valley
- Steve Spagnuolo, American football coach and current Defensive Coordinator of the Kansas City Chiefs, lived in Penn Valley
- Lawrence H. Summers, PhD, American economist, US Secretary of the Treasury (1999-2001), president of Harvard University (2001–06); chief economic adviser to President Barack Obama (2009–11), and current Charles W. Eliot University Professor at Harvard University, grew up in the Merion section of Penn Valley
