= Foothill Productions =

Television and film production company

- Founded: 2018; 8 years ago
- Founder: Jamie Wolf
- Key people: Jamie Wolf, President; Nathalie Seaver, Executive Vice President
- Website: www.foothill-productions.com

Foothill Productions is an American film company that funds and produces independent films and documentaries. It was founded in 2018 by Jamie Wolf and produced films such as The Truffle Hunters, What Would Sophia Loren Do?, and the Oscar-nominated Walk Run Cha-Cha.

== Filmography ==
Year	Title	Role	Notes	Ref.
2026	A Mosquito in the Ear	Production	Drama	
2024	Viva Verdi!	Production	Documentary	
2023	Food and Country	Production	Documentary	
2021	What Would Sophia Loren Do?	Production	Documentary	
2021	Cusp	Production	Documentary	
2021	You Resemble Me	Production	Drama	
2021	Storm Lake	Production	Documentary	
2020	The Truffle Hunters	Production	Winner of DGA Award	
2020	A Crime on the Bayou	Production	Documentary	
2020	Us Kids	Production	Documentary	
2020	Mapplethorpe, The Director's Cut	Production	Biography	
2020	The Life Ahead	Production	Italian drama film	
2019	The Great Hack	Production	Documentary	
2019	Walk Run Cha-Cha	Production	Documentary	
2018	Be Natural: The Untold Story of Alice Guy-Blaché	Production	Documentary	

== Accolades ==
Walk Run Cha Cha was nominated for Best Documentary Short Subject at the 92nd Academy Awards.
