= DPJ =

DPJ may refer to:

- Delta Private Jets (ICAO: DPJ), a defunct American airline
- Democratic Party of Japan, a defunct Japanese liberal political party
- Dharmapuri railway station (Indian Railways station code: DPJ), a railway station in Tamil Nadu, India
- Donovan Peoples-Jones (born 1999), American football player
