= Desperate Souls, Dark City and the Legend of Midnight Cowboy =

- Theatrical release poster
- Directed by: Nancy Buirski
- Written by: Nancy Buirski
- Produced by: Nancy Buirski; Simon Kilmurry; Susan Margolin
- Starring: Bob Balaban; Ian Buruma; Michael Childers
- Cinematography: Rex Miller
- Edited by: Anthony Ripoli
- Production companies: Augusta Films; Foothill Productions; Cineflix Productions; Artemis Rising; Drymen Pictures; St. Marks Productions
- Distributed by: Zeitgeist Films; Kino Lorber
- Release dates: September 1, 2022 (Venice); June 23, 2023
- Running time: 101 minutes
- Country: United States
- Language: English
- Box office: $55,124

Desperate Souls, Dark City and the Legend of Midnight Cowboy is a 2022 American documentary film, written, directed, and produced by Nancy Buirski. It is loosely based on and inspired by Shooting Midnight Cowboy: Art, Sex, Loneliness, Liberation, and the Making of a Dark Classic by Glenn Frankel.

It had its world premiere at the 79th Venice International Film Festival on September 1, 2022, and was released on June 23, 2023, by Zeitgeist Films and Kino Lorber. It was shortlisted for Best Documentary Feature Film at the 96th Academy Awards, but it was not nominated.

== Plot ==
The film follows the journey of making and producing Midnight Cowboy (1969), as well as the era the movie was released in.

== Cast ==
- Bob Balaban
- Ian Buruma
- Michael Childers
- Brian De Palma
- J. Hoberman
- Adam Holender
- Charles Kaiser
- Jennifer Salt
- Lucy Sante (as Luc Sante)
- Brenda Vaccaro
- Jon Voight
- Edmund White

== Production ==
In May 2021, it was announced Nancy Buirski would direct a documentary film revolving around Midnight Cowboy, based upon the book Shooting Midnight Cowboy: Art, Sex, Loneliness, Liberation, and the Making of a Dark Classic by Glenn Frankel.

Buriski reached out to cast members from Midnight Cowboy, with Sylvia Miles passing away, and Dustin Hoffman being unavailable to interview.

== Release ==
The film had its world premiere at the 79th Venice International Film Festival on September 1, 2022. It also screened at the Telluride Film Festival on September 4, 2022. In March 2023, Zeitgeist Films and Kino Lorber acquired distribution rights to the film.

== Reception ==
On the review aggregator website Rotten Tomatoes, 91% of 33 critics' reviews are positive, with an average rating of 7.2/10. The website's consensus reads: "As engrossing as it is ambitious, Desperate Souls, Dark City and the Legend of Midnight Cowboy contextualizes a landmark film within the pivotal moment of its creation." Metacritic, which uses a weighted average, assigned the film a score of 66 out of 100, based on 6 critics, indicating "generally favorable" reviews.
