= SEC cybersecurity incident disclosure requirements =

2026 SEC rule

- Other short titles: Release No. 33-11216
- Long title: Cybersecurity Risk Management, Strategy, Governance, and Incident Disclosure
- Enacted by: the Securities and Exchange Commission United States Congress
- Effective: 5 September 2023

The SEC cybersecurity incident disclosure requirements are rules adopted in 2023 by the U.S. Securities and Exchange Commission (SEC) requiring publicly traded companies to disclose material cybersecurity incidents and to provide periodic information about cybersecurity risk management, governance, and oversight.

The rules amend reporting requirements under U.S. federal securities laws, including new disclosure obligations in Form 8-K and periodic reporting forms.

== Background ==
The SEC proposed cybersecurity disclosure rules in 2022 amid increasing concerns about cyberattacks affecting public companies and the lack of consistent disclosure of cybersecurity risks to investors. The SEC adopted the rules on 26 July 2023. The rule became effective on 5 September 2023. Regulators argued that standardised reporting would improve transparency regarding how companies manage cybersecurity threats and incidents.

== Overview ==
The rules require registrants to disclose a cybersecurity incident if it is determined to be material under federal securities law. If an incident is determined to be material, companies must generally disclose it on Form 8-K within four business days after the determination is made.
