= $avvy =

American documentary film

- Directed by: Robin Hauser
- Written by: Jessica Floum
- Produced by: Robin Hauser; Tierney Henderson
- Cinematography: John Behrens
- Edited by: Shirley Thompson
- Music by: Kathryn Bostic
- Production companies: Finish Line Features; Artemis Rising Foundation; Charles Schwab Foundation; Silicon Valley Bank; New Gen Finance; Flourish Ventures; Unleashed Productions
- Release date: April 1, 2021 (Santa Barbara)
- Running time: 79 minutes
- Country: United States
- Language: English

$avvy is a 2021 American documentary film directed by Robin Hauser, written by Jessica Floum. It follows the historical, cultural, and societal norms around women and money. Haley Sacks, Carrie Schwab, Farnoosh Torabi, and Sallie Krawcheck appear in the film.

The film had its world premiere at the Santa Barbara International Film Festival on April 1, 2021.
