= Amanda Jones =

Amanda Jones may refer to:

- Amanda Jones (inventor) (1835–1914), American author and inventor
- Amanda Jones (Miss USA) (born c. 1951), 1973 titleholder
- Mandy Jones (cyclist), British cyclist
- Amanda Jones (composer) (born 1988), American composer
- Amanda Jones (actress), New Zealand actress in Among the Cinders
- Amanda Jones, a fictional character played by Lea Thompson in the film Some Kind of Wonderful
- "Miss Amanda Jones", song by the Rolling Stones on their album Between the Buttons
- Amanda Jones (librarian), American librarian and anti-censorship activist
