= Air Partner =

UK business

- Industry: Aviation
- Founded: 1961
- Founder: Tony Mack
- Headquarters: 2 City Place, Beehive Ring Road, Gatwick, West Sussex, RH6 0PA; United Kingdom
- Area served: Worldwide
- Key people: Mark Briffa (CEO)
- Parent: Wheels Up
- Website: Official website

Founded in 1961, Air Partner is a global aviation services group providing aircraft charter services and aviation safety & security.

Charter work represents Air Partner's largest income stream at 87% of the group's profits.

In April 2022, Air Partner group was acquired by Wheels Up and delisted from the London Stock Exchange.

== History ==
Air Partner launched in 1961. It was initially based in the art deco Beehive Terminal, Gatwick’s original terminal with its grass runways. Trading as Airways Training, it began as a school for military pilots converting to civilian flying using flight simulators and a fleet of Beagles. The company then formed an air taxi operation with a fleet of Chieftain, Piper Aztec, 125 and C550 aircraft and changed its name to Air London. The decision to concentrate on aircraft broking was made in 1983.
