= Wheels Up =

American aviation company

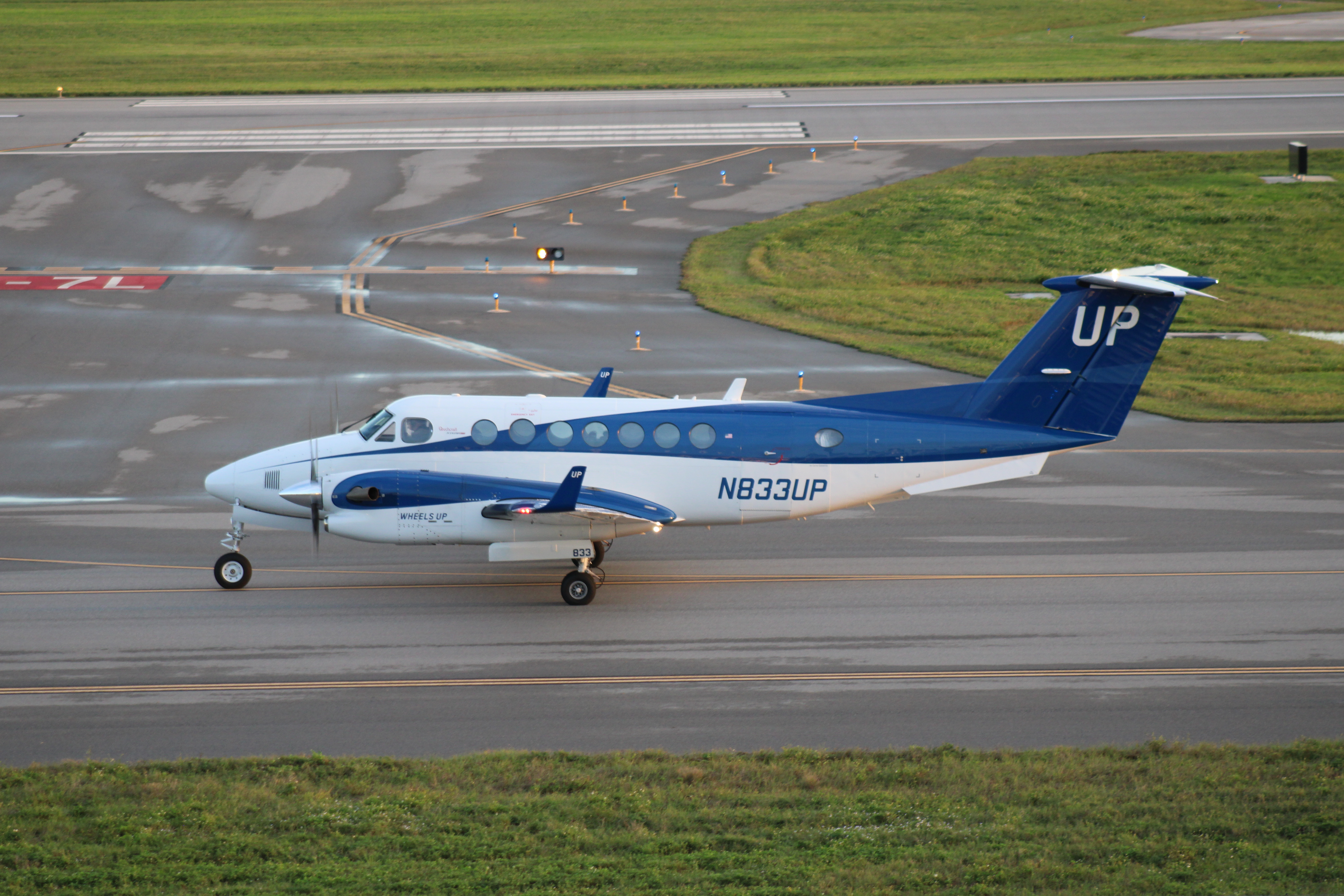
- Wheels Up Beechcraft King Air 350i
IATA	ICAO	Call sign
—	WUP	UP JET
- Founded: 2013; 13 years ago
- Fleet size: 185
- Parent company: Delta Air Lines (95%)
- Traded as: NYSE: UP
- Headquarters: New York City, U.S.
- Key people: George Mattson; (CEO); Adam Zirkin; (Chairman of the Board)
- Founders: Kenny Dichter; Bill Allard
- Revenue: ▲US$1.19 billion (2021)
- Operating income: ▲US$+203 million (2021)
- Net income: ▼US$−190 million (2021)
- Total assets: ▲US$1.98 billion (2021)
- Total equity: ▲US$730 million (2021)
- Employees: 2,500+
- Website: wheelsup.com

Notes
- Membership-based private aviation company Financials as of December 31, 2021

Wheels Up is a provider of "on demand" private aviation in the United States and one of the largest private aviation companies in the world. It was founded in 2013 by Kenny Dichter, using a membership/on-demand business model. Wheels Up members can book private aircraft from the company fleet and third-party operators using a mobile application.

The company was purchased by Delta Air Lines in August 2023, who bought a 95% share to rescue the company from financial troubles.

== History ==
The company was founded in 2013 by Kenny Dichter. The company announced its management team in August 2013. It confirmed a Beechcraft turboprop order for 105 King Air 350i aircraft in a transaction valued at US$1.4 billion, including maintenance. The company focuses on non-hub markets that commercial airlines service less effectively. Wheels Up's marketing strategy involves entertainment at major sports and cultural events for their VIP members throughout the year.

By 2014, the company had more than 1,000 members and had taken possession of 27 new King Airs and 10 fully refurbished Cessna Citation jets. After five years in business as a United States-only membership, the company had sold 5,379 individual and 379 corporate memberships and owned 72 King Airs and 20 Citations. In 2017, Wheels Up flew 59,960 hours and covered close to 15 million mi (24 million km). Wheels Up also flies Beechcraft King Air 350i, which has good short field performance, cargo capacity and seats nine passengers.

Wheels Up was a sponsor of American Pharoah at the 2015 Belmont Stakes, when the Thoroughbred won the racing Triple Crown, and signed with the Miami Marlins as the team's Official Private Aviation Partner in 2018. The company has also been involved in philanthropic activities for National Breast Cancer Awareness Month, when it took delivery of a pink King Air 350i, and Ovarian Cancer Awareness Month. In February 2018, Wheels Up announced a new flight sharing membership called Wheels Up Connect. Connect members can access members' only community boards to share flights with full program members. The goal is to democratize private flying by making it more affordable. In June 2019, Wheels Up announced it had acquired Travel Management Company, referred to as TMC Jets, a charter operator with 24 light jets.

In September 2019, Wheels Up announced it had purchased Avianis, a B2B platform that streamlines communications between operators and brokers. On March 2, 2020, Wheels Up announced it had acquired Gama Aviation Signature, the largest Part 135 charter operators in the U.S. In April 2020, Wheels Up launched the "Meals Up" initiative with Russell Wilson and non-profit Feeding America to provide meals for those impacted by food insecurity. To date, Meals Up has donated over 80 Million meals to Feeding America.

Following its acquisitions of Delta Private Jets, Travel Management Company, Gama Aviation Signature, Mountain Aviation, and additional regional providers, Wheels Up Group is now the second-largest private aircraft operator in the U.S. behind NetJets.

In January 2022, Wheels Up announced it had reached an agreement to acquire Air Partner PLC (LSE: AIR), a U.K.-based global aviation services group with operations in 18 locations and across four continents.

In November 2022, Wheels Up partnered with AirMed International as their aviation partner to bring medical services to Wheels Up members.

In October 2023, Wheels Up's private aircraft management division was acquired by Airshare, an aircraft provider based in Kansas. Airshare acquired 90 airplanes and 300 employees. At that time Wheels Up still had 215 aircraft.

In November 2024, Wheels Up announced the successful closure of a $332 million revolving equipment notes facility with Bank of America. This financial move facilitated the acquisition of GrandView Aviation's fleet, which includes 17 Embraer Phenom 300 and 300E aircraft. Alongside the aircraft, the deal encompassed associated maintenance assets and customer programs, marking a significant expansion of Wheels Up’s operational capabilities and service offerings.

== Financing ==
In January 2018, CEO Kenny Dichter announced on CNBC Squawk Box that the company had retained Bank of America and Goldman Sachs to explore "strategic initiatives".

On December 9, 2019, Delta Air Lines announced it took a stake in Wheels Up, to become its largest investor and merge it in the first quarter of 2020 with its Delta Private Jets subsidiary, itself operating 70 business jets, for a 190 aircraft fleet. On January 29, 2020, Wheels Up said its deal with Delta Air Lines to acquire Delta Private Jets had closed.

On July 14, 2021, Wheels Up became the first private aviation company to be publicly traded on the New York Stock Exchange under the ticker symbol of $UP following a merger with special-purpose acquisition company, Aspirational Consumer Lifestyle Corp. in the second quarter.

By May 2023, the company had seen many executives depart and had lost hundreds of millions of dollars since it went public less than two years earlier. The company was at risk of being delisted by the New York Stock Exchange. It was hoping to limit its losses to a maximum of $130 million during 2023 and is planning to be profitable in 2024.

On May 9, 2023 the founder and CEO, Kenny Dichter, resigned effective immediately, as the company faced mounting losses and potential bankruptcy. Board member Ravi Thakran became the executive chairman and Chief Financial Officer Todd Smith the interim CEO. The company's stock price had fallen to 40 cents from a high of $10 and the company value had fallen from $2 billion to $100 million. The 2023 first-quarter earnings report also released on May 9, indicated a loss of $101 million, $12 million more than its reported loss in the first quarter of 2022.

Dichter's departure arrangements were revealed in a May 9, 2023 Securities and Exchange Commission Form 8-K filing, which indicated will continue to receive his $950,000 annual salary for two years, he will remain a director on the company board, will receive a lump sum payment of $3 million, plus a prorated annual bonus based on the number of days he was employed, continue to receive company health insurance coverage and 200 hours per year travel on company aircraft, plus further benefits.

Aviation consultant Brian Foley indicated that the company will face a choice of securing additional investment from its largest shareholder Delta Air Lines, taking the company private again or further fundraising. Foley wrote, "reorganizing through bankruptcy is another possibility, and if a private equity or other acquirer ever became involved, would presumably be a prerequisite", although, a Wheels Up spokesperson said, "we are not considering bankruptcy."

The company's first-quarter 2023 financial report through May, indicated that though revenue increased $26 million year-over-year to $352 million, while net losses also increased $12 million year-over-year to $101 million. The adjusted earnings before interest taxes, depreciation and amortization (EBITDA) was similar year-over-year with a loss of $49 million, while the company's cash and cash equivalents fell from $586 million to $363 million.

On Thursday, June 22, 2023 the company's stock lost half its value following a Wall Street Journal story that it had hired a law firm that specializes in financial distress restructuring. As of June 2023 the company has never been profitable.

On Monday, July 3, 2023, in a Form 8-K filing with the Securities and Exchange Commission (SEC) made as the markets closed for the July 4 holiday indicated that Chief Financial Officer and interim CEO Todd Smith will receive a $150,000 raise in his annual salary and an increase in his bonus target from 100% of his salary to 150%. A week earlier board member Ravi Thakran was given $648,000 annual compensation, plus 50 hours of flight time in Wheels Up Beech King Airs.

On Wednesday, August 9, 2023, the company stated that even with the capital provided by equity partner Delta Air Lines, that there was "substantial doubt" about the company's ability to continue to operate. The company also postponed its second-quarter earnings call on August 9, 2023. The company also said it would sell its aircraft management assets to Airshare, a charter management company.

On August 14, 2023 the company filed a Form 10-Q with the SEC, reporting a working capital deficit of $720.8 million. The next day Delta Air Lines purchased 95% of the company with a $500 million price, assuming ownership, after previously having held a 20% share. As part of the purchase agreement, Wheels Up members can use funds on credit at Wheels Up to purchase tickets on Delta. Wheels Up customers also have access to Delta’s SkyMiles frequent flyer program and are given earn additional credits. These incentives are expected to bring more high-end travelers to Delta.

== See also ==
- Fractional ownership of aircraft
- AirSprint
- Flexjet
- NetJets
- PlaneSense
- VistaJet
