= Lessons from a School Shooting: Notes from Dunblane =

2018 documentary film

- Directed by: Kim A. Snyder
- Distributed by: Netflix
- Release date: September 28, 2018
- Running time: 22 minutes
- Country: United States
- Language: English

Lessons from a School Shooting: Notes from Dunblane is a 2018 American short documentary film directed by Kim A. Snyder. The film features, in the wake of the 2012 Sandy Hook Elementary School shooting, local clergyman Father Bob Weiss, who shares his experience with priest Father Basil O’Sullivan of Dunblane, Scotland, where a similar event took place in 1996.

The documentary was released on Netflix on September 28, 2018.
