= Alan Horwitz =

American businessman

- Born: January 16, 1944 (age 82); Philadelphia, Pennsylvania, U.S.
- Title: Founder and Chairman of Campus Apartments

Alan Horwitz (born January 16, 1944) is an American businessman and the founder and chairman of Campus Apartments, a student housing company headquartered in Philadelphia, Pennsylvania. Horwitz is also a superfan of the Philadelphia 76ers of the National Basketball Association and is known for sitting courtside at every 76ers home game wearing his "#76 SIXTH MAN" jersey.

Bloomberg News has described Horwitz as "one of Philadelphia's top real estate success stories."

== Early life ==
Horwitz was born to a Jewish family. His family moved to a wealthy neighborhood in Philadelphia at the age of five, after his father bought and built up an old property. Horwitz attended Overbrook High School.

== Business career ==
Horwitz founded Campus Apartments in 1958 after seeing a lack of affordable housing on the University of Pennsylvania's campus. Horwitz purchased properties around Penn's campus with the goal of building quality and affordable housing for students and later university faculty and young members of the workforce. Horwitz was able to capture the student housing market as he took advantage of the lack of competition in the business and because of the undeveloped area surrounding the campus.

Horwitz was a mentor to the current CEO of Campus Apartments, David J. Adelman. Adelman invested $2,000 in his Bar Mitzvah money with Horwitz and Campus Apartments. Horwitz invested those $2,000 in off-campus student housing near Penn.

== 76ers fandom ==
Horwitz has been described as an NBA superfan and has been nicknamed the "Sixth Man" of the Philadelphia 76ers and the "Sixers Jack Nicholson". Horwitz has attended 76ers games since the 1960s when the team played at the Philadelphia Convention Hall and Civic Center and has been a season ticket holder for more than 60 years. Horwitz notably kneels courtside during the games and has trademark handshakes with many current and former 76ers including Joel Embiid, Ben Simmons, Jimmy Butler, Justin Anderson, Lou Williams and Elton Brand. Horwitz also had a close relationship with T. J. McConnell who always jokingly knocked Horwitz's hat off his head even when going into the game. Horwitz also socializes with many of the players and will take them out to dinner and to Philadelphia Phillies and Philadelphia Eagles games.

Horwitz is still friends with many former 76ers players including Andre Iguodala and Evan Turner. Horwitz is also close with Joel Embiid's family including Embiid's father and sister. Horwitz was invited by Embiid to attend the 2018 NBA All-Star Game in Los Angeles, California with Embiid's father and sister. Horwitz sometimes travels on the team's airplane to away games.

Horwitz has been in multiple altercations throughout his time sitting courtside. During Game 4 of the first round of the 2009 NBA playoffs against the Orlando Magic, Horwitz acted as a sixth defender and stood as close to the baseline as possible on the final possession. Despite his efforts, Hedo Türkoğlu hit a game-winning three right in front of Horwitz. In 2012, the 76ers played the Lakers at the Wells Fargo Center. After a loose ball went out of bounds, Horwitz stared down Kobe Bryant and yelled "Get down the other end of the court, fellah. The ball's going this way, not that way." During the 2012 NBA playoffs, Horwitz was ejected from TD Garden during Game 1 of the Eastern Conference Semifinals between the 76ers and the Boston Celtics after making contact with Rajon Rondo. Horwitz sat in the press box with then Sixers' CEO, Adam Aron for the remainder of the game.

In the 2019 NBA Playoffs, Horwitz went viral online because of his action during the Eastern Conference Semifinals between the 76ers and the Toronto Raptors during the 2019 NBA playoffs. Horwitz attended both Game 1 and 2 of the series in Toronto, Canada and would stand up and shake a 76ers banner after every point scored by the team. In Game 2, Horwitz got into a shouting match with Canadian rapper and Raptors fan, Drake. During Game 4 of the same series, Horwitz taunted and then got into a verbal quarrel with Kyle Lowry after a foul was called. Lowry then asked official Josh Tiven to constrain Horwitz. Horwitz was described as "vociferous" by Mark Jones who was announcing the game.

Before a home game against the Memphis Grizzlies, on February 7, 2020, Horwitz appeared on court and rang the bell - a 76ers' tradition of ringing a ceremonial bell before the game. Other notable people to have rung the bell include Nick Foles, Bryce Harper, Meek Mill, M. Night Shyamalan, Kevin Hart and Charlie Manuel.

On June 8, 2021, a video between Horwitz and rapper Lil Baby trash talking each other went viral online. The video was filmed by rapper Meek Mill during Game 2 of the Eastern Conference Semifinals game between the Philadelphia 76ers and the Atlanta Hawks, with Horwitz and Lil Baby each representing their teams. The video was viewed more than 40 million times online.

On March 7, 2022, Horwitz was involved in an incident where he was apparently snubbed by 76ers shooting guard James Harden during a game against the Chicago Bulls. Harden, who was stretching near the scorers' table during halftime, was approached by Horwitz, who tried talking to him. However, Harden appeared to ignore Horwitz and walk towards the team huddle. The incident lead some in the media to question whether Horwitz had gone too far in his role as the "Sixth Man". It was later revealed that Horwitz attempted to speak to Harden about getting courtside tickets for his mother to an upcoming game. Following the incident, Philadelphia sports blog, Crossing Broad reported that Horwitz had been asked by the team to "tone down" his rhetoric and was previously suspended for a game in February 2022 due to such concerns.

== Personal life ==
In 2018, Horwitz donated $2 million to help build the Horwitz-Wasserman Holocaust Memorial Plaza on the Benjamin Franklin Parkway in Philadelphia to commemorate the victims of the Holocaust. The plaza is named after Horwitz and Sam Wasserman, a Holocaust survivor from Poland who later moved to America. The plaza is stone-paved and is surrounded by the rail tracks that were outside of Treblinka concentration camp. The plaza also has a grove of trees to represent the woods where the Bielski partisans hid and a digital eternal flame.

On January 21, 2020, it was announced that Horwitz was elected to the Philadelphia Jewish Sports Hall of Fame. A ceremony was held on April 28, 2021, at Rodeph Shalom where Horwitz was inducted and given the first inaugural Philadelphia Sports Spirit Award.

On October 15, 2020, Angelos Pizzeria of South Philly added "The Sixth Man" pizza to their menu to honor Horwitz. To celebrate this moment, Horwitz pledged a $1.76 donation for every pizza sold to Philadelphia Youth Basketball, a local charity.

Horwitz has been good friends with former Cincinnati Reds Hall of Fame catcher, Johnny Bench since 1967. Horwitz purchased more than $1 million of Bench's memorabilia and returned it to him in 2020.

In 2021, it was announced that Horwitz would donate $5 million to Philadelphia Youth Basketball to help construct a new $25 million, 100,000 square-foot facility in Philadelphia for the region's youth. The facility will be known as the Alan Horwitz 'Sixth Man' Center and will house 7 basketball courts, education facilities including classrooms as well as activities to improve the civic life of the city. Philadelphia Youth Basketball's Alan Horwitz "Sixth Man" Center, a new 100,000-square-foot facility in Nicetown, officially opened on July 10, featuring six basketball courts, classrooms, and educational programs aimed at serving over 6,000 youth annually through partnerships for meals, mental health services, and workforce development.

Horwitz is also involved in other local Philadelphia charities including the Sixers Youth Foundation, Simon's Heart, Learn Fresh, and Philadelphia Youth Basketball.
