= Glenn Frankel =

American author and academic

- Education: Columbia University (BA)
- Occupations: Author and Journalist
- Organization: The Washington Post
- Awards: National Jewish Book Award (1995); Pulitzer Prize for International Reporting (1989)

Glenn Frankel is an American author and academic, journalist and winner of the 1989 Pulitzer Prize for International Reporting. He spent 27 years with The Washington Post, where he was bureau chief in Richmond (Va.), Southern Africa, Jerusalem and London, and editor of The Washington Post Magazine. He served as a visiting journalism professor at Stanford University and as Director of the School of Journalism at the University of Texas at Austin. Author of five books, his latest works explore the making of an iconic American movie in the context of the historical era it reflects. In 2018 Frankel was named a Motion Picture Academy Film Scholar. He was named a 2021-2 research fellow of the Leon Levy Center for Biography at the City University of New York for a book about Beatles manager Brian Epstein.

== Background ==
Frankel was born in the Bronx, on October 2, 1949, grew up in Rochester, New York, and graduated from Columbia University in 1971. He began his journalism career in 1973 as a staff writer for the Richmond Mercury in Richmond, Virginia. After the Mercury ceased publication in 1975, he joined the Bergen Record in Hackensack, New Jersey. In 1979, he joined the Metro staff of The Washington Post. After spending the 1982-83 academic year as a Professional Journalism Fellow at Stanford University he became the Post's Southern Africa bureau chief, based in Harare, Zimbabwe, where he covered famine, war, and the struggle against South Africa's apartheid regime. In 1986 he moved to Jerusalem, where he won the Pulitzer Prize for "sensitive and balanced coverage" of the first Palestinian uprising. From 1989 to 1992 he served as the Post's London bureau chief, covering the political demise of Margaret Thatcher, the aftermath of the fall of the Berlin Wall and the first Gulf War. He returned to The Washington Post newsroom in 1993 where he served as Deputy National News Editor and editor of the Post's Sunday magazine, after which he returned to London for a second term as bureau chief. After leaving the Post in 2006, he spent four years as the Lorry Lokey Visiting Professor in journalism at Stanford, serving as faculty advisor to the Stanford Daily and The Real News, Stanford's only African-American news publication. From 2010 to 2014 he served as G.B. Dealey Regents Professor in Journalism at UT Austin and director of the School of Journalism. Besides writing for The Washington Post, Frankel's work has appeared in Vanity Fair, The Wall Street Journal, Politico, Mother Jones, New Statesman, Moment, Zocalo Public Square, and several anthologies.

== Books ==
Frankel's first book, Beyond the Promised Land: Jews and Arabs on the Hard Road to a New Israel (Simon & Schuster, 1994), won the 1995 National Jewish Book Award in the Israel category.

His second, Rivonia's Children: Three Families and the Cost of Conscience in White South Africa (Farrar, Straus, and Giroux, 1999) was a finalist in 2000 for the Alan Paton Award, South Africa's highest literary prize for non-fiction. He was awarded an Alicia Patterson Journalism Fellowship for book research.

The Searchers: The Making of an American Legend (Bloomsbury, 2013) was a New York Times and Los Angeles Times bestseller and a finalist for the 2013 L.A Times Book Prize. It was named one of Library Journal's Top Ten Books of 2013 and won the Richard Wall Memorial Award for exemplary research from the Theatre Library Association.

High Noon: The Hollywood Blacklist and the Making of an American Classic (Bloomsbury, 2017) was an L.A Times bestseller. "Frankel reviews the now familiar history of the blacklist with grace and accuracy," wrote an L.A. Times Review. "His descriptions of witness testimony are particularly vivid...Fascinating."

Frankel was named a 2018 Motion Picture Academy Film Scholar and awarded a $25,000 grant to aid his research for a book project on New York in the 1960s and the making of the film Midnight Cowboy. The book, Shooting Midnight Cowboy: Art, Sex, Loneliness, Liberation and the Making of a Dark Classic, was published by Farrar, Straus and Giroux in 2021. The book inspired Nancy Buirski's 2022 film documentary, Desperate Souls, Dark City, and the Legend of Midnight Cowboy.
