= Tequila Avión =

Alcohol produced in Mexico

- Type: Premium tequila
- Manufacturer: PRODUCTOS FINOS DE AGAVE, S.A. DE C.V..
- Distributor: Avión Spirits LLC
- Origin: Mexico
- Introduced: 2009
- Alcohol by volume: 40% abv
- Proof (US): 80
- Colour: Reposado (aged six months), Silver and Añejo (aged two years)
- Website: Tequila Avion

Tequila Avión (NOM 1416, DOT 138) is produced in Jalisco, Mexico, from the Agave grown at the highest elevations. Tequila Avión won multiple awards in the 2011 and 2012 San Francisco World Spirits Competition. The drink's parent company was founded by Ken Austin and aviation entrepreneur Kenny Dichter in 2009.

== Products ==
- Avión Silver
- Avión Reposado
- Avión Anejo
- Avión Espresso
- Avión Reserva 44

== In popular culture ==
Tequila Avión was featured in multiple episodes on HBO's show Entourage throughout seasons 7 and 8. Avión received this promotional spot for free. Avión was also featured in the 2015 motion picture follow up Entourage. The story of the Avión brand was disclosed in a comprehensive article in New York's Resident magazine.

== Awards ==
- 2012 Best Tasting Unaged White Spirit San Francisco World Spirits Competition
- 2012 Best Tasting Tequila San Francisco World Spirits Competition
- 2012 Double Gold San Francisco World Spirits Competition
- 2011 Gold Medal San Francisco World Spirits Competition
- 2011 Silver Medal San Francisco World Spirits Competition
