= Kenny Dichter =

American entrepreneur (born 1968)

- Born: January 16, 1968 (age 58)
- Citizenship: United States
- Education: University of Wisconsin (B.A., 1990)
- Occupations: Founder of Wheels Up, Entrepreneur

Kenny Dichter (born January 16, 1968) is an American entrepreneur and founder of publicly traded aviation company, Wheels Up. He also co-founded Alphabet City Sports Records, Marquis Jet, and Tequila Avión.

== Career ==
=== Alphabet City Sports Records ===
After graduating from the University of Wisconsin in 1990, Dichter founded Alphabet City Sports Records with friend Jesse Itzler. The label focused on creating and selling songs that were frequently heard in sports stadiums and arenas. The firm was eventually sold to SFX Entertainment in 1998 for $4.3 million in cash and stock.

=== Marquis Jet ===
Dichter founded Marquis Jet in 2001, the first fractional card jet program. By 2007, the firm was turning over more than $700 million per year from its 3,500 customers. In November 2010, Dichter sold Marquis Jet to NetJets, a subsidiary of Warren Buffett's Berkshire Hathaway.

=== Tequila Avión ===
Tequila Avión, a brand of tequila, was founded by Dichter and Ken Austin. The brand was named the 'Best Tequila in the World' and 'Best White Spirit in the World' at the 2012 San Francisco World Spirits Competition. The company was acquired by Pernod Ricard for $100 million.

=== Wheels Up ===
A few years after the sale of Marquis Jet, Dichter re-entered the private aviation industry by founding Wheels Up. Rather than a fractional card program, Wheels Up is a membership-based business that charges users per flight hour without spending requirements or time commitments. In July 2021, Wheels Up became the first private-aviation company to publicly trade on the New York Stock Exchange.

Dichter stepped down as CEO in May 2023 with a Securities and Exchange Commission Form 8-K showing that he will continue to receive his $950,000 annual salary for two years and that he will remain a director on the company board, among other pay and benefits on departure. Prior to an August 2023 $500 million funding round by Delta Air Lines for Wheels Up, Delta’s CEO Ed Bastian noted that “Kenny Dichter has done a masterful job over the last decade building a high-quality brand, great experience, a lot of new members.”

=== REAL SLX ===
In 2024, Dichter launched REAL SLX, a global sports and lifestyle membership club focused on hospitality and access to sports, entertainment, and cultural events. The platform offers curated, invitation-based experiences for its members. REAL SLX forms part of Dichter’s broader work in developing lifestyle-oriented ventures centred on events and experiential access.launched REAL SLX, a global sports and lifestyle experience club offering high-touch hospitality and insider access to sports, entertainment and cultural events.

=== REAL JET ===
In 2025, Dichter expanded the REAL SLX platform with the launch of REAL JET, a boutique private aviation brokerage designed to simplify travel through on-demand access to premium aircraft. The company claims to operate without membership fees or long-term contracts. Targeting both first-time private flyers and small to midsize businesses, REAL JET positions itself as an alternative to traditional jet card programs.
