= I Remember Me =

- Poster for the film
- Directed by: Kim A. Snyder
- Release date: 2000
- Running time: 74 minutes
- Country: United States
- Language: English

I Remember Me is a 2000 biographical documentary about chronic fatigue syndrome, filmed in the United States by Kim A. Snyder. The film attempts to show just how devastating the illness can be to afflicted persons.

Snyder's travels are chronicled for four years as she tries to find answers about the mysterious illness with which she was diagnosed. The motivation for Snyder was her fluctuating partial improvements followed by relapses of debilitating symptoms she experienced. Snyder was given many contradictory diagnoses for her symptoms along with various drugs that were of no help to her.

The movie explains that there are medical experts who refuse to believe the illness exists, and among those that do, no one knows what causes it, how a person acquires it, or how it may be cured.

Snyder's movie researches the history of the disease which takes her to Florida where a cluster outbreak occurred in 1956, and to Lake Tahoe Nevada where many people became ill in the mid-1980s. The Florida victims were women who were "described in a medical journal as having hysterical paralysis." She interviewed several of the women who became ill and later recovered. A group still meets to discuss their experiences with the illness. The Nevada group was a severe outbreak and Snyder interviewed treating doctor Daniel Peterson along with several of his patients. Peterson describes how the Centers for Disease Control investigated, but he does not believe that they intended to take the illness seriously. Peterson takes the illness very seriously, and seven of his patients have died by suicide.

Several other notable individuals with Chronic fatigue syndrome are interviewed, and they clearly express their lengthy "excruciating misery" in battling the illness. The interviews included movie director Blake Edwards, United States Olympic soccer gold medalist Michelle Akers, and a high school senior in Connecticut, bedridden for two years who is transported by ambulance to his high school graduation.

Snyder thoroughly investigates the illness, but by the end of the movie few of the answers she sought at the beginning of her quest have been found.

Snyder is a New York-based filmmaker who has worked widely on not-for-profit projects in the film world. Kim was struck down with CFIDS (Chronic Fatigue Immune Dysfunction Syndrome) in the mid-1990s while working as an assistant producer with Jodie Foster on Home For the Holidays.

== Cast ==
Listed by the Internet Movie Database:

- Kim A. Snyder ... Narrator
- Michelle Akers ... Herself
- Jan Armstrong ... Himself - local pastor, Truckee / Tahoe, NV
- Faye Austin ... Herself - patient, Punta Gorda, FL
- Gussie Baker ... Herself - patient, Punta Gorda, FL
- David Bell M.D. ... Himself - physician, Lyndonville, NY
- Kelly Blank ... Herself - relative of a patient
- Blake Edwards ... Himself - patient
- D.A. Henderson M.D. ... Himself - researcher, Johns Hopkins
- David Hyde M.D. ... Himself - physician
- Jay Levy M.D. ... Himself - immunologist
- Frances Malone ... Herself - patient, Punta Gorda, FL
- Peter Manu M.D. ... Himself - psychiatrist
- Pat McCloud ... Herself - a patient
- Martha McCormick ... Herself - patient, Punta Gorda, FL
- Stephen Paganetti ... Himself - patient, Durham, CT
- Heidi Pask ... Herself - patient at age 12
- Daniel Peterson M.D. ... Himself - physician, Tahoe, NV
- Jean Pollard ... Herself - mother of a patient, Lyndonville, NY
- William Reeves M.D. ... Himself - CDC researcher
- Peter Rowe M.D. ... Himself - researcher at Johns Hopkins
- Robert Shedd M.D. ... Himself - Florida physician
- Alexis Shelakov M.D. ... Himself - researcher, Salk Institute
- Dan Steinmeyer ... Himself - former spokesperson, Incline Village
- Maryan Wiedenfeld ... Herself - sister of a patient
- Leo Wotitzky ... Himself - husband of a patient

== Awards ==
- WINNER, BEST DOCUMENTARY STARZ PEOPLES’ CHOICE AWARD, 2000, DENVER FILM FESTIVAL
- HONORABLE MENTION, GOLDEN STARFISH DOCUMENTARY AWARD, 2000, HAMPTONS FILM FESTIVAL
- FIRST RUNNER UP, AUDIENCE AWARD BEST FEATURE, 2001, SARASOTA FILM FESTIVAL

== See also ==
- List of people with chronic fatigue syndrome
