= David Bell (Australian footballer) =

Australian rules footballer

Personal information
- Full name: David George Bell
- Born: 26 June 1890; East Melbourne, Victoria
- Died: 20 September 1961 (aged 71); Mildura, Victoria
- Original team: Caulfield
- Position: Follower

Playing career^{1}
Years	Club	Games (Goals)
1909–10	Melbourne	16 (4)
- ^{1} Playing statistics correct to the end of 1910.

David George Bell (26 June 1890 – 20 September 1961) was an Australian rules footballer who played with Melbourne in the Victorian Football League (VFL).
