= Death by Numbers =

2024 documentary short film by Kim A. Snyder

- Official poster
- Directed by: Kim A. Snyder
- Screenplay by: Sam Fuentes
- Produced by: Kim A. Snyder; Janique L. Robillard; Maria Cuomo Cole
- Starring: Sam Fuentes; Ivy Schamis
- Cinematography: Emily Topper; Paulius Kontijevas; Derek Wiesehahn
- Edited by: Luis Alvarez y Alvarez; Galen Summer; Maria Gabriela Torres; Zachary Obid
- Music by: Ólafur Arnalds
- Animation by: Dave Bradley; DJ Ferro, Tim Pachua for Alkemy X
- Production company: Cuomo Cole Productions
- Release date: October 5, 2024 (Hamptons)
- Running time: 33 minutes
- Country: United States
- Language: English

Death by Numbers is a 2024 American documentary short film co-produced and directed by Kim A. Snyder. The film, in which Sam, a survivor of the 2018 Parkland school shooting, confronts her assailant in a poetic journey to empowerment and features extensive footage from the ensuing trial. It had its world premiere on October 5, 2024 at the Hamptons International Film Festival, and was later screened at the Woodstock Film Festival on October 19.

On January 23, 2025, it was nominated for the Best Documentary Short Film at the 97th Academy Awards.

== Cast ==
- Sam Fuentes
- Ivy Schamis

== Release ==
Death by Numbers had its world premiere at the 32nd Hamptons International Film Festival on October 5, 2024.

On October 19, it was presented in the 25th Woodstock Film Festival as special event.

The film was showcased at the Doc NYC on November 20, 2024 in the Short Caretakers programme.

In December 2024, it was shortlisted for Best Documentary Short Film at the 97th Academy Awards, and was announced as a nominee in January 2025.

== Accolades ==
| Award | Date of ceremony | Category | Recipient(s) | Result | Ref. |
|---|---|---|---|---|---|
| Montclair Film Festival | 27 October 2024 | Short Film Jury Awards | Death by Numbers | Won | |
| Academy Awards | March 2, 2025 | Best Documentary Short Film | Death by Numbers | Nominated | |
| Aspen Shortsfest | April 5, 2025 | Audience Award | Death by Numbers | Won | |

== See also ==
- Academy Award for Best Documentary Short Film
- Submissions for Best Documentary Short Academy Award
