= Edward D. Ohlbaum =

American law professor

Edward Ohlbaum
- Born: Edward D. Ohlbaum; New Rochelle, New York
- Died: 2014
- Other name: Eddie Ohlbaum
- Education: Temple University; Wesleyan University
- Occupation: Professor
- Years active: 1985–2014

Edward "Eddie" Ohlbaum (died 2014) was an American law professor at Temple University.

== Biography ==
Ohlbaum was born in New Rochelle, New York. He attended Wesleyan University, where he completed undergraduate degree in 1972 and master's degree in 1973. In 1976, he received JD from the Temple University.

In 1985, he joined Temple University as the Jack E. Feinberg Professor of Litigation. In 1993, he became full professor.

== Awards and recognition ==
- Friel-Scanlon Prize in 2001
- Cesare Beccaria Award in 1998

== Bibliography ==
- Ohlbaum on the Pennsylvania Rules of Evidence
- Courtroom Evidence: A Teaching Commentary and its Supplement of Courtroom Vignettes
- Pennsylvania Benchbook for Criminal Proceedings
