= What Would Sophia Loren Do? =

- Official poster
- Directed by: Ross Kauffman
- Produced by: Robin Honan; Regina K. Scully; Ross Kauffman
- Starring: Nancy Kulik; Sophia Loren
- Cinematography: Ross Kauffman; Sam Cullman; Andre Lascaris; Josh Salzman
- Edited by: Keiko Deguchi; Hypatia Porter
- Production companies: Artemis Rising Foundation; Red Light Films
- Distributed by: Netflix
- Release date: January 15, 2021 (United States)
- Running time: 32 minutes
- Country: United States
- Languages: English; Italian

What Would Sophia Loren Do? is a 2021 American documentary short film, directed by Ross Kauffman. It follows Nancy Kulik, who finds her joy in the life of her idol Sophia Loren, and was released on Netflix on January 15, 2021.

== Plot ==
Nancy Kulik, a mother and grandmother, finds her strength and joy through the work of her idol, actress Sophia Loren. Loren, Edoardo Ponti, and Regina K. Scully also appear in the film.

== Production ==
Regina K. Scully wanted to make a film about her mother's love of Sophia Loren and her family after discussing the idea with Ross Kauffman, who agreed to direct the project. The film had begun production prior to Scully serving as a producer on The Life Ahead (which also starred Loren), which granted her the opportunity to arrange a meeting between her mother and Loren.

== Release ==
The film was released on January 15, 2021, on Netflix.
