= Walk Run Cha-Cha =

2019 short documentary film by Laura Nix

- Directed by: Laura Nix
- Written by: Laura Nix
- Starring: Chipaul Cao; Millie Cao; Maksym Kapitanchuk; Elena Krifuks
- Distributed by: The New York Times
- Release date: 2019
- Country: United States

Walk Run Cha-Cha is a 2019 American documentary short film directed by Laura Nix of The New York Times, which distributed the film.

== Plot ==
The film follows middle-aged Vietnamese couple Paul and Millie Cao preparing for ballroom dancing in suburban Los Angeles 40 years after their separation due to the Vietnam War.

== Accolades ==
- Nomination – 2020: Academy Award for Best Documentary (Short Subject)

== See also ==
- Counterculture of the 1960s
- Strictly Ballroom
