= Farnoosh Torabi =

American financial correspondent

- Born: February 15, 1980 (age 46); Worcester, Massachusetts, U.S.
- Education: Finance, international business, journalism
- Alma mater: Pennsylvania State University; Columbia University
- Occupations: Journalist, financial expert, television personality and author
- Website: farnoosh.tv

Farnoosh Torabi (born February 15, 1980) is an American personal finance expert, journalist, author, and television personality.

== Education and personal life ==
Torabi was born to Iranian parents in Worcester, Massachusetts, and attended Harriton High School in suburban Philadelphia. She has a Bachelors of Science in finance and international business from Pennsylvania State University and a MS in journalism from Columbia University. In 2010, she was named an alumna of distinction by Penn State University for graduates under the age of 35.

On June 16, 2012, she married Tim Dussinger in Philadelphia. They have a son, Evan Kiani, who was born on June 21, 2014.

== Career ==
Torabi began her career in 2003 as a researcher and reporter at Money magazine. From 2004 to 2006 she lived in New York City and worked as a business producer and reporter at NY1 News. She later became a financial correspondent for Jim Cramer's TheStreet TV from 2006 to 2009 where she covered the stock market, the economy, small business and personal finance.

In 2008, she was the financial correspondent on Real Simple Real Life. In 2009, she became the host of SOAPnet's The Bank of Mom and Dad, an adaptation of the BBC reality series. The New York Times called her advice on that show "perfectly practical". That year Torabi also published You're So Money: Live Rich Even When You're Not. The book focuses on financial advice for young people. Her next book, Psych Yourself Rich was published in 2010 by FT Press.

In 2010, Torabi joined Yahoo! Finance to host a weekly video series entitled Financially Fit. The series ended in December 2013.

In 2014, Torabi published her third book, When She Makes More: 10 Rules for Breadwinning Women. In it, she candidly addresses how income imbalances affect relationships and family dynamics, and presents a bold strategy to achieving happiness at work and home.

On January 14, 2015, Torabi launched the award-winning podcast, So Money. The podcast has been recognized by Inc. magazine as a "Top Podcast to Grow Your Business".

Torabi currently hosts the CNBC primetime series Follow The Leader, where she spends 72 hours embedded in the life of an entrepreneur to learn how that businessperson ticks. The first season premiered on April 6, 2016.

In April 2016 it was announced that Torabi would become the new financial columnist for O, The Oprah Magazine, where she contributes a monthly column.

Torabi's work and advice has been featured in The New York Times, The Wall Street Journal, Fortune, Forbes, Time, Marie Claire, Glamour, Redbook and USA Today. She has appeared on major news and talk shows, including The Today Show, CNN, MSNBC, Good Morning America, The View and Live! with Kelly and Michael.
