= Artemis Rising Foundation =

Nonprofit organization and film production and television production company

- Industry: Film industry
- Founder: Regina K. Scully
- Website: artemisrising.org

Artemis Rising Foundation is a nonprofit organization and film production and television production company, founded by Regina K. Scully.

The company has produced films including The Invisible War (2012), The Hunting Ground (2015), The Breadwinner (2017), Won't You Be My Neighbor? (2018), Knock Down the House (2019), The Truffle Hunters (2020), On the Record (2020), Ailey (2021) and Bring Your Own Brigade (2021).

== History ==
The organization was founded by Regina K. Scully to produce documentary and narrative film and television projects focusing on social justice issues.

The company has produced acclaimed films which have gone onto receive Academy Award and Primetime Emmy award wins and nominations including The Invisible War, by Kirby Dick, The Square directed by Jehane Noujaim, Brave Miss World by Cecilia Peck, The Hunting Ground (2015), The Tale (2018) by Jennifer Fox, and The Great Hack (2019), directed by Jehane Noujaim and Karim Amer.

The company has also produced the television series College Behind Bars for PBS, 16 and Recovering for MTV, The Vow and Allen v. Farrow for HBO.

== Filmography ==
Release date	Title	Directors	Role	Refs
2013	Alice Walker: Beauty in Truth	Pratibha Parmar		
2013	Brave Miss World	Cecilia Peck		
2014	Private Violence	Cynthia Hill		
2015	Thank You for Your Service	Tom Donahue		
2015	The Mask You Live In	Jennifer Siebel Newsom		
2015	The Many Sad Fates of Mr. Toledano	Joshua Seftel		
2015	Prophet's Prey	Amy J. Berg		
2015	CodeGirl	Lesley Chilcott		
2016	Dying in Vein, the opiate generation	Jenny Mackenzie		
2017	Step	Amanda Lipitz		
2017	Dolores	Peter Bratt		
2018	I Am Evidence	Trish Adlesic; Geeta Gandbhir		
2018	Be Natural: The Untold Story of Alice Guy-Blaché	Pamela B. Green		
2018	The Tale	Jennifer Fox		
2018	Generation Wealth	Lauren Greenfield		
2018	What Haunts Us	Paige Goldberg Tolmach		
2018	Roll Red Roll	Nancy Schwartzman		
2019	Oliver Sacks: His Own Life	Ric Burns		
2019	Not Carol	Eamon Harrington; John Watkin		
2019	The Kingmaker	Lauren Greenfield		
2019	Ruth: Justice Ginsburg in Her Own Words	Freida Lee Mock		
2019	Knock Down the House	Rachel Lears		
2019	Shooting the Mafia	Kim Longinotto		
2020	Aggie	Catherine Gund		
2020	The Art of Political Murder	Paul M. Taylor		
2020	The Life Ahead	Edoardo Ponti		
2020	A Crime on the Bayou	Nancy Buirski		
2020	Love & Stuff	Judith Helfand; David Cohen		
2020	Feels Good Man	Arthur Jones		
2020	Us Kids	Kim A. Snyder		
2020	The Truffle Hunters	Michael Dweck; Gregory Kershaw		
2020	On the Record	Kirby Dick; Amy Ziering		
2020	Gunda	Viktor Kosakovskiy		
2020	Jacinta	Jessica Earnshaw		
2020	Athlete A	Bonni Cohen; Jon Shenk		
2024	Familiar Touch	Sarah Friedland		
2024	Lilly	Rachel Feldman		
2024	Viva Verdi!	Yvonne Russo		
2025	The Librarians	Kim A. Snyder		
2025	Folktales	Heidi Ewing; Rachel Grady		
2025	All the Empty Rooms	Joshua Seftel		
2026	Cookie Queens	Alysa Nahmias		
2026	Top of the World	Julie Cohen; Betsy West		
