= Amanda Jones (librarian) =

American librarian and activist

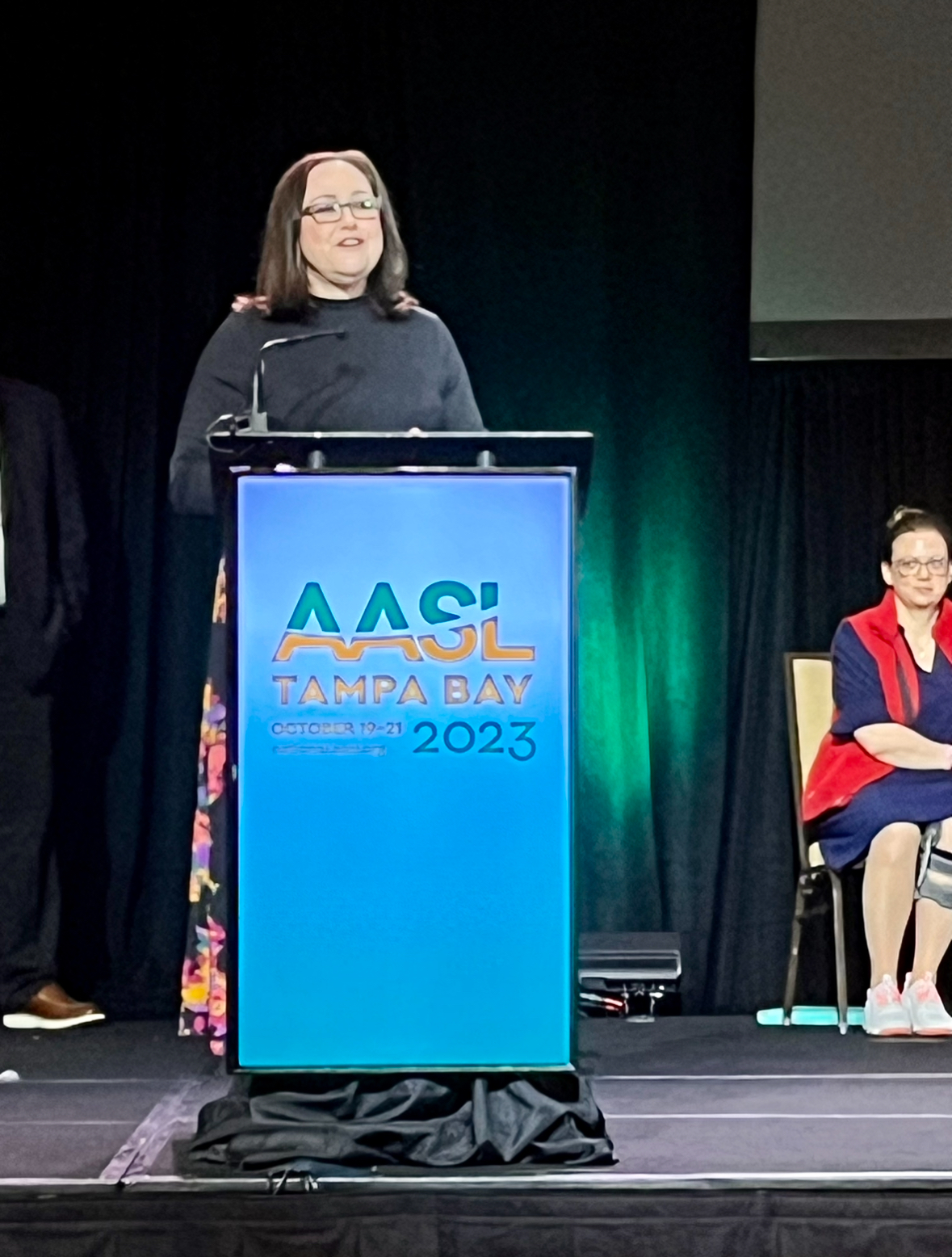
- Amanda Jones accepting the AASL Intellectual Freedom award in 2023
- Occupation: Librarian
- Awards: School Librarian of the Year

Amanda Jones is an American librarian and anti-censorship advocate. Jones has been heavily involved in anti-book-banning movements in the state of Louisiana and throughout the US. In 2023, she was awarded the American Association of School Librarians' Intellectual Freedom Award and the American Library Association's Paul Howard Award for Courage, which honors "an individual who has exhibited unusual courage for the benefit of library programs or services." In 2022, Jones received national news coverage after filing a defamation and harassment lawsuit against a conservative political group, Citizens for a New Louisiana, its leader Michael Lunsford, as well as Ryan Thames, who operates the Facebook page "Bayou State of Mind".

== Biography ==
Amanda Jones served as an educator in Louisiana for over twenty years. Jones had long been a vocal opponent of book censorship, arguing that book challenges have disproportionally targeted books with LGBTQ or BIPOC themes, characters, or authors.

In July 2022, Jones spoke publicly against book censorship at a Livingston Parish Public Library Board meeting. After the meeting, multiple conservative organizations posted about Jones on their websites and social media pages. The Facebook page Bayou State of Mind posted an image of Jones which stated that she was "advocating teaching anal sex to 11-year-olds." Citizens for a New Louisiana posted an image of Jones with a red circle with a white border, resembling a target, with text reading "Why is she fighting so hard to keep sexually erotic and pornographic materials in the kid's section?" Following this, Jones began receiving harassing communications, had personal information posted on the internet, and even received death threats. In describing the case, The New York Times referred to Citizens for a New Louisiana as a 501(c)4 dark money group that can push political causes without disclosing its donors.

In response to the harassment, Jones filed a defamation lawsuit, requesting punitive damages and a temporary restraining order. In September 2022, a judge dismissed Jones' case because she was a "limited public figure," and the posts against her were opinions and, therefore, not defamatory.

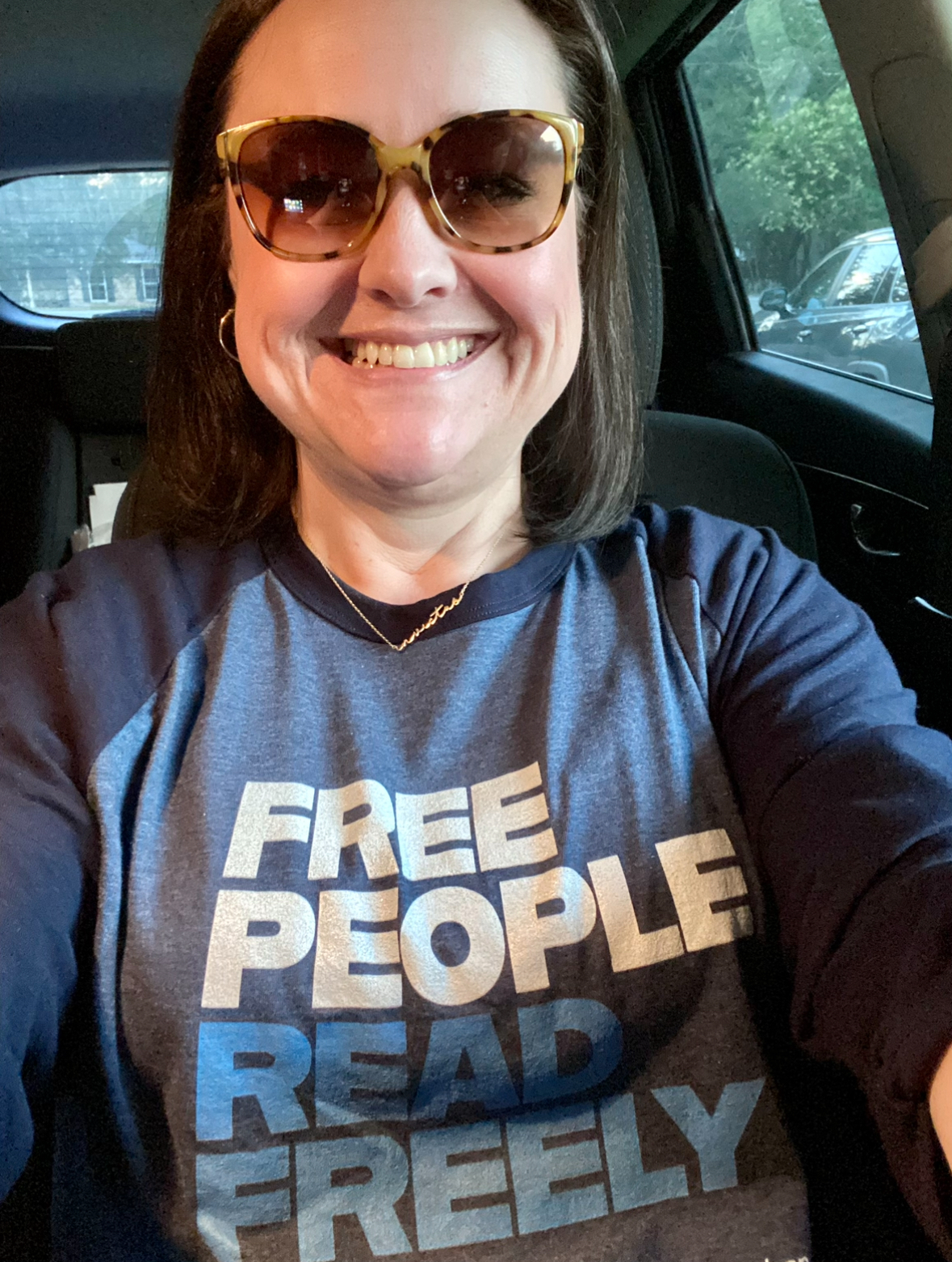
Amanda Jones, wearing an anti-censorship t-shirt from the American Library Association

Despite losing the lawsuit, Jones gained support and recognition as one of the first librarians to seek legal recourse against book-banning advocates. Following the case's publicity, Jones became a spokesperson for the anti-censorship movement, speaking across the United States on book censorship and intellectual freedom and publishing a book on the topic.

In 2022, Jones co-founded Louisiana Citizens Against Censorship with Lynette Mejia and Melanie Brevis. Jones also founded the Livingston Parish Library Alliance, where she serves as executive director. She has actively campaigned against censorship legislation in Louisiana, focusing on Senate Bill 7, introduced by Senator Heather Cloud in 2023, which aimed to restrict minors' access to material depicting "sexual conduct." Governor John Bel Edwards signed SB 7 into law in June 2023. In 2024, Jones lobbied against House Bill 414, introduced by Representative Josh Carlson, and House Bill 545, introduced by Representative Beryl Amedee, which would apply state obscenity law to public and school libraries, respectively. Both of these bills died in committee.

== Awards and recognition ==
In 2021, Jones was recognized by School Library Journal as School Librarian of the Year and made Library Journal's Movers and Shakers list.

In 2023, Jones received numerous intellectual freedom awards, including the American Association of School Librarians' Intellectual Freedom Award and the Louisiana Library Association's Alex Allain Intellectual Freedom Award. During the 2023 National Book Awards Ceremony, Oprah Winfrey praised Jones for her work, stating, "Amanda Jones started getting death threats, all for standing up for our right to read ... but she's not stopped fighting against book bans, or stopped advocating for access to diverse stories."

== Film ==
Year	Title	Role
2025	The Librarians	Self

== Published works ==
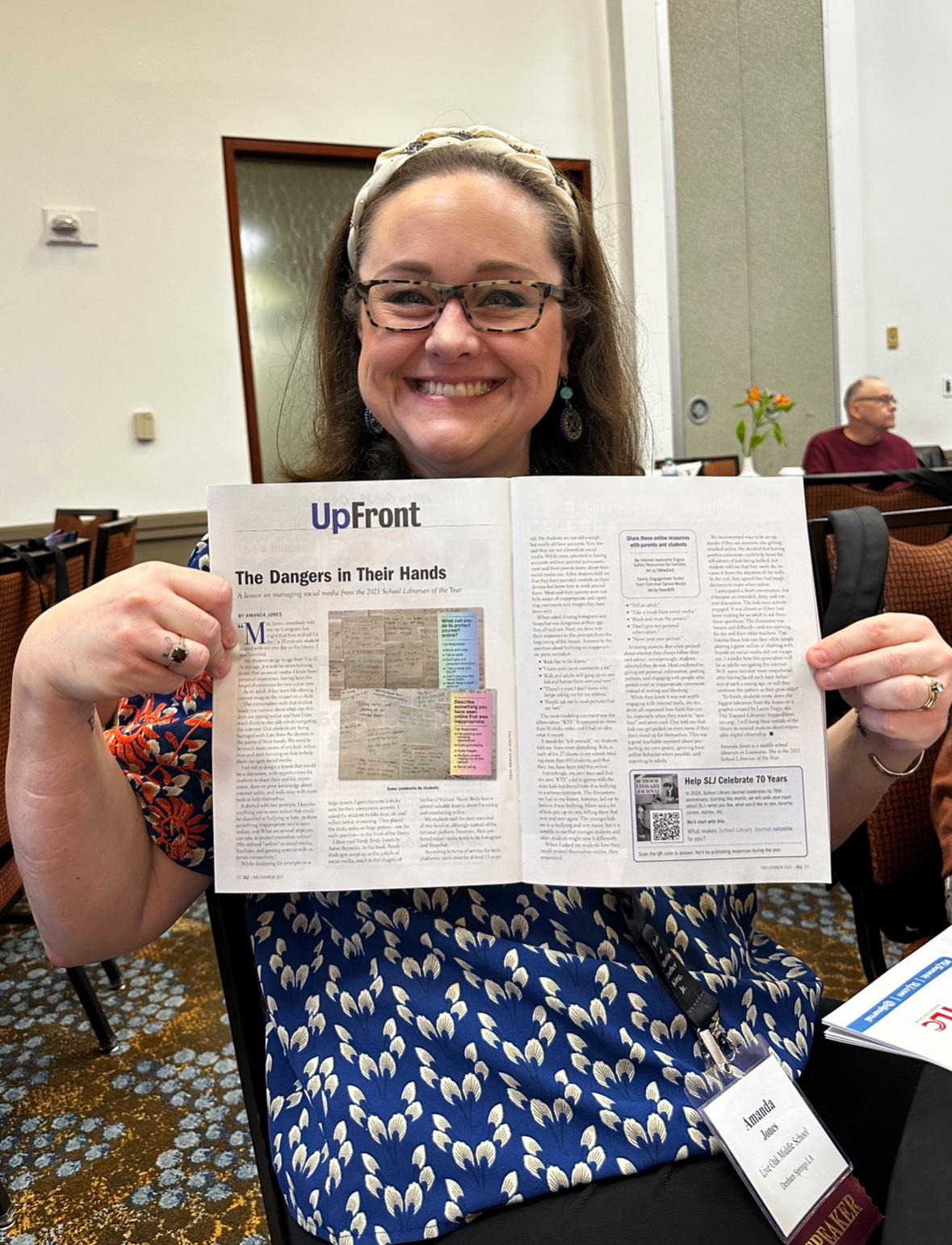
Jones showing her article on cyberbullying at the School Library Journal Summit, December 2023

- That Librarian: The Fight Against Book Banning in America. Bloomsbury Publishing. August 27, 2024. ISBN 978-1-63973-353-8.
- "2021 School Librarian of the Year Amanda Jones Creates Lesson About Navigating Social Media" in School Library Journal, January 2, 2024.
- "You're Gonna Hear Me Roar: Speaking out against Censorship Efforts in My Community." Knowledge Quest 51, no. 2 (2022): 18-23.

== See also ==
- Book censorship in the United States
