= Kim A. Snyder =

American filmmaker and producer

- Education: B.A., George Washington University (1983); M.A., Johns Hopkins SAIS (1986)
- Occupations: Filmmaker; producer; director; writer
- Known for: Newtown; The Librarians (2025 film); Death by Numbers; Peabody Award-winning documentary work

Kim A. Snyder is an American Oscar-nominated, Emmy and Peabody award-winning filmmaker and producer.

Snyder's latest film The Librarians (2025) was released in theaters and has garnered over 30 festival awards and had its US TV Broadcast on PBS's Independent Lens in early 2026. Her short documentary Death by Numbers was nominated for a 2025 Academy Award. She made her directorial debut with the 2000 documentary, I Remember Me. In 2016, Snyder won at the Crested Butte Film Festival ACTNow award for Newtown and was nominated at Sundance Film Festival in Grand Jury Prize-Documentary.

She currently resides in New York City.

== Background ==
Snyder received a bachelor's from George Washington University in 1983 and a master's in international affairs from the Johns Hopkins School of Advanced International Studies in 1986. Upon completion of her masters, Snyder worked in international trade. She became involved in filmmaking as an international film consultant and U.S. Producer's representative in Europe in the early 1990s.

She is an advocate for the use of film as a medium to promote social change. As a co-founder of the BeCause Foundation, which aims to better the lives of children, Snyder produced three short films—Alone No Love, One Bridge to the Next and Crossing Midnight—to raise awareness on issues of child sexual abuse, healthcare, homelessness and refugee integration. Previously, Snyder also served on the admissions committee for the Graduate Film Program at NYU's Tisch School of the Arts.

== Early career ==
Snyder credits curiosity for her start in filmmaking. Following some time representing films in Eastern Europe, she broke the production side of the indie film industry.

Snyder worked as an associate producer for the 1994 Oscar-winning short film Trevor, which tells the story of suicidal gay teenager. Trevor. It was later picked up by HBO, and Ellen DeGeneres hosted the airing. The directors of the film, Randy Stone and Peggy Rajski, realized the need for young people to have a safe way to discuss their feelings about sexuality, and thus in 1998 created the Trevor Lifeline (now the Trevor Project). The Trevor Lifeline became "the first national crisis intervention and suicide prevention lifeline for lesbian, gay, bisexual, transgender and questioning youth." Trevor won the 1995 Academy Award for Best Action Live Short.

In 2000, Snyder directed, produced, wrote and appeared in the film I Remember Me. The film became her biographical documentary debut, and explored the history of and controversy behind Chronic Fatigue Syndrome, which she had been diagnosed with.

=== Shorts ===
In 2008, Snyder expanded on her philanthropic efforts by working with the non-profit BeCause Foundation to direct and produce the short films Alone No Love, One Bridge to the Next and Crossing Midnight.

Alone No Love (2007) is a 27-minute film that addresses the issues Chicago doctors, state's attorneys, police officers and social workers face when working on cases involving sexually abuse children.

With a portion of America's homeless out of sight and out of mind for some, Snyder took the initiative to create her short One Bridge to the Next (2008). Most of the film narrows in on Operation Safety Net, an organization that delivers healthcare to the homeless from bridge ways to alleyways.

The last in the series of shorts Snyder directed and produced for the BeCause Foundation was Crossing Midnight (2009), which documents the struggles of Burma's refugees and those who come to their rescue.

Snyder directed and produced the short film Duke Riley Goes to China, which premiered at the Palm Springs International ShortFest in 2015. The film chronicles the journey of Brooklyn artist Duke Riley, who embarks on recreating the race of the 12 Chinese zodiac animals.

In fall of 2024, Kim A. Snyder's following short documentary Death by Numbers premiered at the Hamptons International Film Festival. Death by Numbers turns an intimate lens on school shooting survivor Sam Fuentes's journey to reclaim her power, processing trauma through journaling. To prepare for a confrontation with her assailant in his harrowing sentencing trial, she examines complex questions of collective hatred and justice. The film has been nominated for the Best Documentary Short Film at the 97th Academy Awards.

== Career ==
=== Welcome to Shelbyville ===
Welcome to Shelbyville (2011), another project done in cooperation with the BeCause Foundation, was selected as Gucci-Tribeca Documentary Fund grant recipient. It aired on PBS' Independent Lens. Snyder's Welcome to Shelbyville documents the intersection of race and religion in America's Heartland.

=== Newtown ===
Showing the people and lives most affected by the Sandy Hook Elementary School shooting in 2012, Snyder's Newtown made its debut in the US Documentary Competition at the 2016 Sundance Film Festival. Filmed over three years, the film focuses on the devastated community of Newtown, Connecticut in the aftermath of tragedy.

On the film, IndieWire blogger Katie Walsh wrote: "This film is an important historical record, and an important reminder of an event in American history that could have changed everything, that should have changed everything. There's no reason why it still can't. "Newtown" is a crucial reminder of that."

Jordan Raup of The Film Stage commented: "Each conversation, whether it be with families of those who lost children or the first responders at Sandy Hook Elementary School, is attuned to their internal grappling with the unfathomable loss.

Newtown won a Peabody Award, was nominated for the Sundance Grand July Prize in Documentary and for Best Documentary at the Cleveland International Film Festival.

=== Lessons from a School Shooting: Notes from Dunblane ===
Following the Newtown documentary, Snyder set out to direct a follow-up piece: Lessons from a School Shooting: Notes from Dunblane, which premiered at the 2018 Tribeca Film Festival.

=== The Librarians ===
In this 2025 documentary film which was directed and produced by Snyder, recent conflicts between local school boards and school librarians in Texas, Florida, and other states, are presented through interviews conducted with officials and numerous librarians — who in some cases have been fired from their positions — in order to provide insight into current-day book banning in the United States. Along with archival footage of book burnings in Nazi Germany and the dystopian film Fahrenheit 451, the documentary makes reference to the current role of Moms for Liberty in the concerted action to ban books in school libraries as well as the counter-protests by librarians, parents and students.

The film had its world premiere at the 2025 Sundance Film Festival on January 24, 2025. The film was theatrically released in the United States on October 3, 2025, by 8 Above. In September 2025 Snyder was present for screenings and discussions in the UK and Switzerland. It had its broadcast premiere on PBS's Independent Lens on February 9, 2026. In September 2026, the film won the Primetime Emmy Award for Exceptional Merit in Documentary Filmmaking at the 78th Primetime Creative Arts Emmy Awards.

== Nominations and awards ==
=== Nominations ===
- Academy Award, Best Documentary Short, Death by Numbers (2024)
- Cleveland International Film Festival, Best Documentary, Newtown (2016)
- Sundance Film Festival, Grand Jury Prize-Documentary, Newtown (2016)
- Critics Choice Award, Best Political Documentary, Newtown (2016)

=== Awards ===
- Primetime Emmy Award for Exceptional Merit in Documentary Filmmaking, The Librarians (2025 film) (2026)
- DOC NYC, SHORT DOCUMENTARY - SPECIAL MENTION, Death by Numbers (2024)
- Montclair Film Festival, Best Documentary Short, Death by Numbers (2024)
- Tribeca Film Festival, Best Documentary Short, Lessons from a School Shooting: Notes from Dunblane (2018)
- Peabody Award, Best Documentary, Newtown (2017)
- Crested Butte Film Festival, ACTNow Award, Newtown (2016)
- Denver Film Festival, Best Documentary Film/Video, I Remember Me (2000)
- Hamptons Film Festival, Honorable Mention, I Remember Me
- Sarasota Film Festival, First Runner Up, I Remember Me
- Taos Film Festival, Land Grant Finalist
- Aspen Shortsfest, Audience Award, One Bridge to the Next (2008)

== Filmography ==
=== Director ===
- I Remember Me (2000)
- Alone No Love (2007)
- One Bridge to the Next (2008)
- Crossing Midnight (2009)
- Independent Lens (2011)
- Welcome to Shelbyville (2011)
- Duke Riley Goes to China (2015)
- Newtown (2016)
- Lessons from a School Shooting: Notes from Dunblane (2018)
- Us Kids (2020)
- Death by Numbers (2024)
- The Librarians (2025)

=== Producer ===
- Trevor (1994)
- I Remember Me (2000)
- Alone No Love (2007)
- One Bridge to the Next (2008)
- Crossing Midnight (2009)
- Independent Lens (2011)
- Welcome to Shelbyville (2011)
- Duke Riley Goes to China (2015)
- Newtown (2016)
- Lessons from a School Shooting: Notes from Dunblane (2018)
- Us Kids (2020)
- Death by Numbers (2024)
- The Librarians (2025)
