= Campus Apartments =

American student housing company

Campus Apartments is a student housing company headquartered in Philadelphia, United States. The CEO is David J. Adelman. The company was founded in 1958 by Alan Horwitz, a friend of the Adelman family.

Campus Apartments originally served the students of the University of Pennsylvania. The company now provides student housing in 25 states, and holds over 145 properties. It is the largest privately held student housing company based in the United States.

Campus Apartments is also doing many development deals, with $250M announced in 2016.
