= David Sheffield Bell =

American physician

- Education: Harvard University; Boston University
- Occupation: Physician

David Sheffield Bell is an American physician who has done extensive research on the clinical aspects of myalgic encephalomyelitis/chronic fatigue syndrome (ME/CFS). He has also conducted evaluations and research in pediatric ME/CFS and written numerous articles about the condition.

Bell is retired from a private practice in general medicine in the town of Lyndonville, New York which he had started in 1979. Bell also served as Clinical Associate Professor of Pediatrics at the State University of New York at Buffalo, in Buffalo, New York.

== Training ==
Bell is a graduate of Harvard University, class of 1967, with an AB degree in English Literature. He graduated in 1971 from Boston University with an MD degree, and in 1976 completed post-doctoral training in pediatrics including Pediatric Behavior and Developmental Disorders.

== Work on ME/CFS ==
Bell's interest in ME/CFS began in 1985 when an apparent cluster outbreak of 216 persons occurred in his rural community in upstate New York. He has written extensively on the condition, including a thirteen-year follow-up study of the children who became ill during the original outbreak.

Bell was involved in identifying the outbreak in Lyndonville, New York, of what was known at the time as chronic Epstein-Barr virus (now more commonly referred to as ME/CFS). When Bell was interviewed about the outbreak in a 1996 Prime Time Live episode, the reporter described Bell's appeal to the Centers for Disease Control and Prevention (CDC) for help with the illness, but Bell says the CDC didn't mention a similar outbreak in Lake Tahoe, which he learned about later. He met with other ME/CFS researchers at a 1987 conference, and joined an investigation with researchers Paul Cheney and Elaine DeFreitas involving a possible retrovirus association with chronic fatigue syndrome. In 1990, the researchers presented evidence they found DNA sequences very similar to a known human retrovirus in some ME/CFS patients, at a conference in Kyoto, Japan. Their study was later published in the Proceedings of the National Academy of Sciences. A reporter on Prime Time Live stated the announcement made headlines all over the world. The CDC first ignored their findings, then later conducted a study and published a paper that refuted the hypothesis.

Bell wrote The Doctor's Guide to Chronic Fatigue Syndrome, which was published in 1995. The book, which also refers to ME/CFS as "chronic fatigue/immune dysfunction syndrome," or CFIDS, describes Bell's CFIDS disability scale. Various publications have used or proposed Bell's scale which is similar to the Karnofsky scale, for the documentation of severity of symptoms in chronic fatigue syndrome.

In the 2000 ME/CFS documentary, I Remember Me, Bell appeared in an interview recounting his experiences during the Lyndonville outbreak.

In 2003, Secretary of Health and Human Services Tommy Thompson designated Bell chairperson of the Chronic Fatigue Syndrome Advisory Committee (CFSAC), a panel of 11 experts that provides advice and recommendations to the Secretary of Health and Human Services "on the development and implementation of programs to inform the public; health care professionals; and the biomedical, academic, and research communities about advances related to CFS."

Bell also served as a board member of the International Association for Chronic Fatigue Syndrome/ME (IACFS/ME), a professional organization of about 300 members that advocates for the concerns of CFS researchers and clinicians around the world.

Bell has retired from private practice, but in 2011 was still doing research on the cause of the illness of ME/CFS patients in Lyndonville NY.

Bell currently serves on the Open Medicine Foundation Scientific Advisory Board, which is committed to ending ME/CFS.
