= The Librarians (2025 film) =

2025 American documentary film

- Theatrical release poster
- Directed by: Kim A. Snyder
- Produced by: Kim A. Snyder; Janique L. Robillard; Maria Cuomo Cole; Jana Edelbaum
- Cinematography: Paulius Knotijevas; Amy Bench; Derek Wiesehahn
- Edited by: María Gabriela Torres; Leah Boatright; Austin Reedy
- Music by: Nico Muhly
- Production companies: K.A. Snyder Productions; Cuomo Cole Productions; ITVS; Ideal Partners; World of HA Productions; Artemis Rising Foundation; Pretty Matches Productions
- Distributed by: 8 Above
- Release dates: January 24, 2025 (Sundance); October 3, 2025
- Running time: 92 minutes
- Country: United States
- Language: English
- Box office: $333,291

The Librarians is a 2025 American documentary film, directed and produced by Kim A. Snyder. It follows librarians in Texas, Florida, and other states, as they unite to combat book banning in the United States. Sarah Jessica Parker serves as an executive producer under her Pretty Matches Productions banner.

The film had its world premiere at the Sundance Film Festival on January 24, 2025, and was released on October 3, 2025, by 8 Above.

== Premise ==
The documentary follows librarians including Carolyn Foote, Suzette Baker, and Amanda Jones in Texas, Louisiana, Florida, and other states, as they unite to combat book banning from Moms for Liberty and other groups in the United States.

== Production ==
Moms for Liberty denied requests to be interviewed for the film. ITVS co-produced the film, with Independent Lens retaining broadcast rights.

== Release ==
The Librarians had its world premiere at the Sundance Film Festival on January 24, 2025 and a screening on March 7, 2025 at the South by Southwest film festival.

In September 2025, it was screened and discussed in Oxford, England, and at the Zurich Film Festival in Switzerland in the festival section Hashtag #SaveDemocracy.

The film was released in the United States on October 3, 2025, by 8 Above. It will be screened in the non-competitive 'Freestyle – Arts' section of the 20th Rome Film Festival in October 2025.

It was broadcast by BBC Four in the UK on 7 October 2025 as part of the Storyville series and is available in some regions on BBC iPlayer.

In October 2025, the film was screened at the 49th edition of the São Paulo International Film Festival, Brazil, as part of the event's 'International Perspective' session.

PBS broadcast the documentary as part of Independent Lens on February 9, 2026.

== Reception ==
On the review aggregator website Rotten Tomatoes, 95% of 38 critics' reviews are positive. The website's consensus reads: "The Librarians delivers an illuminating and alarming look at coordinated book bans in America, transforming a hard but necessary watch into a cautionary tale and a stirring call to action." On Metacritic, the film has a weighted average score of 83 out of 100 based on 9 critics, which the site labels as "universal acclaim".

== Accolades ==
Award	Year	Category	Nominee(s)	Result	Ref.
Cinéfest Sudbury International Film Festival	2025	Audience Choice, Documentary	Kim A. Snyder	Runner-up	
Primetime Emmy Awards	2026	Exceptional Merit in Documentary Filmmaking	Kim A. Snyder, Janique L. Robillard, Maria Cuomo Cole, Jana Edelbaum, and Lois Vossen	Won	
