= Delta Private Jets =

American charter airline, subsidiary of Delta Air Lines

IATA	ICAO	Call sign
—	DPJ	JET CARD
- Founded: 1984; 42 years ago (as Comair Jet Express)
- Ceased operations: January 31, 2020; 6 years ago (merged with Wheels Up)
- Hubs: Cincinnati
- Frequent-flyer program: SkyMiles
- Alliance: SkyTeam (affiliate)
- Fleet size: 70
- Parent company: Delta Air Lines
- Headquarters: Cincinnati/Northern Kentucky International Airport; Boone County, Kentucky, U.S.
- Key people: Rex Bevis, President & CFO; Lee Gossett, COO
- Website: www.deltaprivatejets.com See Archived 1 January 2020 at the Wayback Machine.

Delta Private Jets, Inc. was an airline of the United States. Its corporate headquarters was on the property of Cincinnati/Northern Kentucky International Airport in Boone County, Kentucky. It operated business jet aircraft as a subsidiary of Delta Air Lines. Its main base was Cincinnati/Northern Kentucky International Airport.

== History ==
The airline was founded as Comair Jet Express in 1984. It was renamed in October 2001 by the parent company Delta Air Lines. Delta Air Lines wholly own it.

On September 14, 2005, parent company Delta Air Lines filed for bankruptcy, citing rising fuel costs. It emerged from bankruptcy in April 2007 after fending off a hostile takeover from US Airways and its shares were re-listed on the New York Stock Exchange.

Delta Private Jets is a private aviation service aimed at businesses needs to destinations on a private aircraft or that the airport does not supply regularly. Delta Private Jets is also available to SkyMiles Elite members for an upgrade purchase price of $300–800 on select routes from Delta's Cincinnati, Atlanta, and New York hubs. This service also allows travellers to avoid flying hassles such as security.

Delta Private Jets headquarters is located at 82 Comair Boulevard building, which used to be the Comair headquarters and was called the Comair General Office Building.

In June 2017, David Sneed, who had overseen several changes, including accepting SkyMiles as payments for jet cards, left Delta Private Jets, where he was the senior executive. In July 2017, former Virgin Australia COO Gary Hammes was named its new president. In October 2018, Hammes was succeeded by Jeff Mihalic, who was appointed CEO of the company. Mihalic is the former President of Delta Material Services. At the same time, long-time Delta employee Lee Gossett was named Senior Vice President of Operations and COO. Before his appointment, Gossett was the Vice President of line maintenance at Delta Air Lines.

In January 2017, Delta Private Jets announced Sky Access, a new membership program. Members can book as many empty-leg flights as they wish for free for an initiation fee of $8,500 and a $6,000 renewal. Members get the entire aircraft. DPJ said they flew over 6,300 empty legs in 2017.

In November 2018, DPJ announced the expansion of its maintenance, repair, and overhaul (MRO) capabilities by opening a new location at Sheltair Aviation on the grounds of the Ft. Lauderdale-Hollywood International Airport (FLL) in Florida.

On December 9, 2019, Delta Air Lines announced it took a stake in Wheels Up, a US air charter operator founded in 2013 and operating 120 aircraft (King Air 350i twin turboprops, Citation Excels/XLSs, Citation Xs and Hawker 400XP business jets) for its 7,700 members, to become its largest investor and merge it in the first quarter of 2020 with its Delta Private Jets subsidiary, to operate a fleet of 190 business aircraft.

== Benefits ==
Delta Private Jet card holders receive SkyMiles Diamond Medallion tier status. They also receive regular commercial flight ticket discounts.

== Accidents and incidents ==
- On August 21, 2019, Delta Private Jets Flight 91, a Cessna Citation Excel, registration N91GY bound for Portland International Airport suffered a runway excursion after aborting takeoff at Oroville Municipal Airport in California. The aircraft wound up in the grass and a fire broke out. All 10 occupants (2 crew, 8 passengers) evacuated safely. The aircraft burned and was written off. The cause of the accident was the failure of the pilots to release the parking brake.
- On October 7, 2019, Delta Private Jets Flight 86, a Hawker 800, registration N86MN originating from Naples Airport bound for Kerrville Municipal Airport landed with the nosegear retracted at Southwest Florida International Airport. The 2 crew and 2 passengers were not injured. However, the aircraft was substantially damaged. The cause of the accident was improper installation by maintenance of the nose gear assembly.

== Fleet ==
The Delta Private Jets fleet includes the following aircraft (as of March 2020):

- 1 Bombardier Challenger 300
- 1 Bombardier Challenger 350
- 5 Bombardier Challenger 604
- 1 Bombardier Learjet 75
- 4 Bombardier Learjet 45
- 4 Bombardier Learjet 60
- 7 Cessna Citation X
- 21 Cessna Citation XLS/Excel
- 3 Cessna Citation CJ2
- 6 Cessna Citation CJ3
- 1 Cessna Citation Ultra/Bravo
- 4 Cessna Citation Sovereign
- 1 Dassault Falcon 7X
- 1 Embraer Phenom 300
- 1 Gulfstream GV
- 2 Gulfstream GIV
- 3 Gulfstream G200
- 1 Gulfstream G150
- 1 Hawker 4000
- 1 Hawker 800XP
- 1 Nextant 400XT
