= Form 8-K =

U.S. Securities and Exchange Commission form

Form 8-K is a very broad form used to notify investors in United States public companies of specified events that may be important to shareholders or the United States Securities and Exchange Commission. This is one of the most common types of forms filed with the SEC. Publicly reporting companies generally have four business days to file Form 8-K after an event triggers the filing requirement, although a filing made solely to satisfy Regulation FD may be due sooner. Form 8-K is required to be filed by public companies with the SEC pursuant to the Securities Exchange Act of 1934, as amended.

Academic researchers make this report metadata available as structured datasets in the Harvard Dataverse.

== When Form 8-K is required ==
Form 8-K is used to notify investors of a current event. These types of events include:

- signing, amending or terminating material definitive agreements not made in the ordinary course of business, bankruptcies or receiverships
- mine shutdowns or violations of mine health and safety laws
- consummation of a material asset acquisition or sale
- results of operations and financial condition, creating certain financial obligations, such as incurrence of material debt
- triggering events that accelerate material obligations (such as defaults on a loan)
- costs associated with exit or disposal plans (layoffs, shutting down a plant, or material change in services or outlets)
- material impairments
- delisting from a securities exchange or failing to satisfy listing requirements
- unregistered equity sales (private placements)
- modifications to shareholder rights
- change in accountants
- determinations that previously issued financial statements cannot be relied upon
- change in control
- senior officer appointments and departures
- director elections and departures
- amendments to certificate/articles of incorporation or bylaws
- changes in fiscal year
- trading suspension under employee benefit plans
- amendments or waivers of code of ethics
- changes in shell company status
- results of shareholder votes
- disclosures applicable to issuers of asset-backed securities
- disclosures necessary to comply with Regulation FD
- other material events
- certain financial statements and other exhibits.

Investors should always read any 8-K filings that are made by companies in which they are invested. These reports are often material to the company, and frequently contain information that will affect the share price.

== Reading Form 8-K ==
Typically an 8-K filing will only have two major parts: the name and description of the event and any exhibits that are relevant. The name and description of the event contains all the information that the company considers relevant to shareholders and the SEC. It is important to read this information, as it has been deemed "material" by the company. Any exhibits that are relevant may include financial statements, press releases, data tables, or other information that is referenced in the description of the event.

== Form 8-K items ==
The 8-K items are defined in the following table.

Section 1	Registrant's Business and Operations
Item 1.01	Entry into a Material Definitive Agreement
Item 1.02	Termination of a Material Definitive Agreement
Item 1.03	Bankruptcy or Receivership
Item 1.04	Mine Safety - Reporting of Shutdowns and Patterns of Violations
Item 1.05	Cybersecurity Incidents
Section 2	Financial Information
Item 2.01	Completion of Acquisition or Disposition of Assets
Item 2.02	Results of Operations and Financial Condition
Item 2.03	Creation of a Direct Financial Obligation or an Obligation under an Off-Balance Sheet Arrangement of a Registrant
Item 2.04	Triggering Events That Accelerate or Increase a Direct Financial Obligation or an Obligation under an Off-Balance Sheet Arrangement
Item 2.05	Costs Associated with Exit or Disposal Activities
Item 2.06	Material Impairments
Section 3	Securities and Trading Markets
Item 3.01	Notice of Delisting or Failure to Satisfy a Continued Listing Rule or Standard; Transfer of Listing
Item 3.02	Unregistered Sales of Equity Securities
Item 3.03	Material Modification to Rights of Security Holders
Section 4	Matters Related to Accountants and Financial Statements
Item 4.01	Changes in Registrant's Certifying Accountant
Item 4.02	Non-Reliance on Previously Issued Financial Statements or a Related Audit Report or Completed Interim Review
Section 5	Corporate Governance and Management
Item 5.01	Changes in Control of Registrant
Item 5.02	Departure of Directors or Certain Officers; Election of Directors; Appointment of Certain Officers; Compensatory Arrangements of Certain Officers
Item 5.03	Amendments to Articles of Incorporation or Bylaws; Change in Fiscal Year
Item 5.04	Temporary Suspension of Trading Under Registrant's Employee Benefit Plans
Item 5.05	Amendment to Registrant's Code of Ethics, or Waiver of a Provision of the Code of Ethics
Item 5.06	Change in Shell Company Status
Item 5.07	Submission of Matters to a Vote of Security Holders
Item 5.08	Shareholder Director Nominations
Section 6	Asset-Backed Securities
Item 6.01	ABS Informational and Computational Material
Item 6.02	Change of Servicer or Trustee
Item 6.03	Change in Credit Enhancement or Other External Support
Item 6.04	Failure to Make a Required Distribution
Item 6.05	Securities Act Updating Disclosure
Section 7	Regulation FD
Item 7.01	Regulation FD Disclosure
Section 8	Other Events
Item 8.01	Other Events (The registrant can use this Item to report events that are not specifically called for by Form 8-K, that the registrant considers to be of importance to security holders.)
Section 9	Financial Statements and Exhibits
Item 9.01	Financial Statements and Exhibits

== Historical Form 8-K items ==
Prior to August 23, 2004, 8-K items were filed under different item numbers. Those historical items are displayed in the table below.

Item 1	Changes in Control of Registrant
Item 2	Acquisition or Disposition of Assets
Item 3	Bankruptcy or Receivership
Item 4	Changes in Registrant's Certifying Accountant
Item 5	Other Events
Item 6	Resignation of Registrant's Directors
Item 7	Financial Statements and Exhibits
Item 8	Change in Fiscal Year
Item 9	Regulation FD Disclosure
Item 10	Amendments to the Registrant's Code of Ethics
Item 11	Temporary Suspension of Trading Under Registrant's Employee Benefit Plans
Item 12	Results of Operations and Financial Condition
