= Us Kids =

2020 film

- Official poster
- Directed by: Kim A. Snyder
- Produced by: Kim A. Snyder; Maria Cuomo Cole; Lori Cheatle
- Cinematography: Derek Wiesehahn
- Edited by: Leigh Johnson
- Music by: Fil Eisler; Brian Reitzell
- Production companies: Impact Partners; K.A. Snyder Productions; Cuomo Cole Productions; Park Pictures; Artemis Rising Foundation; XTR; JustFilms/Ford Foundation
- Distributed by: Greenwich Entertainment
- Release dates: January 25, 2020 (Sundance); May 14, 2021 (United States)
- Running time: 98 minutes
- Country: United States
- Language: English

Us Kids is a 2020 American documentary film directed by Kim A. Snyder, following members of the March for Our Lives movement after the shooting at Marjory Stoneman Douglas High School on February 14, 2018.

The film had its world premiere at the 2020 Sundance Film Festival on January 25, 2020. It was scheduled for wider release on May 14, 2021, by Greenwich Entertainment.

== Synopsis ==
The film follows the March for Our Lives movement over the course of 18 months, in the aftermath of the Marjory Stoneman Douglas High School shooting that killed 17 people and injured 17 more. X González, David Hogg, Cameron Kasky, Jaclyn Corin, Bria Smith, Samantha Fuentes and Alex King appear in the film. Us Kids also captures how youth got involved with political activism, launching a global youth movement against gun violence.

== Release ==
The film had its world premiere at the 2020 Sundance Film Festival on January 25, 2020. The film was briefly released online for free from October 30, 2020, to November 3, 2020. In February 2021, Greenwich Entertainment acquired distribution rights to the film and initially set it for an April 9, 2021, release. It was postponed until May 14, 2021, for release in theaters and video on demand (VOD).

== Critical response ==
Us Kids received positive reviews from film critics. It holds an 84% approval rating on review aggregator website Rotten Tomatoes, based on 32 reviews, with an average of 6.6/10. The site's critical consensus reads, "Skillfully directed by Kim A. Snyder, Us Kids is a stirring portrait of hope that prevails in the face of tragedy." On Metacritic, the film holds a rating of 65 out of 100, based on nine9 critics, indicating "generally favorable reviews".

Critics praised Us Kids for handling a difficult and sensitive subject matter (U.S. gun violence) carefully and optimistically. Carlos Aguilar at the Los Angeles Times wrote, "Us Kids is indispensable viewing for anyone who genuinely cares about the future of this country beyond 'thoughts and prayers.'" Lovia Gyarkye at the New York Times wrote, "Us Kids skillfully handles a sensitive subject and prudently connects the Parkland students' stories to those of Black students whose experiences with gun violence rarely garner similar national attention."
