= Michael Silvestro =

American businessman

- Education: University of Notre Dame
- Occupation: CEO
- Employer: Flexjet
- Spouse: Mary Lynn Silvestro

Michael J. “Mike” Silvestro is the chief executive officer (CEO) of Directional Aviation's private fractional aviation travel businesses, which include Flexjet and Flight Options two of the world's three largest fractional jet companies.

== Early life and career ==
Silvestro (born 1958) grew up in Lyndhurst, Ohio, where he played football at Charles F. Brush High School, from which he graduated in 1976. Silvestro is an alumnus of the University of Notre Dame, where he earned a bachelor's degree in marketing.

At Notre Dame, he played football, and was only one of two non-scholarship players in his freshman class. He was coached by Daniel “Rudy” Ruettiger, the Notre Dame football player whose story inspired the movie Rudy. In 1979, Silvestro was on the Dan Devine-coached Notre Dame team that won the Cotton Bowl Classic 35–34 with a dramatic, last-second comeback led by quarterback Joe Montana.

After graduating from Notre Dame, Silvestro began his career at Owens Corning Fiberglass and then founded Spectrum Sports, a supplier of innersoles for athletic shoes. This launched a career in the footwear and sporting goods industries, where he spent 18 years. He founded several companies whose products ranged from high-technology polymer technology for athletic footwear to celebrity-endorsed, personal products. Silvestro also invented or co-invented products such as an advanced shin guard for protection in football and other contact sports that was patented in 1984.

== Aviation career ==
Silvestro began his aviation career at Flight Options in 2000, which his former Notre Dame roommate Kenn Ricci had founded in 1998. Silvestro served Flight Options as Vice President of Sales and Marketing from 2000 to 2005, helping to pioneer the company's approach of selling fractional shares in refurbished as well as new aircraft. During his tenure, he helped to build Flight Options into the industry's second-ranked company, with more than 200 aircraft and several thousand fractional and jet card customers.

Silvestro, who holds a private pilot's license, left Flight Options after Raytheon Travel Air's investment that ultimately led to its acquiring majority control of the company. Silvestro held a senior position with fractional provider CitationShares from 2005 to 2008.

Silvestro returned to Flight Options as CEO in 2008 after its acquisition by Directional Aviation, and helped to lead its recovery after the recession of 2008–09. Flight Options saw a 467 percent increase in fractional jet sales and a 46 percent increase in jet card sales during the first quarter of 2011, compared to the same period in the previous year, part of four consecutive years of improved financial results. In 2012, Flight Options saw sales increase 30 percent year over year, with a 70 percent increase in sales to owners who left a competing brand.

During 2009–12, Silvestro also helped modernize the Flight Options fleet with a mix of new and refurbished aircraft. In 2011, Flight Options received delivery of more business jets than any operator worldwide. These included such innovative planes as the Embraer Phenom 300 executive jet, making Flight Options the first fractional provider in the world to offer that aircraft. It also included the Nextant Aerospace 400XT, the world's first completely remanufactured business jet.

During a period in which financing was difficult to obtain, Silvestro also pioneered innovative approaches to funding aircraft purchases, contributing to the team that assembled the Banco Nacional de Desenvolvimento Econômico e Social (BNDES) financing for the Phenom 300, which was named Corporate Jet Investor Deal of the Year in 2012.

In 2013, Silvestro also became CEO of Flexjet after its acquisition from Bombardier Aerospace by private aviation company Directional Aviation. Silvestro also is a shareholder of the flying companies under Directional Aviation, whose principal is Kenn Ricci, the chairman of both Flight Options and Flexjet. Silvestro currently is the longest-serving CEO in the fractional jet industry.

At Flexjet, Silvestro managed a complete update and diversification of the company's fleet. Under Bombardier ownership, the fleet consisted solely of that company's aircraft; after the acquisition by Directional Aviation, Flexjet continued to purchase Bombardier Challenger, Learjet and Global Express aircraft but also placed orders with Gulfstream, Embraer and Aerion. Flexjet has placed firm orders with options with a total potential value of more than $8 billion.

Silvestro also launched other initiatives at Flexjet, including its Red Label premium offering, which has several features unique to the fractional market including flight crews dedicated to a single aircraft; custom cabin interiors; and the world's youngest fractional jet fleet. He also implemented Global Access, which offers access to large-cabin aircraft for long-distance travel, especially intercontinental trips. Flexjet also expanded international travel options, especially to Europe. Additionally, Flexjet began operating private terminals at select airports to increase customer appeal.

Under Silvestro, Flexjet experienced 20 percent growth in new business in 2016 compared to 2015, with 50 percent of the new business coming from customers who earlier had flown with another fractional private jet company. Moreover, business generated through referrals from existing Flexjet Owners grew 23 percent in 2016 versus 2015.

Silvestro has appeared on TV, radio and digital outlets including CNBC (both the Street Signs and Closing Bell programs), Wall Street Journal Digital Network, MarketWatch Radio, Fox Business Network and Bloomberg Television and has been quoted in such print media outlets as Barron's PENTA, The Financial Times and The Robb Report, and he also appears on local and industry media.

In 2023, Silvestro was honored with the Living Legends of Aviation Lifetime Aviation Industry Award, reflecting contributions to the field over an entire career.

== Personal life ==
Silvestro is married to Mary Lynn Silvestro, his wife whom he married in 1982. They have four children, two sons as well as two adopted children from Rwanda. Silvestro is a member of the Board of Trustees of Ursuline College and the Achievement Centers for Children.
