= Peixoto =

Peixoto (Portuguese pronunciation: [pejˈʃotu]) is a Portuguese surname. Notable people with the surname include:

- Alvarenga Peixoto (1743–1793), Brazilian poet, born in Rio de Janeiro
- António Augusto de Rocha Peixoto (1866–1909), naturalist, ethnologist and archaeologist
- Bruno Peixoto (born 1974), Brazilian politician
- César Peixoto (born 1980), Portuguese footballer who plays for Sport Lisboa e Benfica in the Portuguese first division
- Floriano Peixoto (1839–1895), Brazilian soldier and politician, a veteran of the Paraguayan War, second President of Brazil
- Floriano Peixoto (actor), known as Floriano Peixoto (born 1959), Brazilian film and television actor from Rio de Janeiro
- Floriano Peixoto Vieira Neto, (born 1954), Brazilian Army officer, commander of the United Nations Stabilization Mission in Haiti
- Guilherme Peixoto, known as Padre Guilherme (born 1974), Catholic priest, DJ, and EDM recording artist from Portugal
- Júlio Afrânio Peixoto (1876–1947), Brazilian physician, writer, politician, historian, university president, and eugenicist
- José Luís Peixoto (born 1974), Portuguese writer who has written fiction, poetry, drama and lyrics
- Kerwin Peixoto (born 1988), professional football defender from Peru
- Leonardo Henrique Peixoto dos Santos (born 1977), Brazilian football centre-back
- Mário Peixoto (1908–1992), mainly known for his only film Limite, a silent experimental movie filmed in 1930
- Maurício Peixoto (1921–2019), Brazilian engineer who pursued a career as a mathematician

== See also ==
- Embraer Unidade Gavião Peixoto Airport (IATA: N/A, ICAO: SBGP), a private airport near Gavião Peixoto, São Paulo, Brazil
- Floriano Peixoto, Rio Grande do Sul, municipality in the state Rio Grande do Sul, Brazil
- Gavião Peixoto, municipality in the state of São Paulo in Brazil
- Peixoto's theorem, relating to the properties of smooth flows on surfaces
- Peixoto de Azevedo, city located in the state of Mato Grosso, Brazil
- Peixoto de Azevedo River, river of Mato Grosso state in western Brazil
