= Embraer Legacy 450/500 and Praetor 500/600 =

Brazilian mid-size business jets

Legacy 450/Praetor 500 Legacy 500/Praetor 600
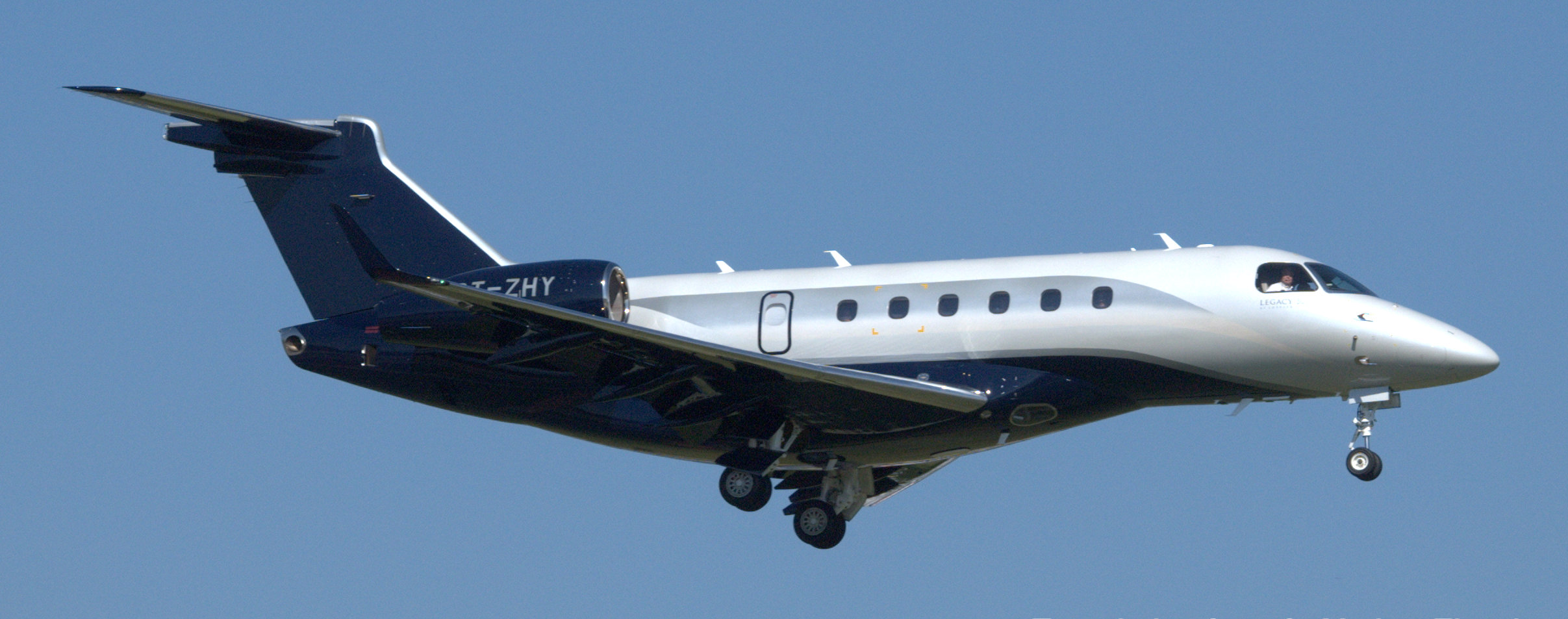
- Legacy 500 in flight, landing gear extended

General information
- Type: Business jet
- National origin: Brazil
- Manufacturer: Embraer
- Status: In Service
- Primary users: Flexjet AirSprint; NetJets
- Number built: 467 (as of Q3 2026); Praetor 500 : 156; Praetor 600 : 173; Legacy 500 : 80; Legacy 450 : 58

History
- Manufactured: 500 : 2011-present
- Introduction date: 500 : 11 October 2014
- First flight: 500 : 27 November 2012; 450 : 28 December 2013

The Embraer Legacy 450/500 and Praetor 500/600 are a family of mid-size and super mid-size business jets built by Brazilian aircraft manufacturer Embraer. The aircraft family was launched with the Legacy 500 in April 2008 and were the first jets in the size category to feature a flat-floor stand-up cabin and fly-by-wire.

The Legacy 500, with a range of 3,125 nautical miles [nmi] (5,790 km; 3,600 mi) and room for up to 12 passengers, first flew on November 27, 2012, and was certified on August 12, 2014. The shorter Legacy 450 first flew on December 28, 2013, was certified on August 11, 2015, has a range of 2,900 nmi (5,370 km; 3,340 mi), and can accommodate up to 9.

The Praetor 500 and 600 are improvements of the Legacy 450 and 500, respectively, introduced in October 2018 offering more range. The Praetor 600 has a range of 4,018 nmi (7,440 km; 4,620 mi), while the Praetor 500 has a range of 3,340 nmi (6,190 km; 3,840 mi).

== Development ==
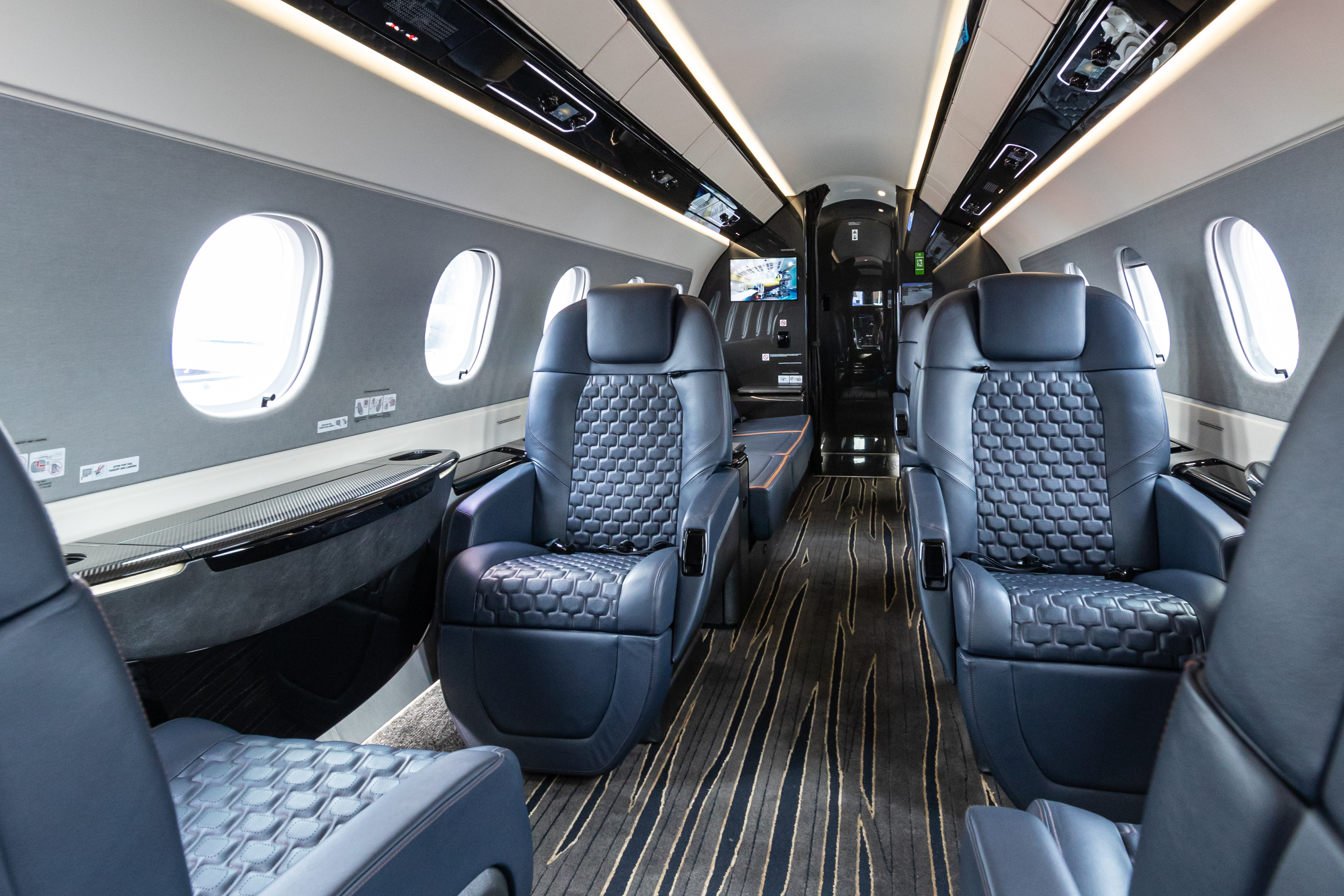
Praetor 600 cabin

At the August 2007 National Business Aviation Association convention, Embraer unveiled a cabin mock-up of two concepts positioned between the $7 million Phenom 300 and the $26 million Legacy 600, called midsize jet (MSJ) and mid-light jet (MLJ), positioned on 22% of the market in units. The proposed aircraft share their flat floor, and stand-up cabin but the MSJ should be 1.5 m (5 ft) longer to accommodate 8 passengers over a 2,800 nmi (5,200 km; 3,200 mi) range against 2,200 nmi (4,100 km; 2,500 mi) for the smaller version.

The program was introduced in April 2008, Embraer planned to invest US$750 million and to introduce the larger model in 2012 and the smaller in 2013. Honeywell HTF7500E turbofans were selected along a Rockwell Collins Pro Line Fusion avionics suite integrated cockpit and a Parker Hannifin fly-by-wire flight control system. At the May 2008 European Business Aviation Convention and Exhibition, the larger was named Legacy 500 priced at $18.4 million and the smaller Legacy 450, priced at $15.25 million. The variants have 95% systems commonality.

An assembly line was officially opened in Melbourne, Florida on 2 June 2016, adding Embraer Legacy 450 and 500 production to the existing Phenom 100 and 300 line, along a completion center/flight-prep building. The first Legacy 450 on the line since May 16 should be delivered in mid-December. The facility will be able to assemble up to 96 Phenoms and 72 Legacys annually. The first Legacy 450 produced in Florida was delivered in December 2016; the fuselage is built in Botucatu in Brazil, and the wings in Évora, Portugal. The first Legacy 500 entered final assembly in January 2017 and was flown in July. Embraer will eventually move most of its Legacy 450/500 production in Florida but has not set up a schedule yet.

=== Praetor 500/600 ===
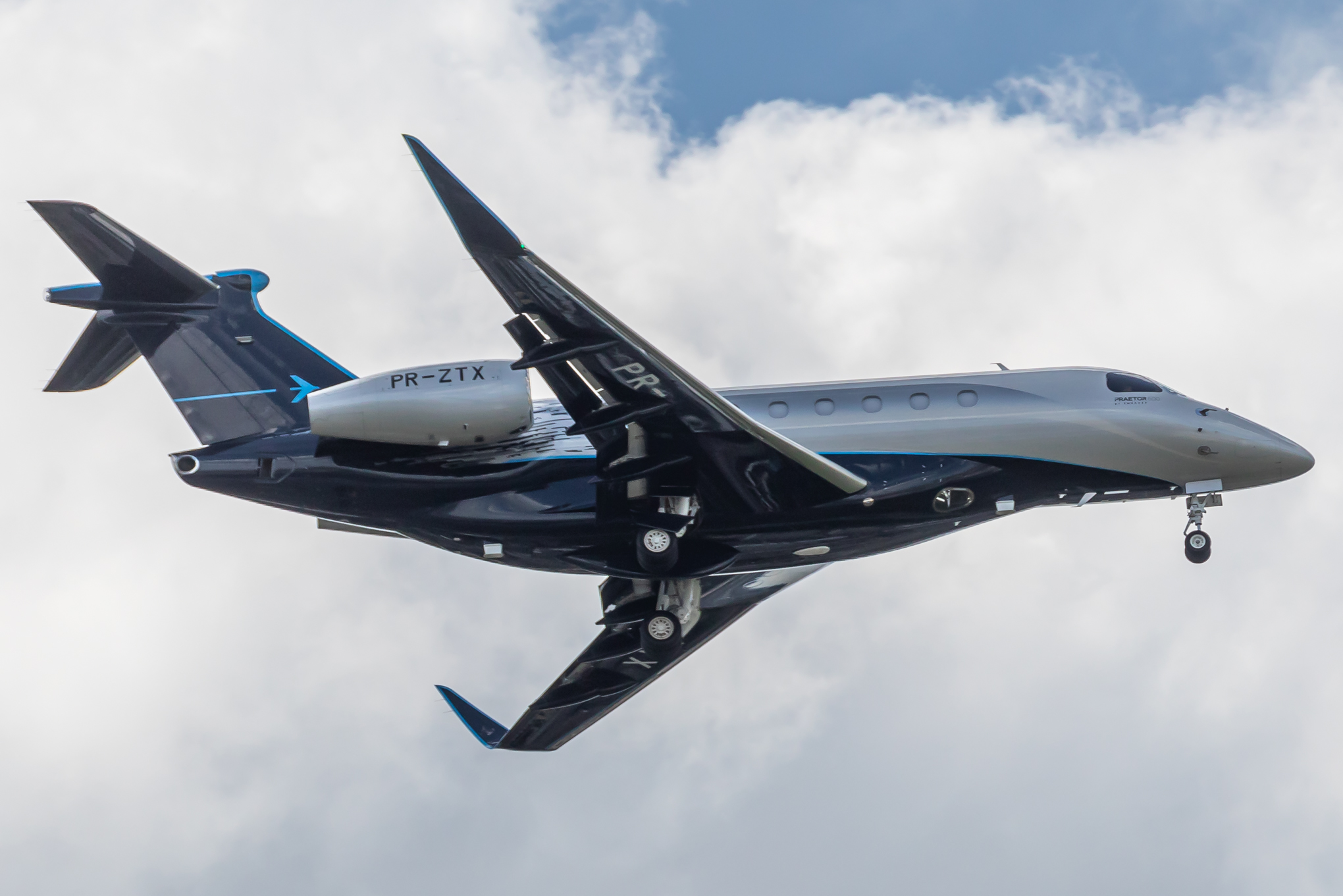
Praetor 600 with longer ventral fuel tank and larger winglets

Embraer introduced improved variants at the October 2018 NBAA convention, the Praetor 500 and 600, presented on display, with 3,250 nmi (6,020 km; 3,740 mi) and 3,900 nmi (7,200 km; 4,500 mi) of range; the 600 was expected to be certified in the second quarter of 2019 and the 500 in the third quarter of 2019. Both have 22 by 50 in (56 by 127 cm) taller and wider winglets. The $17 million Praetor 500 boosts the fuel capacity of the Legacy 450 from 12,108 to 13,058 lb (5,492 to 5,923 kg) to match the Legacy 500. The $21 million Praetor 600 is based on the Legacy 500 with two tanks on the fuselage belly for 2,928 lb (1,328 kg) more fuel for a 15,986 lb (7,251 kg) capacity, and more powerful 7,528 lbf (33.49 kN) HTF7500E engines.

Praetor 600 flight testing began on 31 March 2018 and 300h were logged with three aircraft by October 2018, while the Praetor 500 flight tests began on 13 September 2018 with 80h accumulated. The synthetic vision system has a flight guidance system for CAT I airports approach with SBAS, allowing decision height to be reduced from 200 to 150 ft (61 to 46 m). Within US SBAS zones, the synthetic vision guidance system (SVGS) allows autopilot-flown instrument approaches down to 150 ft (46 m) height and 1,300 ft (400 m) RVR without the optional Rockwell Collins EVS and HUD.

Previous Legacy 450s can be upgraded to the Praetor 500 configuration for $500,000. For the higher thrust Praetor 600, Honeywell maintenance plans increases to $294 per engine per hour. Active load alleviation deflects both ailerons upward at 2.0 Gs to prevent overstressing the wing without adding structural weight. At FL410, ISA-7°C to -14°C and Mach 0.77 (508 mph; 442 kn; 818 km/h) cruise, the Praetor 600 burns 1,760 lb (800 kg) of fuel per hour at a weight of 40,500 lb (18,400 kg), increasing to 1,800 to 1,900 lb (820 to 860 kg) at Mach 0.794 (455 kn; 843 km/h) max cruise.

The Praetor 600 was certified by the National Civil Aviation Agency of Brazil by April 2019. Its range with four passengers and NBAA IFR reserves reached 4,018 nmi (7,441 km; 4,624 mi) from a 4,436 ft (1,352 m) take-off, and 3,719 nmi (6,887 km; 4,280 mi) at Mach 0.80. European and US certification were secured by May. The first delivery, to a European customer, happened on 28 June 2019.

The Praetor 500 received its Brazilian type certificate in August, achieving a 3,340 nautical miles (6,186 km) range, 466 kn (863 km/h; 536 mph) high-speed cruise, a takeoff within 4,222 ft (1,287 m) and a landing within 2,086 ft (636 m).

This was followed by the EASA and FAA approval by the end of September.

On 1st July 2019 the first Praetor 600 was delivered to the Maltese operator Luxwing. In December deliveries to Flexjet started two months after signing for 64 jets, including Praetor 500/600s and Phenom 300Es.

In 2023, the equipped price of the Praetor 500 was $18.995M, and $21.995M for the 600.

In February 2026, Embraer announced updated versions of the Praetor business jet family, the Praetor 500E and Praetor 600E, featuring next-generation cabin technology such as advanced cabin management systems, panoramic smart windows, and enhanced passenger comfort features. These E-series models are expected to enter service in 2029.

== Design ==
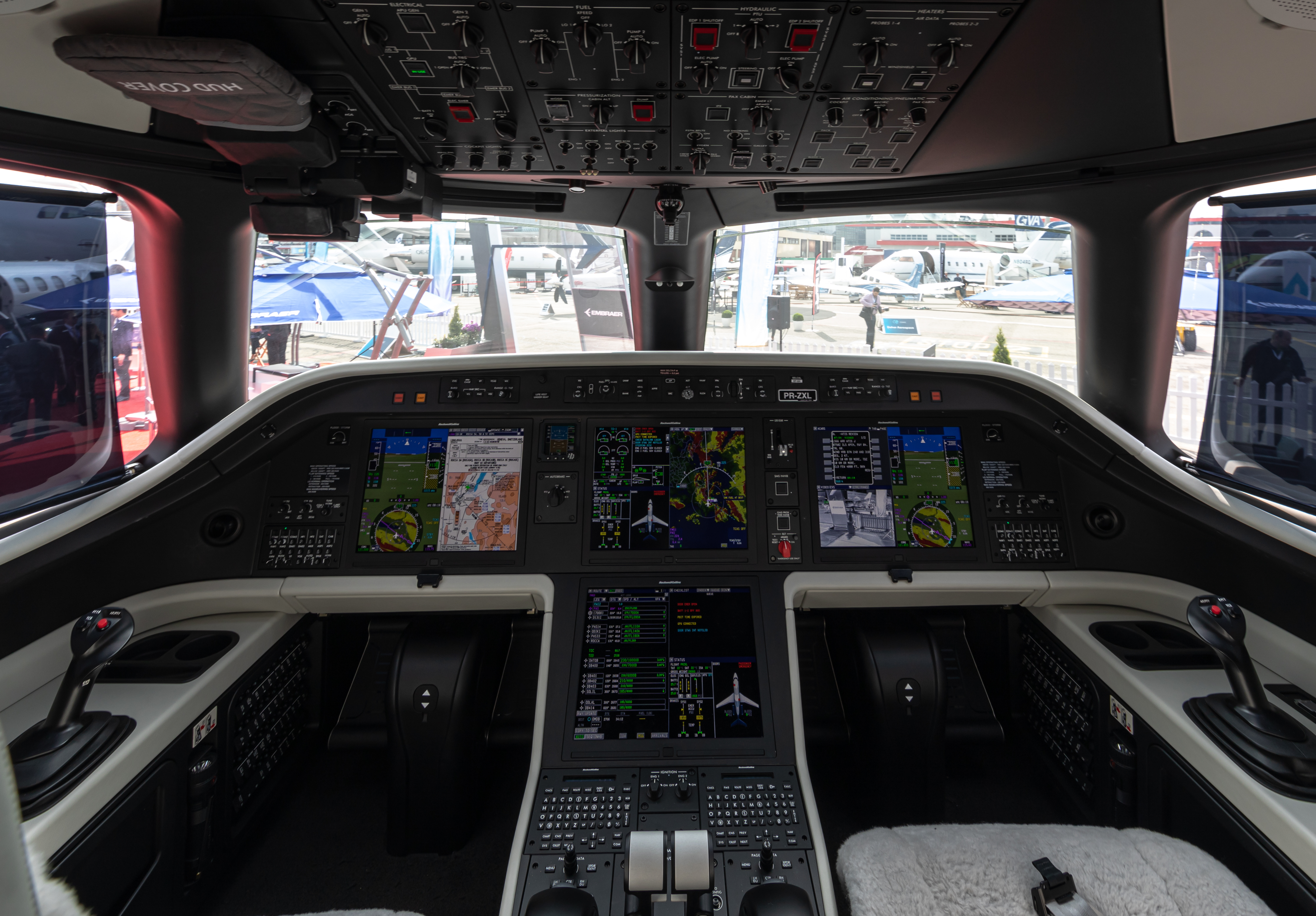
Cockpit with 4 large MFD and sidesticks

They are low wing, T-tail airplanes with cabin pressurization, powered by two rear mounted turbofans. The landing gear is fully retractable and designed to be operated on paved runways only. The glass cockpit includes four multi-function displays. The operation is made through a flight management system with autopilot, autothrottle and closed-loop control and monitoring of flight controls Fly-By-Wire. The aircraft are certified for Day, Night, VFR and IFR flights, and are approved for reduced vertical separation minima (RVSM) airspace and flight into known icing conditions, extended flight over water, Category II ILS, operations at high altitude airports up to 13800 ft and steep approach operations.

Embraer offers an enhanced flight vision system constituted by the Rockwell Collins HGS-3500 Head-up display combined with the EVS-3000 Infrared camera, permitting a decision altitude necessitating visual references of 100 ft above touchdown at a projected price of $515,000. Federal Aviation Administration's draft AC 20-167A further proposes a descent below 100 ft if the required visual references can be observed using the EFVS, similar to Cat II and III approaches with limited instrument landing systems in many small airports.

== Variants ==
=== EMB-550 Legacy 500 ===
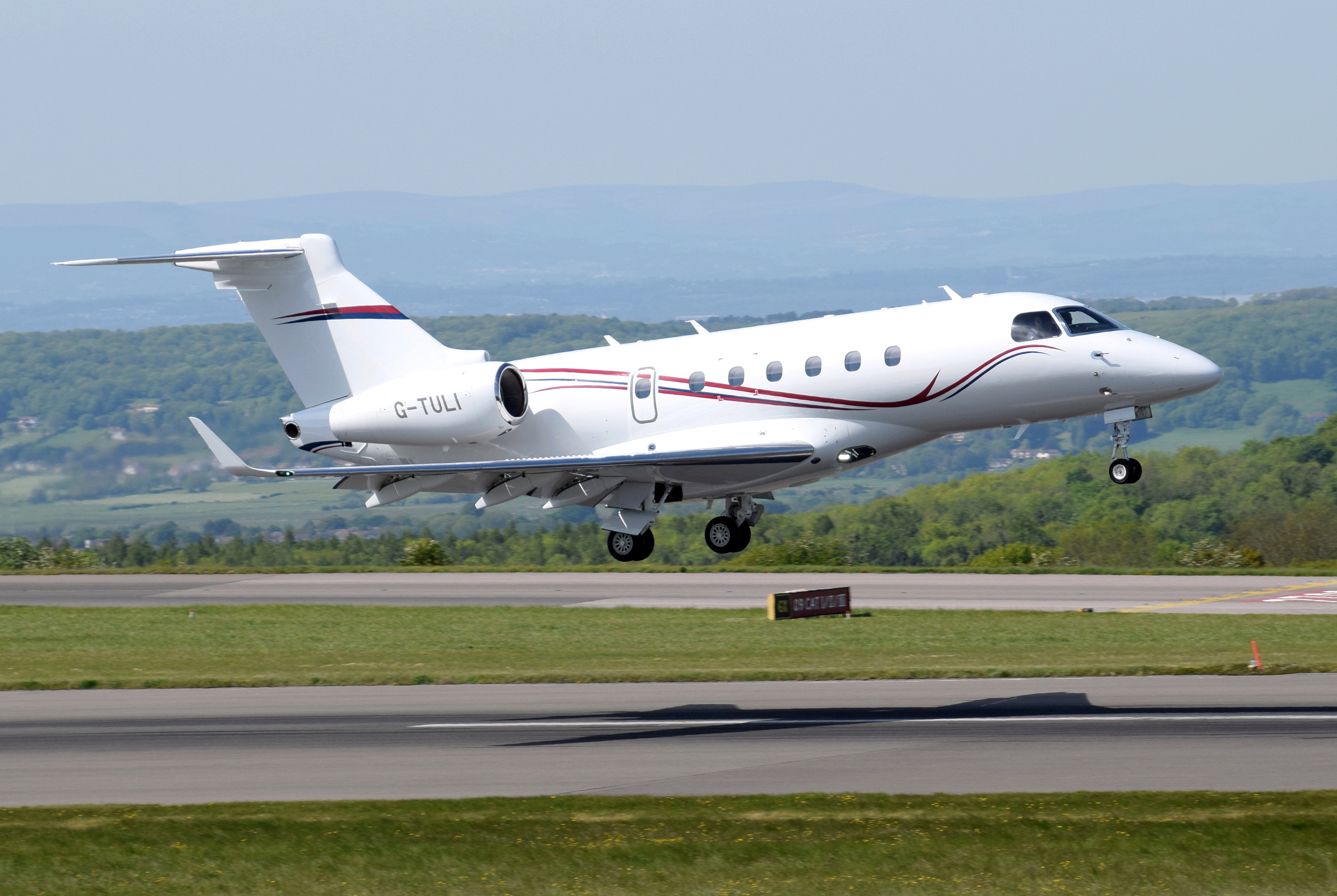
Legacy 500

Embraer's timeline was delayed because software development for the fly-by-wire flight control system was running behind schedule. Supported by 800 engineers, the first Legacy 500 prototype (PT-ZEX) was rolled out on 23 December 2011 to begin ground testing and systems evaluation, prior to the aircraft’s first flight scheduled for the third quarter of 2012. The first engine run was completed on January 17, 2012.

The aircraft's first flight occurred on 27 November 2012, with certification and initial deliveries expected in early 2014. The first flight test crew was composed of the program Test Pilot Eduardo Camelier, Chief Test Pilot Mozart Louzada, Flight Test Director Alexandre Figueiredo and Flight Test Engineer Gustavo Paixao. The maiden flight was from Embraer headquarters at São José dos Campos Airport and all prototypes were flown to the Gaviao Peixoto Airport test facility after their first flight.

After 1,800 hours of flight tests and 20,000 hours of laboratory tests, its type certificate was received from National Civil Aviation Agency of Brazil (ANAC) on August 12, 2014, exceeding design goals. First delivery occurred to a Brazilian company on October 11, 2014. It received its Federal Aviation Administration (FAA) certification on October 21, 2014. Delivery of the 50th Legacy 500 is expected in the third quarter of 2016.

The Legacy 500 can be configured to carry up to 12 passengers, and can carry eight passengers over 2,948 nautical miles (5,460 km; 3,392 mi), or four passengers over 3,125 nautical miles (5,788 km; 3,596 mi). The aircraft fly-by-wire control enhances safety and comfort. Climbing to its FL 430 initial cruise altitude takes 22 min and its 27° wing sweep allow a 436 kn (807 km/h) TAS average long-range cruise, Mach 0.76 - 0.78, while a Mach 0.80 cruise lowers the range by 3%.

The Legacy 500 competes with midsize jets like the $17.9 million Cessna Citation Sovereign+ and $23.4 million Cessna Citation X, but also with super-midsize $24 million Gulfstream G280 and $26 million Bombardier Challenger 350 and can be compared with the halted $21 million Learjet 85 program.

=== EMB-545 Legacy 450 ===
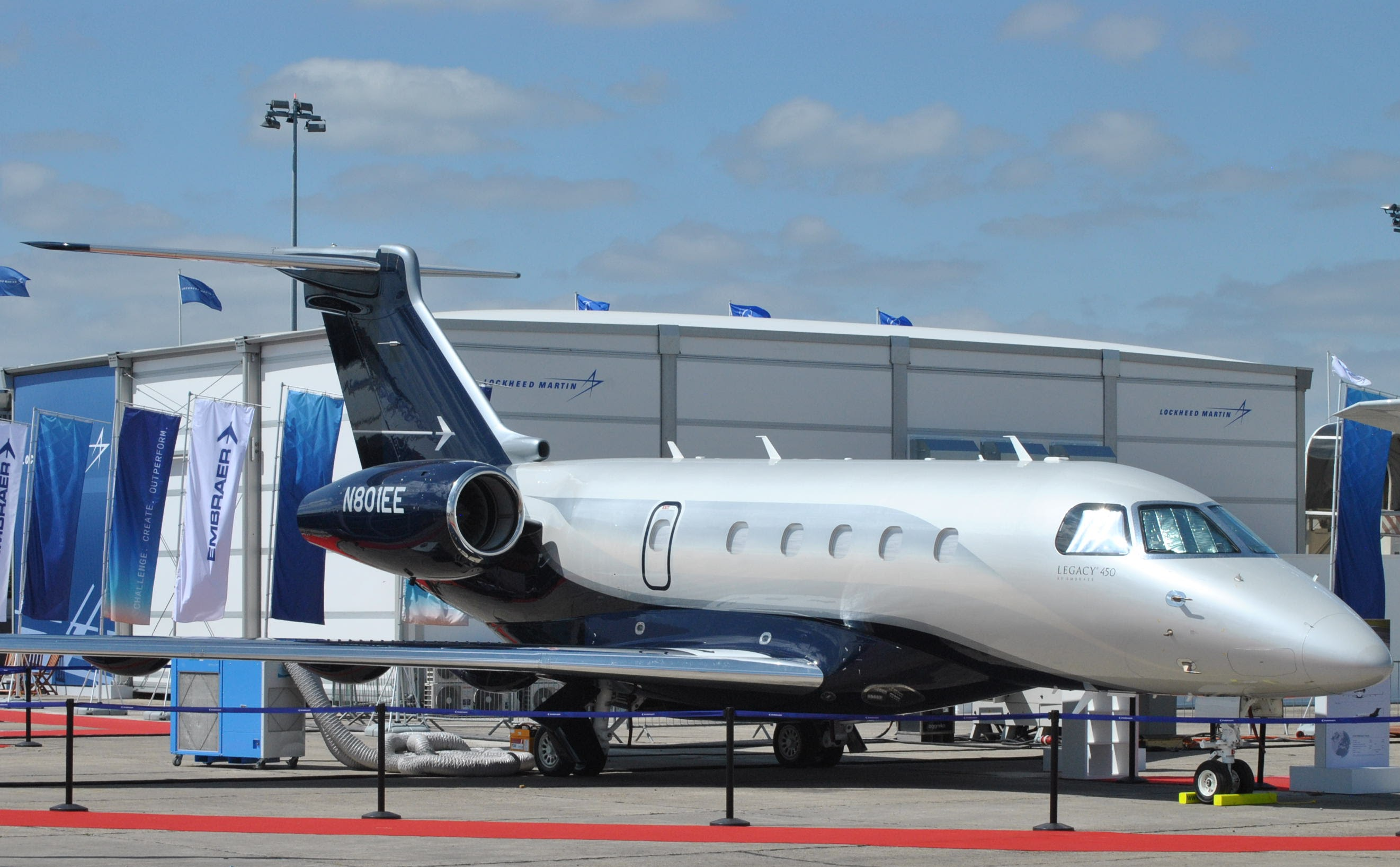
Legacy 450

The Legacy 450 first flight occurred on December 28, 2013. It received its Brazilian certification on 11 August 2015, exceeding its design goals. It was certified by the FAA shortly after on 31 August 2015. Embraer announced on 22 December 2015 its first delivery to LMG, LLC, an American provider of video, audio, and lighting support headquartered in Orlando.

Its fuselage is shortened by 4 feet (122 cm) and it has a flight life of 27,500 flight hours, its stall speed is 104 kn (193 km/h) and its minimum control speed is 142 kn (263 km/h). It competes with the $16.25 million Cessna Citation Latitude and the $17.9 million Cessna Citation Sovereign. In July 2016, its certified range was extended to 2,904 nmi (5,378 km; 3,342 mi), 329 nmi (609 km; 379 mi) more than previously, and it is designed to carry seven to nine passengers.

== Operational history ==
Deliveries
Model	2014	2015	2016	2017	2018	2019	2020	2021	2022	2023	2024	2025	2026	Total
Legacy 450	–	3	12	14	14	15	–	–	–	–	–	–	–	58
Legacy 500	3	20	21	15	9	11	1	–	–	–	–	–	–	80
Praetor 500	–	–	–	–	–	3	10	14	15	20	28	39	27	156
Praetor 600	–	–	–	–	–	13	18	17	21	21	27	30	26	173
Total	3	23	33	29	23	42	29	31	36	41	55	69	34	467

Near 70% of the 50+ Legacy 500s are in the U.S., mostly owned by Fortune 1000 private firms or wealthy individuals. Toluca's Fly Across operates four Legacy 500s, as is Flexjet which plan to trade its five 450s to five 500s to become its largest operator. U.S. jet charter and management company Clay Lacy Aviation operates multiple Legacy-family business jets. The Legacy 500 average mission is less than two hours, and while fleet operators fly them more than 700 hours per year, single-aircraft operators typically fly theirs 150–200 hours per year.

It burns 2,200–2,400 lb (1,000–1,090 kg) of fuel in the first hour, and then 1,700–1,800 lb (770–820 kg) at heavy weights down to 1,500–1,600 lb (680–730 kg) when lighter. Maintenance per flight hour cost US$642 to US$658 for the two Honeywell HTF7500E depending on utilization, while airframe costs US$321 plus US$4,300 per month for low-utilization. Dispatch reliability often exceeds 99% with most components mounted outside the pressure vessel for easy access if it breaks, except batteries and potable water servicing.

The EMB-550 Legacy 500 is known as Embraer IU-50 in the Brazilian Air Force, and used as radar calibration aircraft.

== Specifications ==
Model	Legacy 450	Praetor 500	Legacy 500	Praetor 600
Cockpit crew	Two			
Capacity	7–9 passengers		8–12 passengers	
Baggage capacity	4.2 m^{3} (150 cu ft)		4.4 m^{3} (155 cu ft)	
Length	19.69 m (64 ft 7 in)		20.74 m (68 ft 1 in)	
Height	6.43 m (21 ft 1 in)		6.44 m (21 ft 2 in)	
Wingspan	19.25 m (63 ft 2 in)	21.50 m (70 ft 6 in)	19.25 m (63 ft 2 in)	21.50 m (70 ft 6 in)
Wing area	44.85 m^{2} (482.8 sq ft)			
Basic operating weight (Note: Max. zero fuel weight minus max payload)	10,425 kg (22,983 lb)	10,391 kg (22,908 lb)	10,750 kg (23,700 lb) (Note: operators report 200–400 lb (91–181 kg) heavier BOWs)	11,503 kg (25,360 lb)
Maximum payload	1,325 kg (2,921 lb)		1,300 kg (2,900 lb)	1,500 kg (3,300 lb)
MTOW	16,220 kg (35,759 lb)	17,040 kg (37,567 lb)	17,400 kg (38,360 lb)	19,440 kg (42,858 lb)
Fuel capacity	4,962 kg (10,939 lb)	5,920 kg (13,050 lb)		7,320 kg (16,140 lb)
Cabin altitude	1,829 m (6,000 ft)	1,768 m (5,800 ft)	1,829 m (6,000 ft)	1,768 m (5,800 ft)
Cabin height × width	1.83 m (6 ft) × 2.08 m (6 ft 10 in)			
Cabin length	7 m (24 ft)		8.18 m (26 ft 10 in)	
Turbofan (×2)	Honeywell HTF7500E			
Thrust (ISA + 18°C) (2×)	29.09 kN (6,540 lbf)		31.30 kN (7,036 lbf)	33.49 kN (7,528 lbf)
Max. speed	Mach 0.83			
High cruise speed	856 km/h (462 kn; 532 mph)	863 km/h (466 kn; 536 mph)		
Range†	2,900 nmi (5,400 km; 3,300 mi)	3,340 nmi (6,190 km; 3,840 mi)	3,125 nmi (5,788 km; 3,596 mi)	4,018 nmi (7,441 km; 4,624 mi)
Ceiling	13,716 m (45,000 ft)			
Time to climb	13,000 m (43,000 ft) in 21 min		13,000 m (43,000 ft) in 22 min	
Wing loading	362 kg/m^{2} (74 lb/sq ft)	380 kg/m^{2} (78 lb/sq ft)	388 kg/m^{2} (79 lb/sq ft)	433 kg/m^{2} (89 lb/sq ft)
Take-off distance (Note: MTOW, 4 pax, NBAA IFR reserves, 200 nmi alternative, SL, ISA)	1,191 m (3,907 ft)	1,287 m (4,222 ft)	1,245 m (4,084 ft)	1,352 m (4,436 ft)
Landing distance	637 m (2,090 ft)	636 m (2,086 ft)	647 m (2,122 ft)	692 m (2,270 ft)
Hourly LRC fuel burn	806 L (213 US gal)		893 L (236 US gal)	

== See also ==
Aircraft of comparable role, configuration, and era

- Cessna Citation Latitude
- Cessna Citation Sovereign
- Cessna Citation Longitude
- Gulfstream G280
- Bombardier Challenger 300
- Bombardier Challenger 600 series
