= Jet Express Airlines =

Russian airline

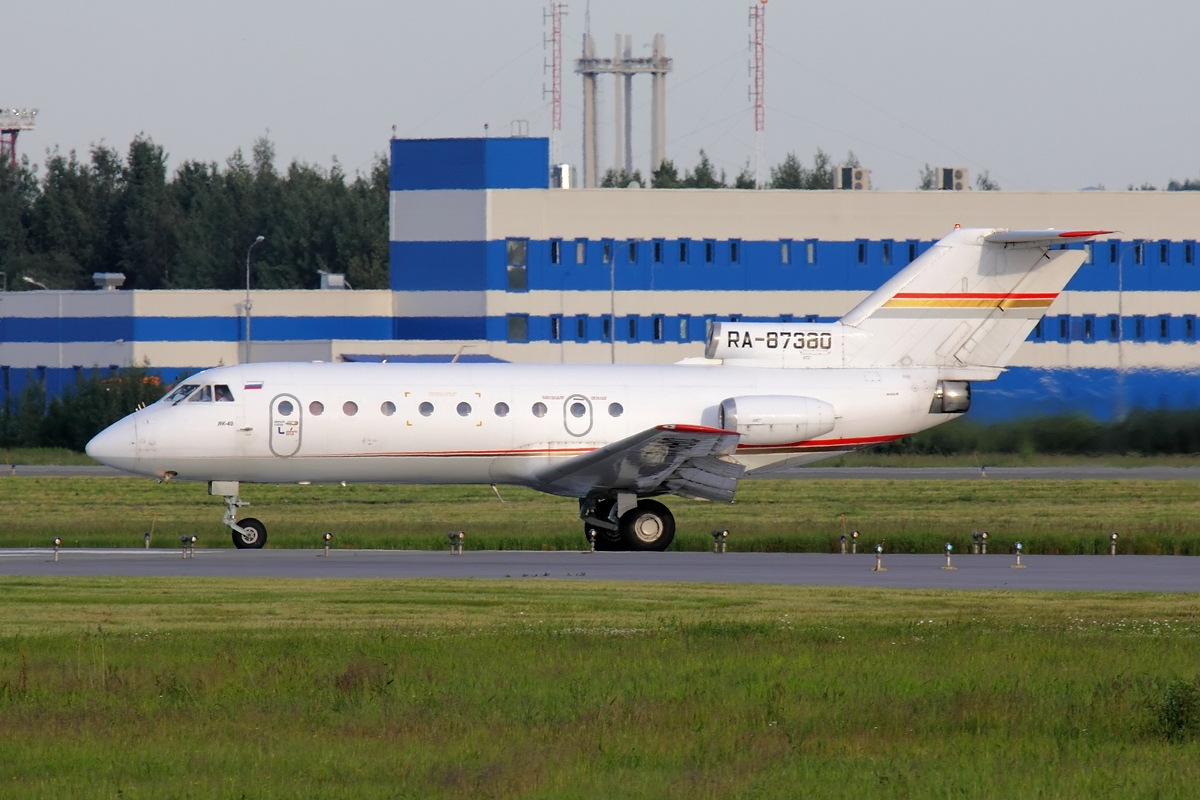
Yakovlev Yak-40 of Jet Express Airlines at Pulkovo Airport in 2012

Jet Express Airlines LLC (Russian: ООО "Джет Экспресс") is an airline based in Kazan and Moscow, Russia. It operates charter flights for VIP passengers. From the May 2023 has changed the name and now is called - Tulpar Aircompany Ltd (ООО "Авиакомпания "Тулпар").

== Fleet ==
as of July 2023, the Jet Express Airlines/Tulpar Aircompany Ltd. fleet included the following aircraft:

Aircraft	In fleet	Notes
Challenger 350	2	
Challenger 850	4	
Global 5000	1	
Total	7	
