= 2015 Blackbushe Phenom 300 crash =

Runway excursion accident in England

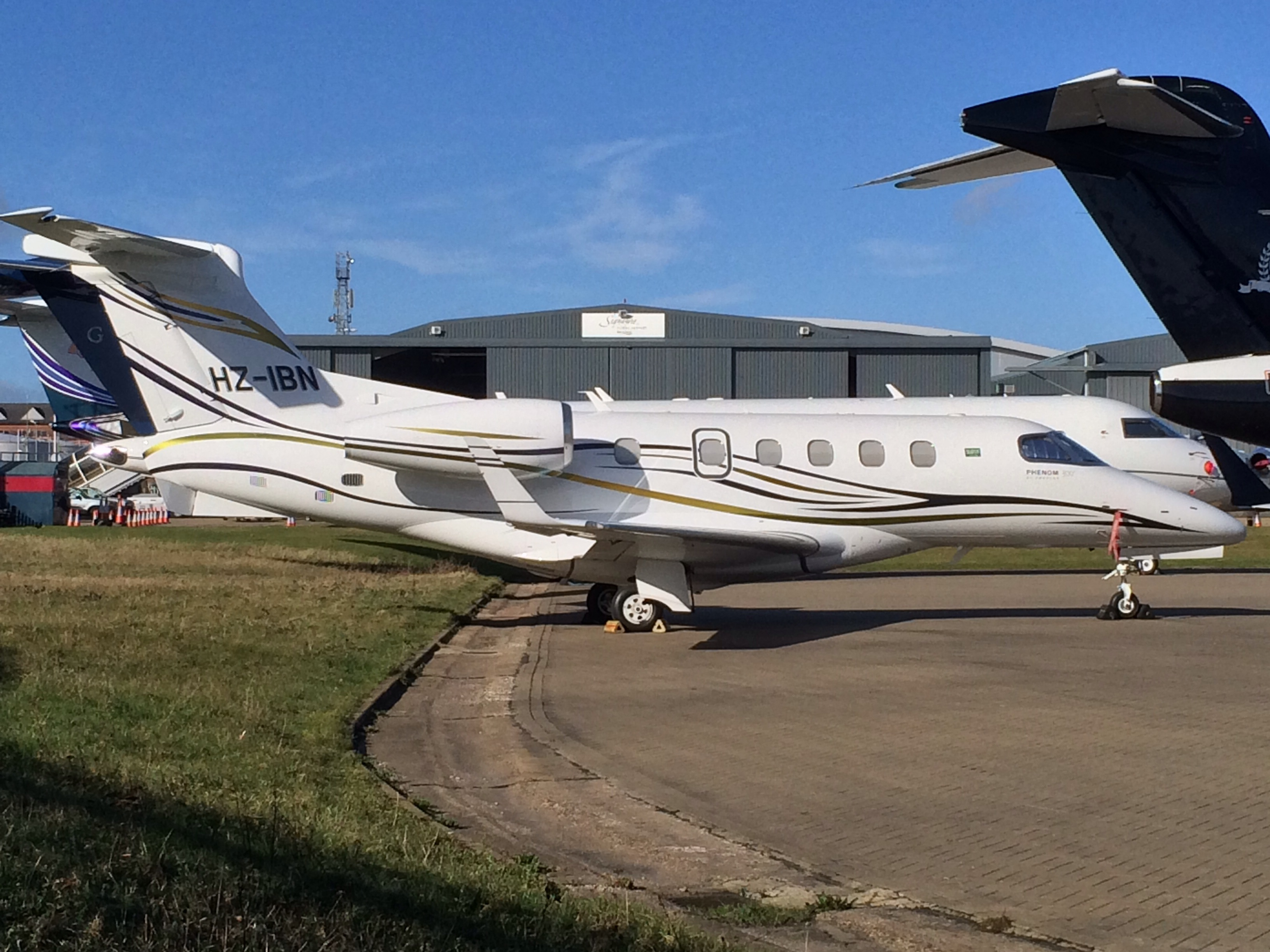
- HZ-IBN, the aircraft involved in the accident, photographed in 2014

Accident
- Date: 31 July 2015
- Summary: Runway overrun on landing
- Site: Blackbushe Airport, Hampshire, England; 51°19′19.55″N 0°51′29.09″W

Aircraft
- Aircraft type: Embraer Phenom 300
- Operator: Salem Aviation
- Registration: HZ-IBN
- Flight origin: Milan–Malpensa Airport, Lombardy, Italy
- Destination: Blackbushe Airport
- Occupants: 4
- Passengers: 3
- Crew: 1
- Fatalities: 4
- Survivors: 0

On 31 July 2015, an Embraer Phenom 300 business jet crashed into a car park next to Blackbushe Airport in Hampshire, United Kingdom, while attempting to land. The sole pilot and all three passengers on board were killed. The three passengers were members of the bin Laden family.

The subsequent inquiry found no evidence of any pre‑existing technical defect in the aircraft and concluded that "several factors combined to create a very high workload for the pilot [...] leading him to become fixated on continuing the approach."

== Aircraft ==
The aircraft involved was an Embraer Phenom 300 light business jet manufactured in 2010, serial number 50500040 and registered in Saudi Arabia as HZ-IBN. The plane was owned by Salem Aviation of Jeddah, Saudi Arabia, which was the aircraft's first owner. Salem Aviation is owned by the bin Laden family.

== Flight ==
At the time of the crash, the aircraft was on a flight from Milan Malpensa Airport, Italy, to Blackbushe Airport with three passengers, all Saudi nationals, and one crew member, a Jordanian pilot, on board. The passengers were 75-year-old Raja Bashir Hashim, one of the wives of Osama bin Laden's father Mohammed bin Awad bin Laden (who had died in an aircraft crash in 1967), as well as her 53-year-old daughter Sana Mohammed Bin Laden and Sana's husband 56-year-old Zuhair Anuar Hashim. The pilot was 57-year-old Mazen al-Dajah, who had 11,000 flight hours, including 1,181 hours on the Embraer Phenom 300. He had previously served as an Airbus A320 pilot. The aircraft involved had no prior incidents; weather conditions for the approach into Blackbushe Airport were warm and sunny, with very good visibility and winds from the south.

== Crash ==
The crash occurred at 15:00 BST. Shortly before landing and while flying along the landing circuit, the pilot received a traffic collision avoidance system (TCAS) advisory message warning him of the presence of a microlight aircraft also in the circuit. Six times during the Phenom's final approach, the terrain awareness and warning system issued "pull up" warnings. As it reached the runway threshold, the jet was travelling at 151 knots (280 km/h), 43 knots (80 km/h) faster than its final approach target speed of 108 knots (200 km/h).

Based on tyre marks left on the runway, the aircraft touched down two-thirds of the way along the runway, leaving only about 440 m (1,440 ft) of runway in which to stop. The aircraft landed at a speed of 134 knots (248 km/h) (compared to the 108 knots (200 km/h) recommended by the manufacturer); the required stopping distance at this speed would have been more than 600 m (2,000 ft). It struck an earthen bank and became briefly airborne again before coming to a rest in the car park of a British Car Auctions facility, directly adjacent to Blackbushe Airport. The wreckage caught fire within one second of coming to rest. Several fire engines attended the scene to extinguish the fire, which was complicated by the burning wreckage setting alight several cars around the wreckage in the car park.

All four people on board the aircraft survived the landing, but were killed by the post-crash fire. No-one on the ground was injured.

== Investigation ==
The Air Accidents Investigation Branch (AAIB) opened an investigation into the accident. In August 2015, the AAIB issued a Special Bulletin that described the accident sequence. The final report was published in December 2016.

It was established that the aircraft's final approach was not stable, the speed at landing was excessive, and the touchdown point too far down the runway for the aircraft to stop safely within the remaining length. The AAIB concluded that "several factors combined to create a very high workload for the pilot. This may have saturated his mental capacity, impeding his ability to handle new information and adapt his mental model, leading him to become fixated on continuing the approach."

The place where the aircraft ended up meant that fire-fighting was delayed, as access was through a locked gate and the first two airport fire appliances had to await the arrival of the third, which carried the key. However, the report suggested that the delay did not affect the duration of the fire, which in any case would have continued until all the fuel was consumed. The airport operator subsequently ensured that each vehicle carries necessary keys, and made improvements to documentation.
