= Pan Européenne Air Service =

French airline

Pan-Européenne Air Service

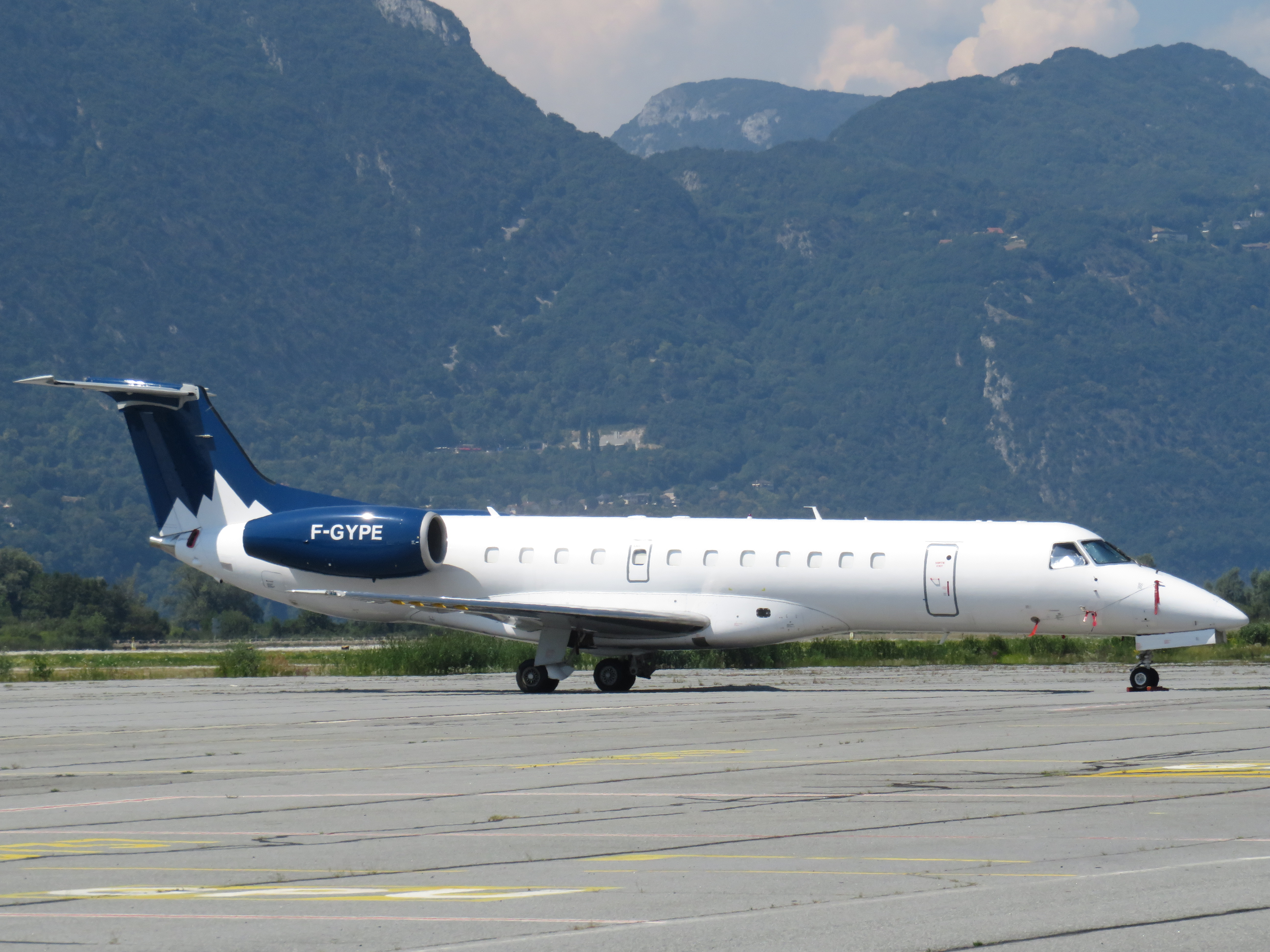
- Embraer ERJ 135LR
IATA	ICAO	Call sign
-	EUP / PEA	SAVOY / PEA
- Founded: 1977
- Hubs: Chambéry Airport; Lyon-Bron Airport
- Fleet size: 5
- Headquarters: Chambéry, France
- Website: http://www.paneuropeenne.com

Pan Européenne Air Service is a French charter airline based in Chambéry, France. It was established and started operations in 1977, it is the oldest French air-taxi company still in operation. Its main bases are Chambéry Airport and Lyon-Bron Airport, Lyon. Specialized in business charter flights and VIP air taxi flights, Pan-Européenne Air Service operates a fleet of 5 aircraft. The company also runs an Embraer certified maintenance shop, located on Chambéry-Savoie Airport.

== Fleet ==
The Pan-Européenne Air Service fleet currently includes the following aircraft :

Pan-Européenne Air service fleet
Aircraft	In Service	Orders	Retired	Notes
Embraer ERJ 145LR	1	—		(as of July 2026)
Embraer ERJ 135LR	1	—		(as of July 2026)
Embraer Phenom 300	2	—		(as of March 2021)
Embraer Phenom 100	1	—		(as of March 2021)
Beechcraft 1900 D			3	Sold to Twin Jet
Piaggio P180 Avanti I			1	Sold to Oyonnair
Piaggio P180 Avanti II			1	Sold to Oyonnair
Total	5	—		

== Activities ==
Pan-Européenne Air Service operates VIP business flights under public transportation rules from and towards Europe and North-Africa thanks to its Embraer Phenom fleet.

Based on the Chambéry-Savoie Airport, it serves the Alps Ski resorts, such as Courchevel, Megève and Méribel.

The ERJ fleet operates flights for sport teams, shuttle for business companies, or flights for special events. It also operates for the account of Air France-KLM, on regional and European lines.

The Company is flying under the code EUP (callsign: SAVOY) for the ERJ fleet and PEA (callsign: PEA) for the Phenom fleet.

== See also ==
- List of airlines of France
- List of charter airlines
