= Bombardier Challenger =

The Challenger is a family of mid-sized business jets produced by Canadair, and later by Bombardier Aerospace.

Aircraft include:

- Bombardier Challenger 600 series, the original family of business jets, with the CL-600, CL-601, CL-604, and CL-605
- Bombardier Challenger 300, business jet, originally called the Bombardier Continental
- Bombardier Challenger 800/850, a business jet derived from the CRJ-200
