= Flexjet =

Airline of the United States

- A Flexjet Embraer Legacy 450
IATA	ICAO	Call sign
—	LXJ	FLEXJET
- Founded: 15 May 1995 (31 years ago) in Canada by Bombardier Aviation
- AOC #: J7SA150H
- Subsidiaries: Flairjet, Sentient Jet
- Fleet size: 314 jets
- Destinations: Point to point
- Parent company: Directional Aviation
- Headquarters: Richmond Heights, Ohio
- Key people: Kenn Ricci, Chairman; Michael Silvestro, Chief Executive Officer
- Website: flexjet.com

Flexjet, LLC is an American provider of fractional ownership aircraft, leasing, and jet card services. Founded in 1995 as a division of Bombardier Aerospace, it is currently owned by Directional Aviation, an aviation private investment firm.

== Background ==
Flexjet is a provider of fractional jet ownership, leasing, and jet card services as well as private helicopter fractional, leasing and charter services. Directional Aviation, the private investment firm founded by aviation entrepreneur Kenn Ricci, has owned Flexjet since 2013. Headquartered in Richmond Heights, Ohio, Flexjet is led by Ricci, its chairman, and by Michael J. Silvestro, its chief executive officer. Flexjet is one of the largest fractional private jet companies. The company serves over 2,100 clients.

== History ==
Founded in 1995, Flexjet entered the fractional jet ownership market as a division of Bombardier Aerospace, the world's largest business aviation manufacturer and itself a division of Bombardier Inc.

By 1998, doing business as Business Jet Solutions, Flexjet had 41 aircraft, including the Learjet 31A, Learjet 45, Learjet 60, and Challenger 600 series, serving more than 200 clients.

At one time, Flexjet offered not only fractional ownership and jet card but also aircraft charter services. Flexjet entered the charter market in 2000 when Bombardier Aerospace acquired Skyjet, which pioneered the online booking of private jet charters. Under Bombardier, Skyjet became one of the first companies to offer a membership program; eventually, the program became the Skyjet Card.

By 2002, Flexjet had seen 20 percent annual growth since its founding. It employed more than 1,000 people, half of them flight crew members and operated a fleet of 105 aircraft to serve 640 owners. At the time, Flexjet held an approximately one-sixth of the total fractional market, which then amounted to 650 aircraft and 3,500 owners.

Flexjet saw its first substantial profit in 2006, with sales of fractional shares up 28 percent and revenue up 30 percent compared to 2005. It maintained the approximate 16 percent share of the fractional market it had enjoyed four years earlier. During this period, the company began expanding its range of aircraft, including the Learjet 40 and 45, 60, 60 XR, Challenger 300, Challenger 604, and Challenger 605.

In 2008, VistaJet acquired the firm's non-U.S. operations, then branded as Skyjet International. Subsequently, Flexjet consolidated the remaining domestic charter services under its own brand.

In September 2013, private aviation investment firm Directional Aviation announced that it would acquire Flexjet from Bombardier for $185 million in cash. At the same time, Flexjet placed orders with Bombardier for 85 jets valued at about $1.8 billion, with options for up to an additional 160 jets that could bring the contract's value to $5.2 billion.

In 2014, Flexjet exited the charter market. As part of the first consolidation of its aviation companies, Directional Aviation moved the charter brokerage operations of its Flexjet and Sentient Jet companies to the Skyjet brand. Skyjet would concentrate solely on charter services, with Flexjet continuing to offer fractional programs and Sentient Jet offering jet card programs. Flexjet offered three programs: fractional ownership, lease, and the Flexjet 25 Jet Card.

In 2015, Flexjet launched Red Label, an offering under which each aircraft has a dedicated flight crew, customized interiors, and customized seating configurations making up one of the industry's most modern fleet of aircraft.

Other developments included the 2016 opening of the company's first exclusive private jet terminal, in Naples, Florida, followed by the opening of similar facilities at West Palm Beach, Florida and Westchester County Airport, New York. Additional facilities since have been opened at Love Field in Dallas, Texas; Teterboro Airport in Bergen County, New Jersey; and Van Nuys Airport in Los Angeles, California.

Flexjet also announced the launch of intra-European service in 2016, establishing the infrastructure for its offering initially through the acquisition of United Kingdom-based charter and management company Flairjet. More recently, OneSky acquired United Kingdom-headquartered PrivateFly, a digital booking service for private jet charter flights. Flexjet also acquired an Air Operator Certificate (AOC) for and opened a new Malta Operational Centre in Sliema, continuing the expansion of its European operation.

In late 2019, Flexjet announced its European operation would be led by Marine Eugène, former head of sales in Europe for NetJets. Flexjet's European expansion continued with the opening of Flexjet House in London to serve as their European headquarters. In addition, a European Tactical Control Center to coordinate flight logistics and an aircraft maintenance facility were opened at Farnborough Airport in the United Kingdom.

In 2021, Flexjet acquired two leading helicopter travel providers: U.K.-based Halo Aviation and U.S.-based Associated Aircraft Group. The company added private helicopter leasing and charter services and formed a private helicopter division that sells fractional, lease and on-demand charter access to its fleet of owned and operated Sikorsky S-76 private helicopters serving locations throughout the Northeastern United States and Florida.

In 2022, Flexjet announced plans to hire 350 pilots in addition to its current total of 800 and add another 50 aircraft by the end of the year.

In October 2022, Flexjet agreed to enter into an agreement to merge with Horizon Acquisition Corporation II (NYSE: HZON), a publicly traded special-purpose acquisition company (SPAC) led by Todd Boehly. Following completion of the merger, Flexjet would become a publicly traded company under the ticker symbol “FXJ.” In April 2023, Flexjet announced the deal would be terminated.

Flexjet has received awards and certifications for safety including the Federal Aviation Administration's Diamond Award of Excellence for Aviation Maintenance, awarded to Flexjet in 2022 for the 23rd consecutive year. Flexjet also has received the Aviation Research Group/US (ARG/US) Platinum Safety Rating since 2008.

In July 2025, Flexjet completed an $800 million equity investment round led by L Catterton, the private equity firm backed by luxury conglomerate LVMH, with participation from KSL Capital Partners and J. Safra Group. The funding, described as the largest equity financing deal in private aviation history, valued the company at $4 billion. Of the total investment, $200 million went to existing shareholders while $600 million was allocated for infrastructure development and company growth.

In Sep 2025, Flexjet announced the addition of the Gulfstream G700 to its fleet, expanding its ultra-long-range aircraft offerings. The G700, recognized as the largest and fastest business jet produced by Gulfstream Aerospace, became available to Flexjet clients through the company’s fractional ownership program. This addition provided immediate access to the aircraft’s advanced range capabilities and enhanced cabin design, further strengthening Flexjet’s position in the global private aviation market.

== Incidents ==
On February 25, 2025, Flexjet flight 560 was involved with a runway incursion incident at Chicago Midway International Airport when the aircraft failed to hold short of runway 31C as instructed by air traffic control, and proceeded to cross onto the runway, prompting Southwest flight 2504 to perform a go-around maneuver to avoid a collision during its final approach. Both the National Transportation Safety Board (NTSB) and the Federal Aviation Administration (FAA) are currently investigating this incident.

== Fleet ==
Flexjet Fleet As of 30 November 2025
Aircraft	Type	In service	Passengers	Ref
Embraer Phenom 300	Light Jet	61	7	
Embraer Legacy 450/500 and Praetor 500/600	Mid-Size Jet	93	8 or 9	
Bombardier Challenger 300 (Challenger 350/3500)	Super Mid-Size Jet	100	8 or 9	
Gulfstream G450	Large Cabin Jet	29	16	
Gulfstream G650 ER	Ultra-Long-Range Jet	28	15	
Gulfstream G700	Ultra-Long-Range Jet	3	15	
Total		314		

== See also ==
- Fractional ownership of aircraft
- AirSprint
- Jet Aviation
- NetJets
- PlaneSense
- VistaJet
- Wheels Up
