= Flairjet =

British charter operator

FlairJet
IATA	ICAO	Call sign
—	FLJ	FLAIRJET
- Founded: 2009; 17 years ago
- Operating bases: Birmingham Airport; Leeds Bradford Airport
- Fleet size: 5
- Parent company: Flexjet
- Headquarters: Birmingham Airport
- Key people: Gerry Rolls (Flight Operations Director/Head of Training); Mike Chamberlain (Accountable Manager)
- Website: www.flair-jet.com

FlairJet Limited is an affiliate company of Flexjet and operates the remanufactured Nextant 400XTi.

== History ==
The airline was founded in 2009 by former airline pilot David Fletcher and introduced to European operation the Embraer Phenom 100 and 300 business jets.

Additionally, FlairJet specialises in the acceptance and delivery of Embraer business aircraft and has, up to April 2012, accepted 12 from the Brazilian manufacturer. FlairJet is also the leading European provider of Phenom 100 and 300 in-aircraft training and mentoring solutions.

Following a 2013 acquisition by Marshall Aerospace, FlairJet was sold to Flexjet, in 2016.
