= Embraer Unidade Gavião Peixoto Airport =

Private airport in São Paulo, Brazil

Gavião Peixoto Embraer Section Embraer Unidade Gavião Peixoto
- IATA: none; ICAO: SBGP; LID: SP0075

Summary
- Airport type: Private
- Owner/Operator: Embraer
- Serves: Gavião Peixoto
- Time zone: BRT (UTC−03:00)
- Elevation AMSL: 609 m (1,998 ft)
- Coordinates: 21°45′52″S 048°24′17″W
- Website: www.embraer.com/pt-BR/ConhecaEmbraer/PresencaGlobal/Paginas/Home.aspx

Map
- Location in Brazil SBGP (Brazil)

Runways
Direction	Length		Surface
Direction	m	ft	Surface
02R/20L	4,967	16,295	Asphalt
02L/20R	1,800	5,910	Dirt
- Sources: ANAC, DECEA

Embraer Unidade Gavião Peixoto (ICAO: SBGP) is a private aerodrome located near Gavião Peixoto, São Paulo, Brazil. It is owned and operated by Embraer and used for testing civil and military aircraft.

== History ==
=== Embraer ===
In October 2001 Embraer opened a plant on the Aerodrome of Gavião Peixoto, near Araraquara, to house the final assembly of aircraft and to test equipment and technology. For this purpose, Embraer built runway 02/20 with 4,967 × 45 m, considered to be the longest public use runway in the Americas and the third longest in the world. However, some length of this is taken up by a displaced threshold, leaving only 2,975 m available for northwards landings. Embraer offers customer support for its clientele on the site.

The plant manufactures the wings of the Embraer 190 and 195, the Embraer EMB 314 Super Tucano and Embraer KC-390 aircraft, the refurbishing of the Northrop F-5 of the Brazilian Air Force, and since 2008 the final assembly of Phenom 100 and Phenom 300 aircraft.

=== Saab ===
On 9 May 2023, Saab opened an assembly line for the Saab Gripen E at Unidade Gavião Peixoto Airport. It is the first Gripen assembly line outside of Sweden and will produce at least 15 of the Brazilian Air Force's order of 36 aircraft. It is intended that the first aircraft produced on this production line will be delivered in 2025.

== Airlines and destinations ==
No scheduled flights operate at this airport.

== Access ==
The airport is located 18 km (11 mi) from downtown Gavião Peixoto and 42 km (26 mi) from downtown Araraquara.

== See also ==
- List of airports in Brazil
