= Embraer Phenom 300 =

Light business jet

Phenom 300
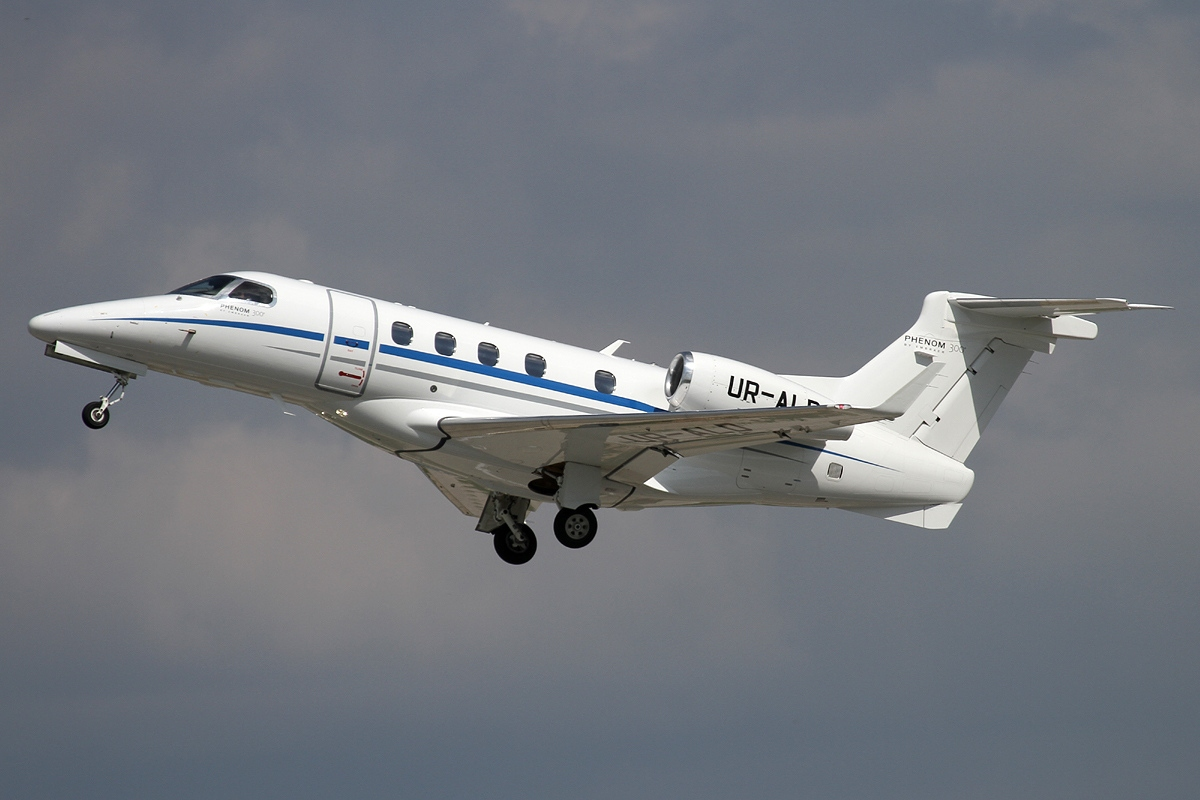
- Phenom 300 with gear retracting

General information
- Type: Light business jet
- National origin: Brazil
- Manufacturer: Embraer
- Status: In production, in service
- Number built: 961 (as of Q3 2026)

History
- Manufactured: 2009–present
- Introduction date: 2009
- First flight: 2008
- Developed from: Embraer Phenom 100

The Embraer EMB-505 Phenom 300 is a light business jet designed and produced by the Brazilian aerospace manufacturer Embraer. Certified for single-pilot operations, it can carry up to 11 occupants. Work on the Phenom 300 started in response to customer demands for a larger business aircraft than the Phenom 100, a very light jet. While the design team originally intended for the aircraft to be a straightforward stretched derivative of the Phenom 100, a clean sheet approach was later adopted. The Phenom 300 featured more powerful engines, the addition of spoiler and winglets, along with an elongated cabin to accommodate more passengers. Several features, from its cabin and interior design to its landing gear and structure, can be traced back to the Phenom 100.

The prototype Phenom 300 conducted its maiden flight on 29 April 2008, type certification was received on 3 December 2009, permitting its entry into service that same month. In 2013, the Phenom 300 was the most delivered business jet. During March 2019, Embraer delivered the 500th Phenom 300, claiming more than half of the light jet market share since 2012. On 31 January 2020, Embraer announced that it was implementing a package of upgrades to the Phenom 300. Certification of the improved Phenom 300E was received during March 2020.

== Development ==
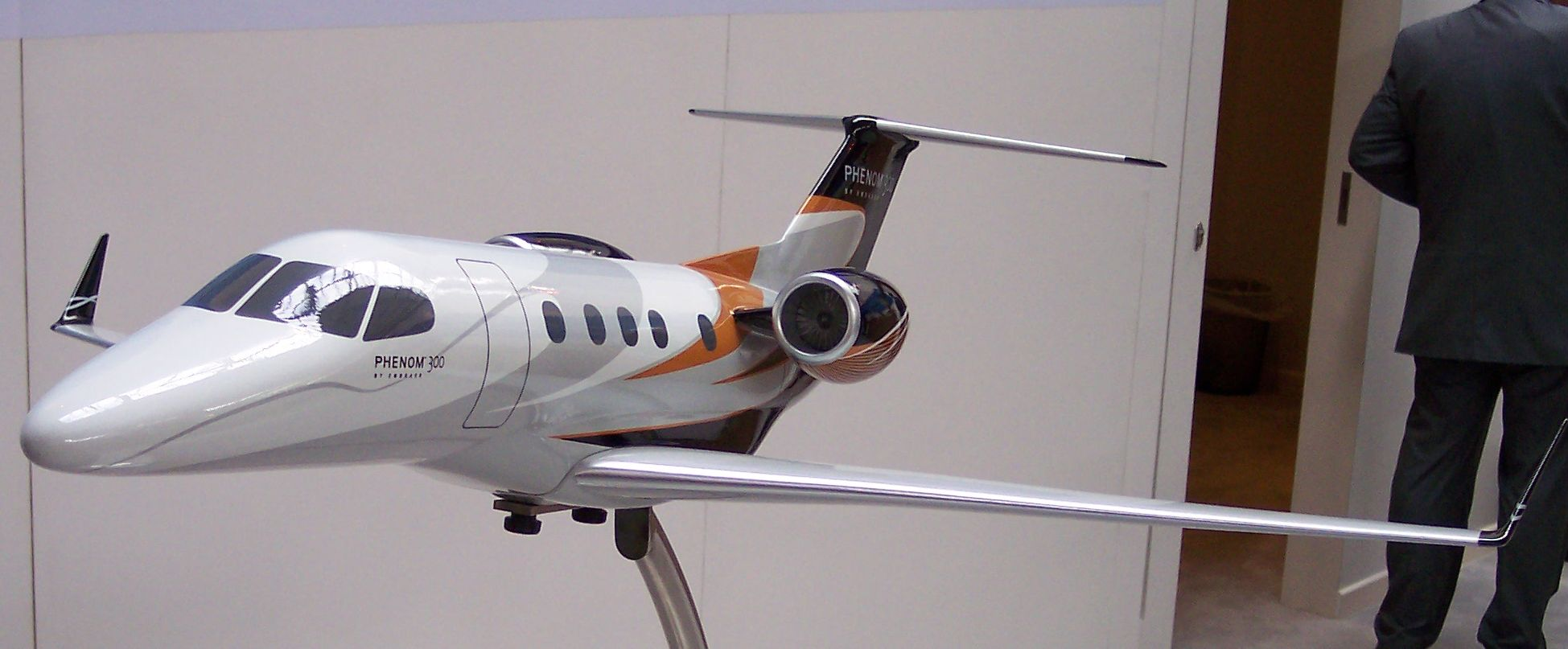
Scale model at ILA Berlin Air Show 2006

During the early 2000s, Embraer was in the process of designing the Phenom 100 light business jet; while conducting market research, it was discovered that numerous potential customers were expressing a desire for an enlarged model of the aircraft. Accordingly, in 2004, it was decided to produce a derivative of the Phenom 100, which the company designated as the Phenom 300. Initial design work was focused on a straightforward scaling up of the Phenom 100, however, Embraer later concluded that a "clean sheet" approach was necessary, leading to the adoption of more powerful engines, spoiler-equipped swept wings, and detachable aluminium winglets. Various features from the Phenom 100 were transferred across, such as its relatively long structural life, an all-composite T-tail, trailing-link landing gear, fly-by-wire brakes, the Prodigy avionics suite, a cabin and cockpit interior designed by BMW DesignWorksUSA.

On 29 April 2008, the prototype Phenom 300 conducted its maiden flight, flown by John Sevalho Corção and Embraer's chief pilot Eduardo Alves Meni; this flight took place several months ahead of the original development schedule. On its second flight, made on 6 May, the prototype was flown from Gavião Peixoto to Embraer's headquarters at São José dos Campos for further evaluation. A total of three Phenom 300s flew roughly 1,400 hours in support of the certification programme. On 3 December 2009, the Phenom 300 received its type certification from the Federal Aviation Administration (FAA). On 29 December 2009, Embraer delivered the first Phenom 300 to Executive Flight Services at the company's headquarters at São José dos Campos, Brazil.

On 31 January 2020, Embraer announced that it was implementing a package of upgrades to the Phenom 300; resulting changes included the maximum speed being increased from Mach 0.78 to 0.80 (446 to 464 kn, 826 to 859 km/h, 513 to 534 mph), expanded endurance from 1,992 to 2,010 nmi (3,689 to 3,723 km; 2,292 to 2,313 mi), and the rated engine thrust being raised from 3,360 to 3,478 lbf (14.95 to 15.47 kN) via the adoption of improved PW535E1 turbofan engines. During March 2020, the Phenom 300E received triple certification from Brazil's ANAC, the FAA, and EASA. By early 2023, the aircraft's equipped price was US$10.995 million.

== Design ==
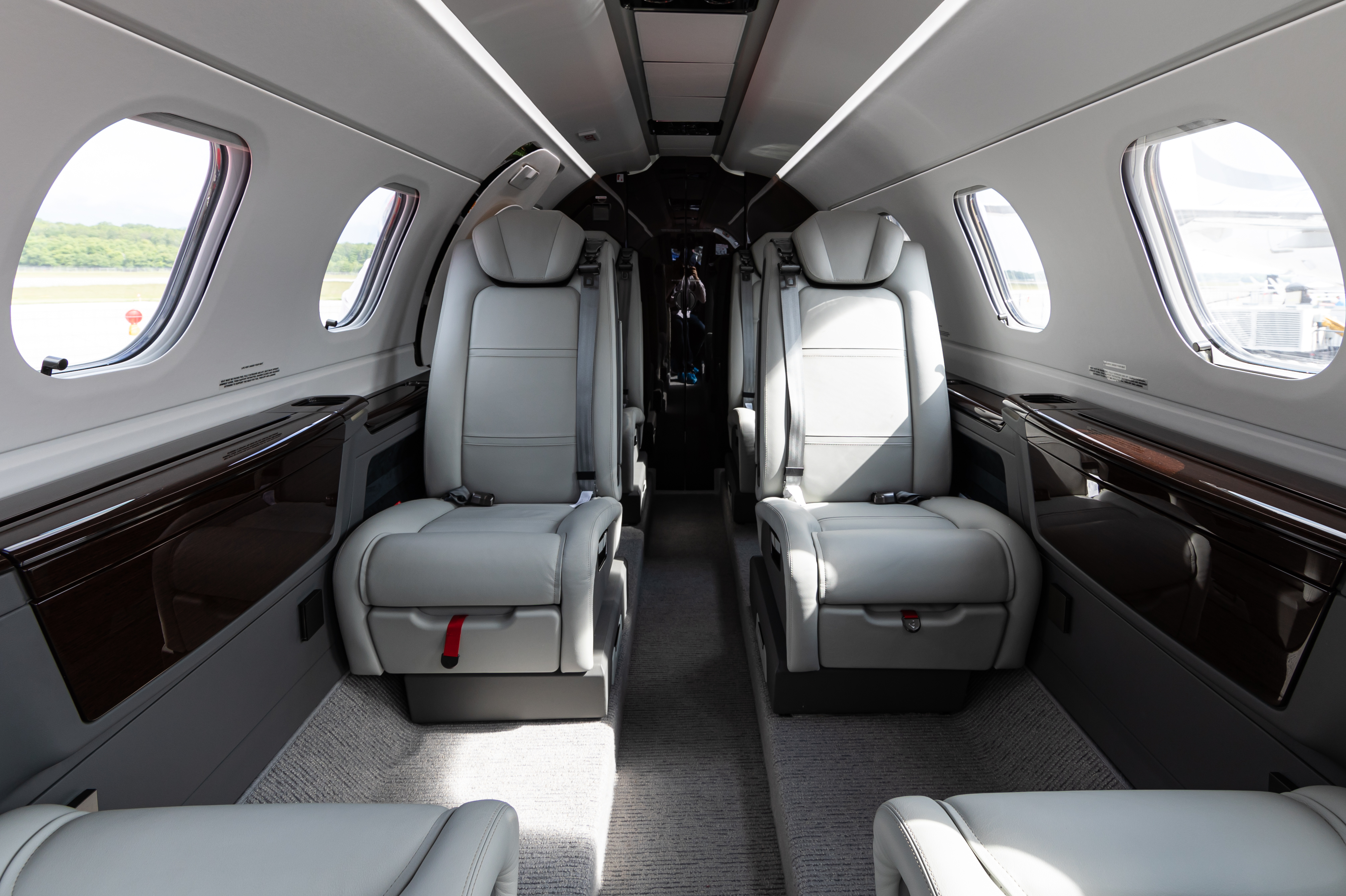
Club seating with recessed aisle

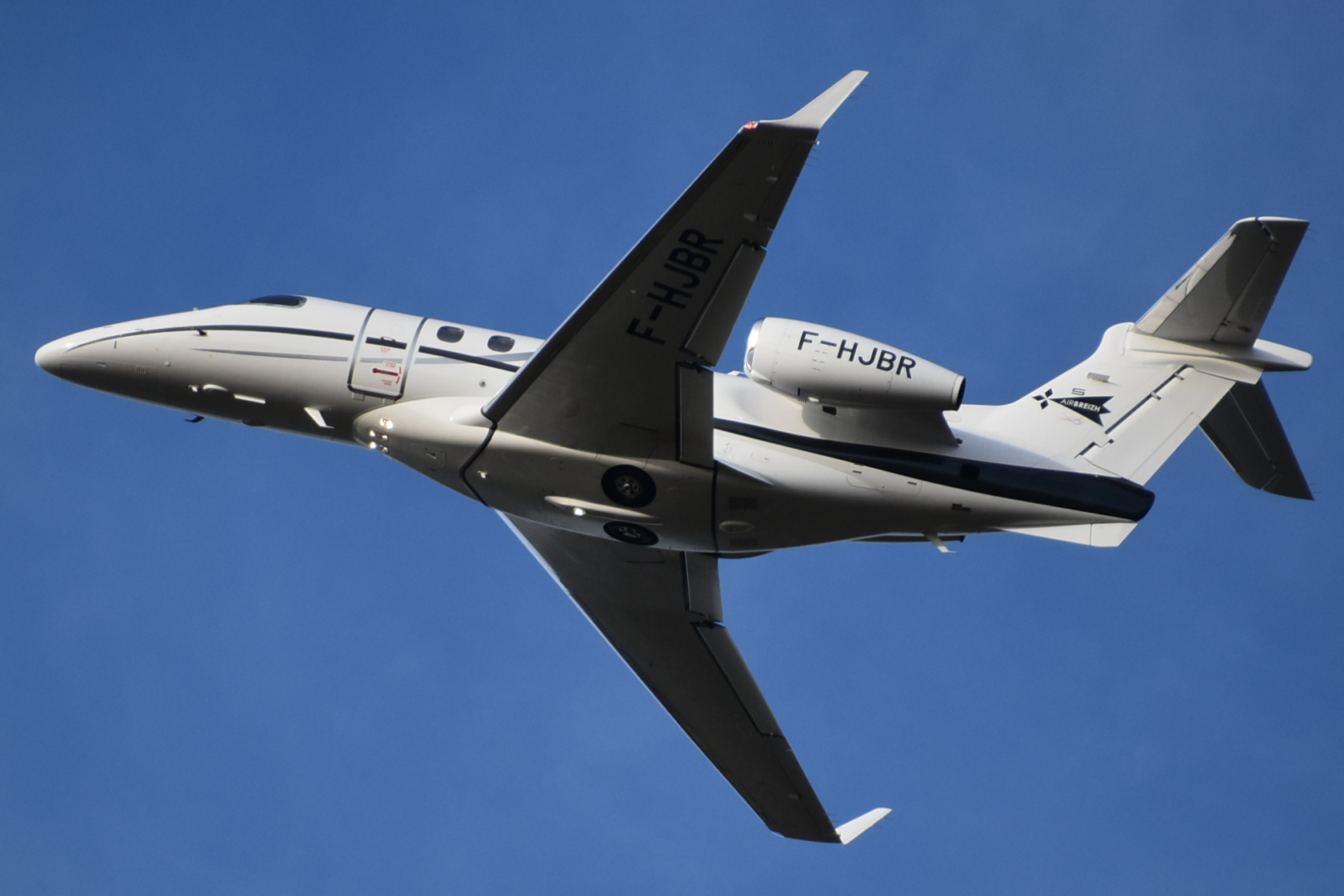
From below, showing its swept wing

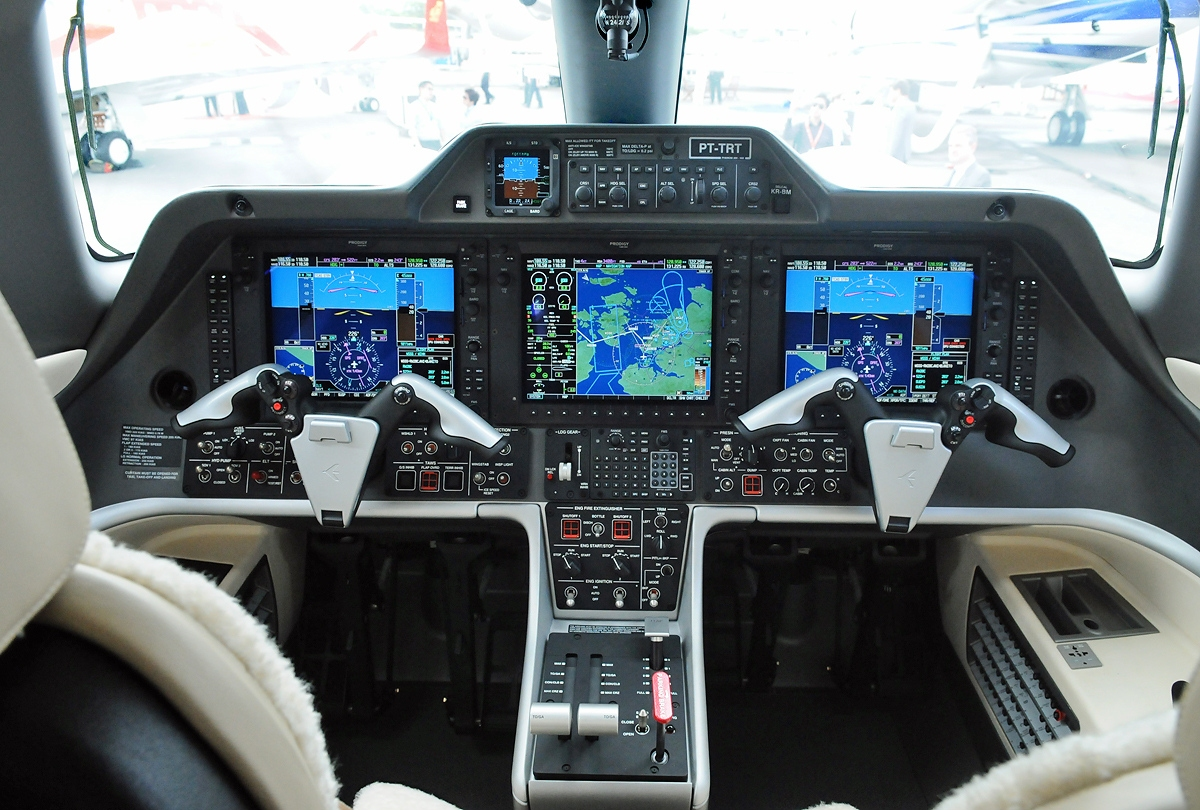
Garmin G1000 based flight deck

The Phenom 300 is a twin-engined cantilever monoplane with low-positioned swept wings. It is powered by a pair of Pratt & Whitney Canada PW535E turbofan engines that are mounted at the rear of the fuselage on pylons. The structure, which comprises 18% composite materials, has a rate lifespan of 28,000 flight cycles or 35,000 flight hours; it is considerably stronger than that of the Phenom 100 in part due to the aircraft's higher operating altitude. It was decided not to equip the Phenom 300 with thrust reversers, instead relying on the use of fly-by-wire brakes with anti-skid protection incorporated. It also has retractable tricycle landing gear. Despite the aircraft's increased size, the Phenom 300 is capable of flying out of various smaller commuter airports, such as London City and Telluride Regional Airport.

The cabin can accommodate up to nine passengers along with a two-pilot crew; an additional passenger can be carried when being flown by a single pilot. Optional cabin fittings include rotating seats and a two-person side-facing divan in lieu of the seventh seat in the front. The addition of a galley also comes at the cost of the seat opposite the entry door. Access to the cockpit and cabin is via an airstair on the left-hand side. The Phenom 300 is equipped with an externally serviced private rear lavatory and is outfitted for single-point refueling. For additional comfort, soundproofing is integrated along with the careful designing of various mechanical components to reduce noise generation. It has an unpressurised cargo hold, large enough to hold six pairs of skis (or six golf bags), six roll-on bags, and six laptop bags.

The cockpit of the Phenom 300 is equipped with three Garmin G1000 12in (305mm) liquid crystal displays, comprising a pair of flight displays and a single central multifunction display, along with traditional control yokes for the two pilots. An alphanumeric keypad is used to interact with the flight management system, communications and navigation radios. The aircraft is provisioned a Garmin GFC700 digital three-axis autopilot that has dual-channel "fail passive" functionality with roll, pitch and yaw control as well as automatic pitch trim and Mach trim. To reduce complexity and potential for confusion, mix-mode anti-icing measures were avoided in favour of exclusively using a variable bleed air system to heat both horizontal wings while permitting a safe level of ice to accrete on the vertical stabiliser. Electronic flight bags are available as optional equipment. Later-built examples are equipped with the Prodigy Touch system.

To better accommodate the cruise speed of the Phenom 300, which is noticeably higher than its Phenom 100 predecessor, a movable horizontal stabiliser in a T-tail configuration was adopted. Pilots are able to set different trim positions for this movable tail to best suit take-off and cruise profiles, decreasing the amount of take-off "pull" needed to displace the elevator via the conventional cable and pulley controls, which are also used for the ailerons and rudder. Electrical actuation is used for the flaps, trim tabs, and autopilot operations. To mitigate the aircraft's tendency to Dutch roll, a rudder on the ventral fin acts as a yaw damper. Various avionics improvements have led to new functionality being added to later-built aircraft, such as predictive wind shear awareness, stabilized approach, emergency descent mode (in event of cabin depressurisation) and an in-house runway overrun awareness and alerting system (ROAAS).

== Variants ==
A Phenom 300 taxiing at Scottsdale Airport in Arizona, 2023

Phenom 300
Original EMB-505 model, produced since 2009.

Phenom 300E
In 2018, Embraer launched an upgraded model of Phenom, featuring a redesigned interior, new avionics suite (Garmin-G3000-based Prodigy Touch), and a Ground Power Mode for the engines.

2020 Phenom 300E
An upgraded Phenom 300E was announced in 2020, featuring upgraded PW535E1 engines, with thrust increased to 3,478 lbf (from 3,360 lbf); maximum speed has increased to Mach 0.80 from 0.78 (464 vs. 446 kn), and range increased from 1,992 to 2,010 nmi (3,689 to 3,723 km; 2,292 to 2,313 mi). Avionics improvements include predictive wind shear awareness, stabilized approach, and an Embraer-developed runway overrun awareness and alerting system (ROAAS). In addition, Bossa Nova interior option became available.

2020 Phenom 300MED
A ready-fit medevac configuration was made available in August 2020 for new-build aircraft. This program also allows existing Phenom 300s to be retrofitted with a medevac interior.

== Operators ==
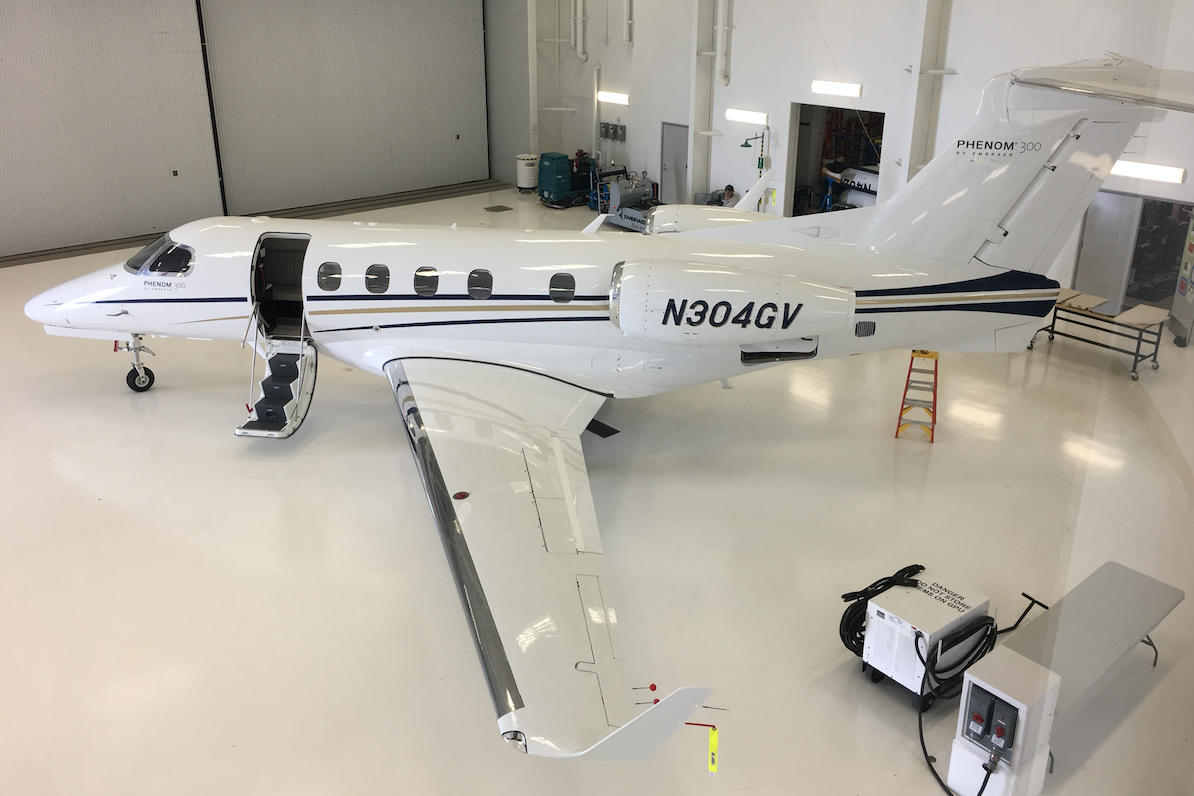
Access to the cabin is via an airstair on the left-hand side

Costa Rica

- Helijet S.A

France

- Evolem Aviation
- Ixair
- JetKey
- Pan Européenne Air Service
- SD Aviation

Germany

- Air Hamburg

Malta

- Luxwing

Portugal

- NetJets Europe

United Kingdom

- Flairjet
- SaxonAir

United States

- Airshare (Executive Flight Services)
- Wheels Up
- Flexjet
- Flight Options
- Grandview Aviation
- JetSuite
- NetJets

Oman

- Royal Oman Police

Australia

- Navair Jet Services

== Deliveries ==
In 2013, the Phenom 300 was the most delivered business jet, with 60 units. It also led the industry in deliveries in 2014 and 2015.

After July 2016, all Phenom assembly was transferred to the Melbourne, Florida line, which has the capability to assemble 96 Phenoms and 72 Embraer Legacy 450/Embraer Legacy 500s annually. More than 170 Phenom jets had been produced at the site by June 2016, mainly for the US market.

In March 2019, Embraer delivered the 500th Phenom 300, claiming more than half of the light jet market share since 2012; at the time it was being used in over 30 countries and had cumulative carried 2.5 million passengers across 600,000 flights and 800,000 hours. As of February 2023, 700 units have been delivered.

Year	2009	2010	2011	2012	2013	2014	2015	2016	2017	2018	2019	2020	2021	2022	2023	2024	2025	2026	Total
Number of deliveries	1	26	42	48	60	73	70	63	54	53	51	50	56	59	63	65	72	55	961

== Accidents and incidents ==
As of January 2023, the Phenom 300 has been involved in three hull-loss accidents causing five fatalities.

- On 10 January 2011, a Phenom 300 operated by the Royal Oman Police registered as A4O-CY made an emergency landing on Muscat International Airport with the right-main landing gear indication not down and locked position, shortly after landing the right main-gear collapsed and subsequently the aircraft banked to the right which caused the right-wing tip to come into contact with the runway surface. All 8 occupants on board survived.
- On 31 July 2015, a Phenom 300, aircraft registration HZ-IBN, crashed into a car park whilst trying to land at Blackbushe Airport in Hampshire. All four persons on board the Saudi-registered private jet died in the crash and subsequent fire.
- On 2 January 2023, Phenom 300 N555NR crashed shortly after takeoff on the grounds of Provo Municipal Airport in Utah. The pilot was killed, one passenger was critically injured, and the two other passengers received minor injuries. On April 24, 2025, the NTSB released the final report on the incident, citing icing conditions present at the time, along with the crew's failure to use available deicing resources, activate onboard anti-icing equipment, and perform the visual inspection of the flight surfaces mandated under the weather conditions as the probable cause of the accident. This led to a nearly immediate aerodynamic stall and left roll on takeoff ending in the uncontrolled impact with the terrain.

== Specifications (Phenom 300E) ==
Data from Embraer Phenom 2020 300E brochure, Aircraft Performance Database

General characteristics

- Crew: 1 or 2 pilots
- Capacity: 6–8 passengers (standard configurations); 10 passengers maximum (with passenger in cockpit, optional side-facing divan, and optional belted lavatory)
- Length: 15.64 m (51 ft 4 in)
- Wingspan: 15.91 m (52 ft 2 in)
- Height: 5.1 m (16 ft 9 in)
- Max takeoff weight: 8,414.59 kg (18,551 lb)
- Fuel capacity: 2,428 kg (5,353 lb)
- Max payload: 1,104 kg (2,434 lb)
- Cabin pressurization: 9.4 psi (0.65 bar; 65 kPa)
- Cabin altitude: 2,012 m (6,600 ft) at 13,716 m (45,000 ft)
- Cabin height: 1.5 m (4.9 ft)
- Cabin width: 1.6 m (5.1 ft)
- Cabin length: 5.23 m (17.2 ft)
- Powerplant: 2 × Pratt & Whitney Canada PW535E1 turbofans, 15.471 kN (3,478 lbf) thrust each

Performance

- Maximum speed: 859 km/h (534 mph, 464 kn) at FL330
- Cruise speed: 839 km/h (521 mph, 453 kn)
- Range: 3,723 km (2,313 mi, 2,010 nmi) with IFR reserves, 5 occupants
- Service ceiling: 13,716 m (45,000 ft)
- Time to altitude: FL 450 in 24 minutes
- Wing loading: 286 kg/m^{2} (59 lb/sq ft)
- Fuel burn: 346 kg/h (760 lb/h) at 364 kn (674 km/h; 419 mph), 456 kg/h (1,010 lb/h) at 431 kn (798 km/h; 496 mph) and FL410
- Take-off distance: 978 m (3,209 ft) MTOW, SL, ISA
- Landing distance: 674 m (2,212 ft) 4 occupants at 200 lb each, NBAA IFR reserves, SL, ISA

Avionics

- Embraer Prodigy Touch (based on Garmin G3000 system)

== See also ==
Related development

- Embraer Phenom 100

Aircraft of comparable role, configuration, and era

- Cessna CitationJet/M2
- Cessna Citation V
- Hawker 400
- Pilatus PC-24
- Beechcraft Premier I
- Grob G180 SPn
