= Gavião Peixoto =

- Municipality
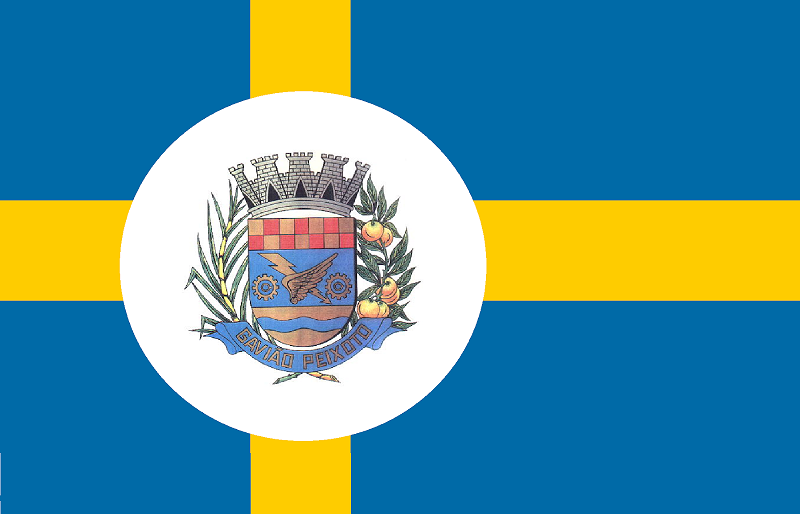
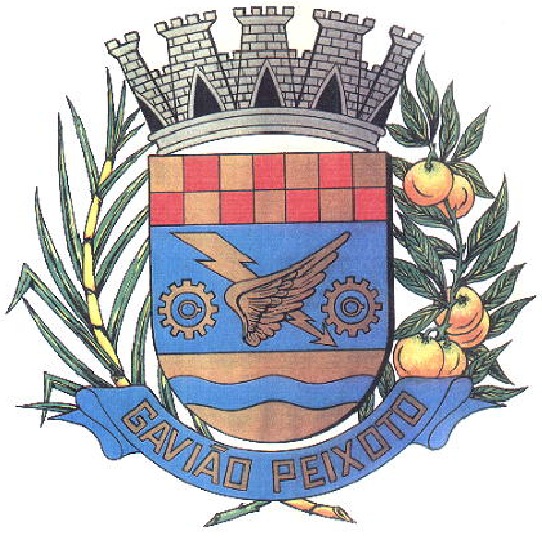
- Flag Coat of arms

- Location in São Paulo state

- Location in Brazil
- Coordinates: 21°50′20″S 48°29′42″W
- Country: Brazil
- Region: Southeast
- State: São Paulo
- Mesoregion: Araraquara
- Microregion: Araraquara

Government
  - Mayor: Gustavo Martins Piccolo

Area
  - Total: 244 km^{2} (94 sq mi)
- Elevation: 515 m (1,690 ft)

Population (2020)
  - Total: 4,815
  - Density: 19.7/km^{2} (51.1/sq mi)
- Time zone: UTC−3 (BRT)
- Website: www.gaviaopeixoto.sp.gov.br

Gavião Peixoto is a municipality in the state of São Paulo in Brazil. The population is 4,815 (2020 est.) in an area of 244 km^{2} (94 sq mi). The elevation is 515 m.

The Brazilian aircraft manufacturer Embraer has a production plant at Gavião Peixoto Aerodrome, where major components are manufactured and flight testing is conducted. The Aerodrome has the longest runway in the Americas and fourth longest in the world.

== Media ==
In telecommunications, the city was served by Telecomunicações de São Paulo. In July 1998, this company was acquired by Telefónica, which adopted the Vivo brand in 2012. The company is currently an operator of cell phones, fixed lines, internet (fiber optics/4G) and television (satellite and cable).

== See also ==
- List of municipalities in São Paulo
- Interior of São Paulo
