= Bombardier Challenger 300 =

Business jet made by Bombardier Aviation

Challenger 300/350
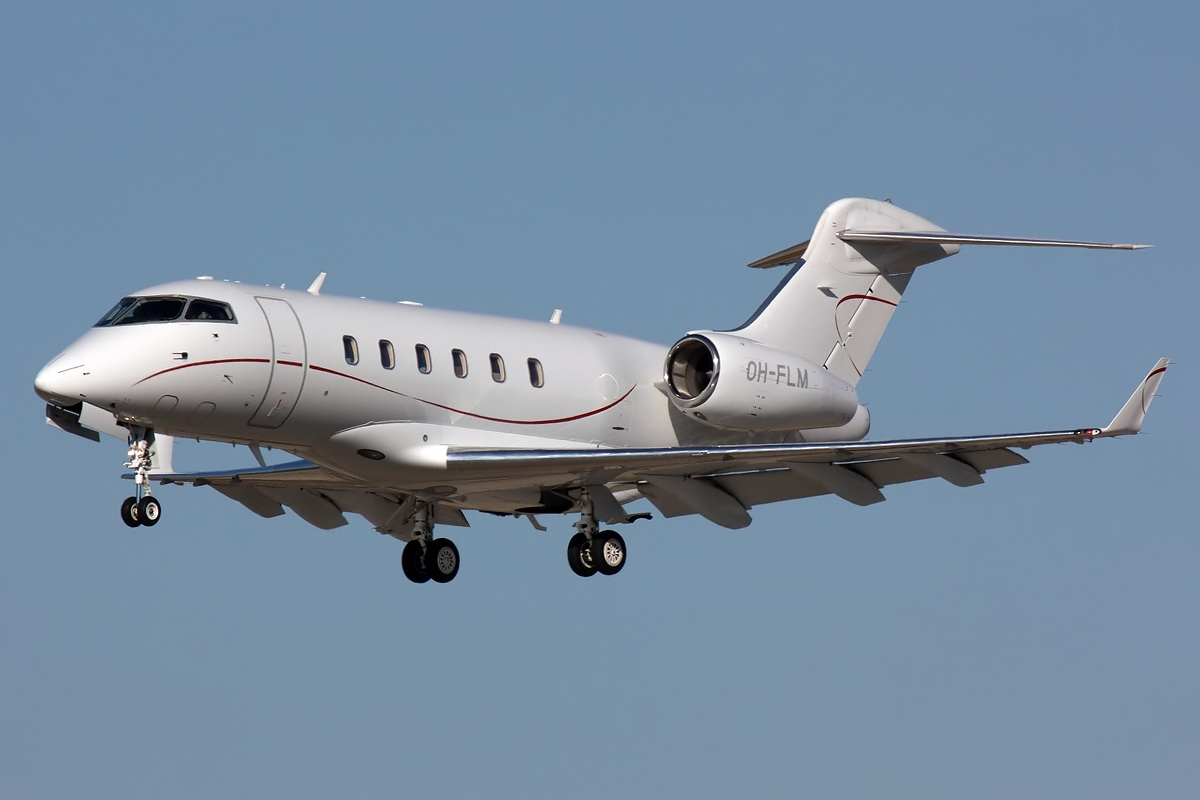

General information
- Type: Business jet
- National origin: Canada
- Manufacturer: Bombardier Aviation
- Status: In production
- Primary users: Flexjet XOJET; NetJets; VistaJet
- Number built: ~450 Challenger 300; 350 Challenger 350 (July 2020)

History
- Manufactured: 2001–present
- Introduction date: 8 January 2004
- First flight: 14 August 2001

The Bombardier Challenger 300 is a 3,100-nautical-mile (5,700 km; 3,600 mi) range super mid-sized business jet designed and produced by the Canadian aircraft manufacturer Bombardier Aviation.

Development of the aircraft, originally called the Bombardier Continental, began during the late 1990s and was formally launched at the 1999 Paris Air Show. The baseline Challenger 300 performed its maiden flight on 14 August 2001 and received its Canadian type approval on 31 May 2003; it commenced commercial operations on 8 January 2004. The majority of sales were to North American-based entities. During the late 2010s, the price of the Challenger 300/350 was lowered substantially to better compete against rivals such as the Embraer Legacy 500.

Improved models of the Challenger 300 have been developed. The Challenger 350, a slightly improved 3,200 nmi (5,900 km; 3,700 mi) range variant, made its first flight on 2 March 2013 and was approved on 11 June 2014. During September 2021, Bombardier launched the Challenger 3500, featuring auto-throttles and an upgraded cabin. By July 2020, around 450 Challenger 300s, and 350 Challenger 350s had reportedly been delivered.

== Development ==
=== Challenger 300 ===
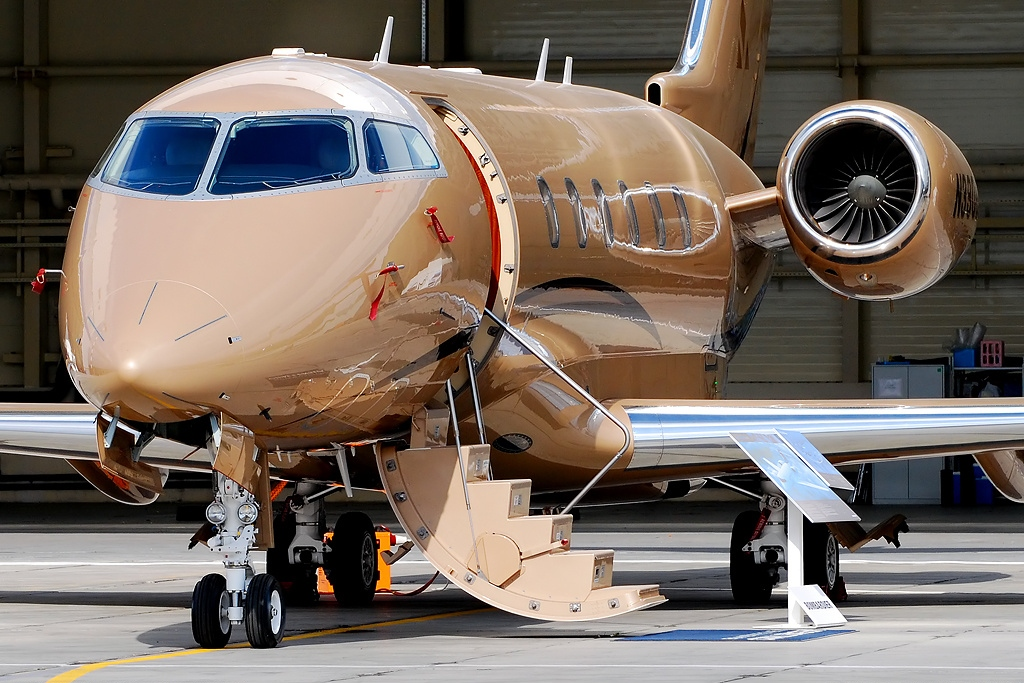
Closeup: nose, stairs open, engines

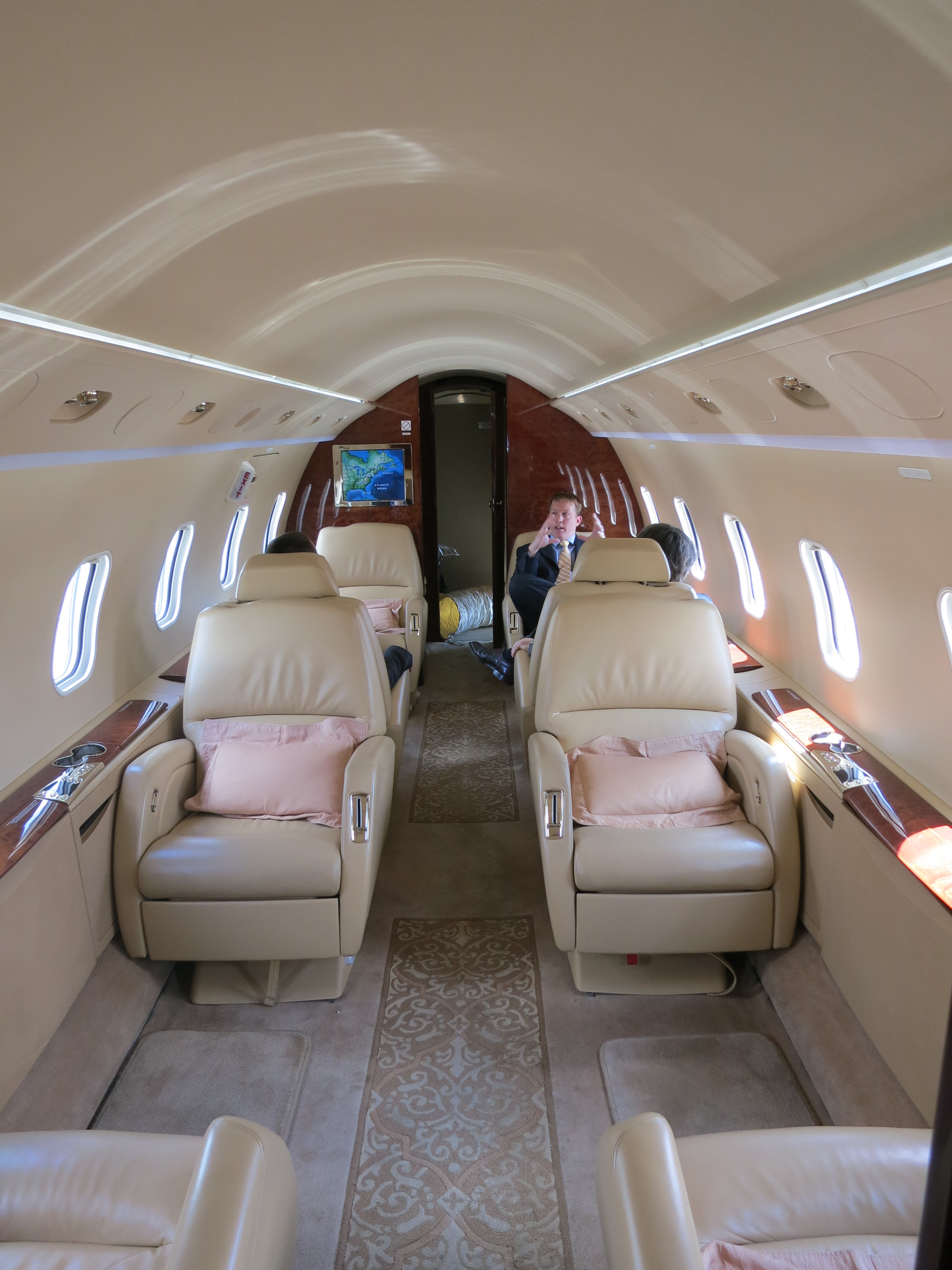
Passenger cabin

During the late 1990s, Bombardier Aerospace decided to embark on the development of a super mid-sized business jet that would be positioned between its existing Learjet 60 and the Challenger 604. Market research had reportedly indicated that in excess of 1,000 new generation super mid-size business jets would be sold by 2012 and the company forecast that the new aircraft could secure one-third of this market. Early on, it was sized to accommodate eight passenger as well as to cover a distance of 5,740km (3,100nm) while cruising at a speed of Mach 0.8. It was a clean-sheet design, having not been developed from either the Challenger 600 or its variants.

In late 1998 and early 1999, various key suppliers, such as Rockwell Collins and AlliedSignal, the former providing its Pro Line 21 integrated avionics system and the latter producing the AS907 turbofan engine selected to power the type, agreed on terms for their involvement in the project. Mitsubishi Heavy Industries opted to become a risk-sharing partner in the business jet's production, as well as being appointed to design, manufacture, and integrate the business jet's new single-piece wing. Taiwan's Aerospace Industrial Development Corporation (AIDC) was selected to supply the aft fuselage and empennage for the new aircraft. Simultaneously, Bombardier's sale team set about securing commitments from prospective customers ahead of the programme's actual launch.

The baseline Challenger 300 was formally launched at the 1999 Paris Air Show, being initially referred to as the Bombardier Continental. Type certification and the first deliveries both originally scheduled to take place during 2002. In November 1999, it was announced that the programme was proceeding ahead of schedule, having reached its first production milestone that same month; final assembly was performed in Montreal, Quebec. Around this time, Bombardier was also reportedly considering launching a regional jet model of the aircraft as well.

In early March 2000, the company stated that 54 orders had been secured for the Challenger 300 since its launch. Even in early 2001, Bombardier was anticipating the aircraft's entry to service during the following year. However, delays were encountered that year, some of which can be attributed to the AS900 engine, which itself was not certified as quickly as had been expected.

On 14 August 2001, the first prototype performed its maiden flight; two months later, the second prototype joined the flight test programme. During September 2002, it was announced that the entry to service date had been pushed back so that design modifications could be implemented. On 31 May 2003, it received Transport Canada's approval, followed on 4 June by US FAR 25 certification and on 31 July by European JAR 25 approval.

=== Challenger 350 ===
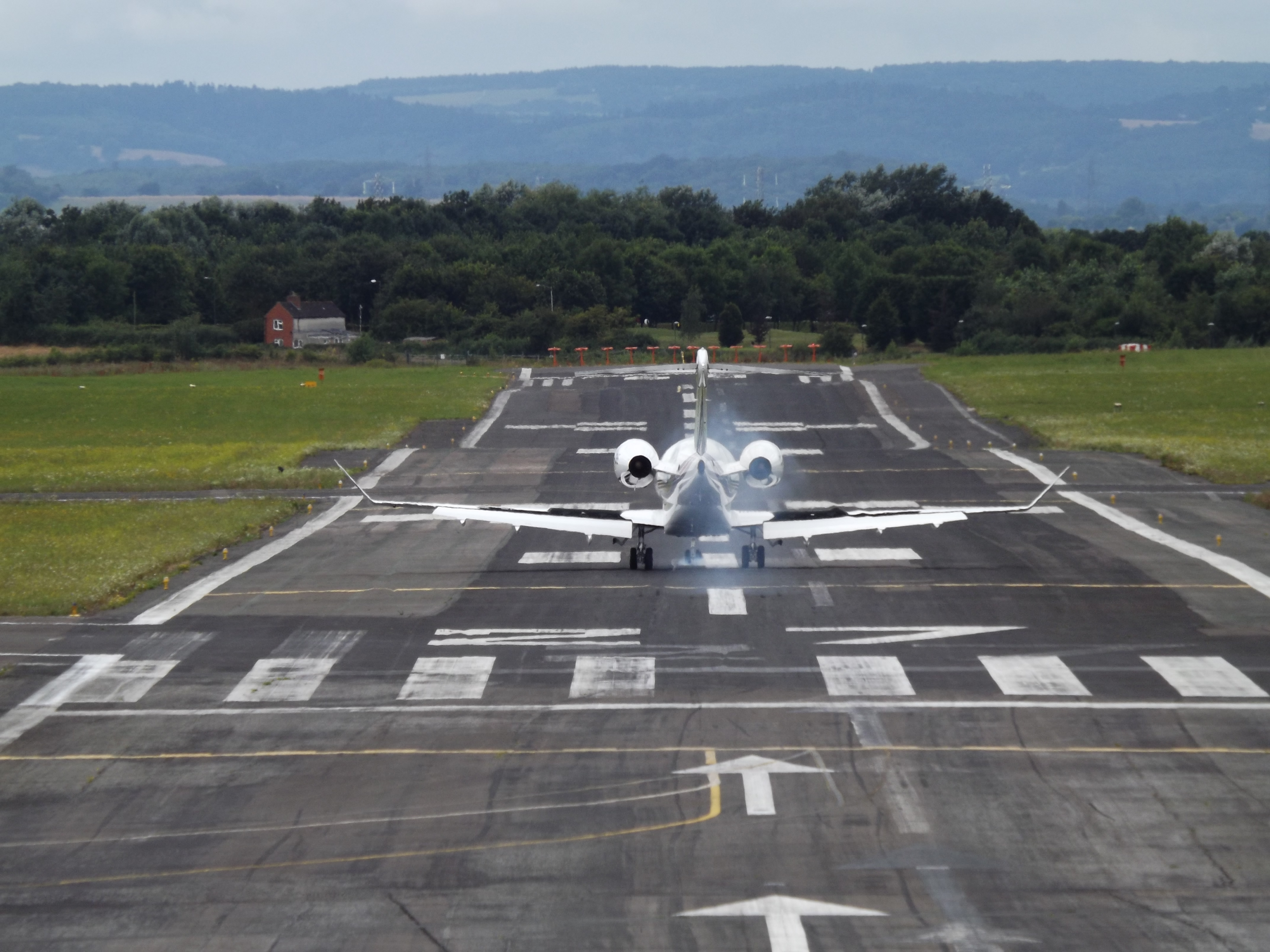
The 350's main external difference is its canted winglets.

The improved variant first flew on 2 March 2013, was unveiled at the next May EBACE and was due to enter service in May 2014. Combined with a more luxurious interior and 20% taller cabin windows, it costs $1 million more at $25.9 million. Its launch customer, NetJets, ordered 75 firm and 125 options. It received its type certification from Transport Canada on 11 June 2014, from the FAA on 25 June, and from the EASA on 2 September. During 2018, 60 Challenger 350s were delivered as Bombardier claimed a 58% market share of the super mid-size segment, and the 300th delivery was reached in July 2019, after five years of service.

Hot-section modifications and a FADEC push gave the Honeywell HTF7350 7.3% more takeoff thrust at 7,323 lbf (32.57 kN) with the same flat rating, durability and reliability. A strengthened wing with canted winglets and more span allows for 900 lb (410 kg) more full fuel payload. Canted winglets have a less acute angle that reduces transonic drag and enlarge the span by 5.2 ft (1.6 m), increasing wing area and aspect ratio. At a weight of 30,200 lb (13,700 kg) it cruises at Mach 0.80 / 455 kn (843 km/h) TAS and is advertised as burning 1,535 lb (696 kg) per hour.

In 2014, Bombardier's maintenance program for the type was priced at $277 per hour; inspections are performed at 600 hour intervals. The avionics include four Adaptive LCD Displays, Dual FMS with LPV and RNP approaches capability, SVS, a MultiScan, Weather Radar, Dual IRS, dual SBAS GPS, integrated EFIS and dual VHF and HF radios. It is able to carry eight passengers over a 3,200 nmi / 5,926 km range at a Mach 0.80 (459 kn, 849 km/h) long-range cruise. It is manufactured in Canada.

=== Challenger 3500 ===
Bombardier unveiled the Challenger 3500 at an event in Montreal on 14 September 2021. The 3500 is a development of the Challenger 300/350, and will feature various improvements, including auto- throttles and an upgraded cabin. The new name will also bring the Challenger 3500 inline with Bombardier's Global nomenclature. Bombardier anticipates deliveries of the Challenger 3500 the second half of 2022 and will carry a price tag of $26.7 million, which is the same as the current Challenger 350. During 2023, the advertised price of a new-build Challenger 3500 was $27.2M.

== Design ==
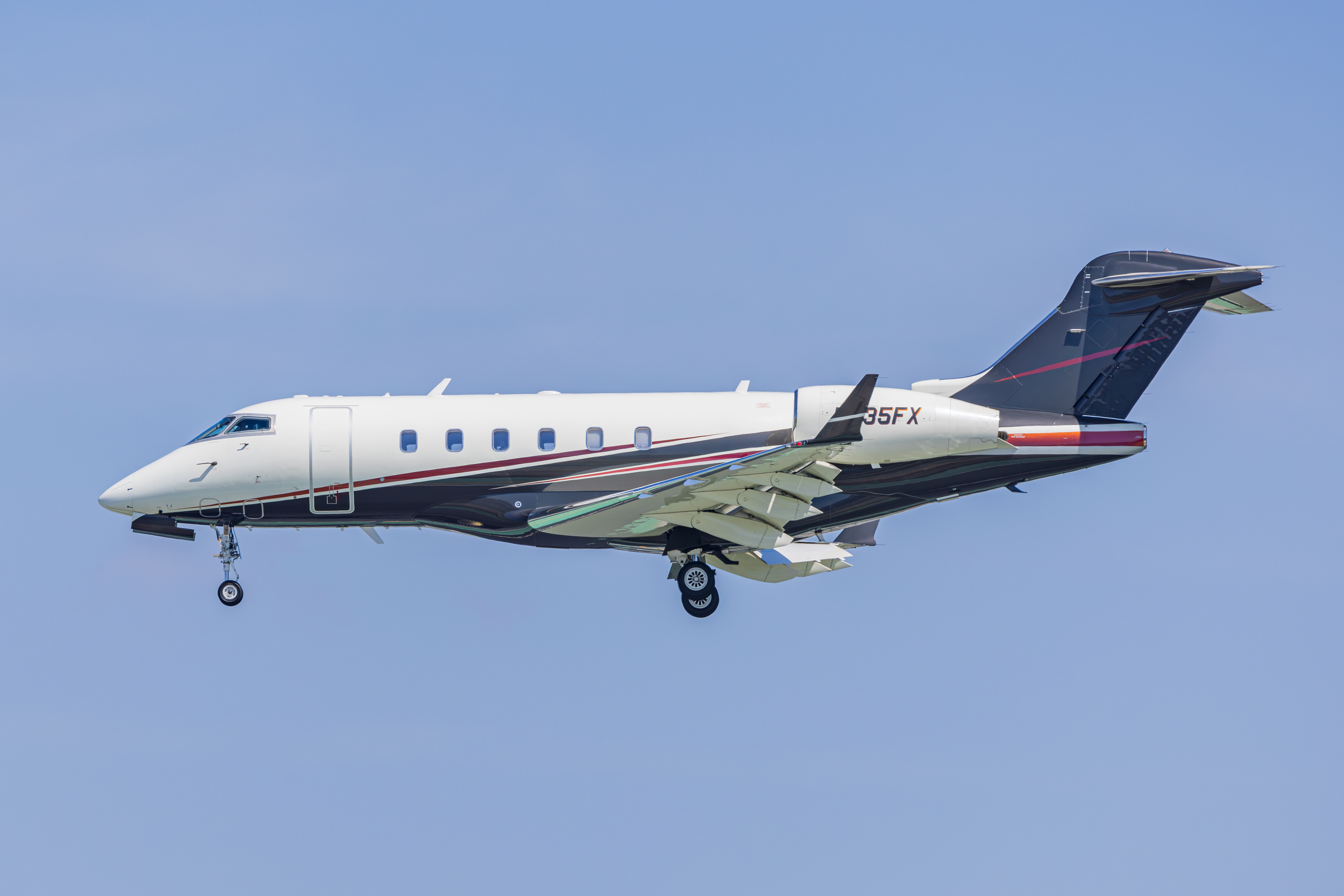
A Challenger 300 on approach with the gear down and the single-slotted Fowler flaps extended

The Bombardier Challenger 300 is a super mid-sized business jet. It is capable of flying across the continental United States in a single hop; specifically, the aircraft is able to climb to FL410 within 18 minutes with a 455 kg (1,003 lb) fuel burn at MTOW/ISA, where at a 14,330 kg (31,590 lb) weight it burns 680 kg (1,500 lb)/h at Mach 0.8/445 kn (824 km/h) TAS, 875 kg (1,929 lb)/h at Mach 0.83/465 kn (861 km/h) TAS.

While both the Challenger 300 and Challenger 350 retain the same sized cabin, the latter is outfitted with a more modern and streamlined interior. All seats are berthable, and in some configurations can be aligned to form beds. A Lufthansa Technik-supplied cabin management system and in-flight entertainment system, along with amenities such as electrical sockets, USB ports, and wireless connectivity, is present on some aircraft. Various optional features can be fitted within the cabin, such as three-place divan, an extra belted seat in the lavatory. The Challenger 350 is equipped with a pocket door between the galley and cabin, increasing privacy and minimising noise. Both the galley and lavatory can be furnished with stone, marble, or wood flooring.

Both the fuselage and wing are semi-monocoque aluminum structures, while the winglets are composed of composite materials. It is outfitted with supercritical wings that have a fixed leading edge and a 27% sweep angle and 1.15 m (3.8 ft) winglets that reduce cruise lift-induced drag by 17%. The wing is equipped with spoilers controlled via a fly-by-wire system: the outboard, multi-function spoilers act as spoilerons, augmenting roll control and operating together in flight to dump lift and act as speedbrakes, while all outboard and inboard spoiler panels deploy together to act as ground spoilers, dumping lift on the ground. The hydraulically-acutated single-slotted fowler flaps have four positions: 0/10/20/30°. The outboard ailerons are manually actuated while both the elevators and rudder are hydraulically-powered with a mechanical backup.

The flight deck of the aircraft is provisioned with Rockwell Collins Pro Line 21 avionics include four LCD displays, an EICAS and Maintenance Diagnostics Computer, an EGPWS, a TCAS II and an ELT. On the Challenger 350, the primary flight display (PFD) fills the full width with the attitude directional indicator (ADI) symbology and synthetic vision system (SVS) imagery. The flight controls use cables and pulleys for the most part. Rockwell Collins's digital MultiScan radar system is present, featuring ground-clutter suppression and auto-tilt and -gain. Nosewheel steering, achieved via a tiller, provides 70 degrees turning authority to either left or right.

== Operational history ==
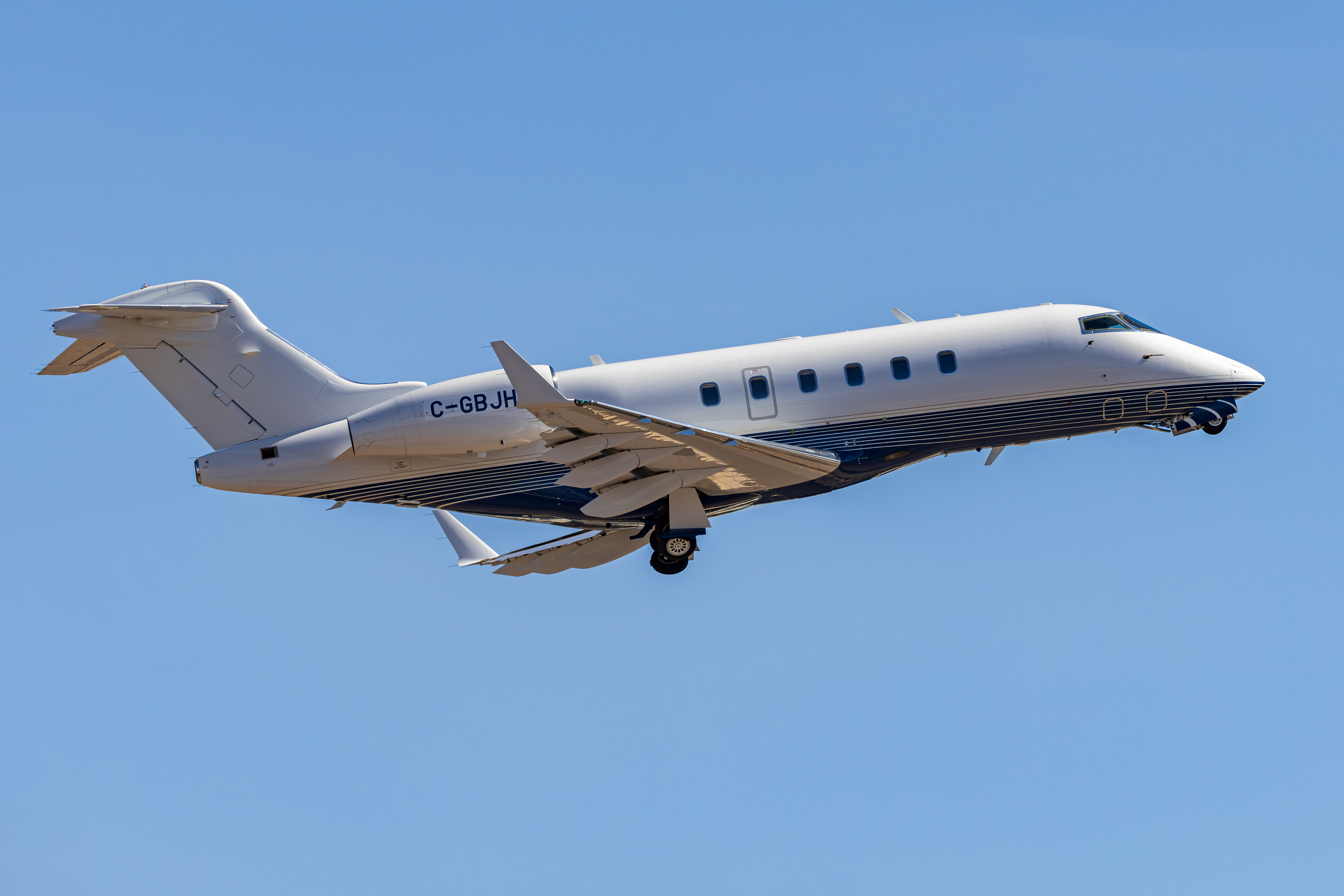
Bombardier Challenger 300, 2023

The Challenger 300 entered commercial service on 8 January 2004 with Flexjet.

In 2004, the unit cost of the Challenger 300 was US$17.4 million.

By November 2014, 448 Challenger 300s were in service and, over nearly one million hours of operations, had achieved a 99.79% dispatch reliability rate; five-year-old aircraft retain 64% of their original value. At the end of 2015, 550 Challenger 300/350 were operational; of these, 402 aircraft were in North America, 75 in Western Europe, 37 in Latin America, 12 in Eastern Europe, seven in India, six in Africa and China, four in Asia Pacific and one in the Middle East; the largest operator was Flexjet with 30 Challenger 300s and seven 350s, then Netjets with 26 delivered, including four to Netjets Europe.

During 2017, in response to competitive pressures, Bombardier chose to discount the price of the Challenger 300/350 by $7 million to match the Embraer Legacy 500's $20 million price. Over 200 Challenger 350 were delivered by December 2017, adding to around 450 Challenger 300 deliveries. The 350th Challenger 350 was delivered in July 2020.

By the 2020s, second-hand Challenger 300s typically cost from $7 million to over $20 million. During 2021, Bombardier's list price for a new Challenger 350 was $26.7M.

During 2022, the United States Federal Aviation Administration (FAA) ordered pilots to perform additional safety checks on the model after "multiple incidents" in which a horizontal stabilizer malfunctioned. In 2023, a passenger was killed by blunt force trauma in a Challenger 300 inflicted when a series of automated pilot instructions resulted in the stabilizer control system being turned off, causing the aircraft to pitch violently. On December 18, 2024, a Bombardier Challenger 300 with tail number LV-GOK, flying from Punta del Este, Uruguay landed in San Fernando Airport, Buenos Aires, Argentina, went off course and crashed into a neighboring house, completely destroying the plane. Both crew members died as a consequence of the fire. No other people were on board.

== Specifications ==
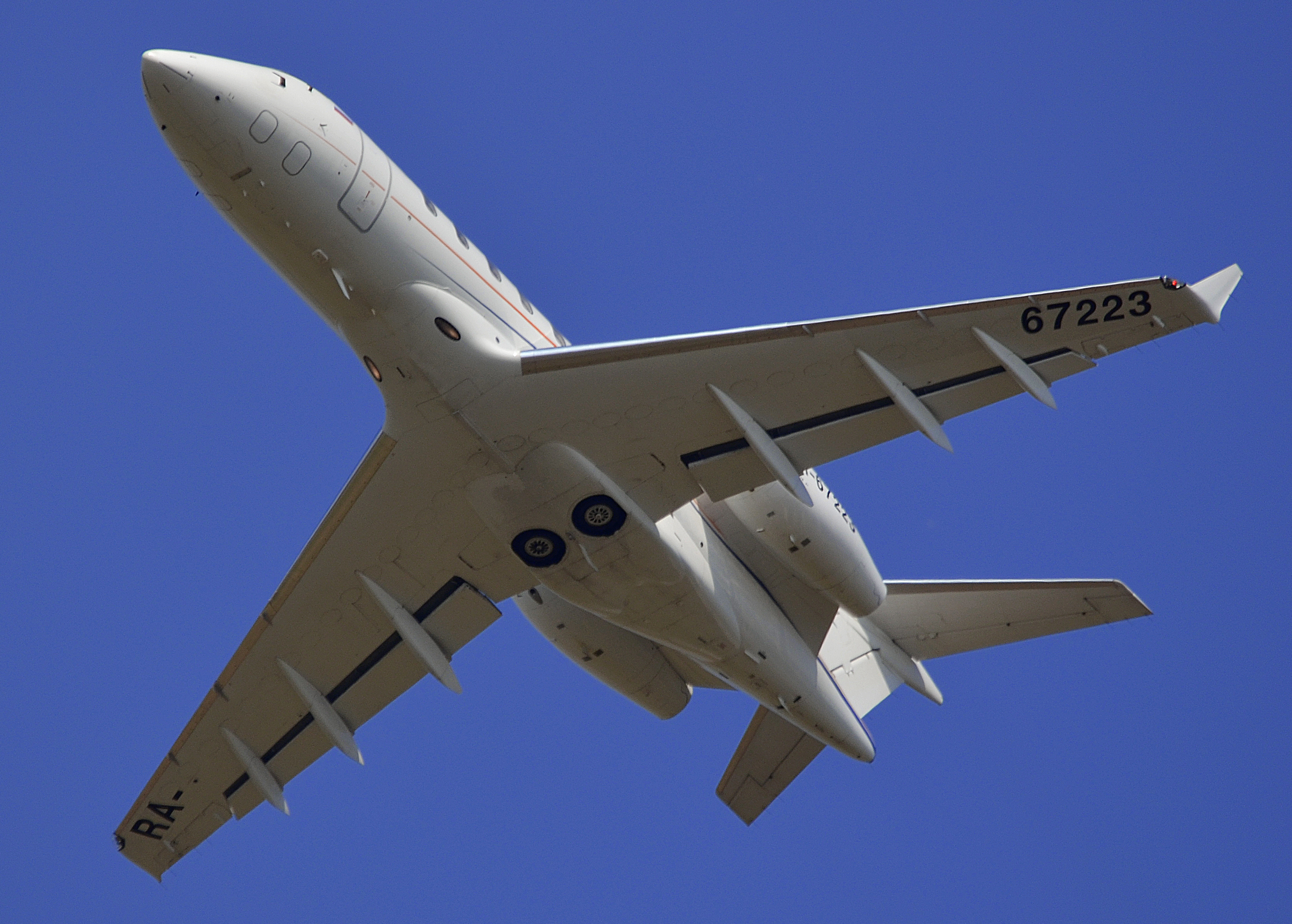
A Challenger 300 seen from below, with gear retracted, wheels apparent, and swept wing

Variant	Challenger 300	Challenger 350
Cockpit crew	Min 2 (Pilot and Co-Pilot)	
Capacity	Max 19 occupants (including the crew and no more than 16 passengers). Typically 8 or 9 max passenger seating capacity with standard cabin layout options.	
Length	68.63 ft (20.92 m)	
Span	63 ft 10 in (19.46 m)	69 ft (21 m)
Height	20 ft 4 in (6.2 m)	20 ft (6.1 m)
Wing area	523 sq ft (48.5 m^{2})	
Aspect ratio	7.81	9.09
MTOW	38,850 lb (17,622 kg)	40,600 lb (18,416 kg)
OEW	23,500 lb (10,659 kg)	24,800 lb (11,249 kg)
Fuel capacity	14,150 lb (6,418 kg)	
Maximum payload	3,500 lb (1,588 kg)	3,400 lb (1,542 kg)
Wing loading	74.3 lb/ft^{2} (363.3 kg/m^{2})	77.6 lb/ft^{2} (379.7 kg/m^{2})
Turbofans (2×)	Honeywell HTF7000	Honeywell HTF7350
Thrust (Note: ISA + 15°C flat rated)	6,826 lbf (30.4 kN)	7,323 lbf (33 kN)
Maximum speed	Mach 0.83 (477 kn; 883 km/h; 549 mph)	
Cruise speed	Mach 0.80 (459 kn; 850 km/h; 528 mph)	
Range (Note: ISA, LRC, 8 pax 2 crew)	3,100 nmi (5,741 km; 3,567 mi)	3,200 nmi (5,926 km; 3,682 mi)
Ceiling	45,000 ft (13,716 m)	
Takeoff (Note: SL, ISA, MTOW)	4,810 ft (1,466 m)	4,835 ft (1,474 m)
Landing (Note: SL, ISA, MLW)	2,600 ft (792 m)	2,710 ft (826 m)

== See also ==
Related development

- Challenger 600
- Challenger 850

Aircraft of comparable role, configuration, and era

- Cessna Citation X
- Cessna Citation Longitude
- Dassault Falcon 2000
- Embraer Legacy 450/500 and Praetor 500/600
- Embraer Legacy 600 / 650
- Gulfstream G280
- Hawker 4000
