= Vista =

Vista may refer to:

== Software ==
- Windows Vista, the line of Microsoft Windows client operating systems released in 2007
- VistA, (Veterans Health Information Systems and Technology Architecture) a medical records system of the United States Department of Veterans Affairs and others worldwide
- VISTA (comparative genomics), software tools for genome analysis and genomic sequence comparisons
- VistaPro, and Vista, 3D landscape generation software for the Amiga and PC
- VIsualizing STructures And Sequences, bioinformatics software

== Organizations and institutions ==
- Vista Group, a New Zealand software company specializing in solutions for the cinema industry
- AmeriCorps VISTA, originally Volunteers in Service to America, a national anti-poverty service program
- Ventura Intercity Service Transit Authority, a public transportation agency in Ventura County, California, US
- Vista Community College, now Berkeley City College, a community college in Berkeley, California, US
- Vista Federal Credit Union, now merged with Partners Federal Credit Union, a credit union that serves employees of The Walt Disney Company
- Vista University, a now-closed South African university
- Vista Equity Partners
- Vista Oil & Gas, an oil and gas company founded by Miguel Galuccio
- Vista Outdoor, an American-based publicly traded outdoor and shooting sports company
- Vista Global, a UAE-based private aviation group
- VistaJet, a Malta-based business aviation company

== Places ==
- Vista, California, United States
- Playa Vista, Los Angeles, United States
- Vista, Manitoba, Canada
- Vista, Minnesota, United States
- Vista, Missouri, United States
- Vista, New York, United States
- Vista, South Australia, Australia
- Isla Vista, California, United States
- La Vista, Nebraska, United States
- Mount Vista, Washington, United States
- Vista Center, New Jersey, United States
- Vista Tower (Chicago), United States
- Vista West, Wyoming, United States
- Vista (Hong Kong)

== Vehicles ==
- Aeroprakt A-20 Vista, ultralight aircraft
- Eagle Vista, a rebadged Mitsubishi Mirage sold under the Eagle brand from 1988–1992
- Mitsubishi Chariot, also known as Dodge / Plymouth Colt Vista Wagon, a compact MPV
- NF-16D VISTA, a variant of the Lockheed Martin F-16 fighter aircraft range with thrust vector control
- Oldsmobile Vista Cruiser, a station wagon produced by Oldsmobile until 1977
- Thomas Vista, a school bus produced by Thomas Built Buses until 1998
- Toyota Vista, a passenger car produced by Toyota until 2003
- Indica Vista, a passenger car produced by Tata Motors
- Vista-class cruise ship (2002), a class of Panamax-type cruise ships
- Vista-class cruise ship (2016), a class of cruise ships operated by the Carnival Cruise Lines

== Other ==
- Sightline (architecture) or vista, in architecture and urban planning
- Terminating vista, a building or monument that stands at the end or in the middle of a road
- VISTA (protein), an immune checkpoint protein that inhibits immune responses
- Vista (song), the debut song and the debut single by K-pop girl group, Fiestar
- Vista, a cape from the web serial Worm
- Vista (Middle-earth), a part of the atmosphere that surrounds the world of Arda in the fiction of J. R. R. Tolkien
- VISTA (telescope), Visible and Infrared Survey Telescope for Astronomy
- Vista (Hong Kong), a private residential building in Hong Kong
- "VISTA", a song by P-MODEL from the album P-MODEL
- Vista Magazine, a bilingual English-Spanish periodical published by ImpreMedia
- The Vista (part of UCentral), the student newspaper of the University of Central Oklahoma
- Vista (Marion Brown album), 1975
- Vista (Sam Rivers, Adam Rudolph, and Harris Eisenstadt album), 2004
- Vista (typeface), a type face cut by Baltimore Type Foundry
- The Vista, formerly Music City Mall and Vista Ridge Mall, a shopping mall in Lewisville, Texas, United States

== See also ==
- AltaVista, an Internet search engine
- Buena Vista (disambiguation)
- Natalia Boa Vista, a character in CSI: Miami
- Vistas (disambiguation)
- VistaVision, a 35mm motion picture film format
- VSTA (disambiguation)
