= JetSmarter =

Mobile marketplace for private jet users

JetSmarter Inc.
- Type: Private
- Industry: Transportation, aviation, technology
- Founded: November 2012
- Founders: Sergey Petrossov
- Headquarters: Fort Lauderdale, Florida, United States
- Area served: Worldwide
- Key people: Sergey Petrossov (CEO)
- Services: Mobile application, flight sharing, aircraft for hire
- Website: jetsmarter.com

JetSmarter was a corporation and mobile application for private jet users. The company was headquartered in Fort Lauderdale, Florida, United States. The app connected users to available aircraft and routes in the United States, Europe and Middle East. The company was purchased by Vista Global in 2019 and merged into a new brand, XO.

== History ==
JetSmarter was founded in 2012 by entrepreneur Sergey Petrossov, whose idea made him one of Forbes' "30 Under 30" business leaders of 2016. In August 2012, the beta version was launched and tested among a closed group of private aviation users. After testing proved successful, Petrossov sought and received substantial venture funding to expand JetSmarter's scope. In March 2013, the JetSmarter app was launched and made available to the general public on both iOS and Android devices.

In June 2015, JetSmarter announced its new European headquarters in Zurich, Switzerland. In early 2016, it launched flights within Europe. JetSmarter had offices in Zurich, London, Moscow, Dubai, Riyadh, and Fort Lauderdale.

On April 10, 2019, Dubai-based Vista Global said it had made an agreement to acquire JetSmarter adding it to its aviation portfolio, which includes VistaJet and XOJET. Vista said it would maintain JetSmarter's office in Ft. Lauderdale where its digital team was based.

On June 27, 2019, Vista Global announced it had combined JetSmarter with its XOJET subsidiary rebranding the combined entity as XO, powered by JetSmarter technology.

== Funding ==
According to Business Insider and TechCrunch, JetSmarter raised $20 million from the Saudi Royal Family, American rapper Jay-Z, American serial entrepreneur and investor Wayne Chang, and Goldman Sachs Alternatives.

In December 2016, JetSmarter announced it had raised an additional $105 million at a $1.6 billion valuation. The company said this would fuel international expansion and add at least 80 more routes to its existing 50 routes.

== Services ==
JetSmarter flight services included a mix of shared and private flights:

- Seats on existing jetpooling flights.
- On-demand shared flights.
- On-demand private flights.
- Helicopter transfers in select cities.
- Empty-leg flight deals, or repositioning flights.

JetSmarter claimed to offer 3,000 private jets and 2,000 free empty legs per month. In January 2016, Chicago Tribune reported that JetSmarter had launched app-based private charter service in Chicago, using Midway International Airport as its access point. Adding to its services, the company offered helicopter transfers in select cities.

In May 2018, JetSmarter announced it would have a fleet of 20 JetSmarter branded aircraft by the end of the year. The aircraft would be managed and operated by JetEdge, a Part 135 operator. It also said it had eliminated free shuttles and for new members, it had eliminated free flights under three hours. The company also said it was providing integration via SAP Concur to attract more corporate travel business.

== Partnership ==
JetSmarter partnered with various air carriers that span the range of the private charter industry. Partnerships included Pernod Ricard, Vertis Aviation, and SportStar Relocation. The company also partnered with Jet Edge and Air Hamburg to cater to its global community of private jet fliers.

== Corporate affairs ==
In 2017, The Verge reported that management of JetSmarter offered free flights to its reporters if an article was posted within five days of the flight. According to the reporter if the story did not appear within that timeline, the reporter's credit card would be charged $2,000.

On February 16, 2017, the President of Jetsmarter, Gennady Barsky, resigned after he was arrested at the Broward Financial Center, site of the company's headquarters. He was charged with five counts of grand theft by embezzlement by authorities in Contra Costa, California.

In January 2019, CNBC aired an investigative report on JetSmarter, stating that "JetSmarter tried to be the Uber of private jets, now it faces lawsuits and losses". CNBC also published a letter from JetSmarter's general counsel attempting to quash its investigation. The report included a video of a flight that was diverted by a passenger making terroristic threats.

== Key people ==
=== Sergey Petrossov ===
Sergey Petrossov
- Born: July 1988 (age 38); Moscow, Russia
- Citizenship: American
- Education: University of Florida
- Occupation: Businessman
- Known for: Founder of aviation technology company JetSmarter and integration with XO

Sergey Petrossov is an American entrepreneur of Armenian descent, known for founding JetSmarter. He then held executive roles at Vista Global related to their acquisition of JetSmarter and integration with XO.

==== Early life and rducation ====
Petrossov was born in Moscow, Russia. He moved to the United States at the age of 4. He spent time living in California, Colorado, and Florida. Petrossov attended the University of Florida in Gainesville, Florida, studying business and finance.

==== Career ====
In 2009 Petrossov co-founded the Federal System of Distance Education shortly after graduating. The company developed cloud-based software for schools and universities.

In 2012 Petrossov launched JetSmarter, which enabled people across the globe to book trips on private jets using its mobile app. Petrossov was inspired to launch the start-up after his first trip on a private plane in 2009, during which he found the process difficult and outdated. In 2017, JetSmarter was valued at $1.5 billion and had institutional investor backing by Clearlake Capital and Jefferies Financial Group.

In 2019, JetSmarter was acquired by Vista Global. Petrossov then served as President of XO and Chief Growth & Digital Officer of Vista Global after the acquisition.
