= Sergey Petrossov =

American entrepreneur

- Born: June 7, 1988
- Citizenship: American
- Education: University of Florida
- Occupation: Businessman
- Known for: Founder of aviation technology company JetSmarter and integration with XO

Sergey Petrossov is an American entrepreneur of Armenian descent, known for founding JetSmarter, a private aviation technology company. He then held executive roles at Vista Global related to their acquisition of JetSmarter and integration with XO.

== Early life and education ==
Petrossov moved to the United States at the age of 4. He spent time living in California, Colorado, and Florida. Petrossov attended the University of Florida in Gainesville, Florida, studying business and finance.

== Career ==
In 2009 Petrossov co-founded the Federal System of Distance Education shortly after graduating. The company developed cloud-based software for schools and universities.

In 2012 Petrossov launched JetSmarter, which enabled people across the globe to book trips on private jets using its mobile app. Petrossov was inspired to launch the start-up after his first trip on a private plane in 2009, during which he found the process difficult and outdated. In 2017, JetSmarter was valued at $1.5 billion and had institutional investor backing by Clearlake Capital and Jefferies Financial Group.

In 2019, JetSmarter was acquired by Vista Global. Petrossov then served as President of XO and Chief Growth & Digital Officer of Vista Global after the acquisition.

In September of 2025, Petrossov joined Aero Ventures as a managing partner.
