= AF Corse =

Auto racing team

(Italy) AF Corse
- Founded: 1995
- Base: Piacenza
- Team principal(s): Amato Ferrari
- Current series: FIA World Endurance Championship; GT World Challenge Europe; European Le Mans Series; IMSA WeatherTech SportsCar Championship; Asian Le Mans Series; International GT Open; British GT Championship
- Former series: Italian Superturismo Championship; FIA GT Championship; FIA GT1 World Championship; World Series Formula V8 3.5 (as Spirit of Race/SMP Racing); DTM
- Current drivers: FIA World Endurance Championship; Hypercar; 50. (Italy) Antonio Fuoco (Spain) Miguel Molina (Denmark) Nicklas Nielsen; 51. (United Kingdom) James Calado (Italy) Antonio Giovinazzi (Italy) Alessandro Pier Guidi; 83. (Poland) Robert Kubica (United Kingdom) Phil Hanson (China) Yifei Ye; LMGT3; 21. (France) François Hériau (United States) Simon Mann (Italy) Alessio Rovera; 54. (Italy) Francesco Castellacci (Switzerland) Thomas Flohr (Italy) Davide Rigon
- Teams' Championships: 2006, 2007, 2008, 2009 FIA GT2, 2011 ILMC LM GTE-Pro, 2012, 2013, 2014, 2017 FIA WEC GTE-Pro, 2020, 2024 GTWC Endurance, 2021 DTM.
- Drivers' Championships: 2006, 2007, 2008 FIA GT2, 2011 FIA GT3, 2013, 2014, 2017 FIA WEC GTE-Pro, 2020, 2024 GTWC Endurance
- Website: https://afcorse.it/

AF Corse (/eɪ ɛf ˈkɔːrsə/ AY-ef KOR-suh) is an Italian auto racing team founded by former racing driver Amato Ferrari in 1995 in Piacenza. Strongly linked to the Maserati and Ferrari brands, AF Corse currently competes in the FIA World Endurance Championship, GT World Challenge Europe, European Le Mans Series, Asian Le Mans Series, and International GT Open, and are four-time champions of the GT2 class of the former FIA GT Championship. The team has also entered cars under Advanced Engineering, AT Racing, PeCom Racing, Spirit of Race, Formula Racing, 8Star Motorsports and MR Racing, and in association with Michael Waltrip Racing (AF Waltrip).

== History ==
In 1995, Amato Ferrari (no relation to the family of Enzo Ferrari and his Ferrari car company) retired from driving and chose to concentrate on team management, initially entering the Italian Superturismo Championship. Following the series' demise in 1999, Ferrari launched a new team known as AF Corse (in English, "AF Racing"), named for his initials. The team turned to sports car racing, and within a year was contracted by Maserati. AF Corse was tasked with the development, maintenance, and transport of the Trofeo Cup, a one-make series based on the Maserati Coupé. The company would continue in this position until 2005.

During 2004, Maserati approached AF Corse about running their latest development in sports car racing: the new Maserati MC12 for the international FIA GT Championship. The team aided Maserati in testing and developing the car before running the two new racers in their home event at Imola. Drivers Fabrizio de Simone, Andrea Bertolini, Mika Salo, and Johnny Herbert were all assigned to the team, eventually earning AF Corse two victories before the season ended. Once the development of the MC12 was satisfied, the company returned to running the Trofeo Cup, as well as running a Maserati Light in the 2005 Italian GT Championship.

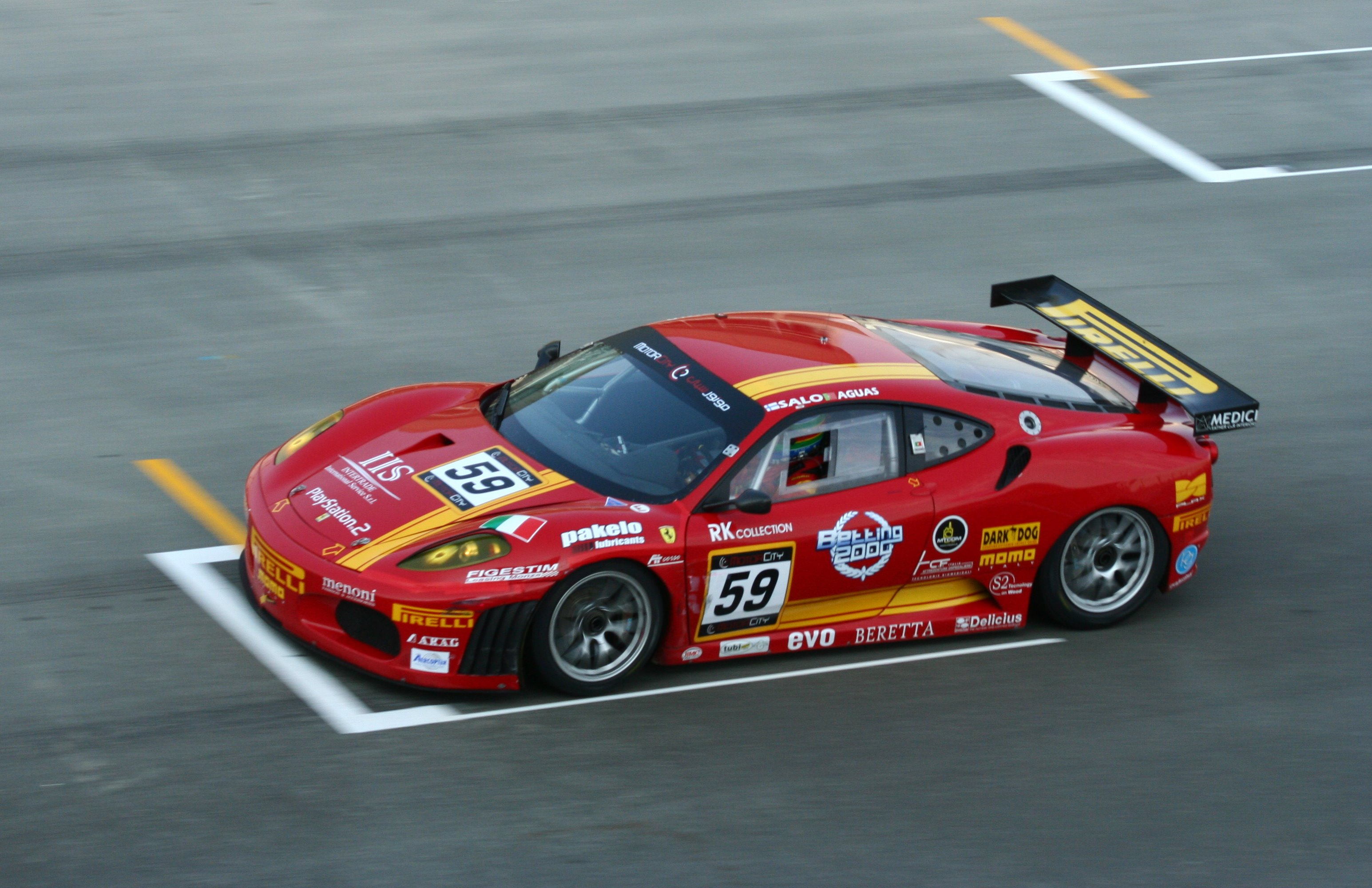
One of AF Corse's Ferrari F430 GT2s.

AF Corse returned to the FIA GT Championship in 2006. This time however they would be running the latest Ferrari offering, the Ferrari F430, as well as competing in the series' lower category, the GT2 class. Salo was retained in the driving line-up, while newcomers Rui Águas, Jaime Melo, and Matteo Bobbi completed the standard line-up. Victory was earned in the team's debut at Silverstone, and another two were earned over the season, including at the Spa 24 Hours. AF Corse won the class championship, beating fellow Ferrari competitor Scuderia Ecosse. The company retained their connection to Maserati however, entering a trio of cars in the new FIA GT3 European Championship.

As defending champions, AF Corse remained in the FIA GT Championship in 2007, although much on the team changed. While the Ferrari F430s remained, all new drivers were introduced to the team. Dirk Müller, Toni Vilander, Gianmaria Bruni, and Stephane Ortelli took over driving duties for the season, while Motorola announced their full sponsorship of the squad. The two cars dominated the 2007 season, winning nine of the ten events on the schedule and wrapping up another championship.

For 2008, AF Corse expanded to a three car team in the GT2 class. Vilander and Bruni are retained in the lead car, while Biagi returns to the squad to be joined by Christian Montanari in the second entry. The third car will be run under the Advanced Engineering name, with Argentinian Matías Russo and Luís Pérez Companc.

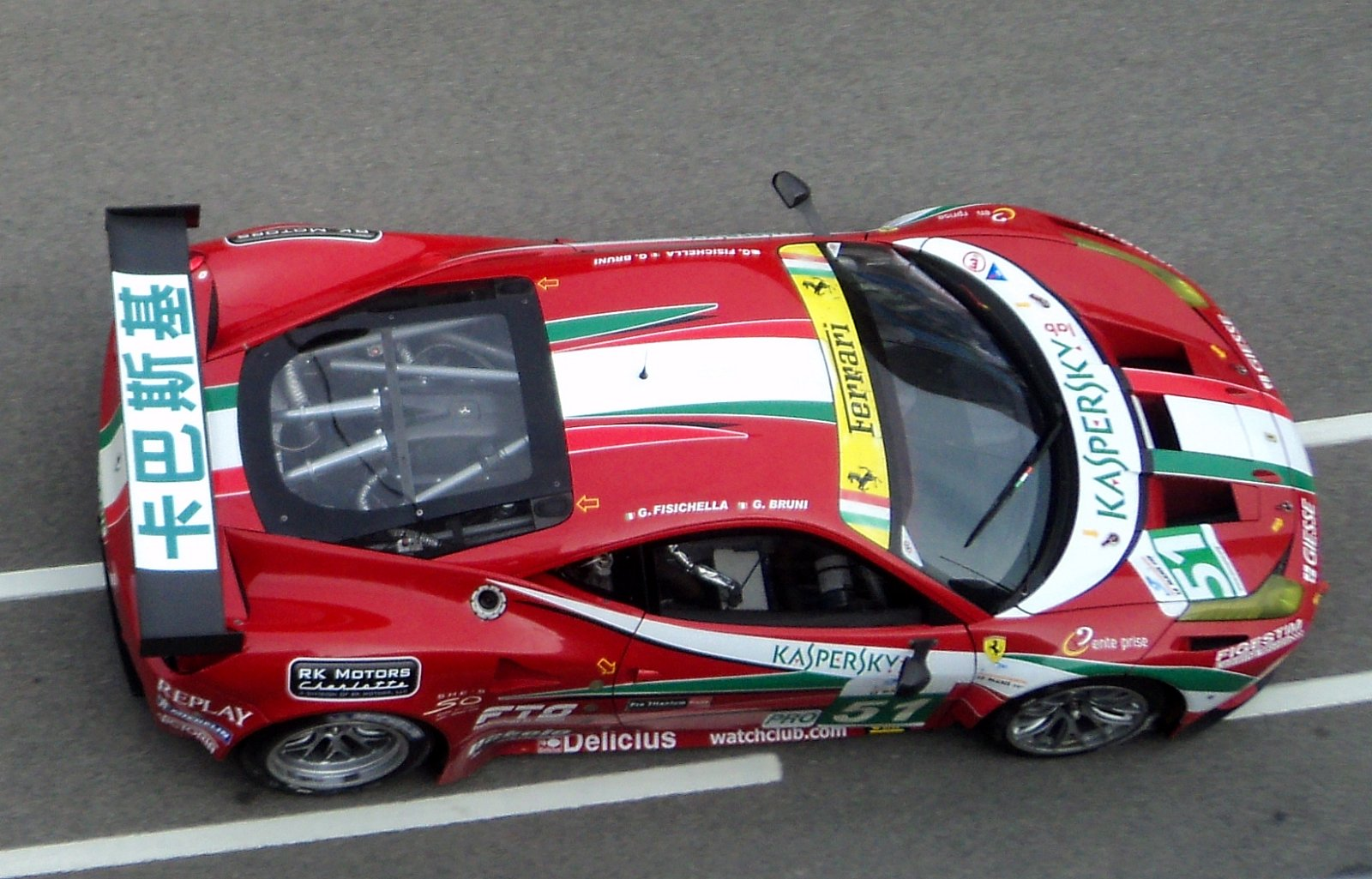
AF Corse's Ferrari 458 Italia GT2 at Zhuhai International Circuit.

In 2010, the FIA GT Championship was dissolved and two new championships were born from it. The GT1 class of the former series became the FIA GT1 World Championship while the GT2 class formed the FIA GT2 European Championship. The GT2 series was suspended due to lack of entries. As a result, the AF Corse team joined the Le Mans Series. For the 2010 season, the team fielded three Ferrari F430 GT2s for the series' GT2 class. Drivers Matías Russo and Luís Pérez Companc campaigned the #94 Ferrari with Toni Vilander and former Grand Prix drivers Jean Alesi and Giancarlo Fisichella in the #95. ALMS regulars, with the Risi Competizione team, Jaime Melo and Gianmaria Bruni drove the Ferrari #96.

In 2011 AF Corse entered the Intercontinental Le Mans Cup with brand new Ferrari 458 Italia GT2s as well as the FIA GT3 European Championship with Ferrari 458 Italia GT3s. AF Corse won the ILMC in the GTE-Pro category, including the final round at Petit Le Mans. It also won the FIA GT3 driver's championship with Francisco Catellaci and Federico Leo.

The team also joined the International GT Open for the 2010 season in the Super GT class, which is largely reminiscent of the GT2 rules in the Le Mans Series. The team fields two Ferrari GT2 cars for drivers Jack Gerber & Rui Águas in the #6 car and Pierre Kaffer and Álvaro Barba in the #8 Ferrari. AF Corse will also field a third Ferrari (#7) for the AT Racing team with drivers Alexander Talkanitsa and his son Alexander Talkanitsa Jr.

For 2012, AF Corse competed in a variety of sports car championships throughout Europe and globally, including the FIA World Endurance Championship and GT1 World Championship with Ferrari F458 Italia GT2s and Ferrari F458 Italia GT3s, including a co-branded for GTE-Am class car with Michael Waltrip Racing, AF Waltrip. At the 24 Hours of Le Mans, amateur driver Piergiuseppe Perazzini collided with the No. 8 Toyota driven by overall-contender Anthony Davidson, sending the Toyota airborne at the Mulsanne Corner. Perazzini's Ferrari also flipped and landed on its roof after hitting the tyre barrier. Davidson suffered two broken vertebrae in the crash but was able to pull himself from the car in the immediate aftermath of the accident - though of course he was forced to abandon the race. The AF Corse #51 car driven by Gianmaria Bruni, Giancarlo Fisichella and Toni Vilander won the GTE Pro race beating Corvette, Porsche and Aston Martin.

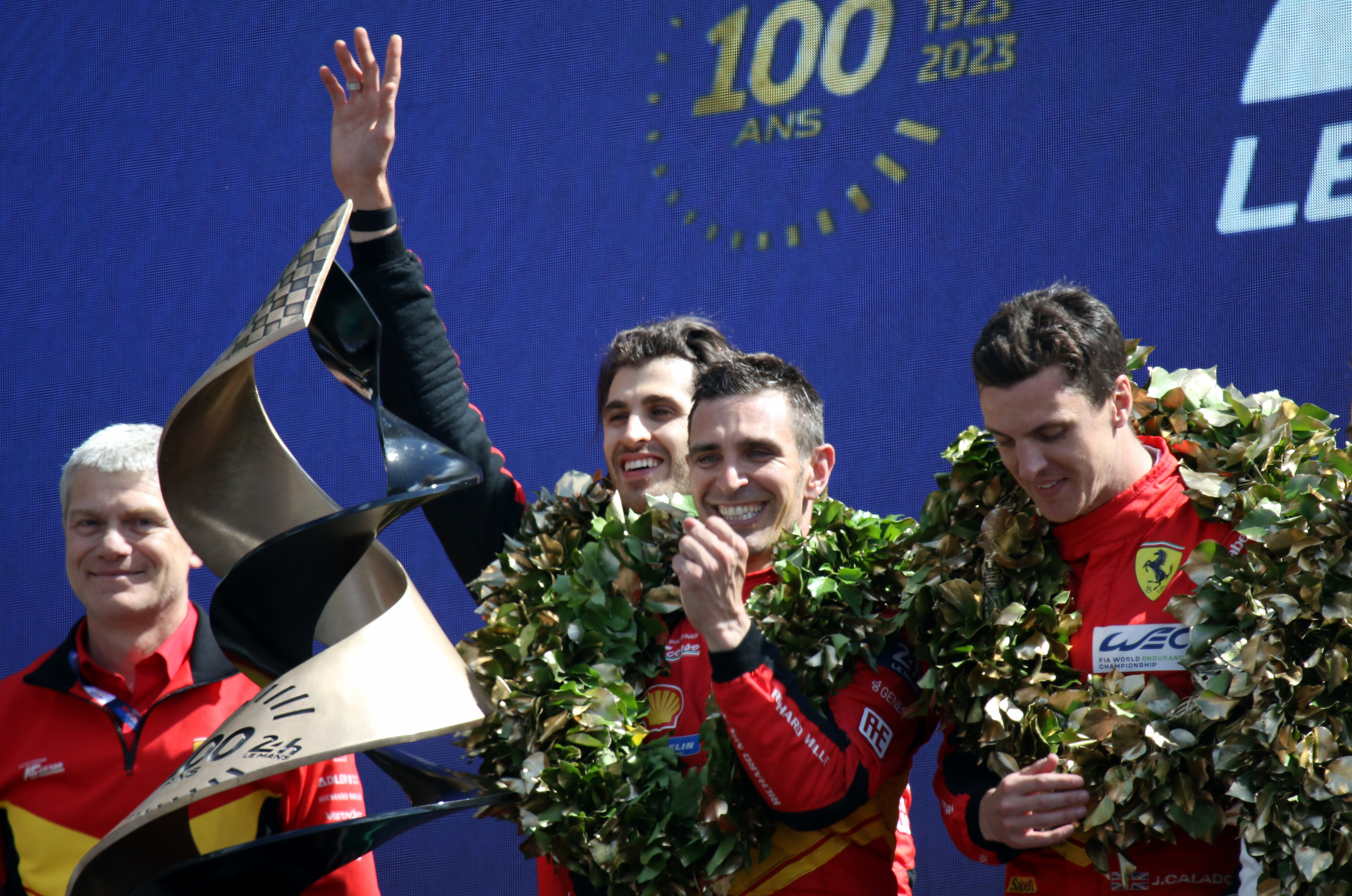
The winning No. 51 Ferrari 499P drivers, Antonio Giovinazzi, Alessandro Pier Guidi & James Calado on the podium at the 2023 24 Hours of Le Mans.

In 2023, AF Corse and Scuderia Ferrari announced a partnership to field the marque's new 499P hypercar in that year's edition of the FIA World Endurance Championship. After a successful season that year, including winning at Le Mans in the centenary edition – and Ferrari's first Le Mans in the top class in 50 years – the team decided to field a yellow-coloured privateer entry, and drafted in Robert Kubica, Robert Shwartzman and Yifei Ye to pilot the #83 machine. They led much of the 2024 edition of Le Mans, before retiring with a motor–generator unit fault. In the 2025 Le Mans 24h, the yellow #83 won, while #51 and #50 were beaten by one of the Porsche 963 which are built according to slightly different rules (LMDh), and running not only in the WEC, but also in North American IMSA series.

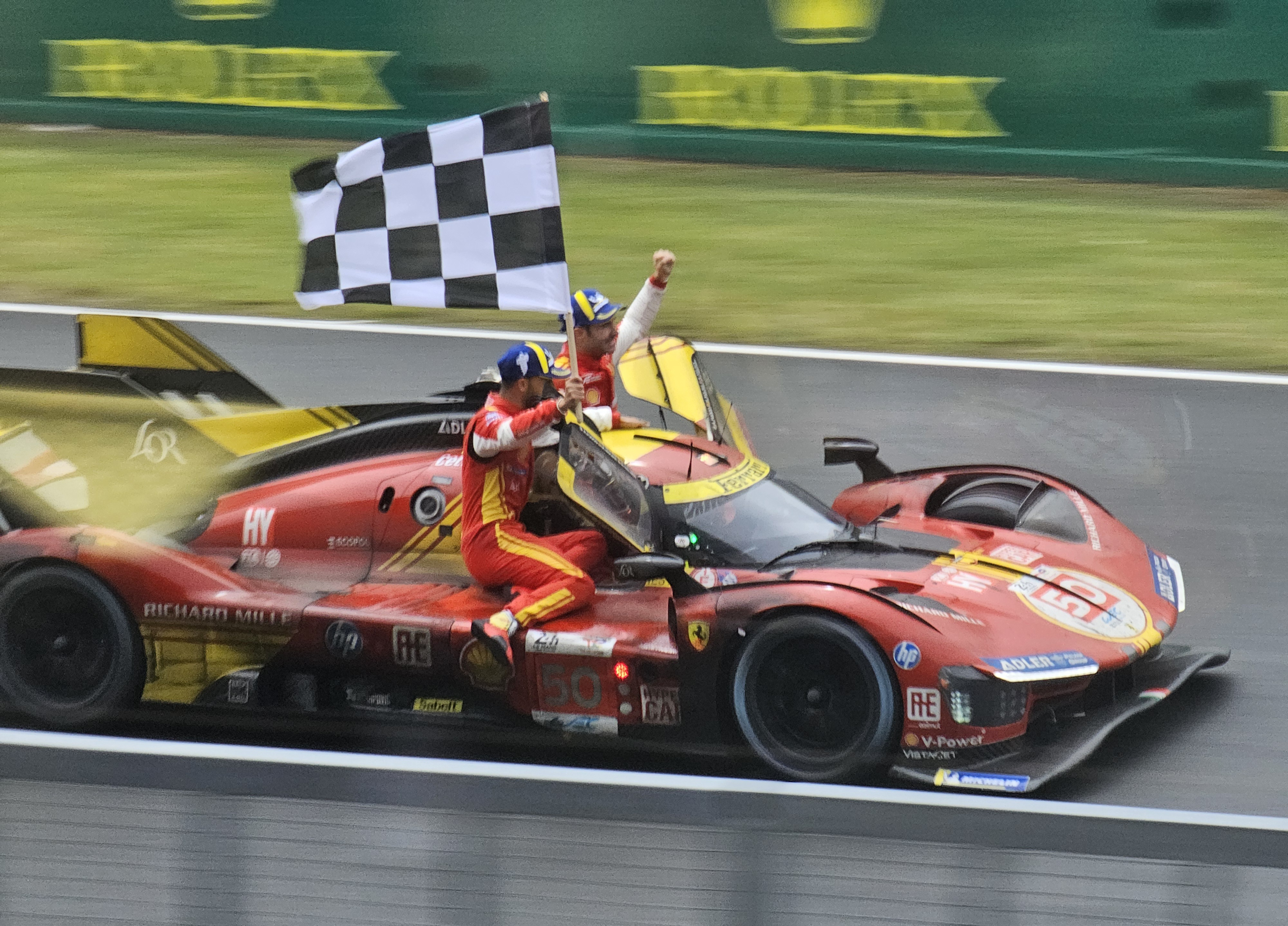
The No. 50 Ferrari 499P being driven towards the pit lane exit after winning the 2024 24 Hours of Le Mans.

The collaboration with the Ferrari Hypercar team has largely been a success, at Le Mans in particular, with each of the three cars (#51, #50, #83) winning the marquee event from 2023 to 2025. This threepeat means that all nine of their works drivers, mostly unchanged across the years, have won the race: Antonio Fuoco, Miguel Molina and Nicklas Nielsen in car #50, and Alessandro Pier Guidi, James Calado and Antonio Giovinazzi in car #51, and Robert Kubica, Yifei Ye and Phil Hanson in car #83.

== Results ==
=== 24 Hours of Le Mans ===
Year	Entrant	No.	Car	Drivers	Class	Laps	Pos.	Class Pos.
2007	(Italy) AF Corse (United Kingdom) Aucott Racing	78	Ferrari F430 GT2	(United Kingdom) Ben Aucott (United Kingdom) Joe Macari (United Kingdom) Adrian Newey	LMGT2	308	22nd	4th
2008	(Italy) AF Corse	78	Ferrari F430 GT2	(Italy) Thomas Biagi (San Marino) Christian Montanari (Finland) Toni Vilander	LMGT2	111	DNF	DNF
2009	(Italy) AF Corse	78	Ferrari F430 GT2	(Italy) Gianmaria Bruni (Argentina) Luis Pérez Companc (Argentina) Matías Russo	LMGT2	317	26th	6th
2009	(Italy) Advanced Engineering (United States) Team Seattle	81	Ferrari F430 GT2	(United States) Patrick Dempsey (United States) Joe Foster (United States) Don Kitch Jr.	LMGT2	301	30th	9th
2010	(Italy) AF Corse SRL	95	Ferrari F430 GT2	(France) Jean Alesi (Italy) Giancarlo Fisichella (Finland) Toni Vilander	LMGT2	323	16th	4th
2010	(Italy) AF Corse SRL	96	Ferrari F430 GT2	(Argentina) Luis Pérez Companc (Argentina) Matías Russo (Finland) Mika Salo	LMGT2	0	WD	WD
2011	(Argentina) PeCom Racing	49	Lola B11/40-Judd	(Germany) Pierre Kaffer (Argentina) Luis Pérez Companc (Argentina) Matías Russo	LMP2	139	DNF	DNF
2011	(Italy) AF Corse	71	Ferrari 458 Italia GT2	(Portugal) Rui Águas (United States) Robert Kauffman (United States) Michael Waltrip	LMGTE Pro	178	DNF	DNF
2011	(Italy) AF Corse SRL	51	Ferrari 458 Italia GT2	(Italy) Gianmaria Bruni (Italy) Giancarlo Fisichella (Finland) Toni Vilander	LMGTE Pro	314	13th	2nd
2011	(Italy) AF Corse SRL	61	Ferrari F430 GT2	(Republic of Ireland) Seán Paul Breslin (Italy) Marco Cioci (Italy) Piergiuseppe Perazzini	LMGTE Am	188	DNF	DNF
2012	(Argentina) PeCom Racing	49	Oreca 03-Nissan	(France) Soheil Ayari (Germany) Pierre Kaffer (Argentina) Luis Pérez Companc	LMP2	352	9th	3rd
2012	(Italy) AF Corse	51	Ferrari 458 Italia GT2	(Italy) Gianmaria Bruni (Italy) Giancarlo Fisichella (Finland) Toni Vilander	LMGTE Pro	336	17th	1st
2012	(Italy) AF Corse	71	Ferrari 458 Italia GT2	(Monaco) Olivier Beretta (Italy) Andrea Bertolini (Italy) Marco Cioci	LMGTE Pro	326	22nd	4th
2012	(Italy) AF Corse	81	Ferrari 458 Italia GT2	(Italy) Niki Cadei (Republic of Ireland) Matt Griffin (Italy) Piergiuseppe Perazzini	LMGTE Am	70	DNF	DNF
2012	(Italy) AF Corse-Waltrip	61	Ferrari 458 Italia GT2	(Portugal) Rui Águas (United States) Robert Kauffman (United States) Brian Vickers	LMGTE Am	294	31st	6th
2013	(Argentina) PeCom Racing	49	Oreca 03-Nissan	(Germany) Pierre Kaffer (France) Nicolas Minassian (Argentina) Luis Pérez Companc	LMP2	325	10th	4th
2013	(Italy) AF Corse	51	Ferrari 458 Italia GT2	(Italy) Gianmaria Bruni (Italy) Giancarlo Fisichella (Italy) Matteo Malucelli	LMGTE Pro	311	21st	6th
2013	(Italy) AF Corse	71	Ferrari 458 Italia GT2	(Monaco) Olivier Beretta (Japan) Kamui Kobayashi (Finland) Toni Vilander	LMGTE Pro	312	20th	5th
2013	(Italy) AF Corse	54	Ferrari 458 Italia GT2	(France) Jean-Marc Bachelier (United States) Howard Blank (France) Yannick Mallégol	LMGTE Am	147	DNF	DNF
2013	(Italy) AF Corse	55	Ferrari 458 Italia GT2	(Italy) Lorenzo Casè (Hong Kong) Darryl O'Young (Italy) Piergiuseppe Perazzini	LMGTE Am	305	26th	2nd
2013	(Italy) AF Corse	61	Ferrari 458 Italia GT2	(Italy) Marco Cioci (South Africa) Jack Gerber (Republic of Ireland) Matt Griffin	LMGTE Am	305	27th	3rd
2013	(United States) 8 Star Motorsports	81	Ferrari 458 Italia GT2	(Portugal) Rui Águas (Australia) Jason Bright (Venezuela) Enzo Potolicchio	LMGTE Am	294	37th	10th
2014	(Russia) SMP Racing	27	Oreca 03R-Nissan	(Russia) Anton Ladygin (Finland) Mika Salo (Russia) Sergey Zlobin	LMP2	303	37th	12th
2014	(Russia) SMP Racing	37	Oreca 03R-Nissan	(Russia) Kirill Ladygin (Italy) Maurizio Mediani (France) Nicolas Minassian	LMP2	9	DNF	DNF
2014	(Russia) SMP Racing	72	Ferrari 458 Italia GT2	(Russia) Aleksey Basov (Italy) Andrea Bertolini (Russia) Viktor Shaytar	LMGTE Am	196	DNF	DNF
2014	(Italy) AF Corse	51	Ferrari 458 Italia GT2	(Italy) Gianmaria Bruni (Italy) Giancarlo Fisichella (Finland) Toni Vilander	LMGTE Pro	339	15th	1st
2014	(Italy) AF Corse	71	Ferrari 458 Italia GT2	(Monaco) Olivier Beretta (Germany) Pierre Kaffer (Note: James Calado was driving the No. 71 AF Corse Ferrari when he was injured in a crash in the second qualifying session. Calado was not cleared to participate in the race and was replaced by Pierre Kaffer.) (Italy) Davide Rigon	LMGTE Pro	28	DNF	DNF
2014	(Italy) AF Corse	60	Ferrari 458 Italia GT2	(Italy) Lorenzo Casè (Italy) Raffaele Giammaria (United States) Peter Mann	LMGTE Am	115	DNF	DNF
2014	(Italy) AF Corse	61	Ferrari 458 Italia GT2	(Italy) Marco Cioci (Argentina) Luis Pérez Companc (Italy) Mirko Venturi	LMGTE Am	331	22nd	3rd
2014	(Italy) AF Corse	62	Ferrari 458 Italia GT2	(France) Jean-Marc Bachelier (United States) Howard Blank (France) Yannick Mallégol	LMGTE Am	295	38th	14th
2014	(Italy) AF Corse	81	Ferrari 458 Italia GT2	(United Kingdom) Sam Bird (Italy) Michele Rugolo (Australia) Stephen Wyatt	LMGTE Am	22	DNF	DNF
2014	(United States) 8 Star Motorsports	90	Ferrari 458 Italia GT2	(United States) Frankie Montecalvo (Italy) Gianluca Roda (Italy) Paolo Ruberti	LMGTE Am	330	23rd	4th
2015	(Russia) SMP Racing	27	BR Engineering BR01-Nissan	(Russia) David Markozov (Italy) Maurizio Mediani (France) Nicolas Minassian	LMP2	340	14th	6th
2015	(Russia) SMP Racing	37	BR Engineering BR01-Nissan	(Russia) Mikhail Aleshin (Russia) Anton Ladygin (Russia) Kirill Ladygin	LMP2	322	33rd	13th
2015	(Russia) SMP Racing	72	Ferrari 458 Italia GT2	(Russia) Aleksey Basov (Italy) Andrea Bertolini (Russia) Viktor Shaytar	LMGTE Am	332	20th	1st
2015	(Italy) AF Corse	51	Ferrari 458 Italia GT2	(Italy) Gianmaria Bruni (Italy) Giancarlo Fisichella (Finland) Toni Vilander	LMGTE Pro	330	25th	3rd
2015	(Italy) AF Corse	71	Ferrari 458 Italia GT2	(Monaco) Olivier Beretta (United Kingdom) James Calado (Italy) Davide Rigon	LMGTE Pro	332	21st	2nd
2015	(Italy) AF Corse	55	Ferrari 458 Italia GT2	(United Kingdom) Duncan Cameron (Republic of Ireland) Matt Griffin (United Kingdom) Alex Mortimer	LMGTE Am	241	DNF	DNF
2015	(Italy) AF Corse	61	Ferrari 458 Italia GT2	(Italy) Matteo Cressoni (Italy) Raffaele Giammaria (United States) Peter Mann	LMGTE Am	326	31st	5th
2015	(Italy) AF Corse	83	Ferrari 458 Italia GT2	(Portugal) Rui Águas (France) Emmanuel Collard (France) François Perrodo	LMGTE Am	330	26th	4th
2016	(Russia) SMP Racing	27	BR Engineering BR01-Nissan	(Russia) Mikhail Aleshin (Italy) Maurizio Mediani (France) Nicolas Minassian	LMP2	347	11th	7th
2016	(Russia) SMP Racing	37	BR Engineering BR01-Nissan	(Russia) Kirill Ladygin (Russia) Vitaly Petrov (Russia) Viktor Shaytar	LMP2	353	7th	3rd
2016	(Italy) AF Corse	51	Ferrari 488 GTE	(Italy) Gianmaria Bruni (United Kingdom) James Calado (Italy) Alessandro Pier Guidi	LMGTE Pro	179	DNF	DNF
2016	(Italy) AF Corse	71	Ferrari 488 GTE	(Italy) Andrea Bertolini (United Kingdom) Sam Bird (Italy) Davide Rigon	LMGTE Pro	143	DNF	DNF
2016	(Italy) AF Corse	55	Ferrari 458 Italia GT2	(United Kingdom) Duncan Cameron (Republic of Ireland) Matt Griffin (United Kingdom) Aaron Scott	LMGTE Am	289	43rd	11th
2016	(Italy) AF Corse	83	Ferrari 458 Italia GT2	(Portugal) Rui Águas (France) Emmanuel Collard (France) François Perrodo	LMGTE Am	331	27th	2nd
2016	(Denmark) Formula Racing	60	Ferrari 458 Italia GT2	(Denmark) Johnny Laursen (Denmark) Mikkel Mac (Denmark) Christina Nielsen	LMGTE Am	319	35th	6th
2016	(Singapore) Clearwater Racing	61	Ferrari 458 Italia GT2	(United Kingdom) Rob Bell (Malaysia) Weng Sun Mok (Japan) Keita Sawa	LMGTE Am	329	30th	4th
2017	(Italy) AF Corse	51	Ferrari 488 GTE	(United Kingdom) James Calado (Italy) Alessandro Pier Guidi (Italy) Michele Rugolo	LMGTE Pro	312	46th	11th
2017	(Italy) AF Corse	71	Ferrari 488 GTE	(United Kingdom) Sam Bird (Spain) Miguel Molina (Italy) Davide Rigon	LMGTE Pro	339	21st	5th
2017	(Switzerland) Spirit of Race	54	Ferrari 488 GTE	(Monaco) Olivier Beretta (Italy) Francesco Castellacci (Switzerland) Thomas Flohr	LMGTE Am	326	41st	12th
2017	(Switzerland) Spirit of Race	55	Ferrari 488 GTE	(United Kingdom) Duncan Cameron (Italy) Marco Cioci (United Kingdom) Aaron Scott	LMGTE Am	331	28th	2nd
2017	(Singapore) Clearwater Racing	60	Ferrari 488 GTE	(Japan) Hiroki Katoh (Portugal) Álvaro Parente (Singapore) Richard Wee	LMGTE Am	327	40th	11th
2017	(Singapore) Clearwater Racing	61	Ferrari 488 GTE	(Republic of Ireland) Matt Griffin (Malaysia) Weng Sun Mok (Japan) Keita Sawa	LMGTE Am	330	31st	5th
2017	(Hong Kong) DH Racing	83	Ferrari 488 GTE	(Italy) Andrea Bertolini (Sweden) Niclas Jönsson (United States) Tracy Krohn	LMGTE Am	320	42nd	13th
2018	(Philippines) Eurasia Motorsport	44	Ligier JS P217-Gibson	(Italy) Andrea Bertolini (Sweden) Niclas Jönsson (United States) Tracy Krohn	LMP2	334	NC	NC
2018	(Italy) AF Corse	51	Ferrari 488 GTE Evo	(United Kingdom) James Calado (Italy) Alessandro Pier Guidi (Brazil) Daniel Serra	LMGTE Pro	339	22nd	7th
2018	(Italy) AF Corse	52	Ferrari 488 GTE Evo	(Brazil) Pipo Derani (Italy) Antonio Giovinazzi (Finland) Toni Vilander	LMGTE Pro	341	20th	5th
2018	(Italy) AF Corse	71	Ferrari 488 GTE Evo	(United Kingdom) Sam Bird (Spain) Miguel Molina (Italy) Davide Rigon	LMGTE Pro	338	24th	9th
2018	(Switzerland) Spirit of Race	54	Ferrari 488 GTE	(Italy) Francesco Castellacci (Italy) Giancarlo Fisichella (Switzerland) Thomas Flohr	LMGTE Am	335	26th	2nd
2018	(Singapore) Clearwater Racing	61	Ferrari 488 GTE	(Republic of Ireland) Matt Griffin (Malaysia) Weng Sun Mok (Japan) Keita Sawa	LMGTE Am	332	35th	8th
2018	(Japan) MR Racing	70	Ferrari 488 GTE	(Monaco) Olivier Beretta (Italy) Eddie Cheever III (Japan) Motoaki Ishikawa	LMGTE Am	324	38th	9th
2019	(Italy) AF Corse	51	Ferrari 488 GTE Evo	(United Kingdom) James Calado (Italy) Alessandro Pier Guidi (Brazil) Daniel Serra	LMGTE Pro	342	20th	1st
2019	(Italy) AF Corse	71	Ferrari 488 GTE Evo	(United Kingdom) Sam Bird (Spain) Miguel Molina (Italy) Davide Rigon	LMGTE Pro	140	DNF	DNF
2019	(Switzerland) Spirit of Race	54	Ferrari 488 GTE	(Italy) Francesco Castellacci (Italy) Giancarlo Fisichella (Switzerland) Thomas Flohr	LMGTE Am	327	43rd	12th
2019	(Japan) Car Guy Racing	57	Ferrari 488 GTE	(Italy) Kei Cozzolino (Japan) Takeshi Kimura (France) Côme Ledogar	LMGTE Am	332	35th	5th
2019	(Singapore) Clearwater Racing	61	Ferrari 488 GTE	(Italy) Matteo Cressoni (Republic of Ireland) Matt Griffin (Argentina) Luis Pérez Companc	LMGTE Am	331	37th	7th
2019	(Japan) MR Racing	70	Ferrari 488 GTE	(Monaco) Olivier Beretta (Italy) Eddie Cheever III (Japan) Motoaki Ishikawa	LMGTE Am	328	41st	10th
2020	(Italy) Cetilar Racing	47	Dallara P217-Gibson	(Italy) Andrea Belicchi (Italy) Roberto Lacorte (Italy) Giorgio Sernagiotto	LMP2	363	14th	10th
2020	(Italy) AF Corse	51	Ferrari 488 GTE Evo	(United Kingdom) James Calado (Italy) Alessandro Pier Guidi (Brazil) Daniel Serra	LMGTE Pro	346	21st	2nd
2020	(Italy) AF Corse	71	Ferrari 488 GTE Evo	(United Kingdom) Sam Bird (Spain) Miguel Molina (Italy) Davide Rigon	LMGTE Pro	340	NC	NC
2020	(Italy) AF Corse	52	Ferrari 488 GTE Evo	(Germany) Steffen Görig (Switzerland) Christoph Ulrich (Sweden) Alexander West	LMGTE Am	80	DNF	DNF
2020	(Italy) AF Corse	54	Ferrari 488 GTE Evo	(Italy) Francesco Castellacci (Italy) Giancarlo Fisichella (Switzerland) Thomas Flohr	LMGTE Am	330	39th	13th
2020	(Italy) AF Corse	83	Ferrari 488 GTE Evo	(France) Emmanuel Collard (Denmark) Nicklas Nielsen (France) François Perrodo	LMGTE Am	339	26th	3rd
2020	(Switzerland) Spirit of Race	55	Ferrari 488 GTE Evo	(United Kingdom) Duncan Cameron (Republic of Ireland) Matt Griffin (United Kingdom) Aaron Scott	LMGTE Am	78	DNF	DNF
2020	(Italy) Iron Lynx	60	Ferrari 488 GTE Evo	(Italy) Sergio Pianezzola (Italy) Paolo Ruberti (Italy) Claudio Schiavoni	LMGTE Am	331	37th	11th
2020	(Italy) Iron Lynx	75	Ferrari 488 GTE Evo	(Italy) Matteo Cressoni (Italy) Rino Mastronardi (Italy) Andrea Piccini	LMGTE Am	211	DNF	DNF
2020	(Italy) Iron Lynx	85	Ferrari 488 GTE Evo	(Switzerland) Rahel Frey (Denmark) Michelle Gatting (Italy) Manuela Gostner	LMGTE Am	332	34th	9th
2020	(Switzerland) Luzich Racing	61	Ferrari 488 GTE Evo	(France) Côme Ledogar (Brazil) Oswaldo Negri Jr. (Puerto Rico) Francesco Piovanetti	LMGTE Am	335	32nd	7th
2020	(United Kingdom) Red River Sport	62	Ferrari 488 GTE Evo	(United Kingdom) Bonamy Grimes (United Kingdom) Charlie Hollings (United Kingdom) Johnny Mowlem	LMGTE Am	325	41st	15th
2020	(Japan) MR Racing	70	Ferrari 488 GTE Evo	(Monaco) Vincent Abril (Japan) Kei Cozzolino (Japan) Takeshi Kimura	LMGTE Am	172	DNF	DNF
2021	(Italy) AF Corse	51	Ferrari 488 GTE Evo	(United Kingdom) James Calado (France) Côme Ledogar (Italy) Alessandro Pier Guidi	LMGTE Pro	345	20th	1st
2021	(Italy) AF Corse	52	Ferrari 488 GTE Evo	(United Kingdom) Sam Bird (Spain) Miguel Molina (Brazil) Daniel Serra	LMGTE Pro	331	37th	5th
2021	(Italy) AF Corse	54	Ferrari 488 GTE Evo	(Italy) Francesco Castellacci (Italy) Giancarlo Fisichella (Switzerland) Thomas Flohr	LMGTE Am	329	39th	11th
2021	(Italy) AF Corse	83	Ferrari 488 GTE Evo	(Denmark) Nicklas Nielsen (France) François Perrodo (Italy) Alessio Rovera	LMGTE Am	340	25th	1st
2021	(Italy) Cetilar Racing	47	Ferrari 488 GTE Evo	(Italy) Antonio Fuoco (Italy) Roberto Lacorte (Italy) Giorgio Sernagiotto	LMGTE Am	90	DNF	DNF
2021	(Switzerland) Spirit of Race	55	Ferrari 488 GTE Evo	(United Kingdom) Duncan Cameron (Republic of Ireland) Matt Griffin (South Africa) David Perel	LMGTE Am	109	DNF	DNF
2022	(Italy) AF Corse	83	Oreca 07-Gibson	(Denmark) Nicklas Nielsen (France) François Perrodo (Italy) Alessio Rovera	LMP2 (Pro-Am)	361	24th	4th
2022	(Italy) AF Corse	51	Ferrari 488 GTE Evo	(United Kingdom) James Calado (Italy) Alessandro Pier Guidi (Brazil) Daniel Serra	LMGTE Pro	350	29th	2nd
2022	(Italy) AF Corse	52	Ferrari 488 GTE Evo	(Italy) Antonio Fuoco (Spain) Miguel Molina (Italy) Davide Rigon	LMGTE Pro	349	30th	3rd
2022	(Italy) AF Corse	21	Ferrari 488 GTE Evo	(United States) Simon Mann (Switzerland) Christoph Ulrich (Finland) Toni Vilander	LMGTE Am	339	41st	8th
2022	(Italy) AF Corse	54	Ferrari 488 GTE Evo	(New Zealand) Nick Cassidy (Italy) Francesco Castellacci (Switzerland) Thomas Flohr	LMGTE Am	340	39th	6th
2022	(Italy) AF Corse	61	Ferrari 488 GTE Evo	(France) Vincent Abril (United States) Conrad Grunewald (Monaco) Louis Prette	LMGTE Am	339	42nd	9th
2022	(Switzerland) Spirit of Race	55	Ferrari 488 GTE Evo	(United Kingdom) Duncan Cameron (Republic of Ireland) Matt Griffin (South Africa) David Perel	LMGTE Am	339	43rd	10th
2022	(Switzerland) Spirit of Race	71	Ferrari 488 GTE Evo	(France) Gabriel Aubry (France) Franck Dezoteux (France) Pierre Ragues	LMGTE Am	127	DNF	DNF
2022	(United Kingdom) Inception Racing	59	Ferrari 488 GTE Evo	(France) Marvin Klein (France) Côme Ledogar (Sweden) Alexander West	LMGTE Am	190	DNF	DNF
2023	(Italy) Ferrari AF Corse	50	Ferrari 499P	(Italy) Antonio Fuoco (Spain) Miguel Molina (Denmark) Nicklas Nielsen	Hypercar	337	5th	5th
2023	(Italy) Ferrari AF Corse	51	Ferrari 499P	(United Kingdom) James Calado (Italy) Antonio Giovinazzi (Italy) Alessandro Pier Guidi	Hypercar	342	1st	1st
2023	(Italy) AF Corse	80	Oreca 07-Gibson	(United Kingdom) Ben Barnicoat (France) Norman Nato (France) François Perrodo	LMP2 (Pro-Am)	183	DNF	DNF
2023	(Italy) AF Corse	21	Ferrari 488 GTE Evo	(Belgium) Ulysse de Pauw (United States) Simon Mann (France) Julien Piguet	LMGTE Am	21	DNF	DNF
2023	(Italy) AF Corse	54	Ferrari 488 GTE Evo	(Italy) Francesco Castellacci (Switzerland) Thomas Flohr (Italy) Davide Rigon	LMGTE Am	312	31st	5th
2023	(Italy) Richard Mille AF Corse	83	Ferrari 488 GTE Evo	(Argentina) Luis Pérez Companc (Italy) Alessio Rovera (France) Lilou Wadoux	LMGTE Am	33	DNF	DNF
2023	(Germany) Walkenhorst Motorsport	100	Ferrari 488 GTE Evo	(Indonesia) Andrew Haryanto (United States) Chandler Hull (United States) Jeff Segal	LMGTE Am	307	36th	8th
2024	(Italy) Ferrari AF Corse	50	Ferrari 499P	(Italy) Antonio Fuoco (Spain) Miguel Molina (Denmark) Nicklas Nielsen	Hypercar	311	1st	1st
2024	(Italy) Ferrari AF Corse	51	Ferrari 499P	(United Kingdom) James Calado (Italy) Antonio Giovinazzi (Italy) Alessandro Pier Guidi	Hypercar	311	3rd	3rd
2024	(Italy) AF Corse	83	Ferrari 499P	(Poland) Robert Kubica (Israel) Robert Shwartzman (China) Yifei Ye	Hypercar	248	DNF	DNF
2024	(Italy) AF Corse	183	Oreca 07-Gibson	(United Kingdom) Ben Barnicoat (France) François Perrodo (Argentina) Nicolás Varrone	LMP2 (Pro-Am)	297	18th	1st
2024	(Italy) Vista AF Corse	54	Ferrari 296 GT3	(Italy) Francesco Castellacci (Switzerland) Thomas Flohr (Italy) Davide Rigon	LMGT3	30	DNF	DNF
2024	(Italy) Vista AF Corse	55	Ferrari 296 GT3	(France) François Hériau (United States) Simon Mann (Italy) Alessio Rovera	LMGT3	279	33rd	6th
2024	(Switzerland) Spirit of Race	155	Ferrari 296 GT3	(Denmark) Conrad Laursen (Denmark) Johnny Laursen (United States) Jordan Taylor	LMGT3	279	35th	8th
2025	(Italy) Ferrari AF Corse	50	Ferrari 499P	(Italy) Antonio Fuoco (Spain) Miguel Molina (Denmark) Nicklas Nielsen	Hypercar	387	DSQ	DSQ
2025	(Italy) Ferrari AF Corse	51	Ferrari 499P	(United Kingdom) James Calado (Italy) Antonio Giovinazzi (Italy) Alessandro Pier Guidi	Hypercar	387	3rd	3rd
2025	(Italy) AF Corse	83	Ferrari 499P	(United Kingdom) Phil Hanson (Poland) Robert Kubica (China) Yifei Ye	Hypercar	387	1st	1st
2025	(Italy) AF Corse	183	Oreca 07-Gibson	(Portugal) António Félix da Costa (France) François Perrodo (France) Matthieu Vaxivière	LMP2 (Pro-Am)	364	26th	4th
2025	(Italy) Vista AF Corse	21	Ferrari 296 GT3	(France) François Hériau (United States) Simon Mann (Italy) Alessio Rovera	LMGT3	341	34th	2nd
2025	(Italy) Vista AF Corse	54	Ferrari 296 GT3	(Italy) Francesco Castellacci (Switzerland) Thomas Flohr (Italy) Davide Rigon	LMGT3	192	DNF	DNF
2025	(Italy) Richard Mille AF Corse	150	Ferrari 296 GT3	(Italy) Riccardo Agostini (Brazil) Custodio Toledo (France) Lilou Wadoux	LMGT3	338	43rd	11th
2025	(United Kingdom) Ziggo Sport – Tempesta	193	Ferrari 296 GT3	(Italy) Eddie Cheever III (United Kingdom) Chris Froggatt (Hong Kong) Jonathan Hui	LMGT3	335	46th	14th
2026	(Italy) Ferrari AF Corse	50	Ferrari 499P	(Italy) Antonio Fuoco (Spain) Miguel Molina (Denmark) Nicklas Nielsen	Hypercar	284	DNF	DNF
2026	(Italy) Ferrari AF Corse	51	Ferrari 499P	(United Kingdom) James Calado (Italy) Antonio Giovinazzi (Italy) Alessandro Pier Guidi	Hypercar	381	5th	5th
2026	(Italy) AF Corse	83	Ferrari 499P	(United Kingdom) Phil Hanson (Poland) Robert Kubica (China) Yifei Ye	Hypercar	381	7th	7th
2026	(Italy) AF Corse	183	Oreca 07-Gibson	(United Kingdom) Ben Barnicoat (France) François Perrodo (France) Matthieu Vaxivière	LMP2 (Pro-Am)	357	23rd	2nd
2026	(Italy) Vista AF Corse	21	Ferrari 296 GT3 Evo	(France) François Hériau (United States) Simon Mann (Italy) Alessio Rovera	LMGT3	335	37th	5th
2026	(Italy) Vista AF Corse	54	Ferrari 296 GT3 Evo	(Italy) Francesco Castellacci (Switzerland) Thomas Flohr (Italy) Davide Rigon	LMGT3	110	DNF	DNF
2026	(Italy) Richard Mille AF Corse	150	Ferrari 296 GT3 Evo	(Italy) Riccardo Agostini (Brazil) Custodio Toledo (France) Lilou Wadoux	LMGT3	334	40th	8th

=== Deutsche Tourenwagen Masters ===
Year	Car	Drivers	Races	Wins	Poles	F/Laps	Podiums	Points	D.C.	T.C.
2021	Ferrari 488 GT3 Evo 2020	(New Zealand) Liam Lawson	16	3	4	1	10	227	2nd	1st
2021	Ferrari 488 GT3 Evo 2020	(Thailand) Alex Albon	14	1	1	3	4	130	6th	1st
2021	Ferrari 488 GT3 Evo 2020	(New Zealand) Nick Cassidy	2	0	0	1	0	11	16th	1st
2022	Ferrari 488 GT3 Evo 2020	(New Zealand) Nick Cassidy	11	2	1	1	2	64	13th	7th
2022	Ferrari 488 GT3 Evo 2020	(Brazil) Felipe Fraga	14	1	1	1	2	60	16th	7th
2022	Ferrari 488 GT3 Evo 2020	(Turkey) Ayhancan Güven	2	0	0	0	0	7	23rd	7th
2022	Ferrari 488 GT3 Evo 2020	(France) Sébastien Loeb	2	0	0	0	0	0	32nd	7th

=== FIA World Endurance Championship ===
Year	Entrant	Class	Car	Engine	No.	Driver	1	2	3	4	5	6	7	8	9	Pts.	Pos.
2012	(Italy) AF Corse	LMGTE Pro	Ferrari 458 Italia GT2	Ferrari F136 4.5 L V8	51	(Italy) Gianmaria Bruni (Italy) Giancarlo Fisichella (Finland) Toni Vilander	SEB; DSQ	SPA; 2	LMS; 1	SIL; 1	SÃO; 1	BHR; 1	FUJ; 2	SHA; Ret		201	1st
2012	(Italy) AF Corse	LMGTE Pro	Ferrari 458 Italia GT2	Ferrari F136 4.5 L V8	71	(Monaco) Olivier Beretta (Italy) Andrea Bertolini (Italy) Marco Cioci	SEB; 1	SPA; 4	LMS; 4	SIL; Ret	SÃO; 4	BHR; 4	FUJ; 4	SHA; 3		201	1st
2012	(United States) AF Corse - Waltrip	LMGTE Am	Ferrari 458 Italia GT2	Ferrari F136 4.5 L V8	61	(Portugal) Rui Águas (United States) Robert Kauffman (United States) Brian Vickers	SEB; 4	SPA; DNS	LMS; 6	SIL; 1	SÃO; 3	BHR; 2		SHA; 4		108	4th
2013	(Italy) AF Corse	LMGTE Pro	Ferrari 458 Italia GT2	Ferrari F136 4.5 L V8	51	(Italy) Gianmaria Bruni (Italy) Giancarlo Fisichella (Italy) Matteo Malucelli	SIL; 5	SPA; 1	LMS; 5	SÃO; 1	COA; 2	FUJ; 2	SHA; 4	BHR; 1		145	1st
2013	(Italy) AF Corse	LMGTE Pro	Ferrari 458 Italia GT2	Ferrari F136 4.5 L V8	71	(Monaco) Olivier Beretta (Japan) Kamui Kobayashi (Finland) Toni Vilander	SIL; 2	SPA; 2	LMS; 4	SÃO; Ret	COA; 3	FUJ; 5	SHA; 5	BHR; 3		105	5th
2013	(Italy) AF Corse	LMGTE Am	Ferrari 458 Italia GT2	Ferrari F136 4.5 L V8	61	(Italy) Marco Cioci (Republic of Ireland) Matt Griffin (South Africa) Jack Gerber	SIL; 8	SPA; 8	LMS; 2	SÃO; Ret	COA; 7	FUJ; 7	SHA; 6	BHR; 3		76	7th
2014	(Italy) AF Corse	LMGTE Pro	Ferrari 458 Italia GT2	Ferrari F136 4.5 L V8	51	(Italy) Gianmaria Bruni (Italy) Giancarlo Fisichella (Finland) Toni Vilander	SIL; 4	SPA; 1	LMS; 1	COA; 3	FUJ; 1	SHA; Ret	BHR; 1	SÃO; 3		168	1st
2014	(Italy) AF Corse	LMGTE Pro	Ferrari 458 Italia GT2	Ferrari F136 4.5 L V8	71	(Italy) Davide Rigon (Germany) Pierre Kaffer (Monaco) Olivier Beretta	SIL; 5	SPA; 3	LMS; Ret	COA; 5	FUJ; 2	SHA; 3	BHR; 3	SÃO; 2		98	5th
2014	(Italy) AF Corse	LMGTE Am	Ferrari 458 Italia GT2	Ferrari F136 4.5 L V8	61	(Italy) Marco Cioci (Argentina) Luis Pérez Companc (Italy) Mirko Venturi	SIL; 6	SPA; 1	LMS; 3	COA; 4	FUJ; 5	SHA; DNS	BHR; 6	SÃO; 6		102	4th
2014	(Italy) AF Corse	LMGTE Am	Ferrari 458 Italia GT2	Ferrari F136 4.5 L V8	81	(United Kingdom) Sam Bird (Italy) Michele Rugolo (Australia) Stephen Wyatt	SIL; 3	SPA; 6	LMS; Ret	COA; 7	FUJ; Ret	SHA; DNS	BHR; 2	SÃO; 3		68	5th
2015	(Italy) AF Corse	LMGTE Pro	Ferrari 458 Italia GT2	Ferrari F136 4.5 L V8	51	(Italy) Gianmaria Bruni (Finland) Toni Vilander (Italy) Giancarlo Fisichella	SIL; 1	SPA; 4	LMS; 2	NÜR; 7	COA; 7	FUJ; 1	SHA; 2	BHR; 2		149	2nd
2015	(Italy) AF Corse	LMGTE Pro	Ferrari 458 Italia GT2	Ferrari F136 4.5 L V8	71	(Italy) Davide Rigon (United Kingdom) James Calado (Monaco) Olivier Beretta	SIL; 3	SPA; 7	LMS; 1	NÜR; 3	COA; 3	FUJ; 3	SHA; 4	BHR; 6		137	3rd
2015	(Italy) AF Corse	LMGTE Am	Ferrari 458 Italia GT2	Ferrari F136 4.5 L V8	83	(France) François Perrodo (France) Emmanuel Collard (Portugal) Rui Águas	SIL; 2	SPA; 2	LMS; 3	NÜR; 3	COA; 3	FUJ; 3	SHA; 1	BHR; 4		148	2nd
2016	(Italy) AF Corse	LMGTE Pro	Ferrari 488 GTE	Ferrari F154CB 3.9 L Turbo V8	51	(Italy) Gianmaria Bruni (United Kingdom) James Calado (Italy) Alessandro Pier Guidi	SIL; 2	SPA; Ret	LMS; Ret	NÜR; 1	MEX; 2	COA; 2	FUJ; 3	SHA; 3	BHR; 2	128	5th
2016	(Italy) AF Corse	LMGTE Pro	Ferrari 488 GTE	Ferrari F154CB 3.9 L Turbo V8	71	(Italy) Davide Rigon (United Kingdom) Sam Bird (Italy) Andrea Bertolini	SIL; 1	SPA; 1	LMS; Ret	NÜR; 2	MEX; 4	COA; 3	FUJ; 4	SHA; 5	BHR; 3	134	3rd
2016	(Italy) AF Corse	LMGTE Am	Ferrari 458 Italia GT2	Ferrari F136 4.5 L V8	83	(France) François Perrodo (France) Emmanuel Collard (Portugal) Rui Águas	SIL; 1	SPA; 2	LMS; 1	NÜR; 2	MEX; 2	COA; 6	FUJ; 2	SHA; 2	BHR; 3	188	1st
2017	(Italy) AF Corse	LMGTE Pro	Ferrari 488 GTE	Ferrari F154CB 3.9 L Turbo V8	51	(United Kingdom) James Calado (Italy) Alessandro Pier Guidi (Italy) Michele Rugolo	SIL; 2	SPA; 2	LMS; 7	NÜR; 1	MEX; 6	COA; 1	FUJ; 1	SHA; 3	BHR; 2	164	1st
2017	(Italy) AF Corse	LMGTE Pro	Ferrari 488 GTE	Ferrari F154CB 3.9 L Turbo V8	71	(Italy) Davide Rigon (United Kingdom) Sam Bird (Finland) Toni Vilander	SIL; 5	SPA; 1	LMS; 4	NÜR; 8	MEX; 2	COA; 3	FUJ; 5	SHA; 6	BHR; 1	143	4th
2018-19	(Italy) AF Corse	LMGTE Pro	Ferrari 488 GTE	Ferrari F154CB 3.9 L Turbo V8	51	(United Kingdom) James Calado (Italy) Alessandro Pier Guidi (Brazil) Daniel Serra	SPA; 15	LMS; 4	SIL; 1	FUJ; 4	SHA; 5	SEB; 4	SPA; 2	LMS; 1		136.5	2nd
2018-19	(Italy) AF Corse	LMGTE Pro	Ferrari 488 GTE	Ferrari F154CB 3.9 L Turbo V8	71	(Italy) Davide Rigon (United Kingdom) Sam Bird (Spain) Miguel Molina	SPA; 3	LMS; 6	SIL; 16	FUJ; 10	SHA; 6	SEB; 6	SPA; 6	LMS; Ret		54.5	9th
2019-20	(Italy) AF Corse	LMGTE Pro	Ferrari 488 GTE	Ferrari F154CB 3.9 L Turbo V8	51	(United Kingdom) James Calado (Italy) Alessandro Pier Guidi (Brazil) Daniel Serra	SIL; 4	FUJ; 4	SHA; 1	BHR; 4	COA; 3	SPA; 4	LMS; 2	BHR; 12		132	4th
2019-20	(Italy) AF Corse	LMGTE Pro	Ferrari 488 GTE	Ferrari F154CB 3.9 L Turbo V8	71	(Italy) Davide Rigon (United Kingdom) Sam Bird (Spain) Miguel Molina	SIL; Ret	FUJ; 5	SHA; 6	BHR; 2	COA; 5	SPA; 6	LMS; NC	BHR; 3		86	6th
2019-20	(Italy) AF Corse	LMGTE Am	Ferrari 488 GTE	Ferrari F154CB 3.9 L Turbo V8	54	(Italy) Francesco Castellacci (Italy) Giancarlo Fisichella (Switzerland) Thomas Flohr	SIL; 9	FUJ; 6	SHA; 8	BHR; 5	COA; 7	SPA; 7	LMS; 7	BHR; 4		71	8th
2019-20	(Italy) AF Corse	LMGTE Am	Ferrari 488 GTE	Ferrari F154CB 3.9 L Turbo V8	83	(France) Emmanuel Collard (Denmark) Nicklas Nielsen (France) François Perrodo	SIL; 1	FUJ; 2	SHA; 4	BHR; 4	COA; 4	SPA; 1	LMS; 3	BHR; 2		167	1st
2021	(Italy) AF Corse	LMGTE Pro	Ferrari 488 GTE	Ferrari F154CB 3.9 L Turbo V8	51	(United Kingdom) James Calado (Italy) Alessandro Pier Guidi (France) Côme Ledogar	SPA; 2	POR; 1	MNZ; 2	LMS; 1	BHR; 3	BHR; 1				177	1st
2021	(Italy) AF Corse	LMGTE Pro	Ferrari 488 GTE	Ferrari F154CB 3.9 L Turbo V8	52	(United Kingdom) Sam Bird (Spain) Miguel Molina (Brazil) Daniel Serra	SPA; 3	POR; 2	MNZ; 4	LMS; 10	BHR; 4	BHR; 3				92	4th
2021	(Italy) AF Corse	LMGTE Am	Ferrari 488 GTE	Ferrari F154CB 3.9 L Turbo V8	54	(Italy) Francesco Castellacci (Italy) Giancarlo Fisichella (Switzerland) Thomas Flohr	SPA; 4	POR; 3	MNZ; 7	LMS; 7	BHR; 7	BHR; 6				71	6th
2021	(Italy) AF Corse	LMGTE Am	Ferrari 488 GTE	Ferrari F154CB 3.9 L Turbo V8	83	(Denmark) Nicklas Nielsen (France) François Perrodo (Italy) Alessio Rovera	SPA; 1	POR; 10	MNZ; 1	LMS; 1	BHR; 5	BHR; 1				150	1st
2022	(Italy) AF Corse	LMP2	Oreca 07	Gibson GK428 4.2 L V8	83	(Denmark) Nicklas Nielsen (France) François Perrodo (Italy) Alessio Rovera	SEB; 9	SPA; 9	LMS; 11	MNZ; 9	FUJ; 10	BHR; 10				12	12th
2022	(Italy) AF Corse	LMGTE Pro	Ferrari 488 GTE	Ferrari F154CB 3.9 L Turbo V8	51	(United Kingdom) James Calado (Italy) Alessandro Pier Guidi (Brazil) Daniel Serra	SEB; 4	SPA; 1	LMS; 2	MNZ; 3	FUJ; 1	BHR; 5				135	1st
2022	(Italy) AF Corse	LMGTE Pro	Ferrari 488 GTE	Ferrari F154CB 3.9 L Turbo V8	52	(Italy) Antonio Fuoco (Spain) Miguel Molina (Italy) Davide Rigon	SEB; 6	SPA; 3	LMS; 3	MNZ; 2	FUJ; 2	BHR; 1				131	3rd
2022	(Italy) AF Corse	LMGTE Am	Ferrari 488 GTE	Ferrari F154CB 3.9 L Turbo V8	21	(United States) Simon Mann (Switzerland) Christoph Ulrich (Finland) Toni Vilander	SEB; 7	SPA; 11	LMS; 7	MNZ; 7	FUJ; 10	BHR; 11				28	11th
2022	(Italy) AF Corse	LMGTE Am	Ferrari 488 GTE	Ferrari F154CB 3.9 L Turbo V8	54	(Italy) Francesco Castellacci (Switzerland) Thomas Flohr (New Zealand) Nick Cassidy	SEB; 9	SPA; 4	LMS; 5	MNZ; 9	FUJ; 4	BHR; 7				58	6th
2022	(Switzerland) Spirit of Race	LMGTE Am	Ferrari 488 GTE	Ferrari F154CB 3.9 L Turbo V8	71	(France) Gabriel Aubry (France) Franck Dezoteux (France) Pierre Ragues	SEB; Ret	SPA; 12	LMS; Ret	MNZ; 5	FUJ; 7	BHR; 13				16	13th
2023	(Italy) Ferrari AF Corse	Hypercar	Ferrari 499P	Ferrari F163CG 3.0 L Turbo V6	50	(Italy) Antonio Fuoco (Spain) Miguel Molina (Denmark) Nicklas Nielsen	SEB; 3	POR; 2	SPA; Ret	LMS; 4	MNZ; 2	FUJ; 4	BHR; 3			120	3rd
2023	(Italy) Ferrari AF Corse	Hypercar	Ferrari 499P	Ferrari F163CG 3.0 L Turbo V6	51	(United Kingdom) James Calado (Italy) Antonio Giovinazzi (Italy) Alessandro Pier Guidi	SEB; 7	POR; 6	SPA; 3	LMS; 1	MNZ; 5	FUJ; 5	BHR; 6			114	4th
2023	(Italy) AF Corse	LMGTE Am	Ferrari 488 GTE Evo	Ferrari F154CB 3.9 L Turbo V8	21	(United States) Simon Mann (Belgium) Ulysse de Pauw (Italy) Stefano Costantini	SEB; 4	POR; 5	SPA; 6	LMS; Ret	MNZ; 9	FUJ; 12	BHR; 11			38	10th
2023	(Italy) AF Corse	LMGTE Am	Ferrari 488 GTE Evo	Ferrari F154CB 3.9 L Turbo V8	54	(Italy) Francesco Castellacci (Switzerland) Thomas Flohr (Italy) Davide Rigon	SEB; 5	POR; 4	SPA; NC	LMS; 5	MNZ; 10	FUJ; 1	BHR; 4			91	3rd
2023	(Italy) Richard Mille AF Corse	LMGTE Am	Ferrari 488 GTE Evo	Ferrari F154CB 3.9 L Turbo V8	83	(Argentina) Luis Pérez Companc (Italy) Alessio Rovera (France) Lilou Wadoux	SEB; Ret	POR; 2	SPA; 1	LMS; Ret	MNZ; 6	FUJ; 9	BHR; 9			56	8th
2024	(Italy) Ferrari AF Corse	Hypercar	Ferrari 499P	Ferrari F163CG 3.0 L Turbo V6	50	(Italy) Antonio Fuoco (Spain) Miguel Molina (Denmark) Nicklas Nielsen	QAT; 6	IMO; 4	SPA; 3	LMS; 1	SÃO; 6	COA; 3	FUJ; 9	BHR; 11		115	2nd
2024	(Italy) Ferrari AF Corse	Hypercar	Ferrari 499P	Ferrari F163CG 3.0 L Turbo V6	51	(United Kingdom) James Calado (Italy) Antonio Giovinazzi (Italy) Alessandro Pier Guidi	QAT; 12	IMO; 7	SPA; 4	LMS; 3	SÃO; 5	COA; Ret	FUJ; Ret	BHR; 14		59	7th
2024	(Italy) AF Corse	Hypercar	Ferrari 499P	Ferrari F163CG 3.0 L Turbo V6	83	(Poland) Robert Kubica (Israel) Robert Shwartzman (China) Yifei Ye	QAT; 4	IMO; 8	SPA; 8	LMS; Ret	SÃO; 11	COA; 1	FUJ; 12	BHR; 8		57	8th
2024	(Italy) Vista AF Corse	LMGT3	Ferrari 296 GT3	Ferrari F163CE 3.0 L Turbo V6	54	(Italy) Francesco Castellacci (Switzerland) Thomas Flohr (Italy) Davide Rigon	QAT; 5	IMO; 12	SPA; 6	LMS; Ret	SÃO; 15	COA; Ret	FUJ; 1	BHR; 7		57	7th
2024	(Italy) Vista AF Corse	LMGT3	Ferrari 296 GT3	Ferrari F163CE 3.0 L Turbo V6	55	(France) François Hériau (United States) Simon Mann (Italy) Alessio Rovera	QAT; 7	IMO; 4	SPA; 13	LMS; 5	SÃO; 6	COA; 10	FUJ; 6	BHR; 1		97	3rd
2025	(Italy) Ferrari AF Corse	Hypercar	Ferrari 499P	Ferrari F163CG 3.0 L Turbo V6	50	(Italy) Antonio Fuoco (Spain) Miguel Molina (Denmark) Nicklas Nielsen	QAT; 1	IMO; 15	SPA; 2	LMS; DSQ	SÃO; 12	COA; 2	FUJ; 12	BHR; 3		98	3rd
2025	(Italy) Ferrari AF Corse	Hypercar	Ferrari 499P	Ferrari F163CG 3.0 L Turbo V6	51	(United Kingdom) James Calado (Italy) Antonio Giovinazzi (Italy) Alessandro Pier Guidi	QAT; 3	IMO; 1	SPA; 1	LMS; 3	SÃO; 11	COA; 5	FUJ; 15	BHR; 4		133	1st
2025	(Italy) AF Corse	Hypercar	Ferrari 499P	Ferrari F163CG 3.0 L Turbo V6	83	(United Kingdom) Phil Hanson (Poland) Robert Kubica (China) Yifei Ye	QAT; 2	IMO; 4	SPA; 15	LMS; 1	SÃO; 8	COA; 7	FUJ; 9	BHR; 5		117	2nd
2025	(Italy) Vista AF Corse	LMGT3	Ferrari 296 GT3	Ferrari F163CE 3.0 L Turbo V6	21	(France) François Hériau (United States) Simon Mann (Italy) Alessio Rovera	QAT; 5	IMO; Ret	SPA; 1	LMS; 2	SÃO; 13	COA; 12	FUJ; 2	BHR; 5		109	2nd
2025	(Italy) Vista AF Corse	LMGT3	Ferrari 296 GT3	Ferrari F163CE 3.0 L Turbo V6	54	(Italy) Francesco Castellacci (Switzerland) Thomas Flohr (Italy) Davide Rigon	QAT; 8	IMO; 5	SPA; 3	LMS; Ret	SÃO; 11	COA; 3	FUJ; 6	BHR; Ret		54	7th
2026	(Italy) Ferrari AF Corse	Hypercar	Ferrari 499P	Ferrari F163CG 3.0 L Turbo V6	50	(Italy) Antonio Fuoco (Spain) Miguel Molina (Denmark) Nicklas Nielsen	IMO; 6	SPA; 3	LMS	SÃO	COA	FUJ	QAT	BHR		23*	5th*
2026	(Italy) Ferrari AF Corse	Hypercar	Ferrari 499P	Ferrari F163CG 3.0 L Turbo V6	51	(United Kingdom) James Calado (Italy) Antonio Giovinazzi (Italy) Alessandro Pier Guidi	IMO; 2	SPA; Ret	LMS	SÃO	COA	FUJ	QAT	BHR		19*	6th*
2026	(Italy) AF Corse	Hypercar	Ferrari 499P	Ferrari F163CG 3.0 L Turbo V6	83	(United Kingdom) Phil Hanson (Poland) Robert Kubica (China) Yifei Ye	IMO; 10	SPA; 6	LMS	SÃO	COA	FUJ	QAT	BHR		9*	9th*
2026	(Italy) Vista AF Corse	LMGT3	Ferrari 296 GT3 Evo	Ferrari F163CE 3.0 L Turbo V6	21	(France) François Hériau (United States) Simon Mann (Italy) Alessio Rovera	IMO; 6	SPA; 4	LMS	SÃO	COA	FUJ	QAT	BHR		20*	5th*
2026	(Italy) Vista AF Corse	LMGT3	Ferrari 296 GT3 Evo	Ferrari F163CE 3.0 L Turbo V6	54	(Italy) Francesco Castellacci (Switzerland) Thomas Flohr (Italy) Davide Rigon	IMO; 11	SPA; 15	LMS	SÃO	COA	FUJ	QAT	BHR		0*	17th*

* Season still in progress.

== AF Corse-Waltrip ==
(Italy) (United States) AF Corse-Waltrip
- Founded: 2011
- Folded: 2013
- Team principal(s): Michael Waltrip; Rob Kauffman
- Former series: FIA World Endurance Championship (2012); Rolex Sports Car Series (2012–2013)
- Noted drivers: (United States) Michael Waltrip (WEC/RSCC) (United States) Rob Kauffman (WEC/RSCC) (Portugal) Rui Águas (WEC/RSCC) (United States) Travis Pastrana (RSCC) (United States) Brian Vickers (WEC) (United States) Clint Bowyer (RSCC)

AF Corse-Waltrip, also known as AF-Waltrip, is a former professional sportscar team. The company was a 50–50 partnership between Michael Waltrip Racing NASCAR co-owners Michael Waltrip and Rob Kauffman. In 2011, Michael Waltrip Racing entered into a technical alliance with AF Corse to provide them sportscars to race in the FIA World Endurance Championship and Rolex Sports Car Series. AF Corse-Waltrip shut down their sportscar team in 2013 to concentrate on NASCAR.

=== Racing results ===
==== Complete FIA World Endurance Championship results ====
Year	Class	Car	Engine	No.	Driver	1	2	3	4	5	6	7	8	Pts.	Pos.
2012	LMGTE Am	Ferrari 458 Italia GT2	Ferrari 4.5 L V8	61	(Portugal) Rui Águas 1, 2, 3, 6, 8 (United States) Rob Kauffman 1, 2, 3, 6, 8 (United States) Michael Waltrip 1 (United States) Brian Vickers 2, 3, 6 (Italy) Marco Cioci 4, 8 (Italy) Piergiuseppe Perazzini 4 (Republic of Ireland) Matt Griffin 4 (Brazil) Enrique Bernoldi 5 (Brazil) Xandy Negrão 5 (Brazil) Francisco Longo 5	SEB; 4	SPA; DNS	LMS; 4	SIL; 1	SÃO; 3	BHR; 2	FUJ	SHA; 4	108	4th

==== Rolex Sports Car Series Points ====
Year	Class	Car	Engine	No.	Driver	1	2	3	4	5	6	7	8	9	10	11	12	13	Pts.	Pos.
2012	GT	Ferrari 458 Italia	Ferrari 4.5 L V8	56	(Portugal) Rui Águas 1, 8, 9, 10 (United States) Robert Kauffman 1, 8, 9, 10 (United States) Travis Pastrana 1 (United States) Michael Waltrip 1	DAY; 35	BIR	HOM	NJ	BEL	LEX	ELK	WAT; 11	IMS; 14	WAT; 15	MON	LGA	LIM		
2013	GT	Ferrari 458 Italia	Ferrari 4.5 L V8	56	(Portugal) Rui Águas 1, 7, 8 (United States) Robert Kauffman 1, 7, 8 (United States) Clint Bowyer 1 (United States) Michael Waltrip 1	DAY; 17	TXS	BIR	ATL	BEL	LEX	WAT; 14	IMS; 14	ELK	KAN	LGA	LIM			
