= Vistas =

Vistas is the plural of vista and may refer to:

- Vels Institute of Science, Technology & Advanced Studies, Chennai, Tamil Nadu, India
- Vistas High School Program, an alternative public high school program based in unincorporated Harris County, Texas, United States
- Victoria Vistas, a former Canadian soccer club
- Vistas (band), a Scottish alternative, indie rock band

== See also ==
- Vista (disambiguation)
