= Air Hamburg =

Charter airline in Hamburg, Germany

VistaJet Germany GmbH
IATA	ICAO	Call sign
H5	VJH	Vista Germany
- Founded: 2006
- Fleet size: 25
- Destinations: charter
- Parent company: Vista Global Holding
- Headquarters: Hamburg, Germany
- Key people: Jost Hofmann, Tobias Schramm
- Employees: about 300
- Website: www.air-hamburg.de

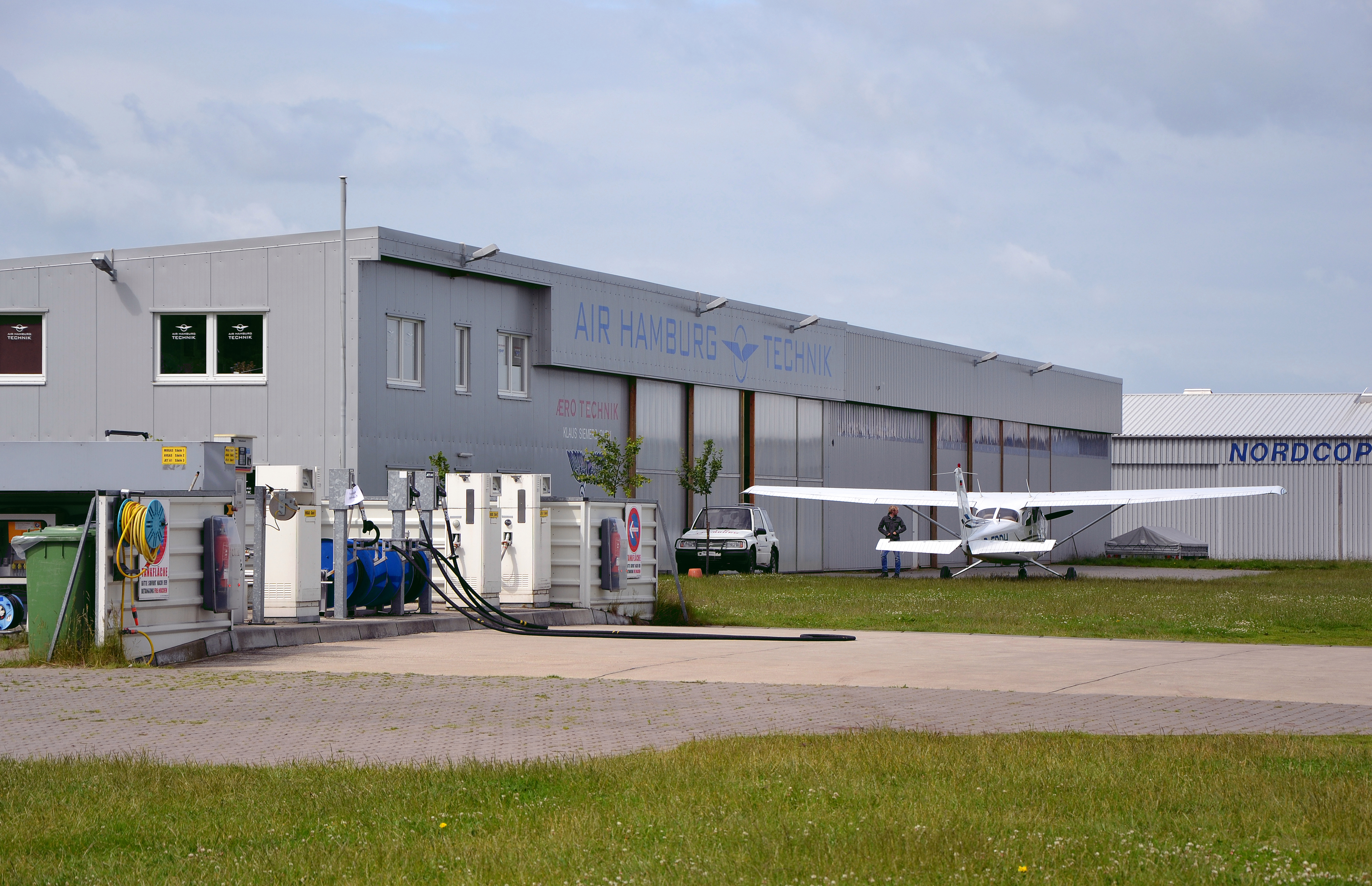
Flugschule Hamburg Hangar at Uetersen Airfield

VistaJet Germany GmbH (formerly known as Air Hamburg Luftverkehrsgesellschaft mbH) is part of VistaJet and part of the Vista Global Holding. Formerly Air Hamburg was an open-base charter airline headquartered in Hamburg, Germany. According to its own statement, it was prior to being absorbed by Vista Global the "largest provider of charter business aviation in Europe".

In 2001, two entrepreneurs (Floris Helmers and Alexander Lipsky) founded Flugschule Hamburg - a commercial aviation school. In 2005, under a newly established company name, Air Hamburg, and with their single and twin-engine aircraft, they began offering regular round-trip flights to nearby areas including Germany's northern islands, such as Heligoland, Juist, Norderney and Sylt. Due to the increasing number of private charter requests, the Air Hamburg Private Jets brand was founded in 2006.

In February 2022, Air Hamburg was acquired by Vista Global Holding, the parent company of VistaJet and XOJET. Alongside Air Hamburg, Air Hamburg Technik, based at Baden Airpark, and Executive Handling, based at the Hamburg Business Aviation Center (GAT), were also acquired. The Flugschule Hamburg and Café Himmelschreiber remain in the ownership of the two original founders Helmers and Lipsky.

As of October 2023, Air Hamburg is now VistaJet GmbH and part of the Vista Holding Group.

== Former Air Hamburg Partners (no longer managed by VistaJet Germany) ==
=== Flugschule Hamburg ===
Flugschule Hamburg, one of the largest flight schools in Germany, offers training in accordance with JAR-FCL guidelines. The flight school is an ATO (Complex Approved Training Organization) recognized by the Luftfahrt-Bundesamt (German Federal Aviation Authority) and trains private, commercial as well as airline pilots. All current licenses can be acquired there.

=== Café Himmelschreiber ===
Café Himmelschreiber is located directly next to the Business Aviation Center (GAT) at Hamburg Airport. It is both a public café and an event location directly adjacent to Hamburg Airport's tarmac. It also serves as a partner for exclusive catering within Business Aviation.
