= VSTA =

VSTA may refer to:

Technology

- Visual Studio Tools for Applications, set of app-customization tools
- VSTa, an operating system
- VSTA, the VAXstation Display Management Library

Other uses

- Virus-Serum-Toxin Act, U.S. law passed in 1913 regulating animal vaccines
- Victorian Secondary Teachers Association, trade union organisation which existed from 1953 to 1995

== See also ==
- Vista (disambiguation)
