= Vista (Hong Kong) =

Housing estate in Hong Kong

Coordinates: 22.3329°N 114.1609°E

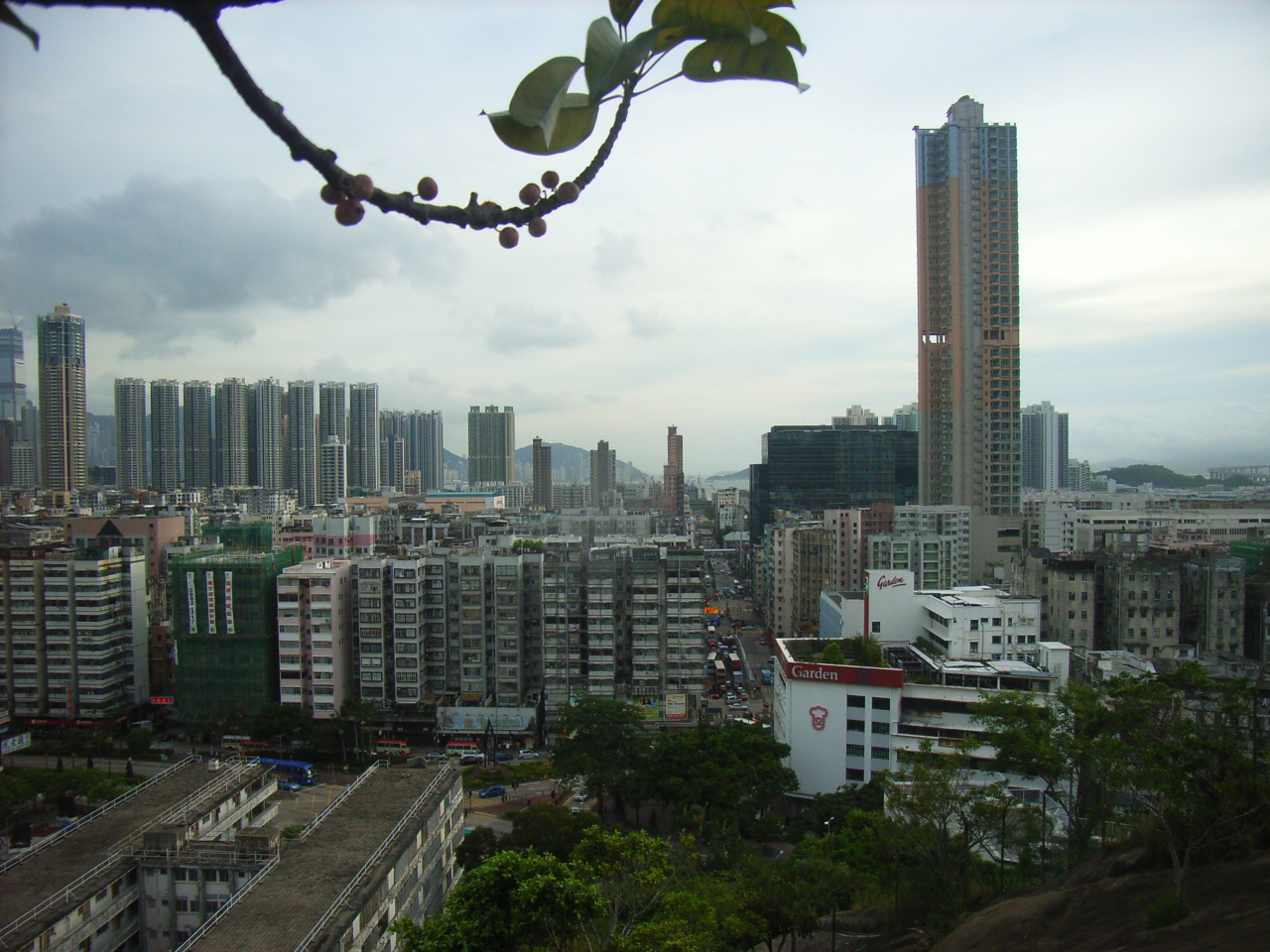
The view of VISTA (the highest building in the photo)

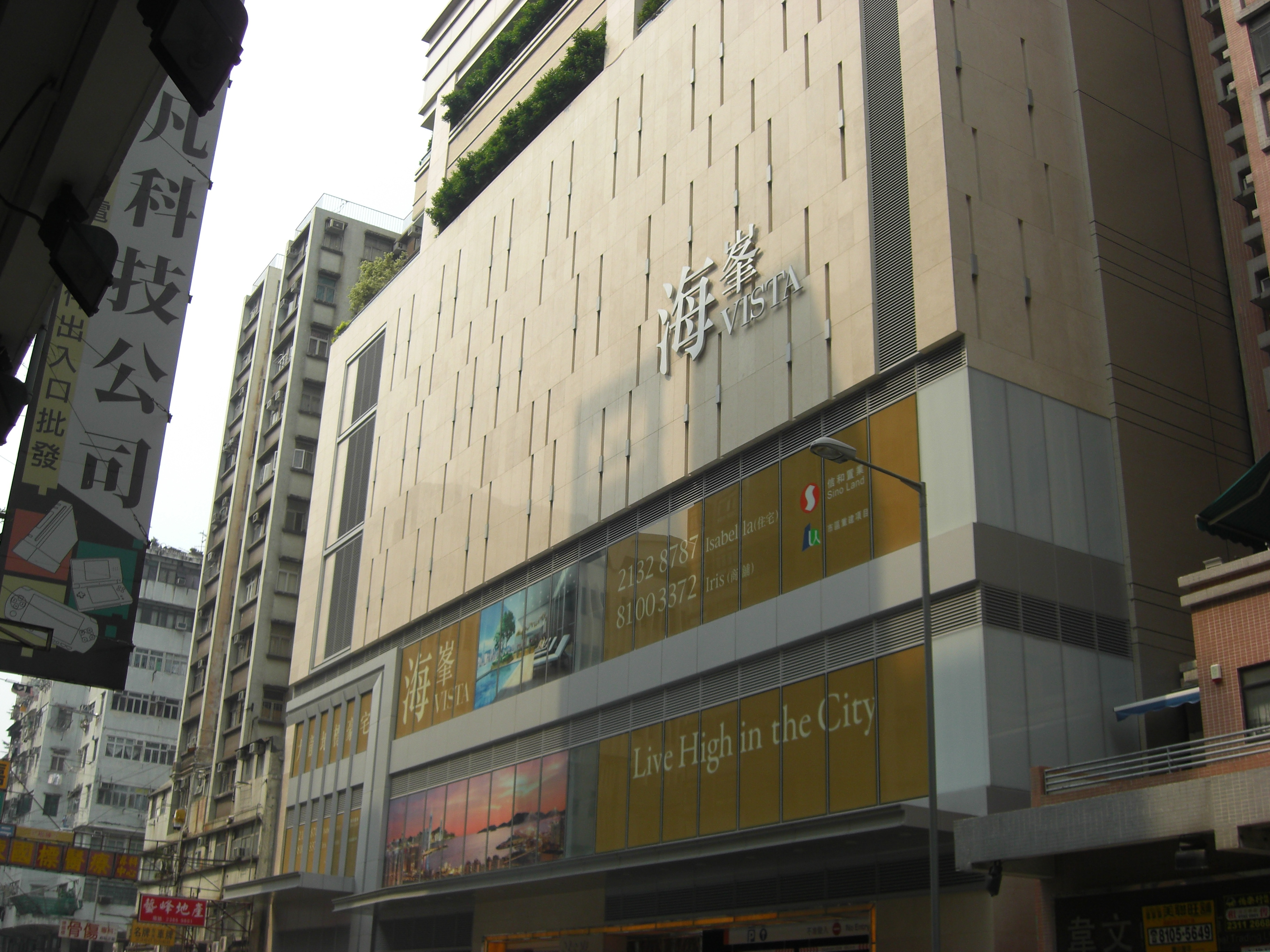
VISTA

VISTA (Chinese: 海峯) is a private housing estate in Fuk Wa Street, Sham Shui Po, Kowloon, Hong Kong, near Sham Shui Po station. Being one of the tallest buildings in Sham Shui Po area, it consists of one residential building with a total of 173 units. It was jointly developed by Sino Land and Urban Renewal Authority in 2009.
