= Jetpooling =

Sharing cost of jet travel

Jetpooling (also known as jet-sharing) is an arrangement among a group of jet travelers by which each individual shares the cost of private jet travel by paying on a per seat, pro rata basis. Those included in such arrangements are referred to as 'jetpoolers'. Jetpooling is a fairly new concept (12/2008) that originated as an alternative for air travelers to still enjoy the benefits of travelling on a private jet without paying all of the expenses involved. It was also developed to help offset carbon emissions by allowing people who would otherwise book separate jets, to fly together.

Jetpoolers match flight terms and then enlists an agent to act on their behalf to secure lift for the trip. With jetpooling, flights are not previously booked, per se', rather they are booked once travelers agree on terms (from, to, date, time). No funds change hands amongst the travelers. Flight costs are collected by the agent that secures the jet.

The jetpooling concept has a poor track-record for success. DayJet, BlackJet, Indigo, GreenJets, CoGoJets, POGO, ShareAJet Exchange, Jet-It-Together, Airpooler, Avion Private Jet Club, Gotham Air, Club Airways, Beacon, Perfect Jet Travel, Freshjets, JumpJet and SATSair are some of the failures witnessed by the business aviation industry.

Jetpooling only applies to aircraft with turbine engines. Some aviation companies may offer a similar product using smaller, piston aircraft, but within the United States, these offerings do not require DOT/FAA approval to do so. American companies that offer jetpooling using the aforementioned concept must receive DOT/FAA approval in order to legally allow travelers to pay on a per seat, pro rata basis.
