= XOJET =

Private airliner provider service

XO Global LLC

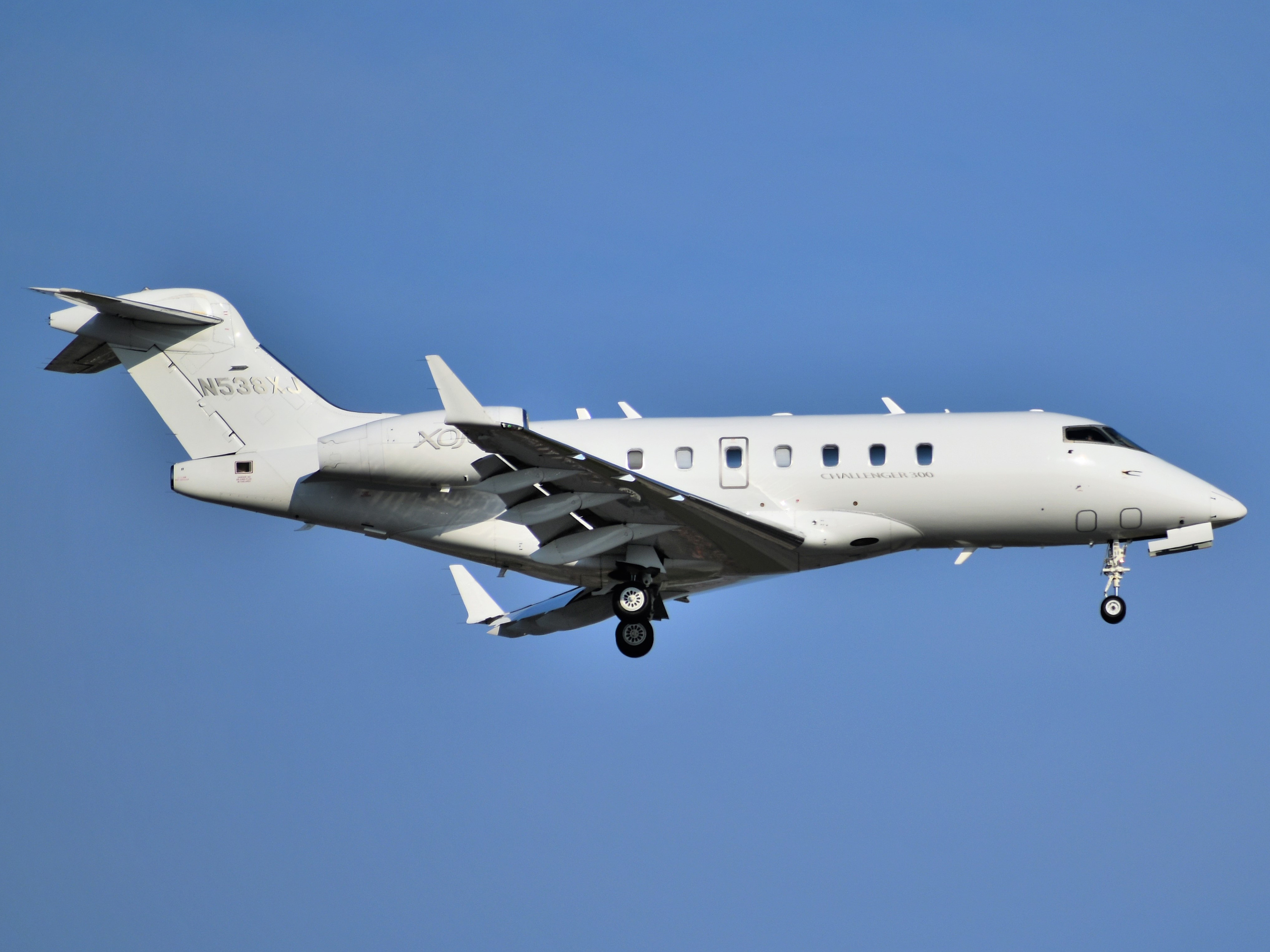
- Bombardier Challenger 300
IATA	ICAO	Call sign
—	XOJ	EXOJET
- Founded: 2006
- AOC #: AWKA298C
- Fleet size: 180
- Parent company: Vista Global
- Headquarters: Fort Lauderdale, Florida, United States
- Key people: Andreas Mauritzson, President, XOJET Aviation LLC; Sergey Petrossov, President, XO
- Founder: Paul Touw, co-founder Keith Krach, Co-founder
- Website: flyxo.com

XO (formerly XOJET) is a US-based private aviation company and subsidiary of Vista Global in Fort Lauderdale, Florida.

== Services ==
XO is an on-demand private jet company. The company offers a number of private jet charter programs that allow customers to choose their arrival and departure points.

In July 2017, XOJET launched Select Access, a new $50,000 membership level; added lite- and mid-size jets to its Elite Access program; and instituted a program for membership with monthly fees. In August of that year, XOJET reported it serviced more than 7,000 clients worldwide.

== History ==
XOJET was founded in 2006 by Paul Touw and Keith Krach as a private jet charter company with customers purchasing a set number of annual flight hours, similar to fractional ownership. The company is based in Fort Lauderdale, Florida.

=== Acquired ===
TPG Capital and Mubadala, two of the world's largest private capital investors, acquired XOJet in 2009.

In February 2017, XOJET said it had retained Perella Weinberg Partners to explore financial options, including a possible sale or merger. On September 20, 2018, Vista Global (founded by Thomas Flohr in 2018 and the parent company of VistaJet), said it had reached an agreement to acquire the fleet and commercial operations of XOJET. In April 2019, Vista purchased the Florida-based mobile booking app developer JetSmarter.

Vista took a controlling interest in XOJET in June 2019. With this purchase, Vista Global became the third-largest charter operator in the US. Vista Global shortly afterward merged XOJET with JetSmarter, powered by JetSmarter technology. Jetsmarter was founded by Sergey Petrossov. Petrossov joined Vista and led XO as President through 2024. In 2019, the combined entity was rebranded as XO. Under Petrossov, in 2021, Vista Global announced an 82% year-on-year increase in XO deposit-members.

== Fleet ==
XO owns and operates Bombardier Challenger 300 and Cessna Citation X jets. Through a preferred operator partnership program, XO has access to 1,450+ private aircraft; available types include the Hawker 400XP, Hawker 800XP and Gulfstream V.
