= VistaJet =

Global business aviation company

VistaJet Holding SA

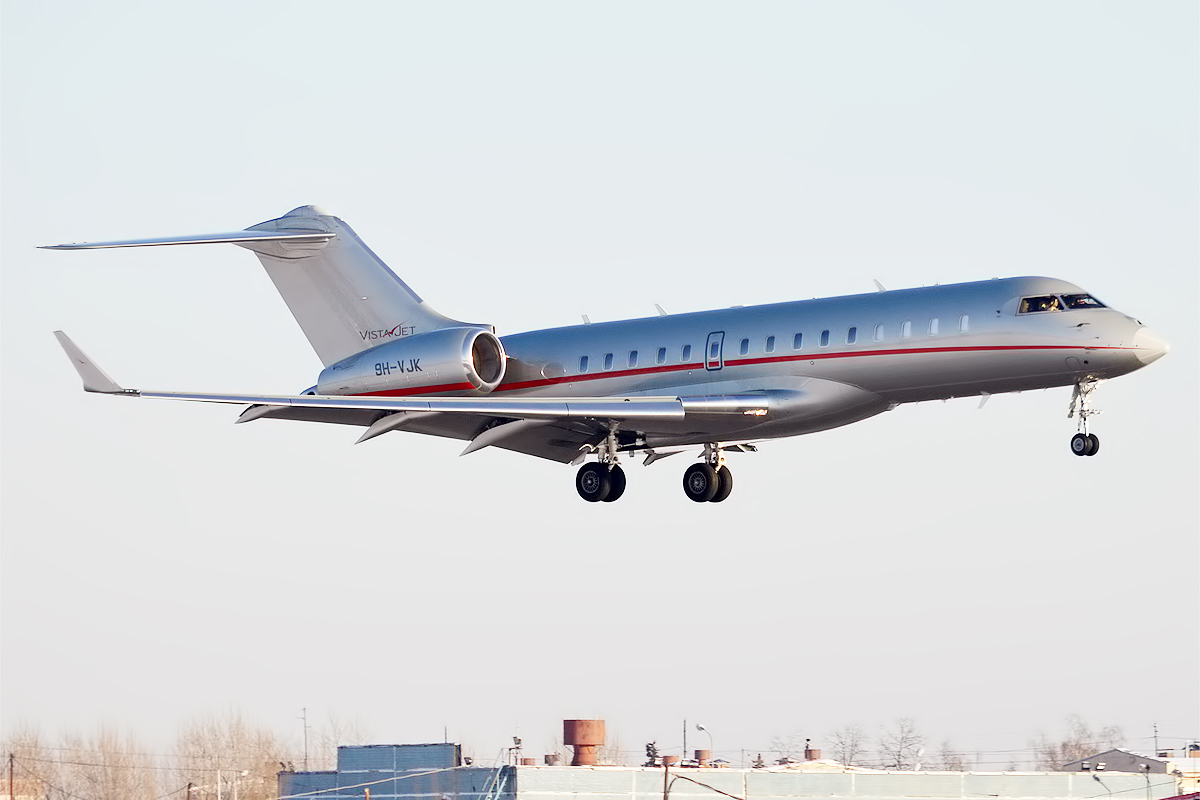
IATA	ICAO	Call sign
—	VJT	VISTAJET
- Founded: 2004
- Commenced operations: 2005
- AOC #: Malta MT-17
- Operating bases: Malta International Airport
- Focus cities: Global
- Frequent-flyer program: Program
- Subsidiaries: Air Hamburg
- Fleet size: 360 jets
- Parent company: Vista Global Holding
- Headquarters: Luqa, Malta
- Key people: Thomas Flohr (founder and chairman)
- Website: https://www.VistaJet.com

VistaJet is a global business aviation company founded in 2004 by billionaire Thomas Flohr. The company operates flights between global destinations under a "pay for hours flown" fare structure.

In January 2023, its fleet consisted of over 360 planes including mid-to-large cabin, Bombardier Global and Challenger business jets. The company has flown to 207 countries and 1,900 airports. Its headquarters are in Malta, with further offices in London, New York, Los Angeles, Hong Kong and Dubai.

VistaJet has a European air operator's certificate in Malta. It partners with local operators in countries where airlines are obliged to fly domestically and cannot be the majority owner of an AOC, such as the US, where VistaJet-owned and U.S.-registered aircraft are operated by licensed U.S. direct air carriers.

== History ==
VistaJet was originally named Air Executive when Flohr founded the business in 2004. Back then, its headquarters were located in Switzerland, with operations in Austria.

=== 2003–2005 ===
In 2003, Flohr bought an aircraft for his own use. He was able to purchase this and subsequent aircraft at discounted rates, as sales for private jets had severely weakened post-9/11, a development which Flohr has since attributed as key to the subsequent growth of the business, along with expansion in Eastern European markets and a favorable dollar/euro exchange rate.

Flohr commissioned a financial analysis of the private aviation industry, driven by his interest in the field. The study indicated the absence of a single global brand in the industry and highlighted that many private jets available for hire were owner-operated, rented out only when not in use by the owners. To provide flights that were "not subject to owner availability," Flohr deviated from the industry norm of home bases, where privately owned charter planes typically return to a fixed location to remain at the owner's disposal. By eliminating the need for home bases, jets could pick up clients from the airport closest to their location.

2002 Cessna Citation Excel on the ramp at Monmouth Executive Airport

=== 2006–2009 ===
In 2008, the firm acquired Bombardier Skyjet International, effectively assuming control of the aircraft manufacturer's executive aircraft charter program, at the same time placing a US$1.2 billion order for 35 Bombardier business jets. It was reported to be Bombardier Business Aircraft's largest-ever single order. The deal included taking over Skyjet's bases at Farnborough, Dubai International and Hong Kong International airports, and made VistaJet the second-largest private jet company outside America. During this period, the firm entered private aviation markets in Africa, Asia-Pacific and the Middle East It also redesigned its marketing and aircraft cabins to position itself as a branded luxury good. By 2009, the firm was operating a fleet of 23 jets.

=== 2010–2016 ===
In 2012, VistaJet ordered 142 Bombardier Global 5000, 6000, 7000, and 8000 aircraft, potentially worth $7.8 billion. In 2013, VistaJet placed a further order for 20 Bombardier Challenger aircraft, with options for another 20, in a deal worth around $518 million.

The firm expanded its service to America in 2013 via a partnership with Jet Aviation Flight Services, which operated Bombardier Global aircraft for VistaJet. The move saw VistaJet targeting former and current fractional ownership customers in the US, as well as full aircraft owners.

By 2014, VistaJet had flown over 150,000 passengers and opened a representative office in New York. In 2015, VistaJet expanded the US fleet available to customers to include the Challenger 350 aircraft, then operated by Priester Aviation. In the same year, it sold its remaining LearJet 60, ending the company's association with light jets, and began to exclusively operate Bombardier Challenger and Global aircraft. VistaJet was the first international operator permitted to offer domestic flights in China. In the same year, the company co-published a book with Assouline, titled The Art of Flying.

In March 2016, VistaJet moved its corporate headquarters to Malta and took delivery of its 50th Maltese-registered aircraft. The company announced adding its 70th aircraft to the fleet in October 2016. The fleet numbered 77 aircraft by 2023.

=== 2017–2018 ===
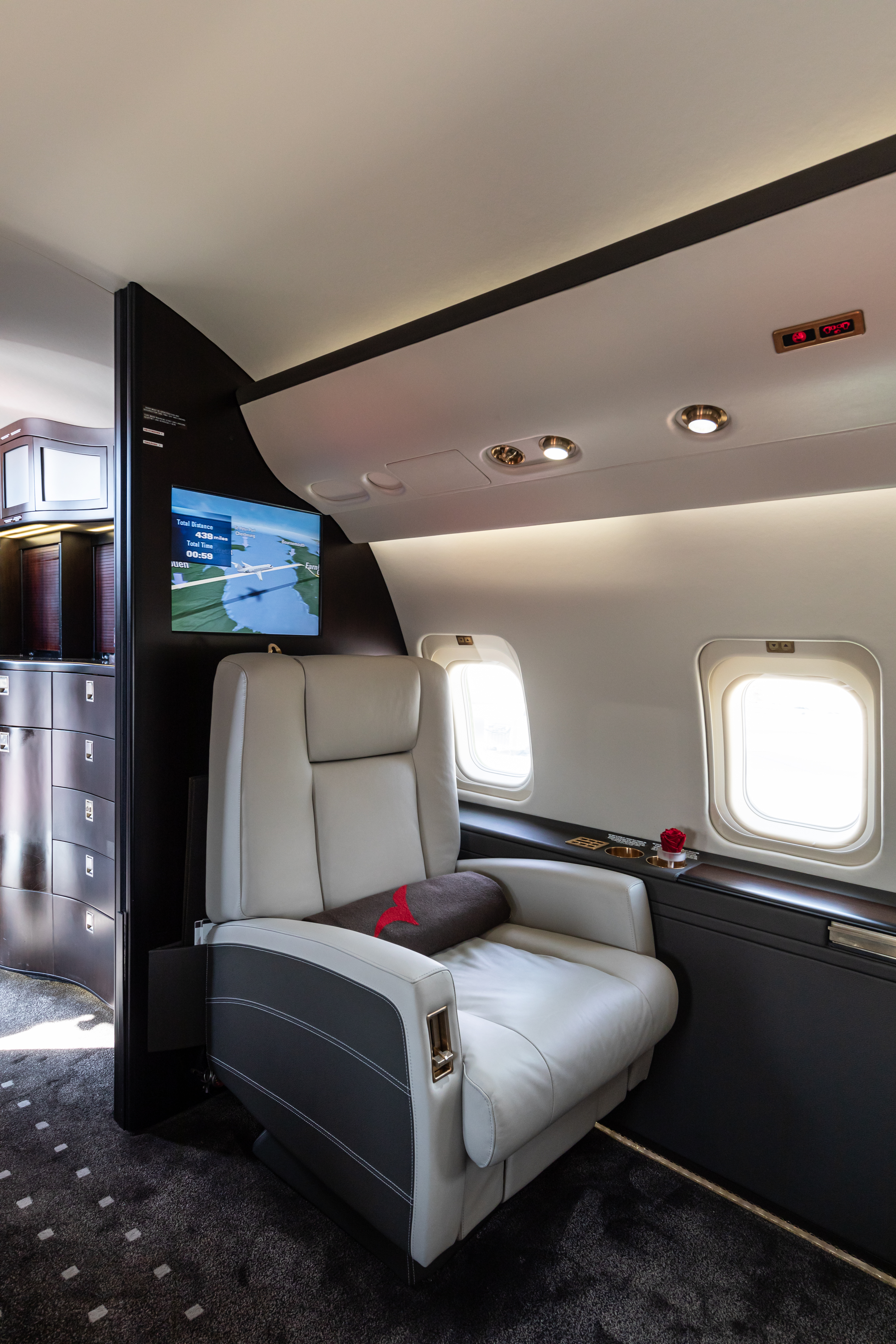
Cabin of a VistaJet Challenger 850

In 2017, the firm expanded its US-based fleet by 50%. In March 2017, the company completed its 100,000th flight. In May, VistaJet abolished positioning fees.

In August 2017, VistaJet announced a $150m investment by funds affiliated to Rhône Capital. Together with secondary acquisitions, Rhône would have a $200 million stake in VistaJet, valuing VistaJet at more than $2.5 billion. The company is one of the top five European startups by funding.

In November 2017, VistaJet announced a worldwide partnership with Christie's to sponsor the exhibition and tour of The Collection of Peggy and David Rockefeller, dedicated to raising funds for philanthropic causes. The tour took highlights of the Rockefellers' collection to Hong Kong, London, Paris, Beijing, Los Angeles and Shanghai, ending in New York with the auction.

In September 2018, Vista Global, the holding company of VistaJet, announced it had acquired the fleet and commercial operations of the US-based charter operator and broker XOJET.

=== 2019 ===
In April 2019, Vista Global announced it had purchased JetSmarter, a digital broker with a membership program enabling customers to book single seats on private jet flights. XOJET Aviation LLC will be the operator for VistaJet US Inc registered aircraft.

=== 2020–2022 ===
During the 2019-2020 COVID-19 pandemic, VistaJet offered complimentary empty leg flights for governments and medical transportation. It also took delivery of its first Bombardier Global 7500 aircraft. In 2021 the firm added a further four 7500s and sold more than 8,000 new annual subscription hours, up 67% year-on-year. It also acquired light jets and aircraft management services, through its purchase of Red Wing Aviation, Apollo Jet and Talon Air.

In March 2022, VistaJet added its 10th Global 7500 to the fleet, making it a major operator of the Global 7500 aircraft.

By the end of 2022 VistaJet's fleet of Global 7500 had grown to 18 aircraft.

In September 2023, Vista Global Holding (Vista) announced that it entered into an agreement to acquire Air Hamburg's operating platform and maintenance services. Founded in 2006, Air Hamburg flew to over 1,000 destinations in Europe.

=== 2024 ===
In June 2024, Julian Assange departed the United Kingdom aboard a VistaJet plane.

In 2024, VistaJet's founder filed legal proceedings against AirX and British financier Timothy Horlick claiming a smear campaign had been launched against VistaJet. The filing also claims that AirX founder John Matthews used a burner email address with a fabricated identity to send emails to business contacts of VistaJet, bypassing court-ordered confidentiality.

== Business model ==
VistaJet's business model was designed in opposition to fractional jet ownership, where usage prices tend to be lower but the overall cost of ownership is potentially greater.

VistaJet's business model is to fly to destinations on demand rather than as part of a scheduled route, known as a "go-anywhere any-time". The jets are owned by the company and are hired to clients at an hourly rate rather than leased.

VistaJet operates two passenger service offerings, named "Program" and "Direct". The "Program" is a multi-year subscription with committed payments securing guaranteed availability, marketed as an alternative to business jet ownership. "Direct" customers request flights directly. It also grants access to preferential rates on empty legs and one-way flights, based on aircraft availability. The VistaJet app was launched in summer 2017. The firm is an official supplier to Scuderia Ferrari.

== Fleet ==
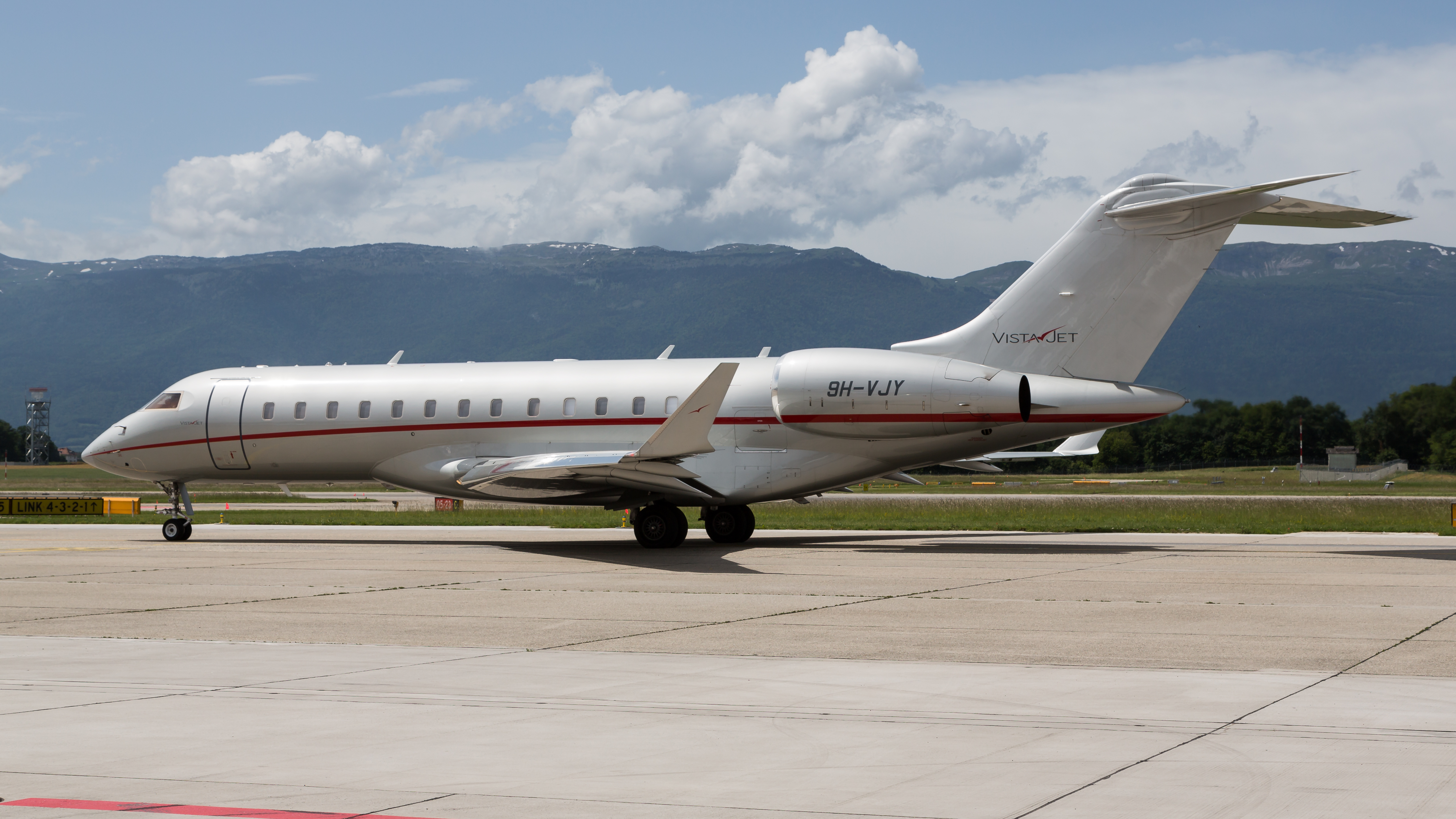
VistaJet Bombardier Global 6000

VistaJet operates Bombardier and Embraer business jets and operates a fleet of Bombardier super-mid to large business jets. Its current fleet includes:

- Bombardier Global 7500
- Bombardier Global 6000
- Bombardier Global 5000
- Bombardier Challenger 850
- Bombardier Challenger 605
- Bombardier Challenger 300/350
- Cessna Citation XLS
- Dassault Falcon 7X
- Embraer Legacy 650/650E
- Embraer Legacy 600

In 2012, VistaJet placed US$7.8 billion in both firm and option orders for 142 Bombardier Global business jets.

In 2013, VistaJet placed a firm order for 20 Challenger 350 jets and options for an additional 20 Challenger 350 jets, worth US$1.035 billion. In 2016, the fleet doubled to over 70 Challenger and Global aircraft.

The firm has commissioned artists for nose art projects. In 2011, the street artist Retna was commissioned to graffiti the tail of a Bombardier Global Express XRS, and, in 2013, an Ian Davenport design was commissioned by VistaJet and Fabergé for the tail of a VistaJet Bombardier Global 6000. The Davenport art piece coincided with a promotional campaign in which Fabergé eggs were offered to VistaJet clients as an in-flight jewelry purchase.

== See also ==
- Fractional ownership of aircraft
- AirSprint
- Flexjet
- NetJets
- PlaneSense
- Wheels Up
