= Vista Global =

Aviation company in Dubai

- Company type: Private
- Industry: Aviation
- Founded: 2018
- Founder: Thomas Flohr
- Headquarters: Dubai, UAE
- Website: vistaglobal.com

Vista Global Holding Limited is a private aviation group based in Dubai. It was founded in 2018 by Thomas Flohr. The group offers private jet services under VistaJet and XO.

== Overview ==
Vista was launched on September 20, 2018 with support from the global private equity firm, Rhône, which invested an additional $200 million. Vista became the parent company of VistaJet, a global business aviation company that Flohr founded in 2004. A week after Vista's launch, it acquired the on-demand private jet company, XOJET.

In April 2019, Vista acquired JetSmarter, a technology-enabled service provider specializing in the aviation industry, and in June, it merged XOJET with JetSmarter and rebranded the companies as XO.

By 2020, Vista acquired Red Wing Aviation, Apollo Jet, and Talon Air.

In February 2022, Vista acquired Air Hamburg, the private jet operator with the highest number of flights across Europe. In March, it acquired Jet Edge, a private aviation company based in North America, offering jet cards and charter flight services. Over 800 Jet Edge employees also joined Vista.

In April 2022, Fitch Ratings assigned Vista Global's $500 million notes a final BB- rating with a Recovery Rating of RR3.

As of February 2024, Fitch Ratings assigned Vista’s IDR at "B+" with a recovery rating of RR3.

In 2024, Vista’s founder Thomas Flohr alleged in legal filings that a rival company and Timothy Horlick, a British financier, launched a smear campaign against Vista. Flohr claims that AirX founder John Matthews used a burner email address with a fabricated identity to send emails to business contacts of VistaJet, bypassing court-ordered confidentiality. He also alleges Matthews created a WhatsApp group in March 2023, titled VistaComms, which was used to discuss with colleagues the use of burner emails to share confidential information about VistaJet with lenders, business partners, and journalists.
