= Cessna Citation Sovereign =

Super mid-size business jet

Model 680 Citation Sovereign
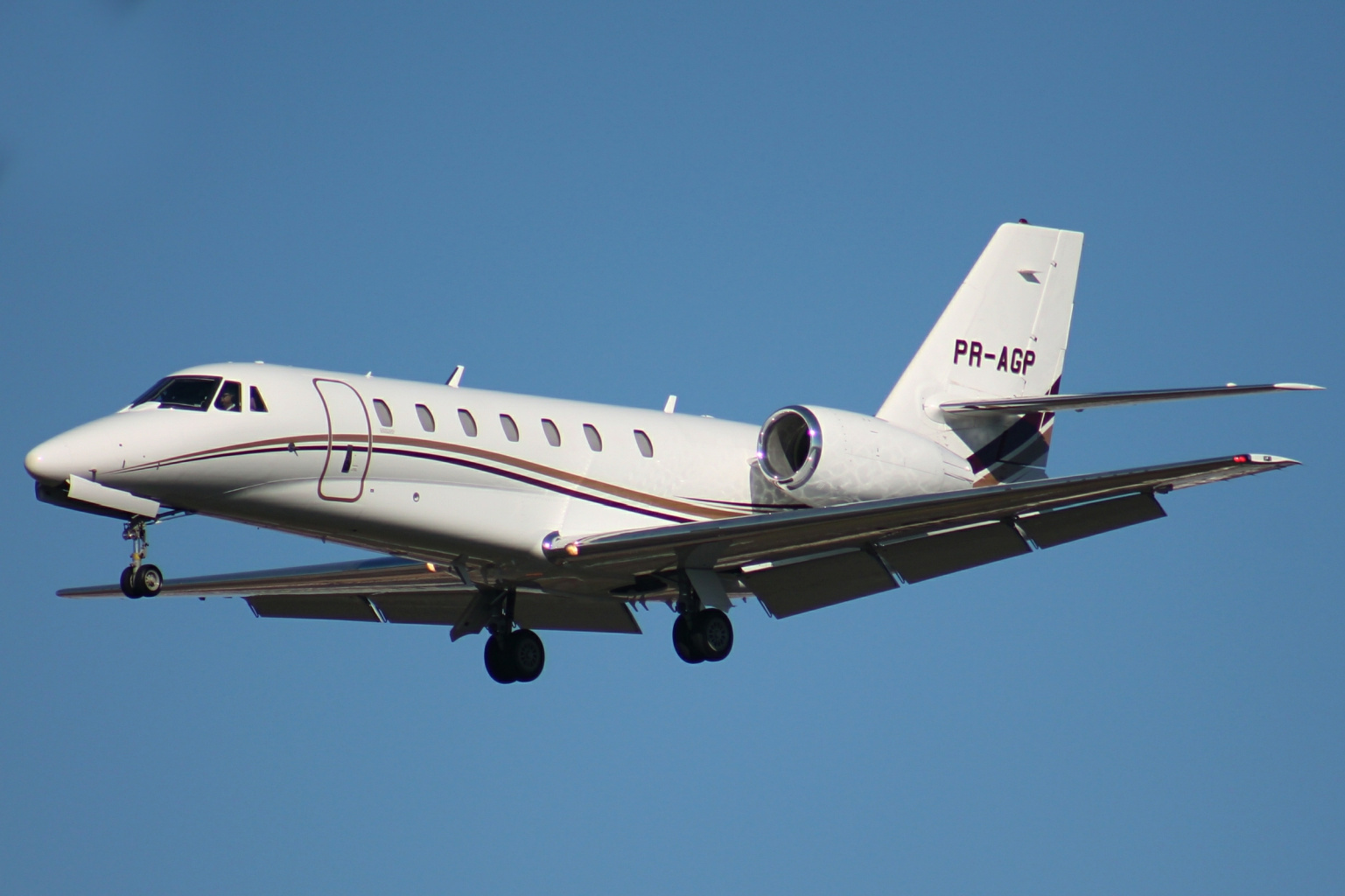

General information
- Type: Business jet
- Manufacturer: Cessna (Textron Aviation)
- Status: In service
- Number built: 349 Sovereign, 94 Sovereign+

History
- Manufactured: 2004–2021
- First flight: February 2002
- Developed from: Cessna Citation Excel
- Developed into: Cessna Citation Latitude

The Cessna Citation Sovereign (Model 680) is an American business jet developed by Cessna, part of the Cessna Citation family. Announced at the 1998 NBAA convention, the Model 680 made its maiden flight in February 2002, certification was awarded on June 2, 2004, and deliveries began in late September. The Citation Excel fuselage was stretched and joined with an all-new, larger wing and more powerful Pratt & Whitney Canada PW306C engines for increased maximum takeoff weight and a 3,200 nmi (3,700 mi; 5,900 km) range. The improved Sovereign+ was announced at the October 2012 NBAA for a first flight in April 2013 and deliveries in December, with added winglets and an improved flight deck and engines.

== Development ==
In the late 1990s, Cessna wanted to fill a gap in its midsize line-up as demand for its Cessna Citation III/VI/VII waned, with greater cabin comfort, performance and utility with Citation reliability, good runway performance, near transcontinental flight range to compete with the Hawker 800, and a thrust-to-weight ratio to rival the climb performance of the Learjet 60.

The Citation Sovereign was announced at the 1998 NBAA convention, it made its maiden flight in February 2002, and deliveries began in late September 2004. FAA certification was awarded on June 2, 2004. EASA certification came on 31 March 2005.

The improved Sovereign+ was announced at the October 2012 NBAA, it rolled out in early March 2013, first flew in April, and began deliveries on December 23 after certification, at a time when the Sovereign fleet reached 349 and had flown 802,000 hours. Winglets were for a range of 150 to 3,000 nmi (170 to 3,450 mi; 280 to 5,560 km), new PW306D engines with autothrottles provided 5,852 lbf (26.03 kN) of thrust for a 458 kn (527 mph; 848 km/h) top speed and a FL450 direct climb, full fuel payload was increased and the Garmin G5000 replaced the avionics.

In March 2021, Cessna announced that Sovereign+ production had ended to reduce market overlap between it and the similarly capable but more recently developed Citation Latitude and Citation Longitude. 349 Sovereign and 94 Sovereign+ aircraft were produced.

== Design ==
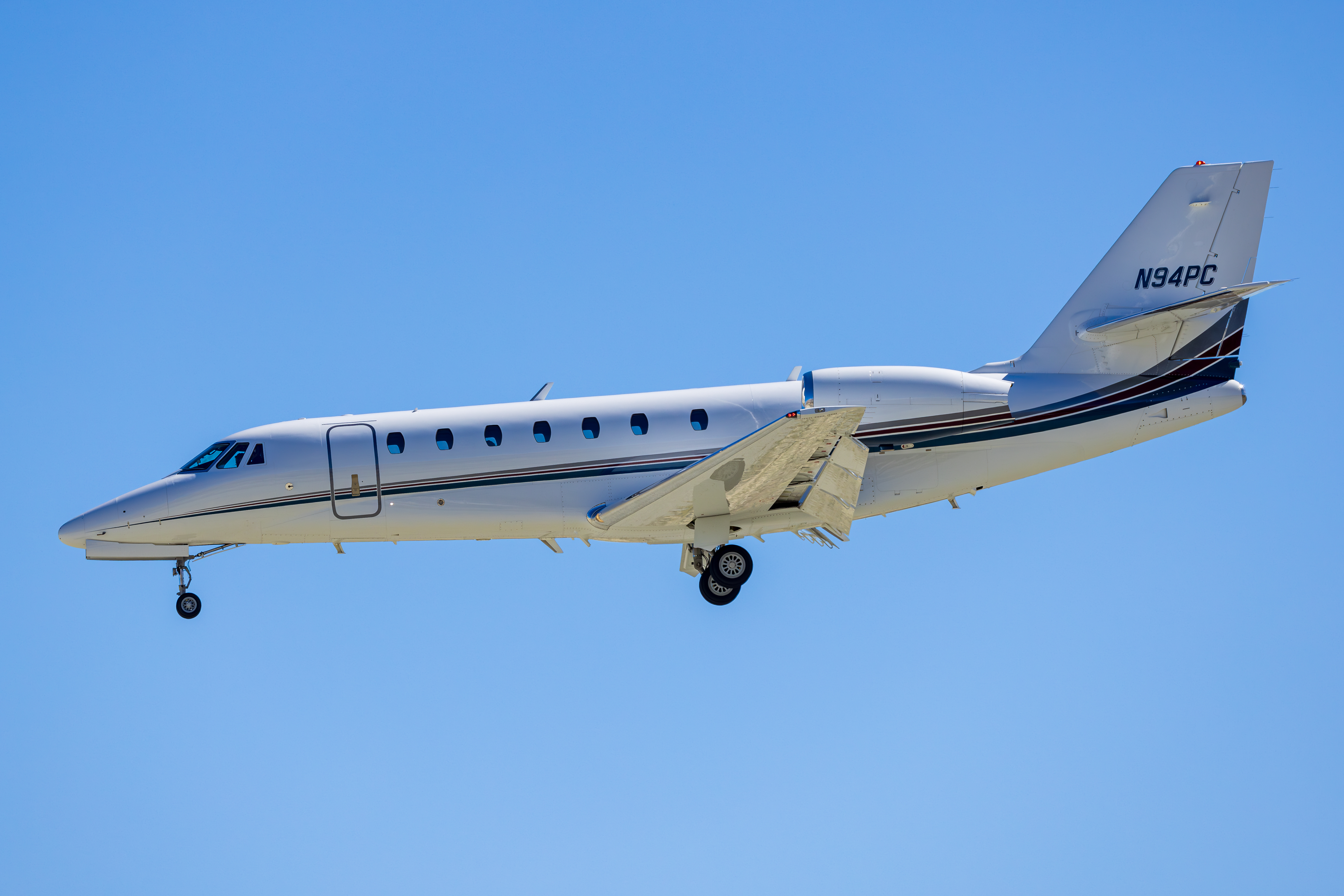
A Citation Sovereign landing at Palm Springs International Airport, 2023

The Citation Excel fuselage was stretched for a 6.6 ft (2.0 m) longer cabin and joined with a large, newly designed 515.9 sq ft (47.93 m^{2}) wing with large trailing edge flaps for good runway performance, 16.3° wing sweep and a relatively high critical Mach number for efficient 445 kn (512 mph; 824 km/h) TAS cruise. It is powered by 5,770 lbf (25.7 kN) Pratt & Whitney Canada PW306C engines, derated from the Gulfstream G200 or Do 328JET, and uses Honeywell Primus Epic glass cockpit avionics with four LCD screens. The cabin maintains a 7,200 ft (2,200 m) altitude with the 9.3 psi (0.64 bar) pressurization and typically comprises double-club seating for eight, two more than the Gulfstream G150, plus a side facing seat, and can accommodate up to 11.

It can carry a full fuel payload of 1,000–1,200 lb (450–540 kg) and can fly 2,840 nmi (5,260 km; 3,270 mi) at a block speed of 406 kn (467 mph; 752 km/h). It can take off at 3,640 ft (1,110 m) and climb to FL410 in 19 min and to FL430 in 26 min. It travels 400 nmi (740 km; 460 mi) in the first hour while burning 2,000 lb (910 kg) at FL410, 420 nmi (780 km) the second hour with 1,550 and 1,400 lb (700 and 640 kg) the third hour at FL430. At a weight of 10,505 kg (23,160 lb) and ISA -5 °C, it burns 653 kg (1,440 lb) per hour at Mach 0.778 / 441 kn (817 km/h) or 454 kg (1,001 lb)/h at a long-range cruise speed of Mach 0.634 / 360 kn (670 km/h).

== Operations ==
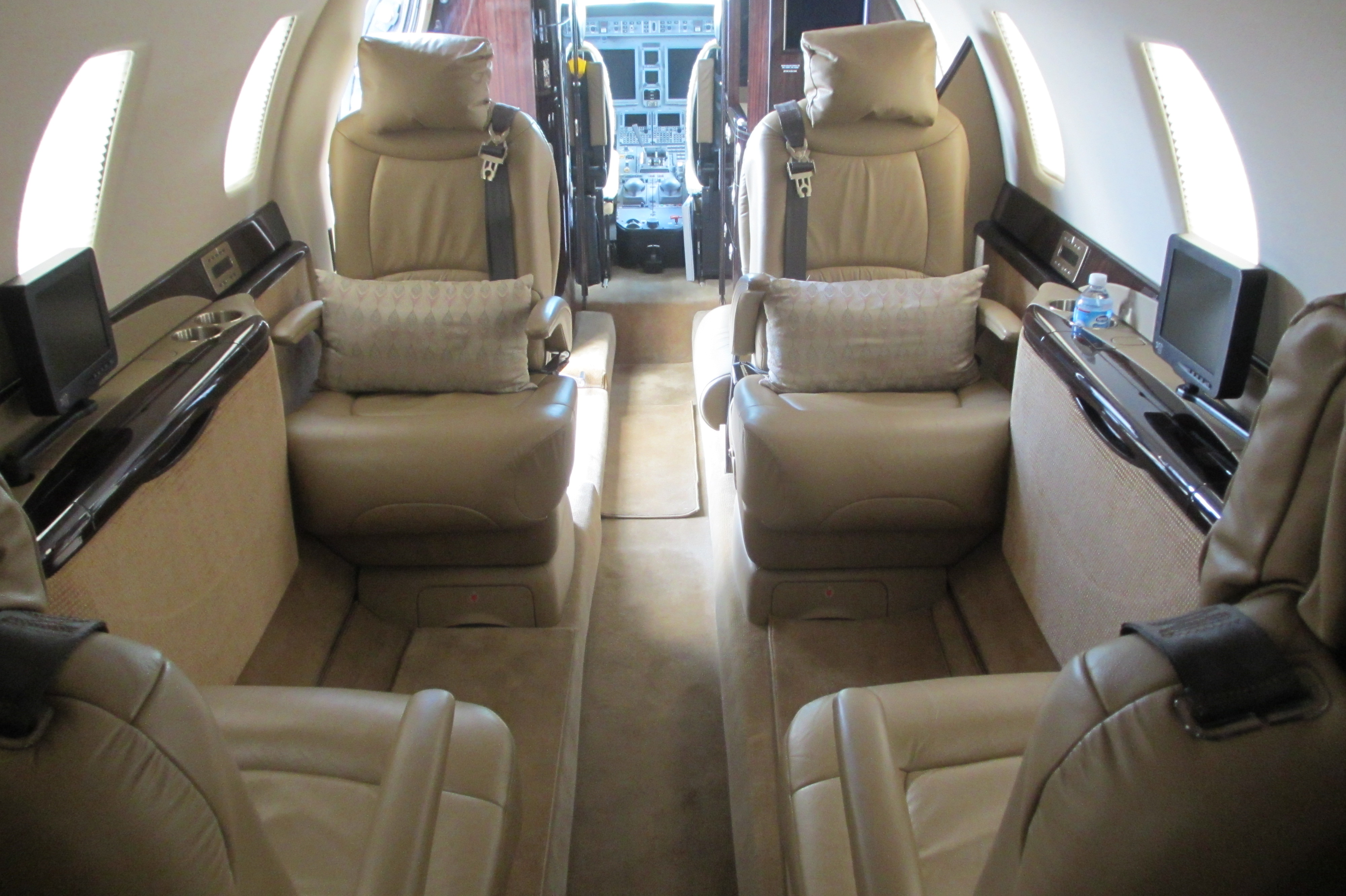
Cabin club seating

Basic maintenance is due at 400 hr or every 12 months and dispatch reliability is over 99%. The Learjet 60 cruises faster with less fuel but its cabin is smaller, the slower Hawker 900XP has 100 mi (87 nmi; 160 km) less range and a wider but shorter cabin like the Gulfstream G150 which has more range, speed and fuel economy. In 2017, the Sovereign were sold from $5 to $9 million for early 2004 models to 2013 aircraft.

In 2013, two-thirds of the fleet was in the U.S. with NetJets as its largest operator with 44. In Americas, 20 were in Brazil, 12 in Canada and eight in Mexico. In Europe, ten were in U.K., nine in Germany, three in Czechia and in Austria, two in the Netherlands. In Africa, eight were in Egypt, four in South Africa and one in Morocco. In Asia, eight were in Turkey, five in China, three in Australia and one in Jordan. Most corporate operators fly the aircraft 350- to 400-hr. per year, less for individuals while fractional ownership and air charter aircraft may be used 1,200 hr. per year.

== Operators ==
Japan

- Japanese Air Self Defense Force - Three U-680A Citation Sovereigns for flight inspection missions, to replace NAMC YS-11s in same role.

Paraguay

- Paraguayan Air Force - One Citation Sovereign 680 in service as a VIP transport since 2019; serves as the Paraguayan presidential aircraft.

Mexico

- Mexican Air Force / Pemex - One Citation Sovereign 680 in service for strategic vigilance of petroleum ducts since 2014.

== Specifications (Citation Sovereign+) ==
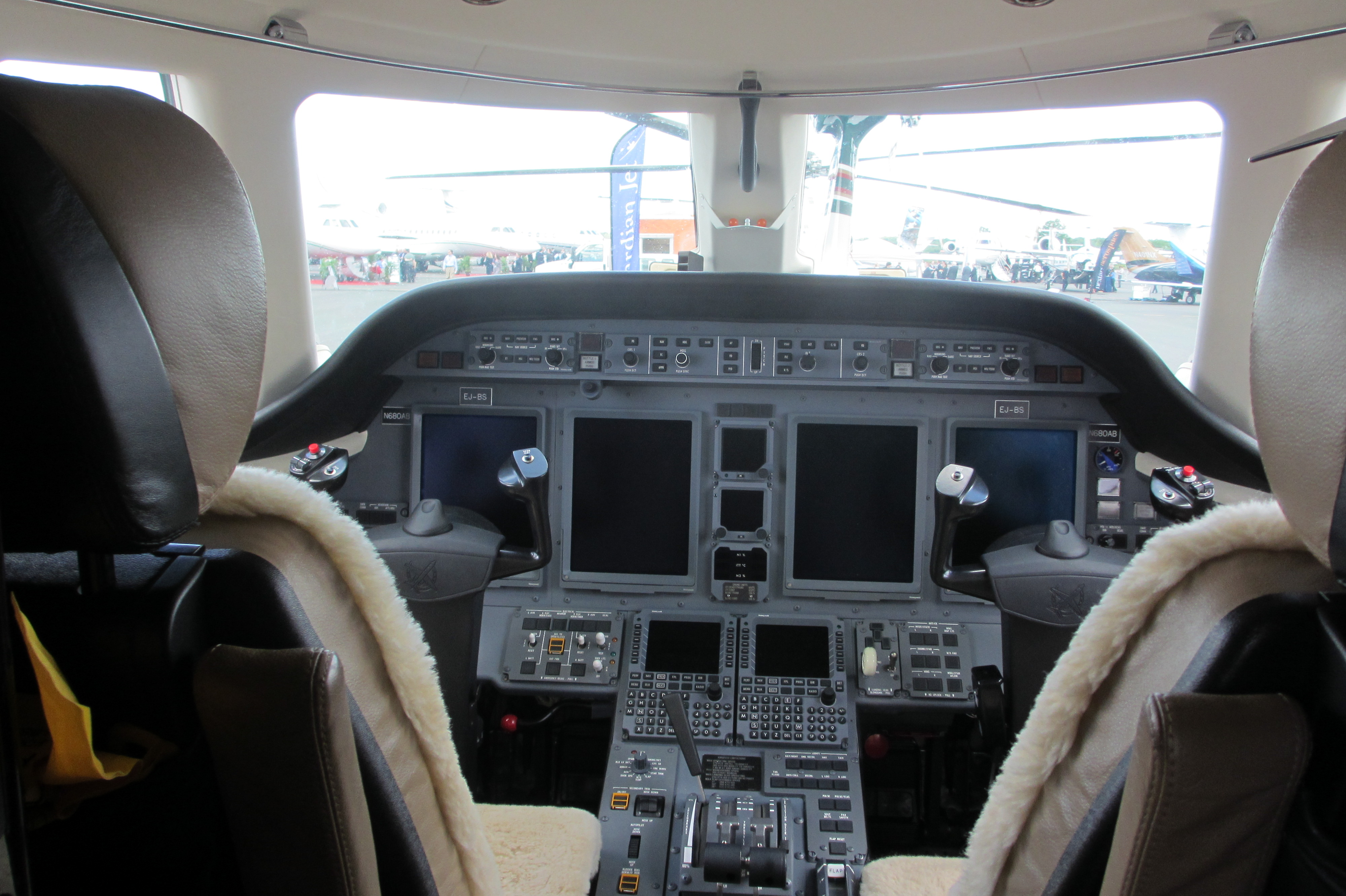
Glass cockpit with four LCD screens

Data from Cessna.

General characteristics

- Crew: 2
- Capacity: 12 passengers / 2,765 lb (1,254 kg) payload
- Length: 63 ft 6 in (19.35 m)
- Wingspan: 72 ft 4 in (22.04 m)
- Height: 20 ft 4 in (6.20 m)
- Wing area: 543 sq ft (50.4 m^{2})
- Aspect ratio: 9.64
- Empty weight: 18,235 lb (8,271 kg)
- Max takeoff weight: 30,775 lb (13,959 kg)
- Fuel capacity: 11,390 lb (5,166 kg) / 1,700 gal (6,435 L)
- Cabin: 68 in (1.73 m) height, 66 in (1.68 m) width
- Wing sweep: 16.3°
- Powerplant: 2 × Pratt & Whitney Canada PW306D turbofans, 5,907 lbf (26.28 kN) thrust each

Performance

- Maximum speed: Mach 0.80
- Cruise speed: 460 kn (530 mph, 850 km/h)
- Range: 3,200 nmi (3,700 mi, 5,900 km)
- Service ceiling: 47,000 ft (14,000 m)
- Rate of climb: 4,083 ft/min (20.74 m/s)
- Wing loading: 56.7 lb/sq ft (277 kg/m^{2})
- Takeoff distance: 3,530 ft (1,076 m)
- Landing distance: 2,600 ft (792 m)

== See also ==
Related development

- Cessna Citation series
- Cessna Citation Excel
- Cessna Citation Latitude
- Cessna Citation X

Aircraft of comparable role, configuration, and era

- Bombardier Learjet 60
- Embraer Legacy 450/500 and Praetor 500/600
- Gulfstream G150
- Hawker 900
