= Cessna Citation Latitude =

Mid-size business jet

Model 680A Citation Latitude
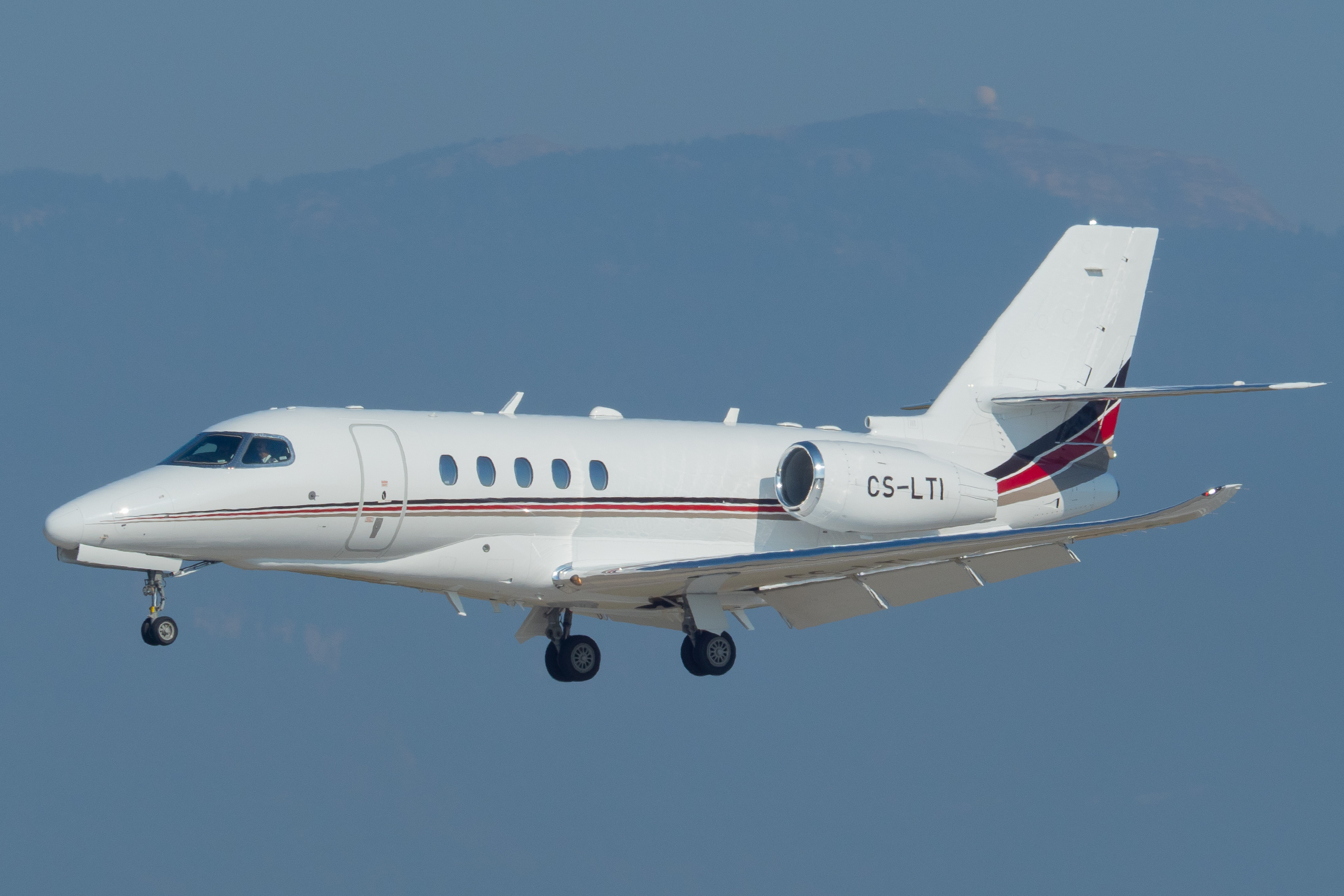

General information
- Type: Corporate jet
- National origin: United States
- Manufacturer: Textron Aviation
- Status: In production
- Number built: 400 by May 2024

History
- Manufactured: 2014–present
- First flight: 18 February 2014
- Developed from: Cessna Citation Sovereign
- Developed into: Cessna Citation Longitude

The Cessna Citation Latitude is a business jet built by Cessna. The Model 680A was announced at the 2011 NBAA convention, the prototype first flew on 18 February 2014, it achieved FAA certification on June 5, 2015, and first deliveries began on August 27. It retains the Model 680 Sovereign wing, twin P&WC PW306D turbofans and cruciform tail and adds a new stand-up circular fuselage with a flat floor, which was kept in the stretched, re-winged, and re-engined Cessna Citation Longitude.

== Development ==
The $14.9 million Citation Latitude was announced by Cessna at the annual NBAA convention in October 2011, between the $12.6 million Citation XLS+ and the $17.5 million Citation Sovereign. The prototype first flew on 18 February 2014 in Wichita, Kansas. Cessna announced on June 5, 2015, that it had achieved FAA certification for the type. On August 27, 2015, Cessna announced the first deliveries had begun. In 2023, its equipped price was $19.775M.

== Design ==
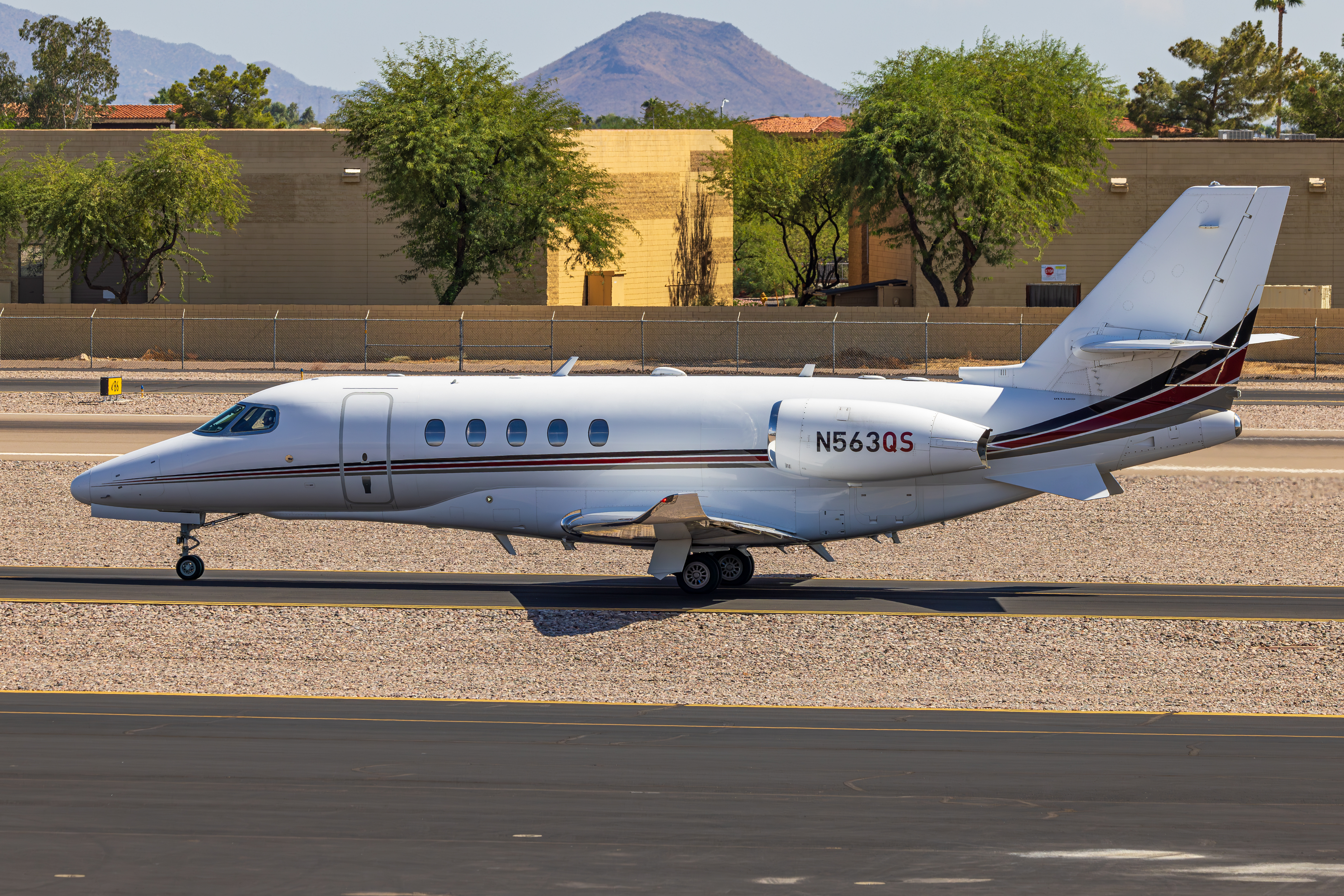
A Cessna Citation Latitude, registration N563QS, departing Scottsdale Airport, Arizona, in October 2023

It keeps the Citation Sovereign wing, twin Pratt & Whitney Canada PW306D turbofans and cruciform tail. Its newly-designed all-metal stand-up circular fuselage has a flat floor and seats nine.

Typical missions are 2.0–2.7 hours and with 400 kn (460 mph; 740 km/h) block speeds and most operators can fly 5–6 hours at Mach 0.72–0.76 for a 2,000–2,400 nmi (2,300–2,800 mi) range, with short takeoff requirements and good hot and high performance. A first hour fuel burn of 2,000–2,500 lb (910–1,130 kg) followed by 1,600–1,900 lb (730–860 kg) the second hour and fuel burn can reach 3,300 lb (1,500 kg) for a 2-hour trip with favorable conditions. It lists for $17.5–18 million typically equipped, the same as the Embraer Legacy 450 with a similar flat floor cabin for club four plus two chairs and over 200 miles more range, 25–30 kn (29–35 mph; 46–56 km/h) higher cruise and fly-by-wire controls. Embraer is firm on list price while Textron discounts the Latitude by up to 20% for $13.5–14 million to sell three times as many aircraft.

== Operational history ==
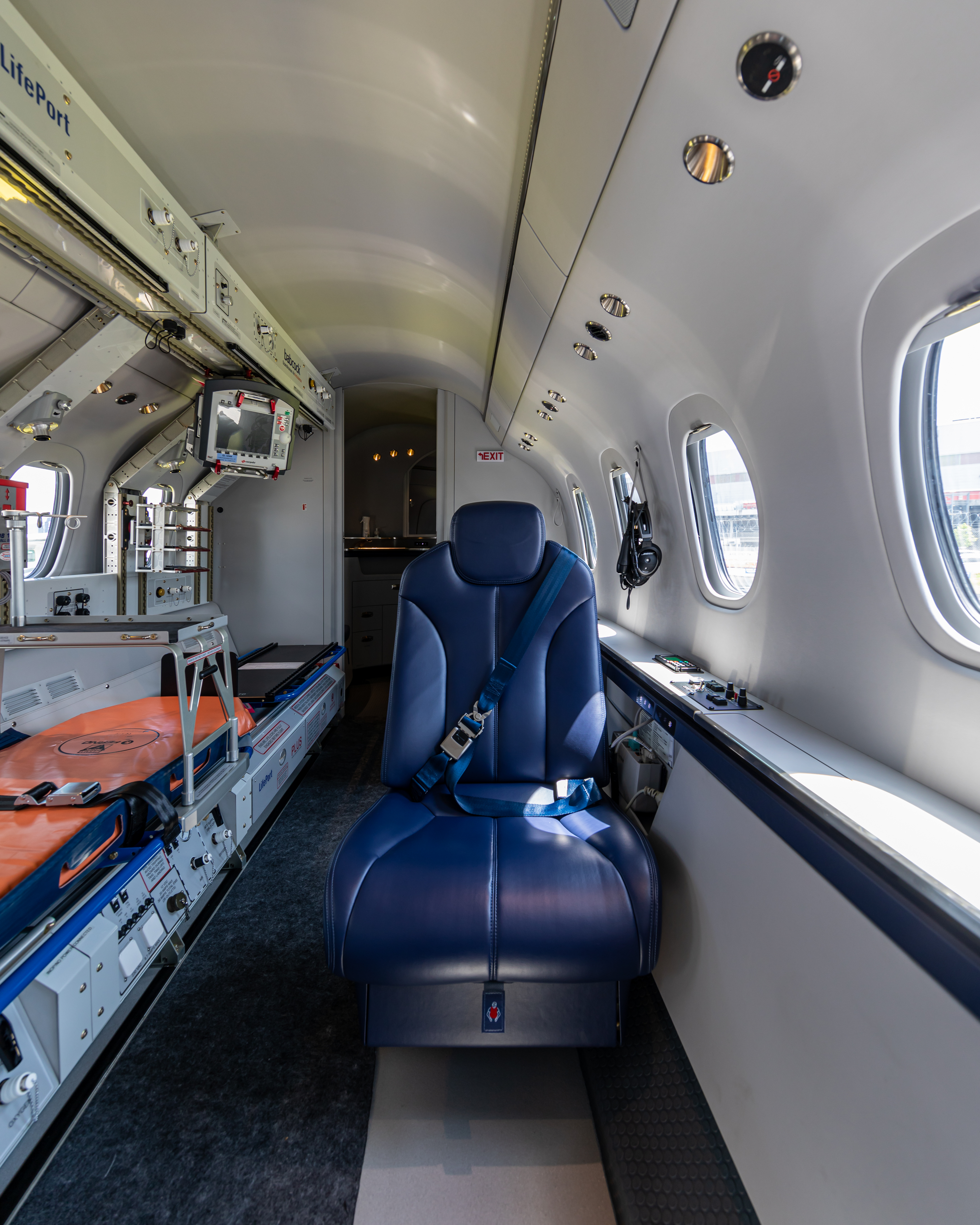
Interior of a Latitude ambulance jet

Deliveries to customers began in the third quarter of 2015 and sixteen had been handed over by the end of the year. By May 2018, almost three years since introduction, 124 had been delivered and had logged 80,000 flight hours.

In June 2018, of 129 delivered, 104 were in the US, three in Mexico, two each are based in China, France and Turkey, and there was one each in Chile, Paraguay, the Philippines, Poland, Scotland and Switzerland. It is used by medium-size corporations, typically flying 200–300 hours per year, and large fleet operators, the largest being NetJets which booked 25 firm orders and 125 options in 2012 and received 44 aircraft for its U.S. operations and 10 for Europe by June 2018, flying theirs over 1,000 hours per year. By mid-September, the 136 delivered had logged 115,000 flight hours, and Textron claimed it was outselling the competition by four to one.

== Specifications (Citation Latitude) ==
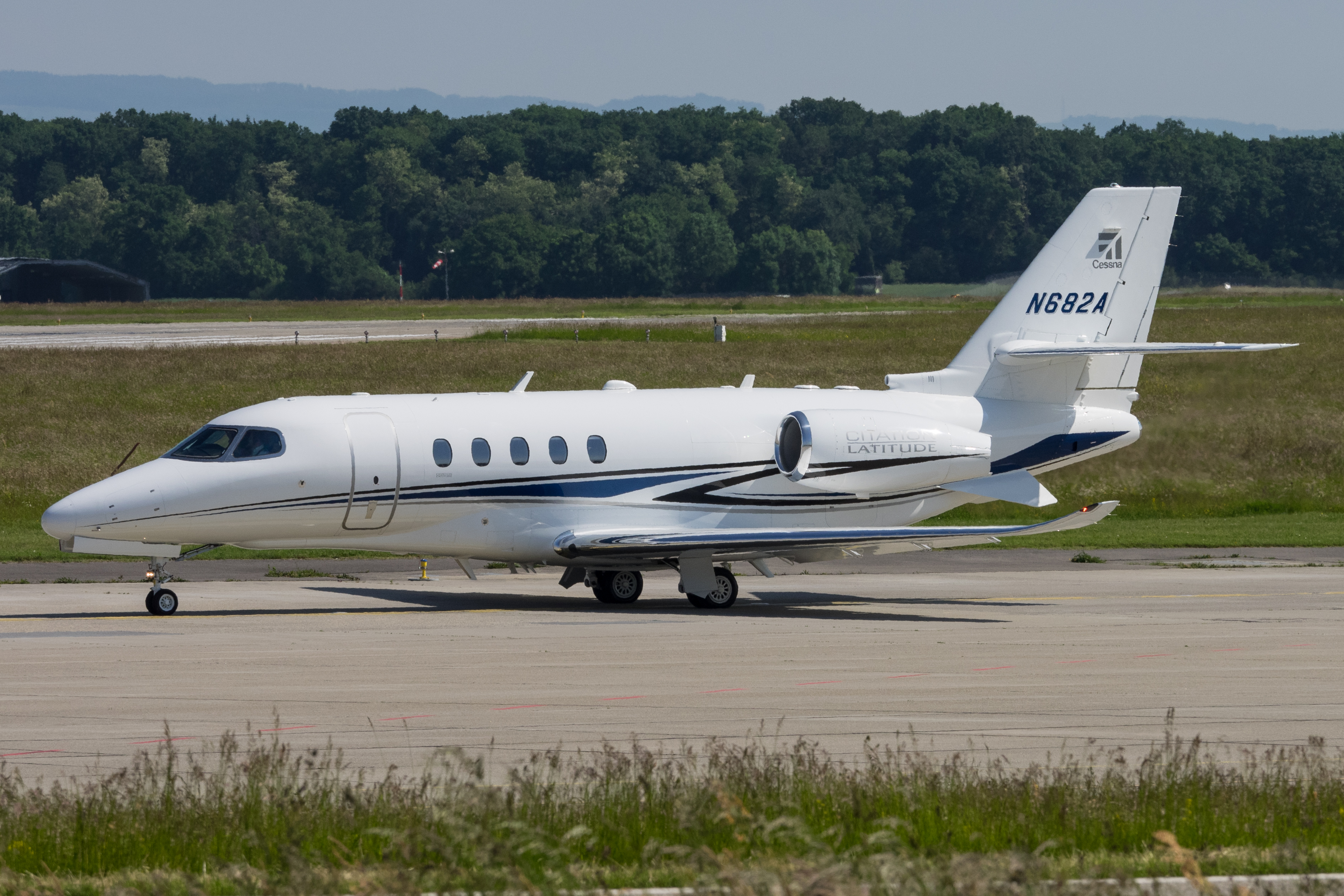
Left side of the aircraft

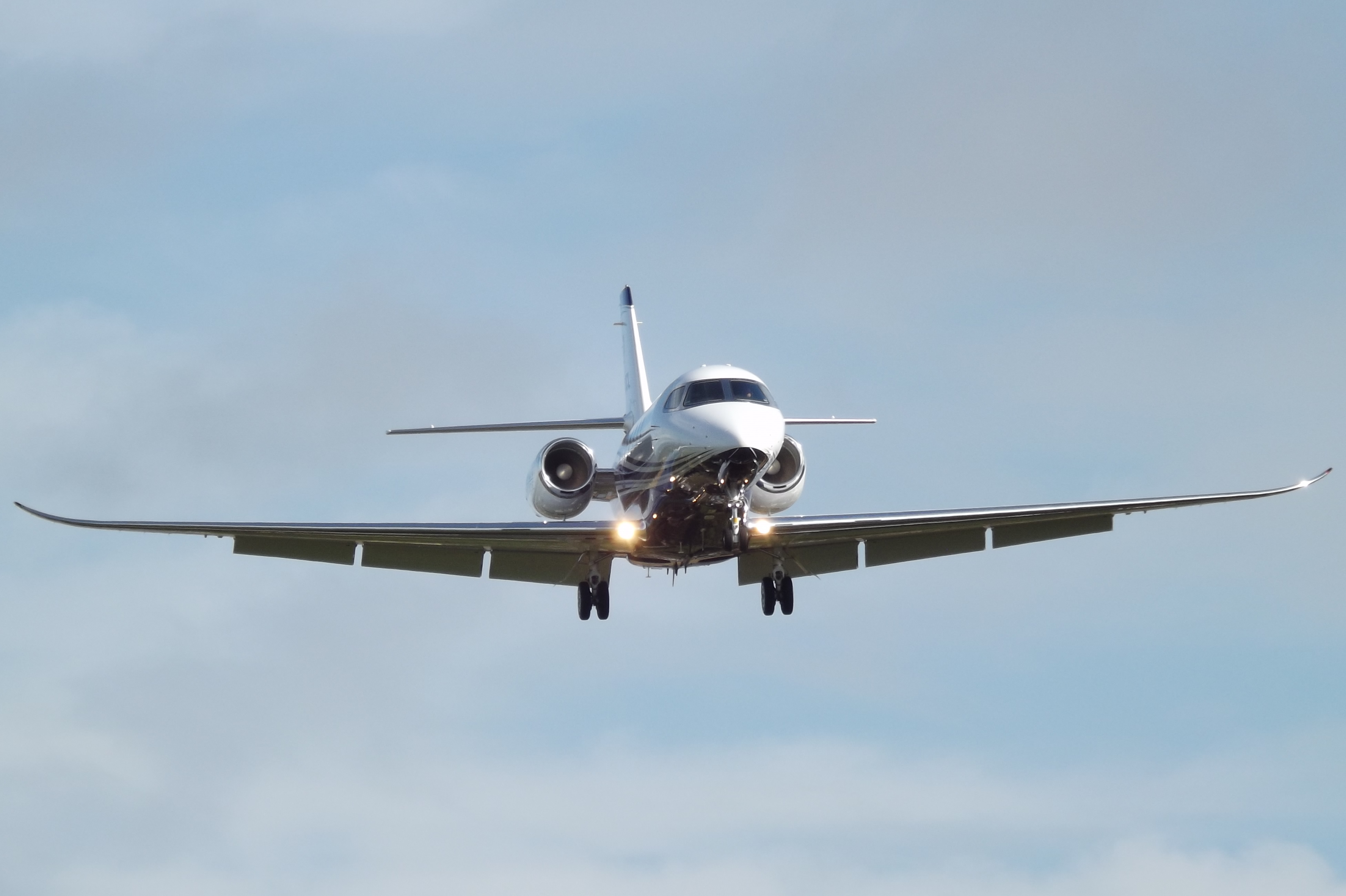
Front view on short final

Data from Cessna

General characteristics

- Crew: 2
- Capacity: 9
- Length: 62 ft 3 in (18.97 m)
- Wingspan: 72 ft 4 in (22.05 m)
- Height: 20 ft 11 in (6.38 m)
- Wing area: 543 sq ft (50.4 m^{2})
- Aspect ratio: 9.64
- Airfoil: 16.3° sweep
- Empty weight: 18,656 lb (8,462 kg)
- Max takeoff weight: 30,800 lb (13,971 kg)
- Fuel capacity: 11,394 lb (5,168 kg)
- Maximum payload: 2,544 lb (1,154 kg)
- Cabin: 72 in (1.83 m) height × 77 in (1.96 m) width
- Powerplant: 2 × Pratt Whitney Canada PW306D1 turbofan, 5,907 lbf (26.28 kN) thrust each

Performance

- Maximum speed: 446 kn (513 mph, 826 km/h) maximum cruise
- Cruise speed: 368 kn (423 mph, 682 km/h) long range
- Never exceed speed: 460 kn (530 mph, 850 km/h) Mach .80
- Range: 2,700 nmi (3,100 mi, 5,000 km) 4 passenger
- Service ceiling: 45,000 ft (13,716 m)
- Rate of climb: 2,313 ft/min (11.75 m/s) to FL370
- Time to altitude: 16 min to FL370
- Wing loading: 56.7 lb/sq ft (277 kg/m^{2}) MTOW
- Thrust/weight: 0.38
- Takeoff: 3,580 ft (1,091 m)
- Landing: 2,480 ft (756 m)

Avionics

- Garmin G5000 flight deck

== See also ==
Related development

- Cessna Citation family
- Cessna Citation Longitude
- Cessna Citation Sovereign

Aircraft of comparable role, configuration, and era

- Embraer Legacy 450/500 and Praetor 500/600
