= Garmin G3000 =

Integrated avionics package

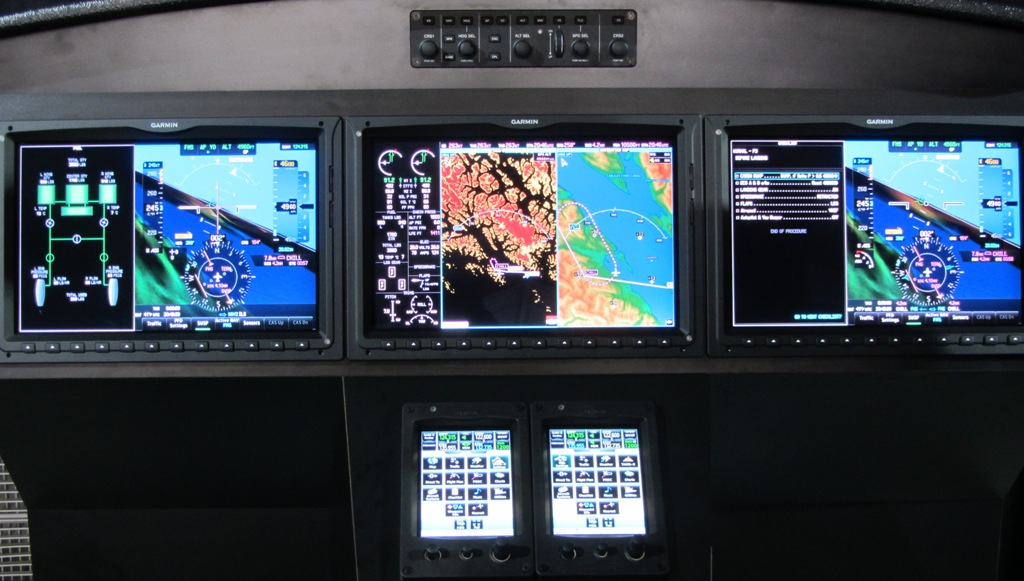
Garmin 3000 Avionics for the Honda Jet

The Garmin G3000 (also G3000H and G2000/G5000) is an avionics interface system designed by Garmin Aviation for light turbine aircraft. The integrated touchscreen system contains multiple glass cockpit displays for operating a synthetic vision system and a three-dimensional rendering of terrain.

On 30 October 2019, Garmin announced that the Piper M600 and Cirrus Vision Jet would become the first general aviation aircraft certified with the company's Emergency Autoland system, designed to automatically land the aircraft in an emergency. The Autoland system was introduced on 18 May 2020 as part of "Autonomí", Garmin's suite of automated, safety-enhancing tools.

== Awards ==
In June 2021, it won the Collier Trophy for "the greatest achievement in aeronautics or astronautics in America" for 2020.

== Applications ==
=== G2000 ===
- Cessna Corvalis TTx
- Cirrus SR20 and SR22/22T G7

=== G3000 / G3000 PRIME ===
- Beta Technologies Alia CX300 (first electric aircraft fitted with the system)
- Cessna Citation CJ3+/M2
- Cirrus Vision SF50
- Daher TBM 930/TBM 940
- Diamond DART Series
- Embraer Phenom 100 and 300
- Heart ES-30
- Honda HA-420 HondaJet
- Piper M600
- Northrop F-5AT
- Pilatus PC-12/47G (PC-12 PRO)

=== G3000H ===
- AW09

=== G5000 / G5000 PRIME ===
- Cessna Citation Latitude
- Cessna Citation Longitude
- Cessna Citation Sovereign+
- Cessna Citation X+
- Cessna Citation XLS (retrofit)
- Hawker 400 (retrofit)
- Learjet 70/75
- Eviation Alice
- Deutsche Aircraft D328eco

=== G5000H ===
- Bell 525 Relentless
