= Honeywell HTF7000 =

Aircraft engine

HTF7000
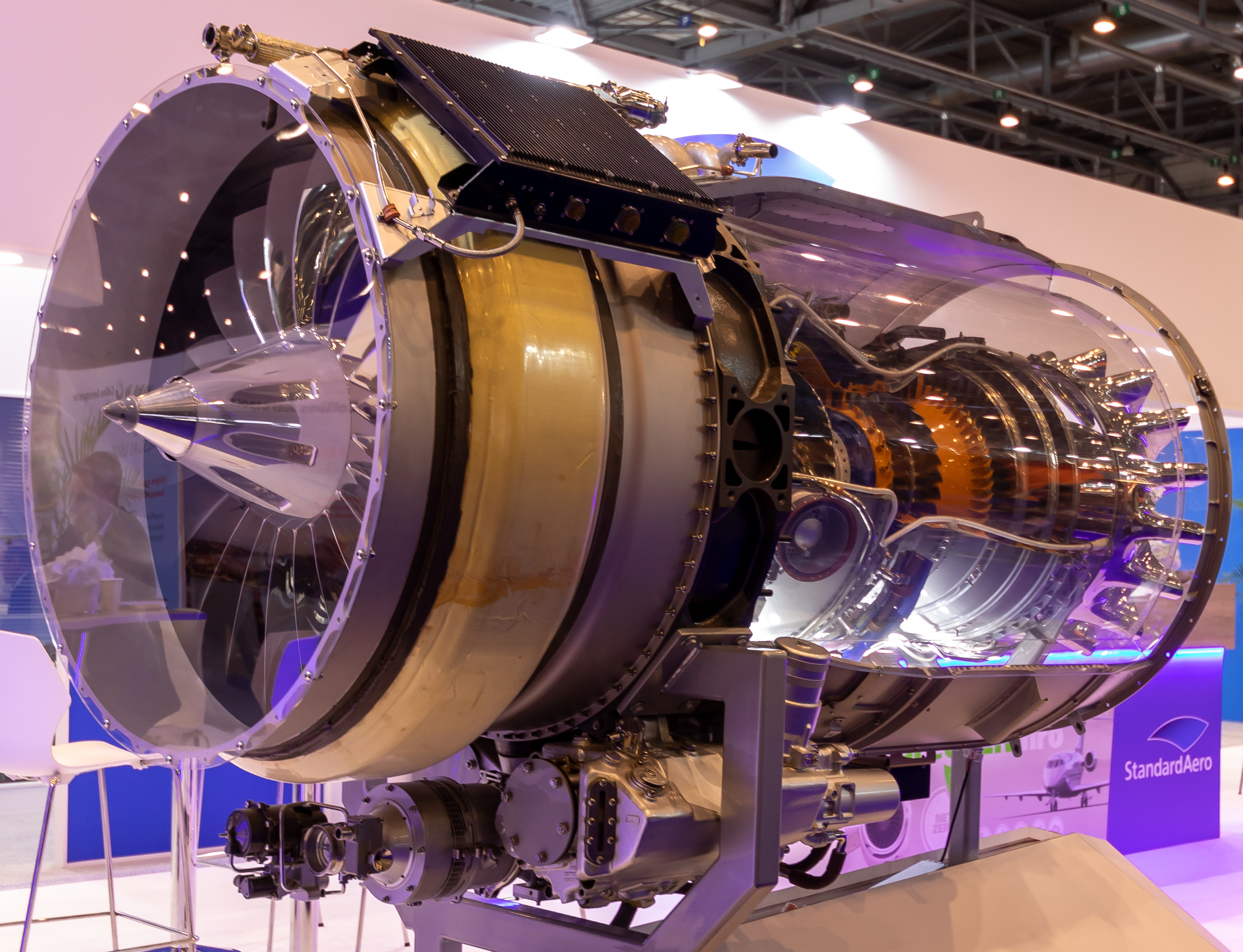
- Type: Turbofan
- National origin: United States
- Manufacturer: Honeywell Aerospace
- First run: 1999
- Major applications: Bombardier Challenger 300/350; Cessna Citation Longitude; Embraer Legacy 500/450; Gulfstream G280
- Number built: Around 3,200; exact unknown

The Honeywell HTF7000 is a turbofan engine produced by Honeywell Aerospace. Rated in the 6,540–7,624 lbf (29.09–33.91 kN) range, the HTF7000 is used on the Bombardier Challenger 300/350, Gulfstream G280, Embraer Legacy 500/450 and the Cessna Citation Longitude. Its architecture could be extended for a range of 8,000 to 10,000 lbf (36 to 44 kN) thrust.

== Operational history ==
The engine was originally designated the AS907, which was changed in 2004 to HTF7000; the AS907 designation is still used for legal and regulatory use. By October 2016, 2.6 million hours had been logged by 1,400 in service engines and it has a 99.9% dispatch reliability rate. Average fuel consumption is about 950 lb. per hour for a 7,765 lbf engine on a G280, to be compared to 875 lb. per hour for a 4,420 lbf TFE731 on a G150. More than 3.5 million flight hours have been logged till October 2017, and the 2,000th engine should be delivered in 2018.

Honeywell maintenance program is $447 for two engines per hour. Borescope inspections extends time between overhaul and some engines have remained installed for up to 10,000 hr. It has line replaceable components installed with hand tools and is designed for condition-based maintenance.

== Variants ==
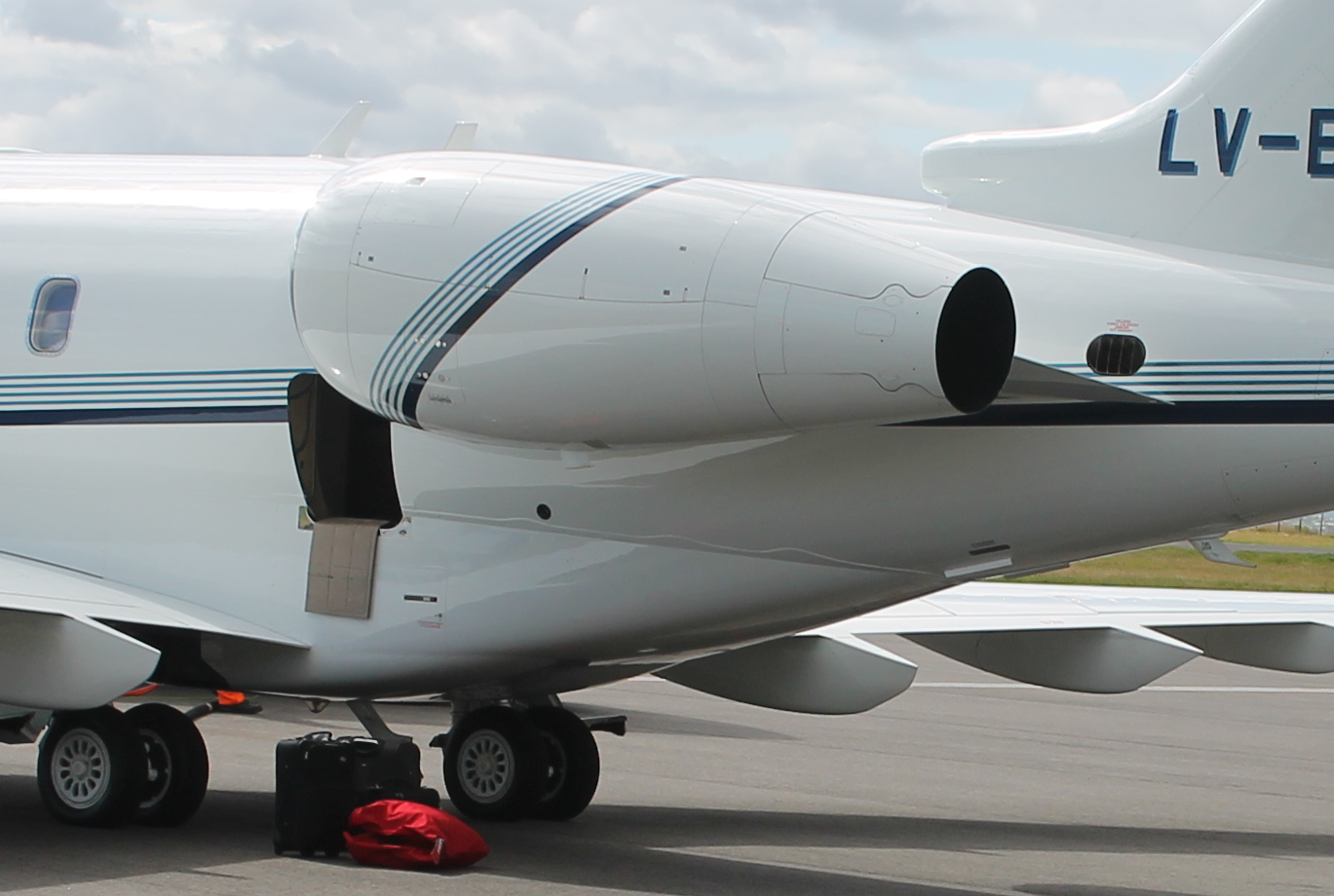
AS907 on a Bombardier Challenger 300

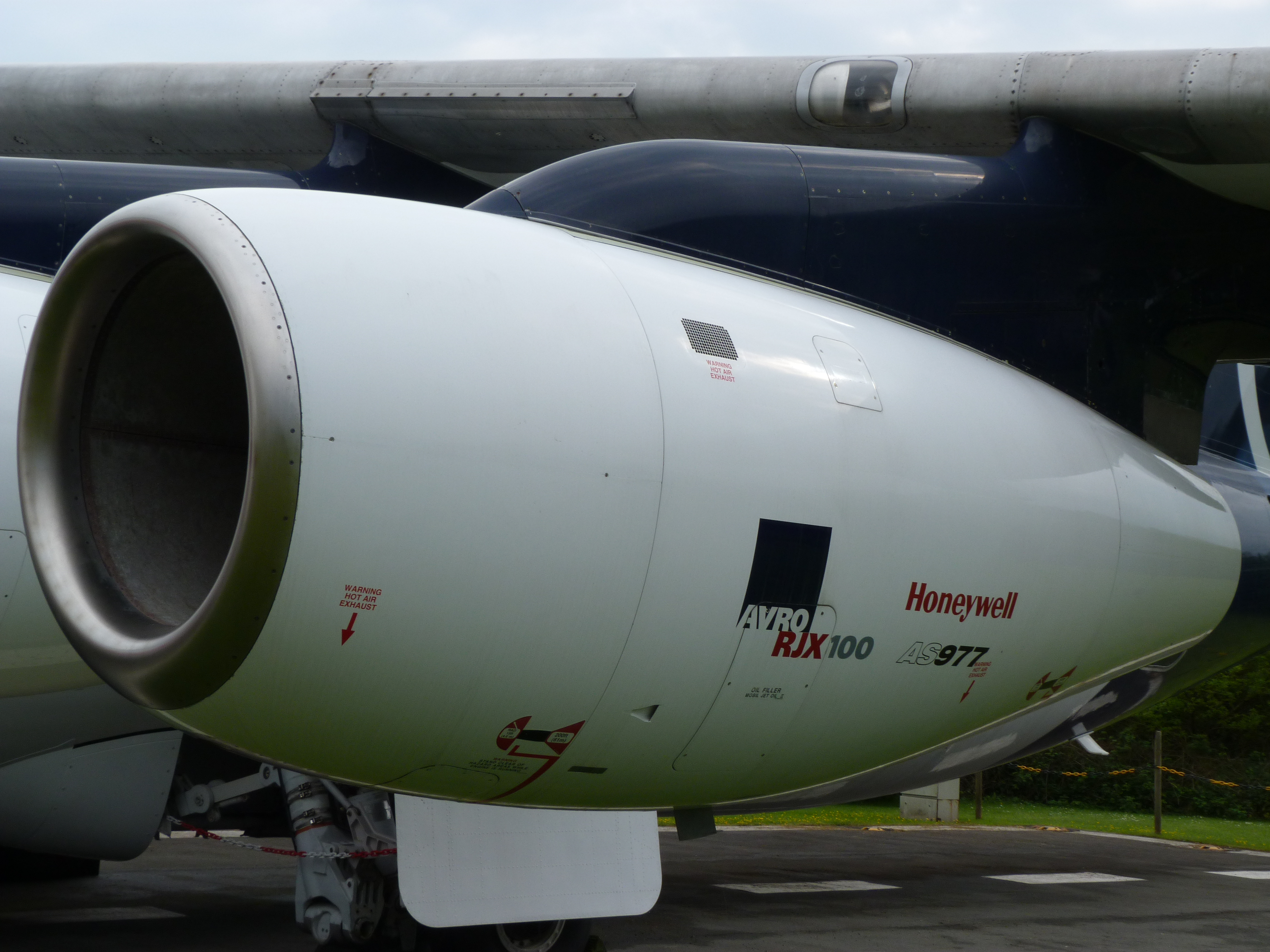
AS977 on an Avro RJX

HTF5000 / AS905
A 5,000 lbf (22 kN; 2,300 kgf) thrust variant, unsuccessfully targeted toward the Dassault Falcon 7X.

HTF7000 / AS907-1-1A
6,826 lbf (30.36 kN) original variant of the engine. Developed for the Bombardier Challenger 300.

AS977
Higher thrust variant of the AS907, designed at the same time, intended to power BAE System's Avro RJX. The aircraft was cancelled after three airframes were built and flown; subsequently this variant never entered production.

HTF7250G / AS907-2-1G
7,624 lbf (33.91 kN) variant developed for use on the Gulfstream G280.

HTF7350 / AS907-2-1A
7,323 lbf (32.57 kN) Variant developed for use on the Bombardier Challenger 350.

HTF7500E / AS907-3-1E
6,540–7,036 lbf (29.09–31.30 kN) variant developed for the Embraer Legacy 500/450 business jets and the Praetor 500/600.

HTF7700L / AS907-2-1S
7,550 lbf (33.6 kN) for the Cessna Citation Longitude.

HTF10000
A 10,000 lbf (44 kN; 4,500 kgf) nominal thrust variant.

== Applications ==
- Bombardier Challenger 300/350
- Cessna Citation Longitude
- Gulfstream G280
- Embraer Legacy 500/450

== Specifications ==
Data from FAA.

==== General characteristics ====
- Type: Turbofan
- Length: 92.4 in (234.7 cm)
- Diameter: 34.2 in (87 cm) fan
- Dry weight: 1,514–1,534 lb (687–696 kg)

==== Components ====
- Compressor: 22 internally reinforced blades fan, 16:1 pressure ratio HP: four stage axial + one stage centrifugal
- Combustors: Annular
- Turbine: Two stage HP turbine, three stage LP turbine
- Oil system: Pressure spray with scavenge and dry sump

==== Performance ====
- Maximum thrust: 6,944–7,638 lbf (30.89–33.98 kN)
- Cruise thrust: 1,910 lbf (8.5 kN)
- Overall pressure ratio: 28.2
- Bypass ratio: 4.4:1
- Fuel consumption: 950 lb/h (430 kg/h)
- Specific fuel consumption: Static sea level: 0.42 lb/(lbf⋅h) (12 g/(kN⋅s)); Cruise: 0.642 lb/(lbf⋅h) (18.2 g/(kN⋅s))
- Power-to-weight ratio: 4.53 - 4.98

== See also ==
Related development

- Honeywell ALF 502/Honeywell LF 507

Comparable engines

- Pratt & Whitney Canada PW300
- Rolls-Royce AE 3007

Related lists

- List of aircraft engines
