= Gulfstream G280 =

Type of aircraft

G280
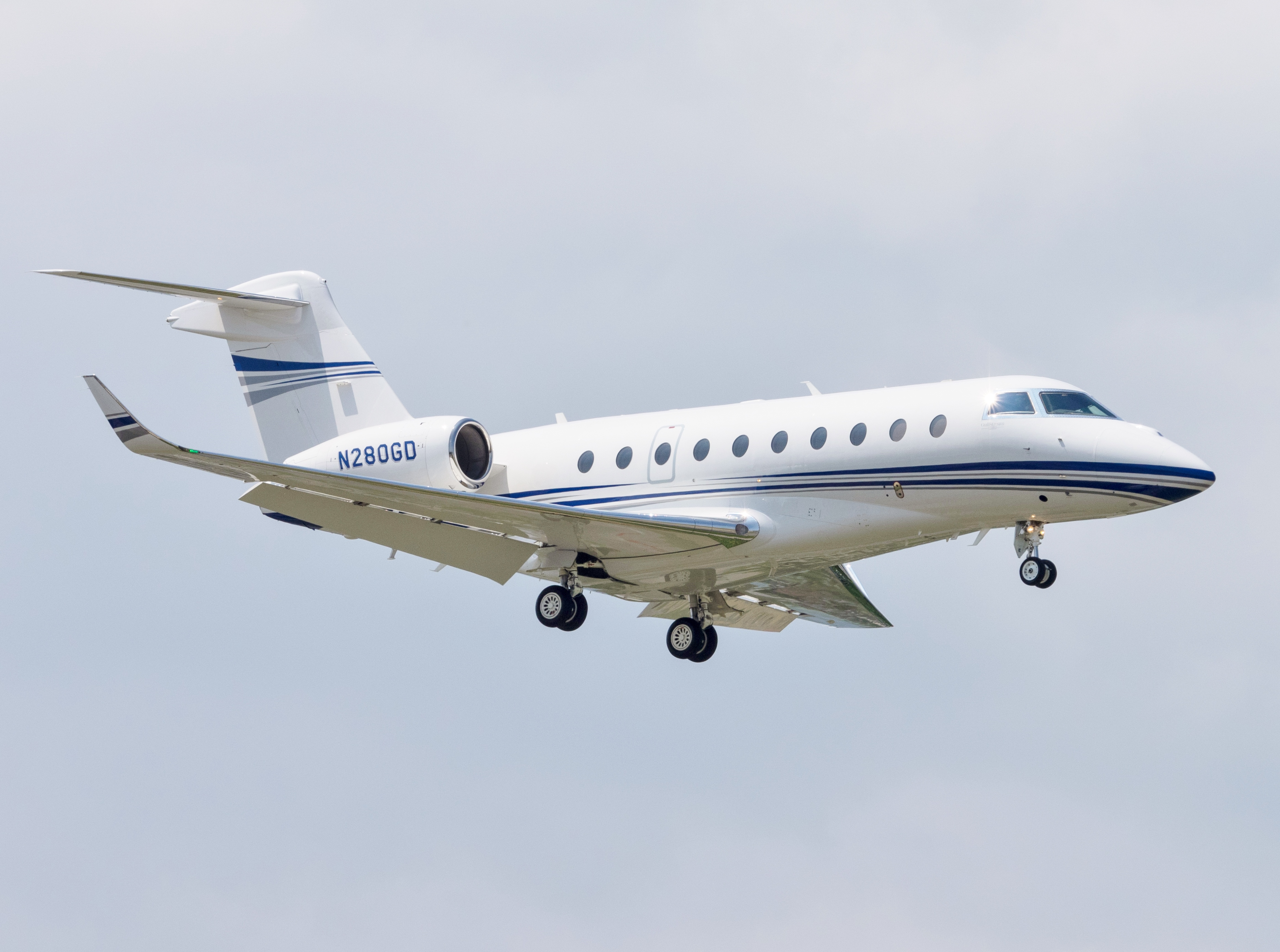
- A Gulfstream G280

General information
- Type: Business jet
- Manufacturer: Gulfstream Aerospace
- Status: In service
- Number built: 300 as of June 2025

History
- Manufactured: 2009–present
- First flight: December 11, 2009
- Developed from: Gulfstream G200

The Gulfstream G280 is a twin-engine business jet built by Israel Aerospace Industries (IAI) for Gulfstream Aerospace. It began delivery to users in 2012.

== Development ==
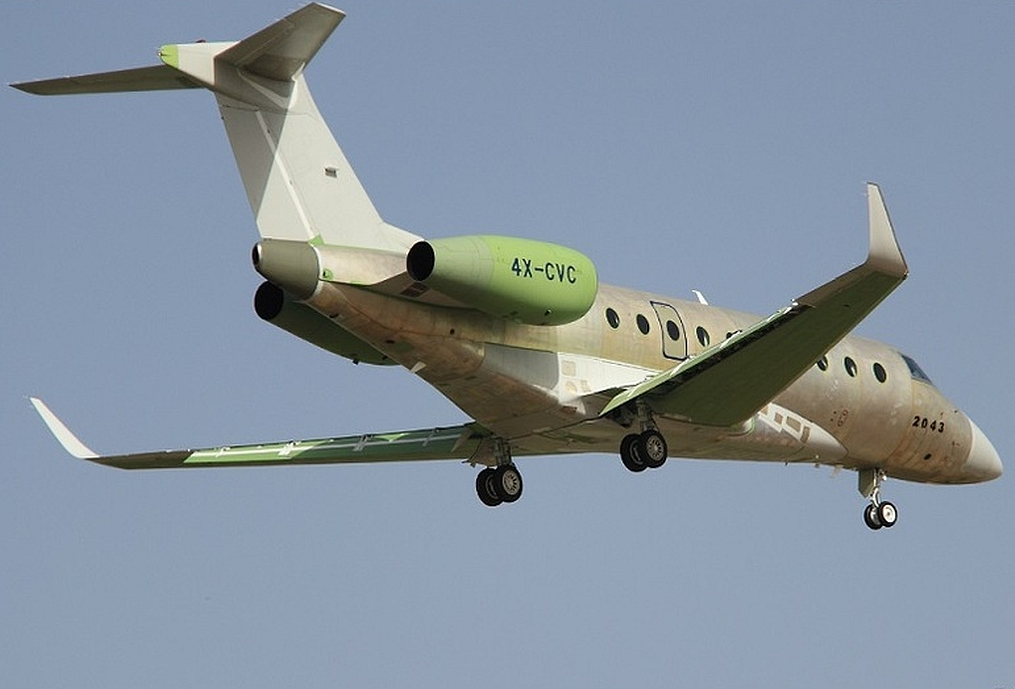
G280 in flight before painting

In 2005, Gulfstream and IAI began designing a follow-on aircraft to the Gulfstream G200. The new model, named G250, was launched in 2008. Planned improvements included new glass cockpit and engines, larger wing, and heated leading edges.

The G250 took its maiden flight on December 11, 2009, in Tel Aviv, Israel. In July 2011, the G250 was renamed G280, as the company had "determined that G280 is a more amenable number sequence [than G250] in certain cultures." In Mandarin, the number 250 can be translated as "stupid" or "idiotic".

After the flight test program, the G280 demonstrated a range of 3,600 nmi (6,700 km) at Mach 0.80 with four passengers and NBAA IFR reserves in 2011. It can fly from London to New York or Singapore to Dubai. Its balanced field length has been reduced to 4,750 feet (1,450 m) from the G200's 4,960 feet (1,510 m).

The G280 was provisionally certified in December 2011 by Israel. In July 2012, the US FAA released a report with conditions to ensure no security gaps in the G280's electronic systems. It received full certification from Israel and the US on September 4, 2012. In 2021, its equipped price was $24.5M.

Gulfstream unveiled the G300, an updated version of the G280, on 30 September, 2025. The updated aircraft flew for the first time on December 5, 2025.

== Design ==
The aerodynamic design of its wing and empennage, and design of the interior were performed by Gulfstream; detailed design was performed by IAI to Gulfstream's requirements. It is a Gulfstream designed aircraft under a new type certificate.

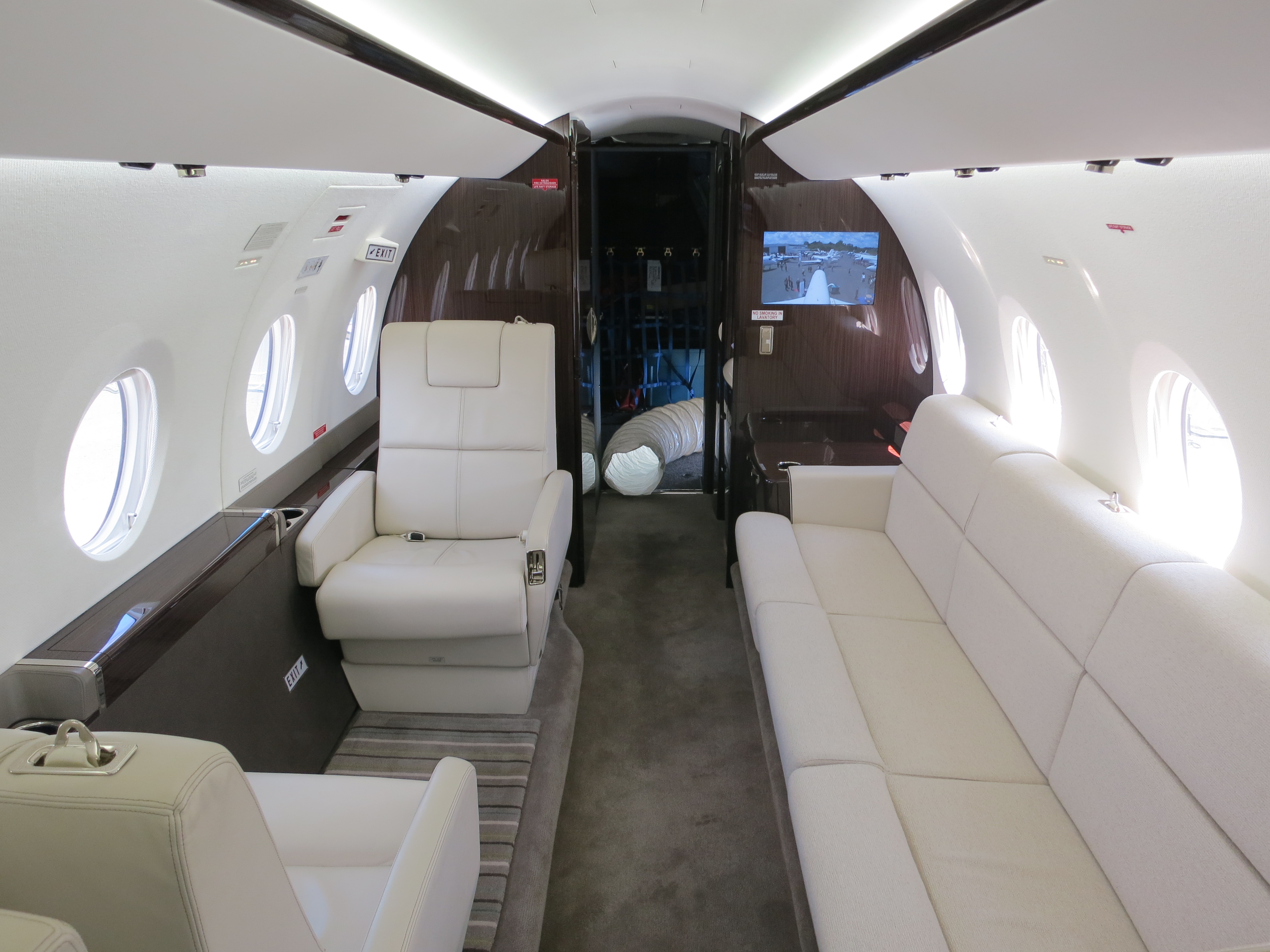
G280 cabin

The aircraft has several improvements, among them increased cabin length (external fuselage dimensions remain unchanged; the rear fuselage fuel tank was eliminated to add 17 inches (43 cm) of usable interior area). It has a new HTF7250G engine, new T-tail (with larger horizontal and vertical stabilizers), wing anti-ice provided by engine bleed air, cabin with four more windows and access from the cabin to the baggage compartment. It competes against the Bombardier Challenger 300 and the Cessna Citation X+. The fuselage, empennage and landing gear are manufactured by IAI, the wing by Spirit AeroSystems (now by Triumph Group), and the aircraft is assembled in Israel. It is then ferried to Dallas, Texas, for interior finishing and painting.

Its wing is a new design, using the Gulfstream G550 airfoil, and has a larger area of 495 ft^{2} vs. 369 ft^{2} of the G200. This allows the business jet to climb directly to 43,000 ft (13,000 m). Design cruise for the new airfoil is Mach 0.80, vs. Mach 0.75 for the G200 wing. Flying at an altitude of 41,000 ft (12,000 m) and Mach 0.82 (467 kn or 865 km/h), each engine burns 900 lb (410 kg) of fuel per hour.

== Military operators ==
Philippines

- Philippine Air Force — 1 unit.

== Specifications ==
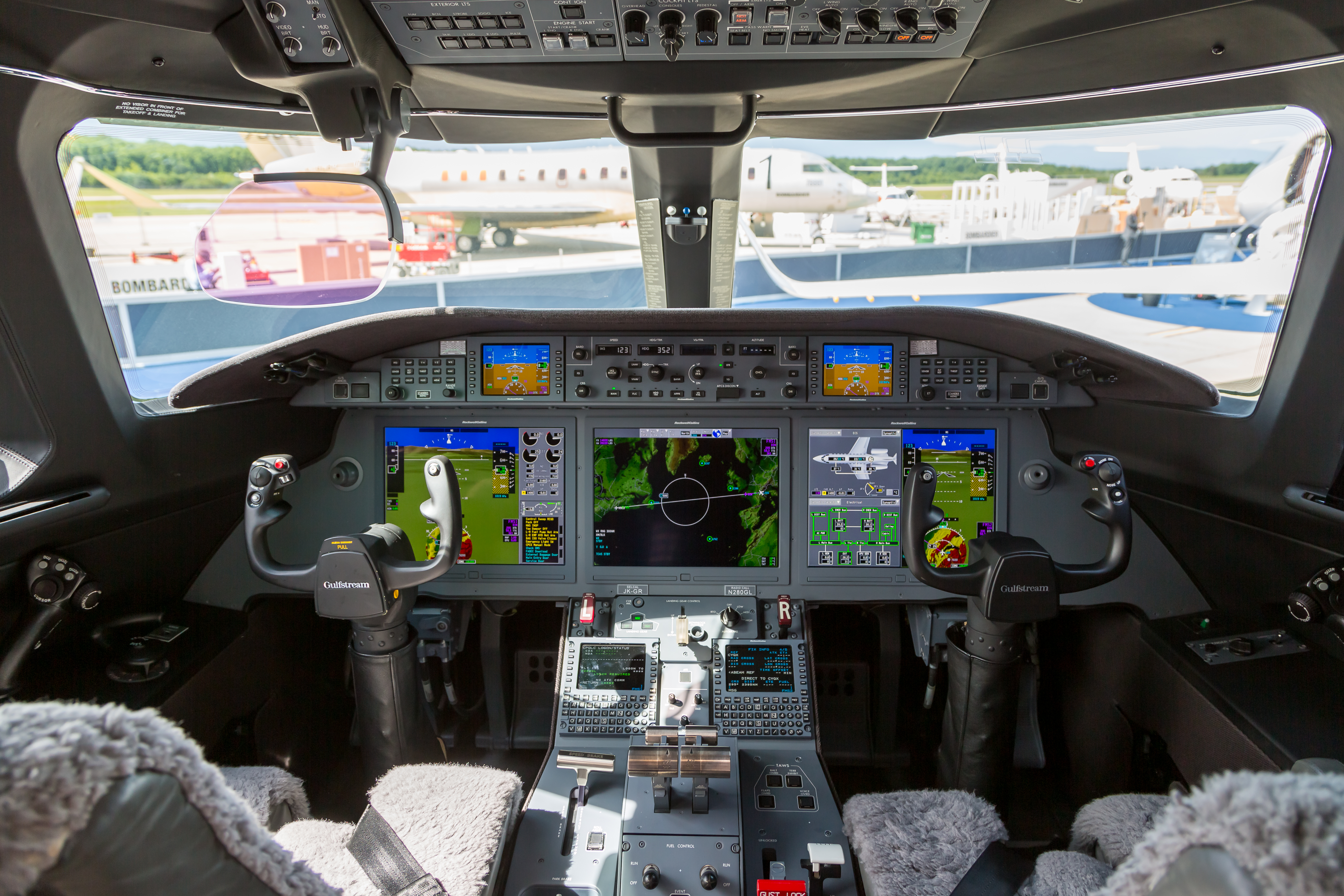
Flight deck

Data from Gulfstream

General characteristics

- Crew: 2
- Capacity: seating for 10 in executive style and 4,050 pounds (1,840 kg) payload
- Length: 66 ft 10 in (20.3 m)
- Wingspan: 63 ft 0 in (19.2 m)
- Height: 21 ft 4 in (6.5 m)
- Wing area: 495 sq ft (46 m^{2})
- Empty weight: 24,150 lb (10,954 kg)
- Max takeoff weight: 39,600 lb (17,960 kg)
- Powerplant: 2 × Honeywell HTF7250G turbofans, 7,624 lbf (33.91 kN) thrust each

Performanceat altitude

- Maximum speed: Mach 0.84
- Cruise speed: 459 kn (528 mph, 850 km/h) normal cruise at altitude
- Range: 3,600 nmi (4,143 mi, 6,667 km) at Mach 0.80 with 4 passengers
- Service ceiling: 45,000 ft (13,716 m)
- Fuel consumption: 1,900 lb. per hour

== See also ==
Related development

- Gulfstream G100
- Gulfstream G200

Aircraft of comparable role, configuration, and era

- Cessna Citation X+
- Bombardier Challenger 350
- Embraer Legacy 450/500 and Praetor 500/600
- Embraer Legacy 600
- Cessna Citation Longitude
