= Textron Aviation =

American general aviation aircraft manufacturer

Textron Aviation Inc.
- Industry: Aerospace
- Founded: 2014; 12 years ago
- Headquarters: Wichita, Kansas, U.S.
- Key people: CEO: Brian Rohloff (2026)
- Products: General aviation and military aircraft Brands: Beechcraft; Cessna; Hawker; Pipistrel
- Owner: Textron
- Website: www.txtav.com

Textron Aviation Inc. is the general aviation business unit of the conglomerate Textron that was formed in March 2014 following the acquisition of Beech Holdings which included the Beechcraft and Hawker Aircraft businesses. The new business unit includes the Textron-owned Cessna. Textron Aviation sells Beechcraft and Cessna-branded aircraft. While no longer selling new Hawker airplanes, Textron Aviation still supports the existing Hawker aircraft fleet through its service centers.

The CEO of Cessna, Scott Ernest, was named as the first CEO of Textron Aviation. In October 2018, Ronald Draper succeeded Ernest to become its second CEO.

== History ==
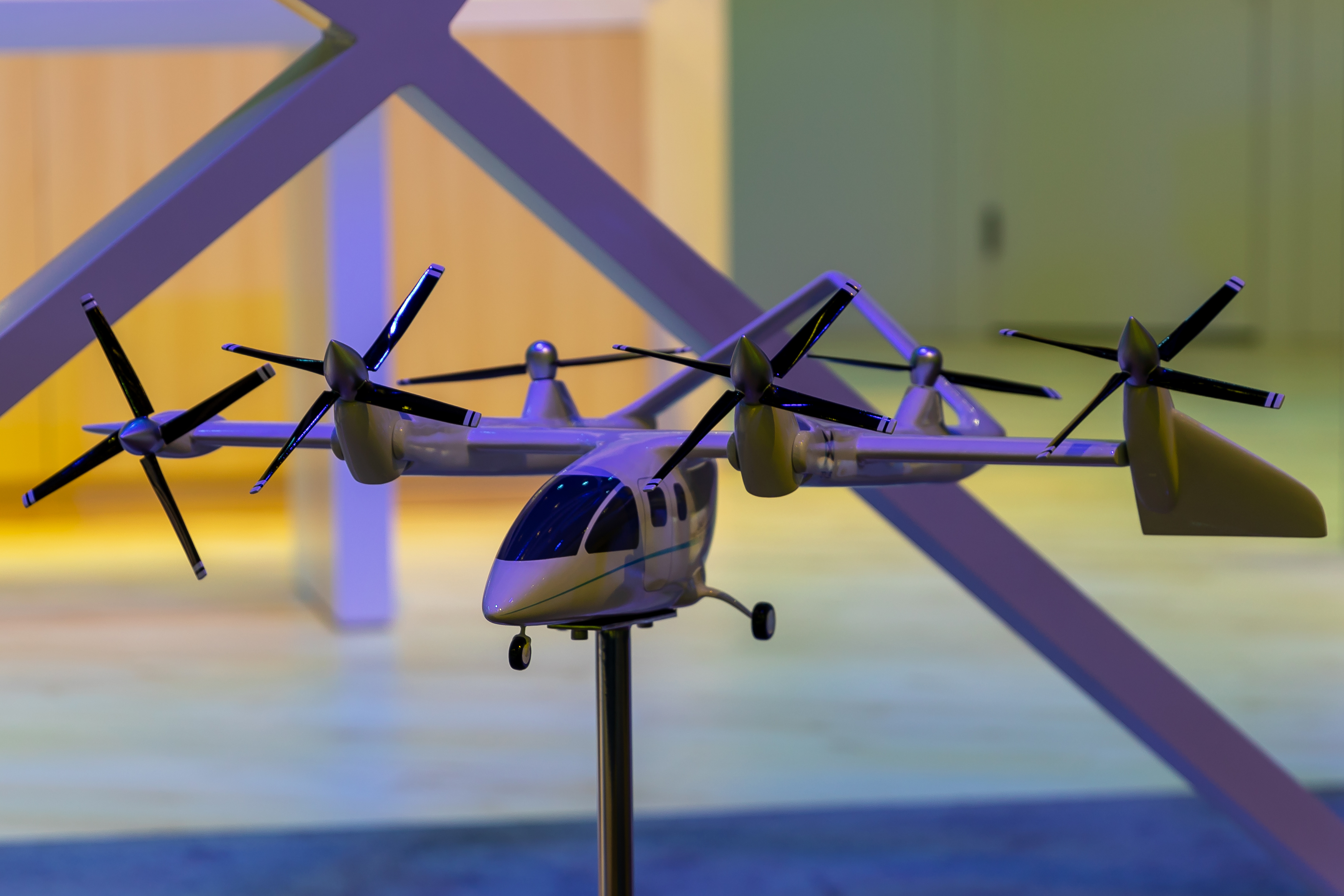
Textron eAviation Nexus Tiltrotor eVTOL model at EBACE 2023

Textron completed its purchase of Beech Holdings in March 2014 for approximately US$1.4 billion in cash. The parent company, Textron, financed the equity purchase and the repayment of Beechcraft's debt in cash, plus its issue of US$600 million in senior notes and a new US$500 million five-year term loan.

Once the purchase was completed on March 14, 2014, Textron combined Beechcraft with its existing Cessna subsidiary to form Textron Aviation and brought all production under the new company name. The old companies became brands of the new company due to their historical significance and name recognition.

In January 2017, the company announced lay-offs as a result of falling business jet and turboprop sales and company profits. Textron CEO Scott Donnelly indicated that customers are seeking pricing levels that the company is not willing to support.

In the first quarter of 2017 company revenues were down US$121 million compared to 2016, as a result of lower sales of military and commercial turboprop aircraft. The company made a first quarter 2017 profit of US$36 million, down from US$73 million in the first quarter of 2016.

Sales of the Cessna 400 had been slow, with only 23 of the model being sold in 2017. In February 2018, the company ceased production of the aircraft.

In April 2022, Textron purchased Slovenian manufacturer Pipistrel to form a new division called Textron eAviation, for electric aircraft development.

In June 2025, Textron secured its first order for the Cessna SkyCourier in Africa, with Algeria's Tassili Travail Aérien purchasing two aeromedical-equipped aircraft for use in passenger transport and medevac missions.

== Products ==
Textron Aviation's various lines of aircraft, including the Cessna single-engined piston and turboprop aircraft and jets, Beechcraft piston and turboprops are seen by the company as complementary to each other and not as competitors. Textron Aviation also produces the Beechcraft T-6 Texan II trainer and AT-6 light attack variant. The company does not produce the Hawker jets, but provides parts support for them.

By 2015, Textron Aviation companies have delivered nearly 251,000 aircraft, exceeding 100 million flight hours, in over 170 countries. It provides aircraft parts and engineering support for them.

=== Aircraft ===
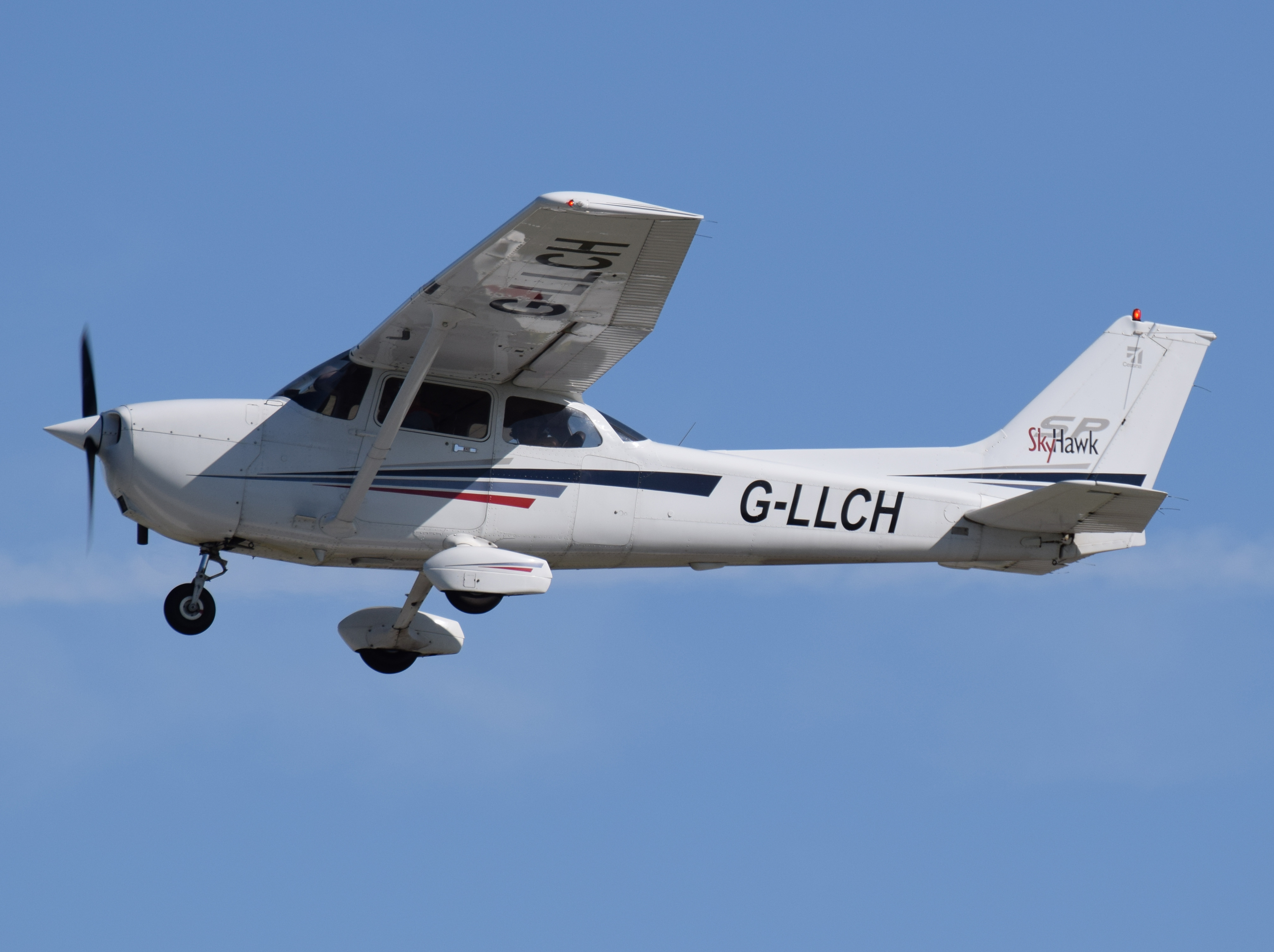
Cessna 172 Skyhawk

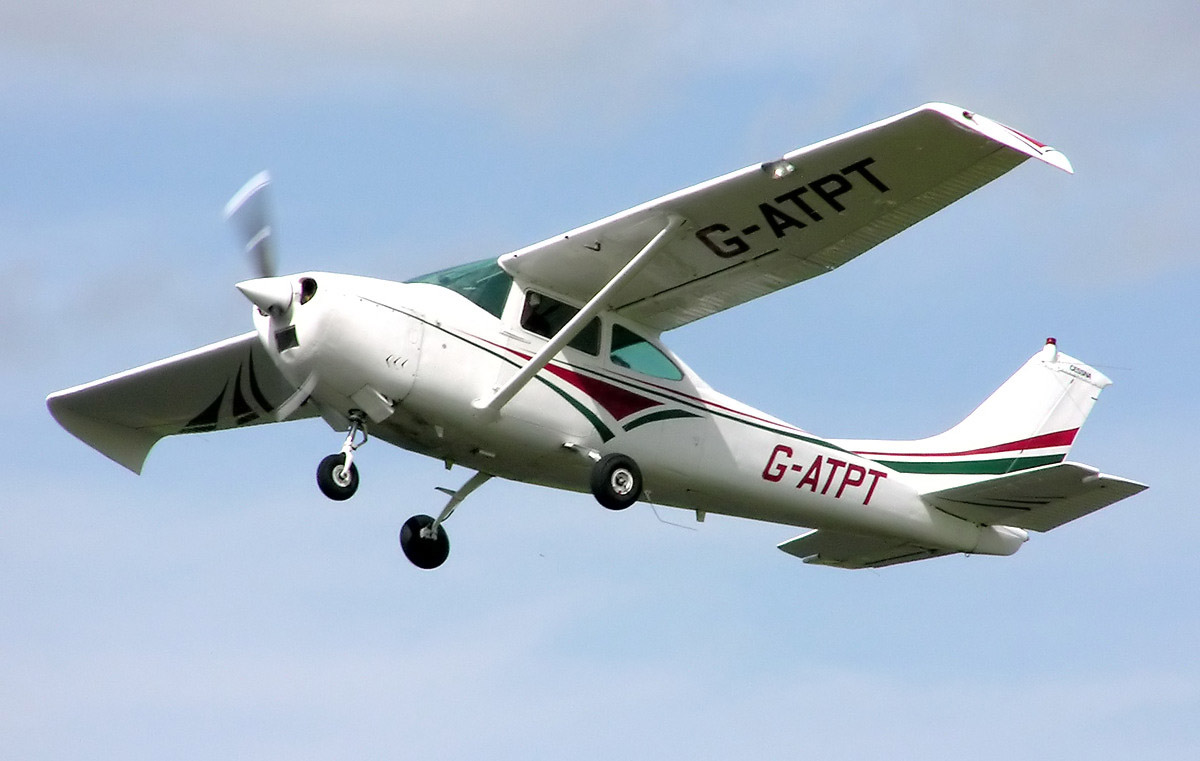
Cessna 182 Skylane

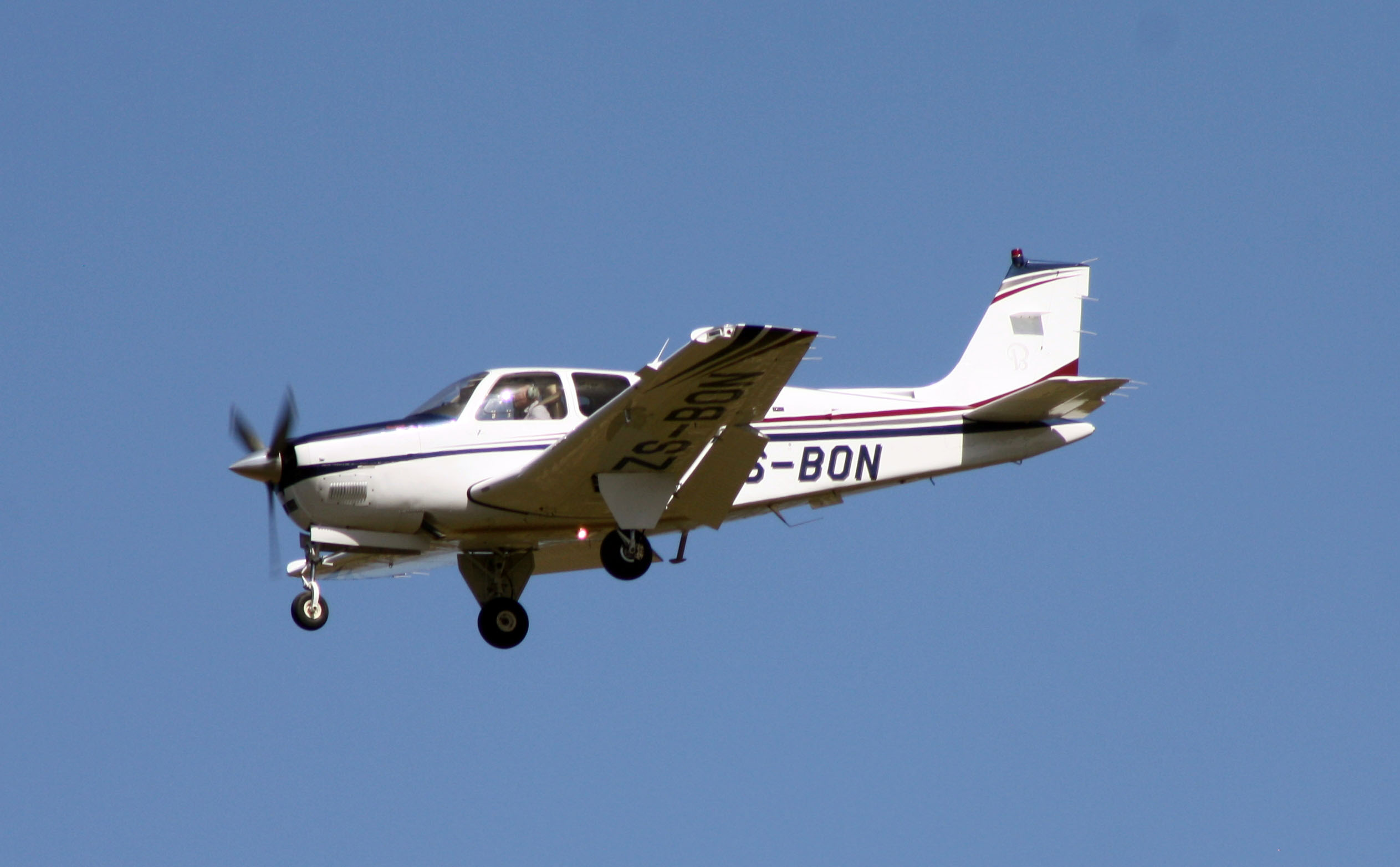
Beechcraft Bonanza

Summary of aircraft built by Textron Aviation
Model name	Original first flight	Number built	Type
Beechcraft G36 Bonanza	1945	17,000	light general aviation aircraft, 6-seat
Beechcraft G58 Baron	1960	6,691	light general aviation aircraft, twin piston
Beechcraft King Air	1963	3,100+	light general aviation aircraft
Beechcraft Super King Air	1972	3,550+	light general aviation aircraft
Beechcraft T-6 Texan II/AT-6	2000	850	military training aircraft/light attack aircraft
Cessna 172	1955	43,000	light general aviation aircraft, 4-seat, 145-180 hp
Cessna 182	1956	23,237	light general aviation aircraft, 4-seat, 227-235 hp
Cessna 206	1962	8,509	light general aviation aircraft, 6 seat
Cessna 208 Caravan	1982	2,500	general aviation aircraft/commuter
Cessna 408 SkyCourier	2020		general aviation aircraft/cargo
Cessna Citation Excel	1996	575	general aviation mid-size jet aircraft
Cessna CitationJet	1991	400	general aviation light jet aircraft
Cessna Citation Latitude	2014		general aviation mid-size jet aircraft
Cessna Citation Longitude	2016		general aviation super mid-size jet aircraft
Cessna Citation M2	2012		general aviation light jet aircraft
Cessna Citation Mustang	2005	425	general aviation very light jet aircraft
Cessna Citation Sovereign	2002	300	general aviation mid-size jet aircraft
Cessna Citation X	1993	330	general aviation long range mid-size jet aircraft
Cessna TTx	2004		light general aviation aircraft, 4-seat, low-wing
