= Gulfstream G200 =

Business jet

G200
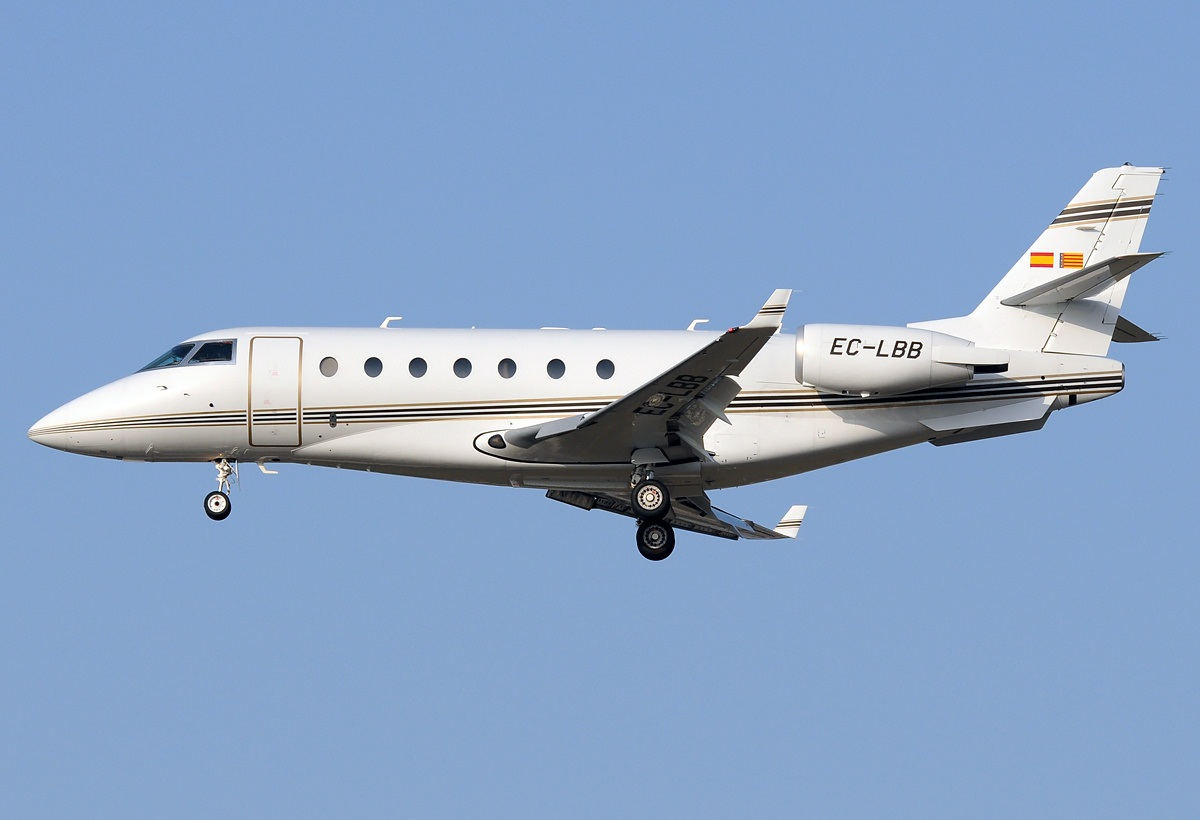
- Gulfstream G200

General information
- Type: Business jet
- Manufacturer: Gulfstream Aerospace
- Status: In service
- Number built: 250

History
- Manufactured: 1997–2011
- Introduction date: 1999
- First flight: December 25, 1997
- Developed from: IAI Astra
- Developed into: Gulfstream G280

The Gulfstream G200, formerly known as the IAI Galaxy, is a twin-engine business jet. It was designed originally by Israel Aerospace Industries (IAI) and was produced by IAI for Gulfstream Aerospace from 1999 through 2011.

== Design and development ==
The G200 was originally named "Astra Galaxy". When Gulfstream Aerospace purchased Galaxy Aerospace in 2001 the model was rebranded as the Gulfstream G200. Israel Aircraft Industries' subsidiary Galaxy Aerospace Inc. began designing the Galaxy in the late 1980s in a risk-sharing partnership with the Soviet aircraft design bureau Yakovlev OKB. The program officially launched in September 1993. Yakovlev handled design and manufacturing of the forward fuselage and empennage. However, the Russian company had trouble meeting agreed production schedules, and the partnership was ended in 1995. This led to another risk-sharing agreement, with EADS Sogerma manufacturing the fuselage and empennage, and IAI being responsible for final assembly and other prime contractor duties.

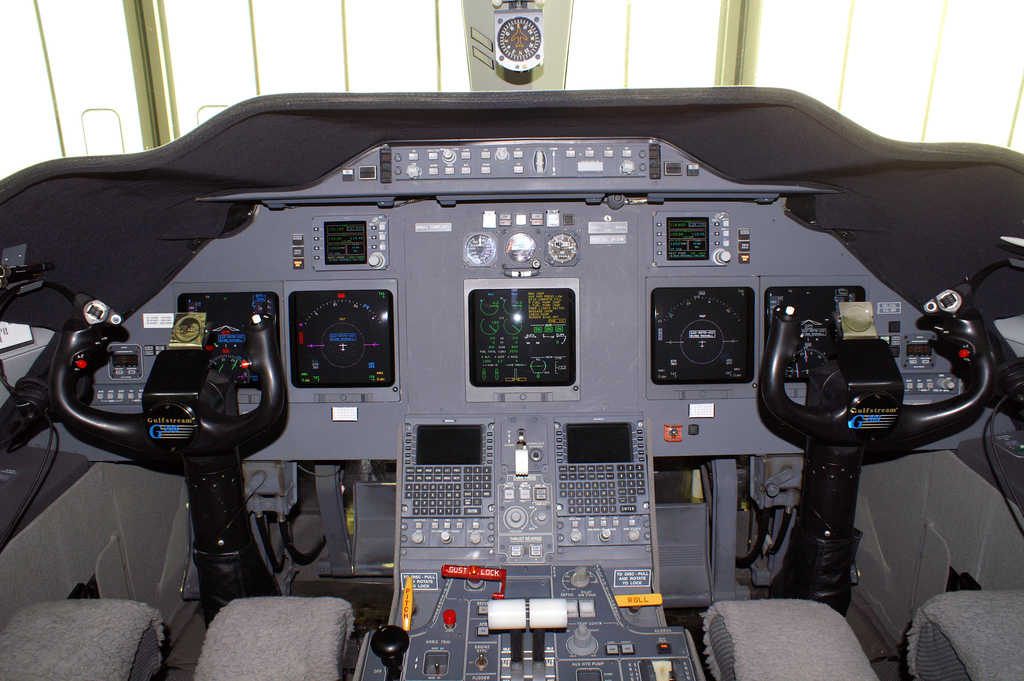
G200 cockpit

The Galaxy was based on a new wider fuselage, attached to a strengthened Astra SPX wing with integrated winglets and modified high-lift devices, powered by new 5,700-lb (25.3 kN) thrust Pratt & Whitney Canada PW306 turbofans, and with improved Pro Line 4 avionics and an all-new interior. The decision to use the existing Astra SPX wing imposed a maximum limit on size but allowed a fuselage large enough to accommodate three-abreast seating. The main change from the Astra SPX wing was the introduction of Krueger flaps on the leading edges of the inboard section. These recovered some of the field performance lost as a result of the Galaxy's higher wing loading. It used rubber de-ice boots on wing and horizontal stabilizer leading edges. The aircraft has seating configurations for 8 to 10 passengers. The G200 has a forward-tilting stance when on the ground.

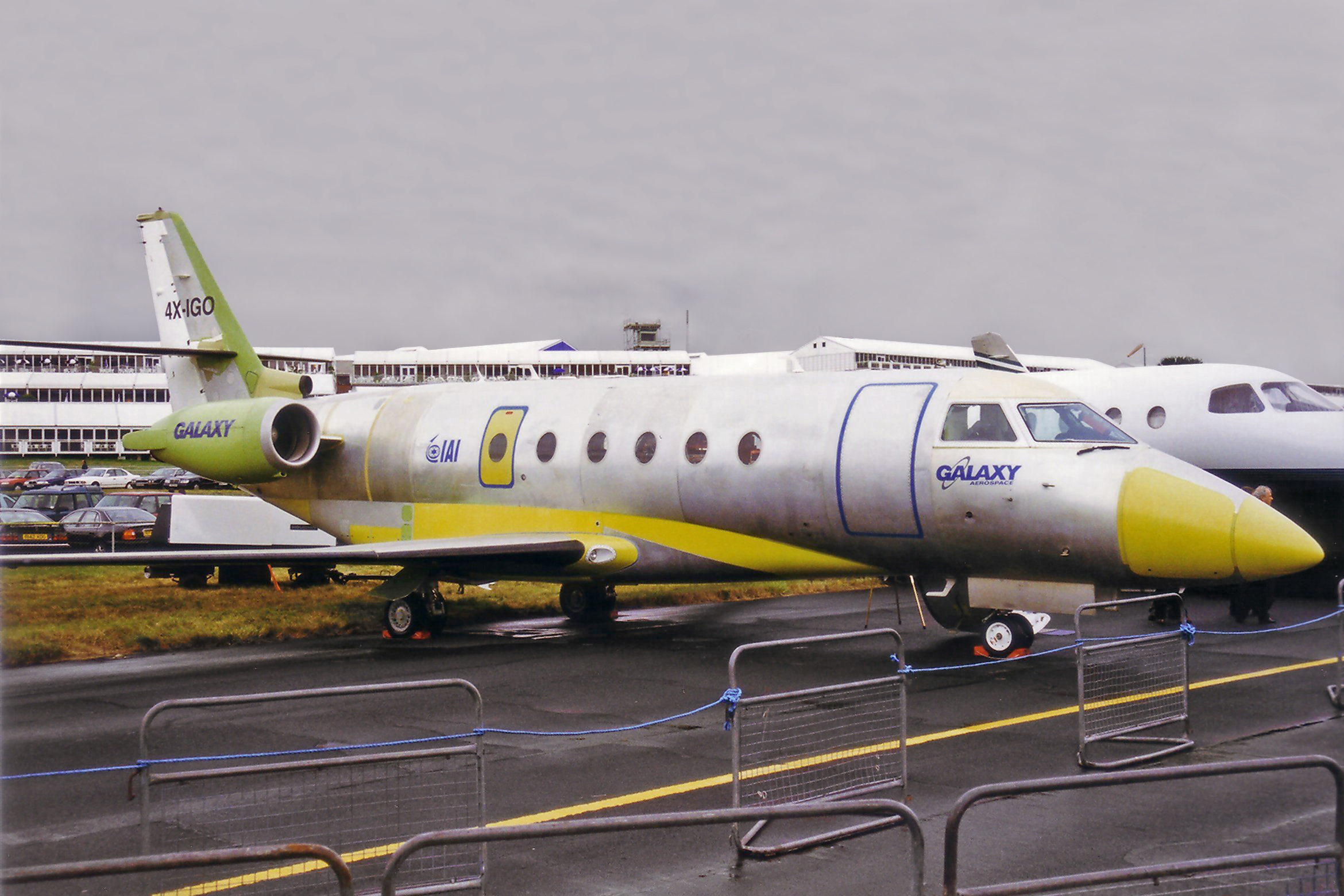
IAI Galaxy - September 1998

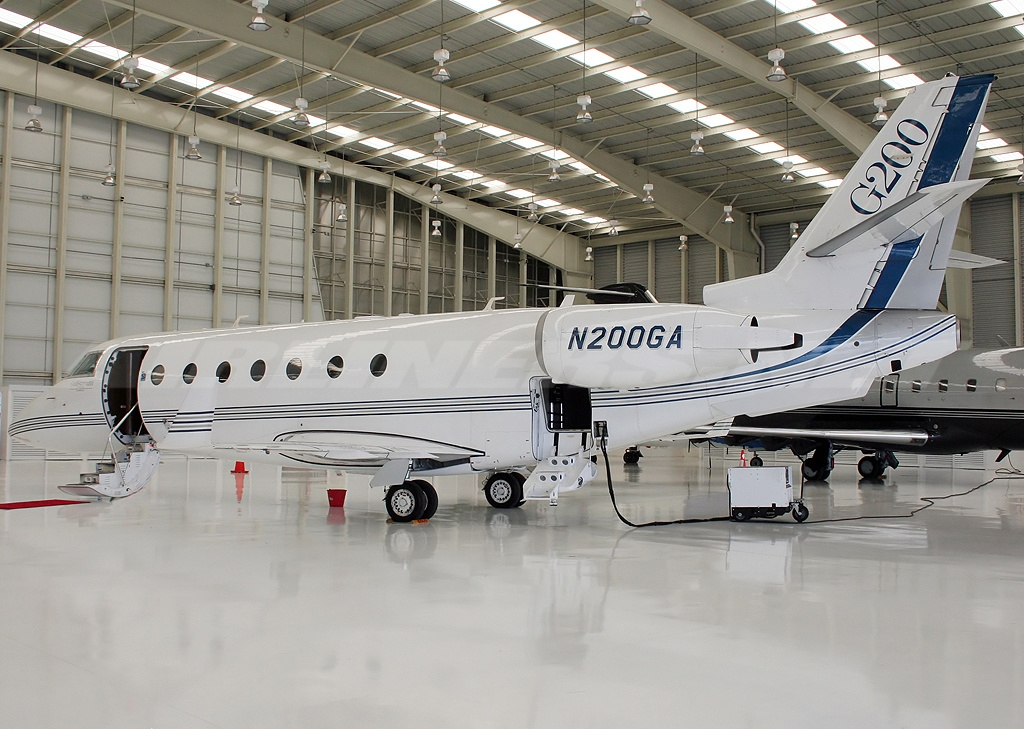
G200 in a hangar, access and luggage doors open

The Galaxy first flew on December 25, 1997. By December 1998 it had received certification from the US and Israeli aviation agencies. Deliveries began the following year. The Galaxy was renamed "G200" after Gulfstream Aerospace acquired Galaxy Aerospace in June 2001.

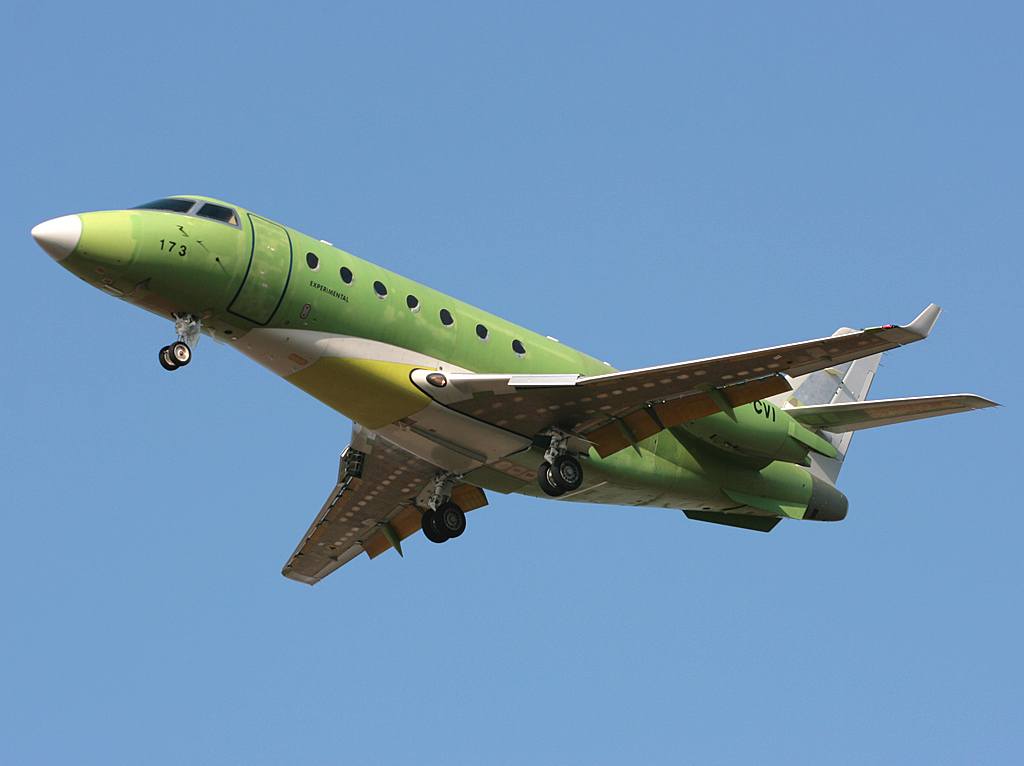
G200 inflight before painting, showing underside fairing, flaps and slats deployed

In 2005, Gulfstream began designing a follow-on aircraft. The new model, known as the "G250", was launched in 2008. It was later renamed the Gulfstream G280. The final production G200 rolled off the production line on December 19, 2011; 250 units had been built.

By 2018, 1999-2007 Gulfstream G200s were priced at $2.395 to $6.25 million.

== Accidents and incidents ==
- 7 June 2026: A G200 exploded while landing after its landing gear collapsed upon touchdown at La Romana International Airport. Both pilots died in the crash.

== Specifications ==
Data from Frawley Gulfstream G200 data

General characteristics

- Crew: 2
- Capacity: Typical Seating of 8-10, 18 Max / 4,050 lb (1,840 kg)
- Length: 62 ft 3 in (18.97 m)
- Wingspan: 58 ft 1 in (17.70 m)
- Height: 21 ft 5 in (6.53 m)
- Wing area: 369 sq ft (34.3 m^{2})
- Empty weight: 19,200 lb (8,709 kg)
- Max takeoff weight: 35,450 lb (16,080 kg)
- Powerplant: 2 × Pratt & Whitney Canada PW306A turbofans, 6,040 lbf (26.9 kN) thrust each

Performance

- Maximum speed: 487 kn (560 mph, 900 km/h) at altitude
- Cruise speed: 459 kn (528 mph, 850 km/h) normal cruise at altitude
- Range: 3,400 nmi (3,910 mi, 6,300 km) at Mach 0.75 with 4 passengers
- Service ceiling: 45,000 ft (13,700 m)

== See also ==
Related development

- Gulfstream G100
- Gulfstream G280
- Yakovlev Yak-48

Aircraft of comparable role, configuration, and era

- Cessna Citation Longitude
- Dassault Falcon 50
- Challenger 300
- Embraer Legacy 450/500 and Praetor 500/600
