= Cessna Citation Longitude =

Super-midsize American business jet first flown in 2016

Citation Longitude Model 700
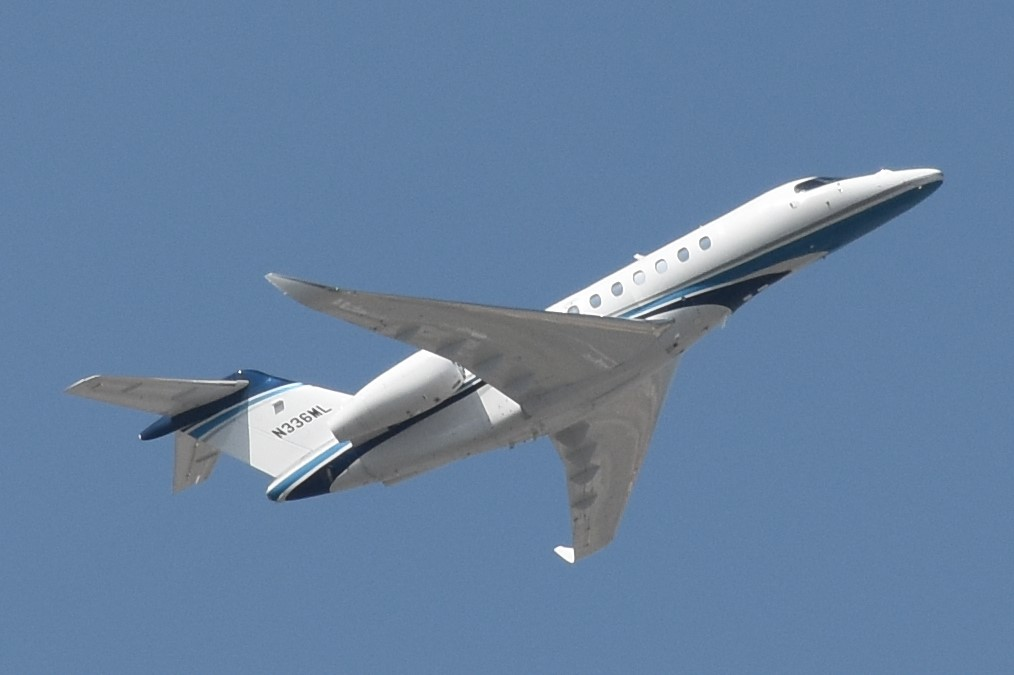

General information
- Type: Business jet
- National origin: United States
- Manufacturer: Cessna (subsidiary of Textron Aviation)
- Status: In production
- Number built: 100 (May 2023)

History
- Manufactured: September 2019 – present
- Introduction date: October 2019
- First flight: October 8, 2016
- Developed from: Cessna Citation Latitude
- Developed into: Cessna Citation Hemisphere

The Cessna Citation Longitude (Model 700) is a business jet produced by the American aerospace company Cessna, whose parent company is Textron Aviation; it is part of the Cessna Citation family. It remains the largest business jet by Cessna. Announced at the May 2012 EBACE, the Model 700 made its first flight on October 8, 2016, with certification obtained in September 2019. The aluminum airframe has the fuselage cross-section of the Citation Latitude, stretched by a seat row. Powered by Honeywell HTF7000 turbofans, it has a new ~28° swept wing and a T-tail for a 3,500 nmi (4,000 mi; 6,500 km) range.

== Design ==
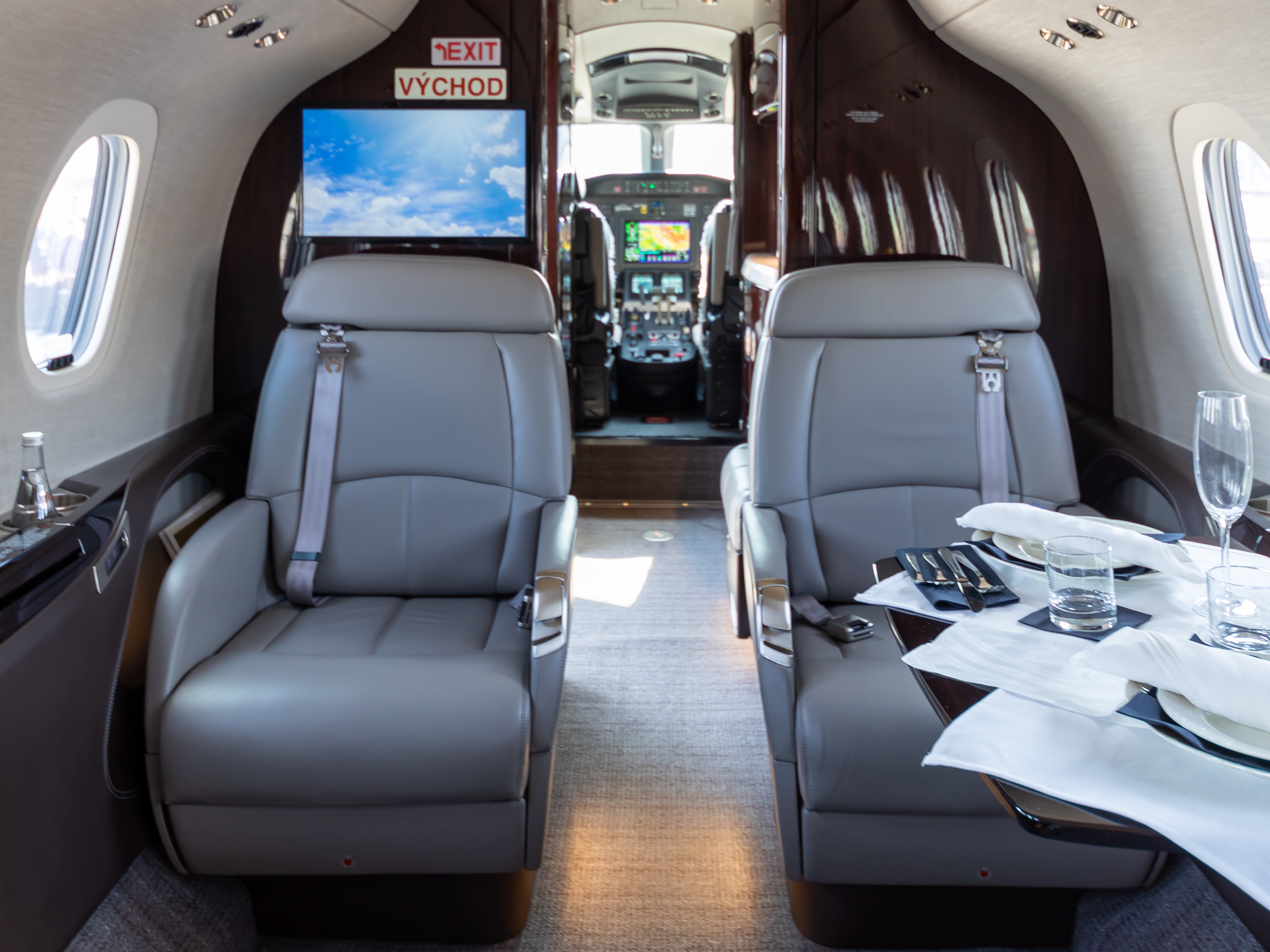
Flat-floor cabin

The project is perceived as the follow-on development to the now-canceled Cessna Citation Columbus. Its fuselage cross-section (83.25-inch [211.5 cm] circular section) is the same as the Cessna Citation Latitude. The aircraft has a T-tail empennage and area rule fuselage contouring. The aluminum wings incorporate moderate winglets. Construction is aluminum for both wing and fuselage. The cabin is 7 inches (18 cm) shorter and 6 inches (15 cm) narrower than the Columbus design.

Initially, the Snecma Silvercrest engine was selected to power the aircraft, however the production model is powered by Honeywell HTF7000 turbofans. The Silvercrest was planned for the larger Citation Hemisphere, but Textron suspended its development in July 2019 as the turbofan did not meet objectives.

Its wings and empennage are similar to the Hawker 4000 with winglets leading to a 5.3 feet (1.6 m) larger wingspan. The moderately super-critical wing have a quarter-chord sweep of 26.8° for its inner section and 28.6° for the outer section. The six-passenger Latitude fuselage has been reinforced and stretched by another row of seats to accommodate eight people in double club. The manufacturer has not announced the final design weights (as of May 2016); BCA estimates a 24,000–25,000-pound (10,900–11,300 kg) basic operating weight. Cabin height is 6.0 ft (1.8 m), width is 6 ft 5 in (1.96 m), floor width is 4 ft 1 in (1.24 m) and cabin length is 25 ft (7.6 m).

After a takeoff at 31,150 lb (14,130 kg), 8,350 lb (3,790 kg) below the 39,500 lb (17,900 kg) MTOW, the climb rate is 2,550 ft/min (13.0 m/s) at FL200. At its Mach 0.83, 473 kn (544 mph; 876 km/h) TAS max cruise, fuel flow per side is 860–880 lb (390–400 kg) per hour at FL430 and ISA -4. A M0.79 long range cruise would burn 1,820 lb (830 kg) per hour at a 451 kn (519 mph; 835 km/h) true airspeed for a 38,001 lb (17,237 kg) aircraft, and 2,122 lb (963 kg) per hour at its M0.84 MMO - 477 kn (549 mph; 883 km/h) TAS.

== Development ==
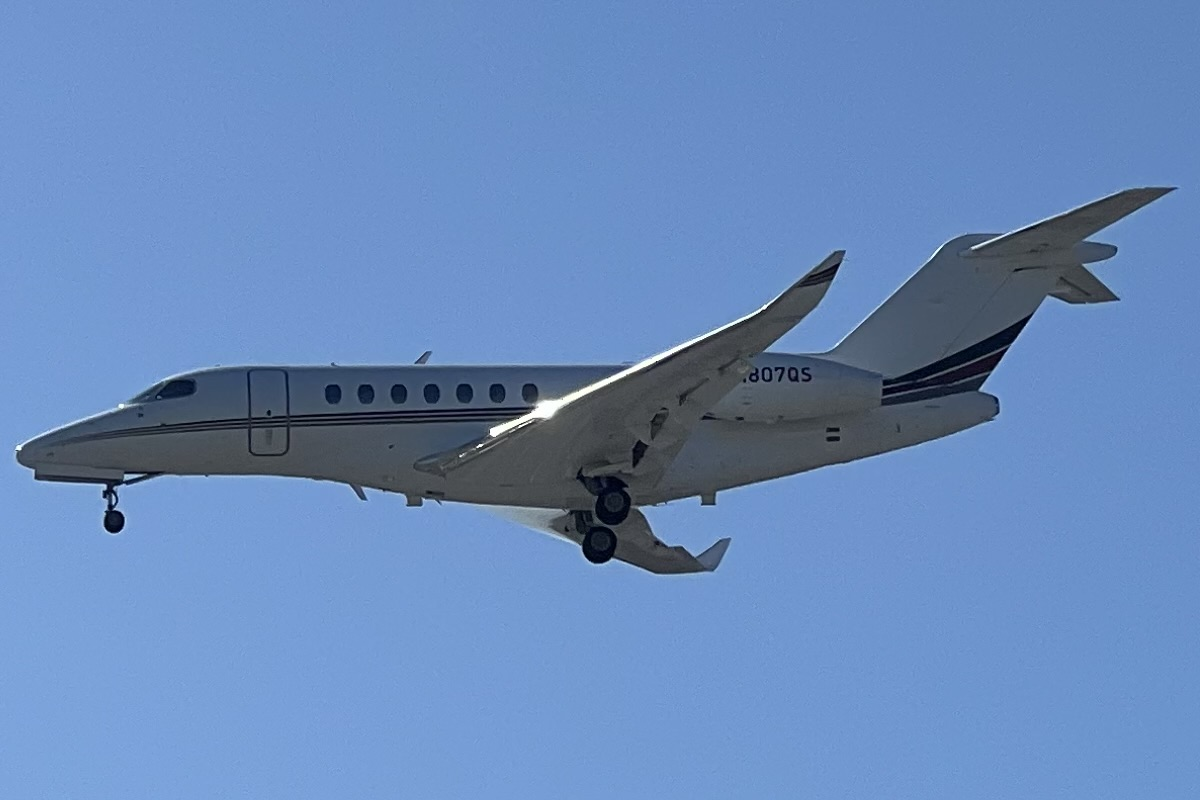
Inflight, gear down

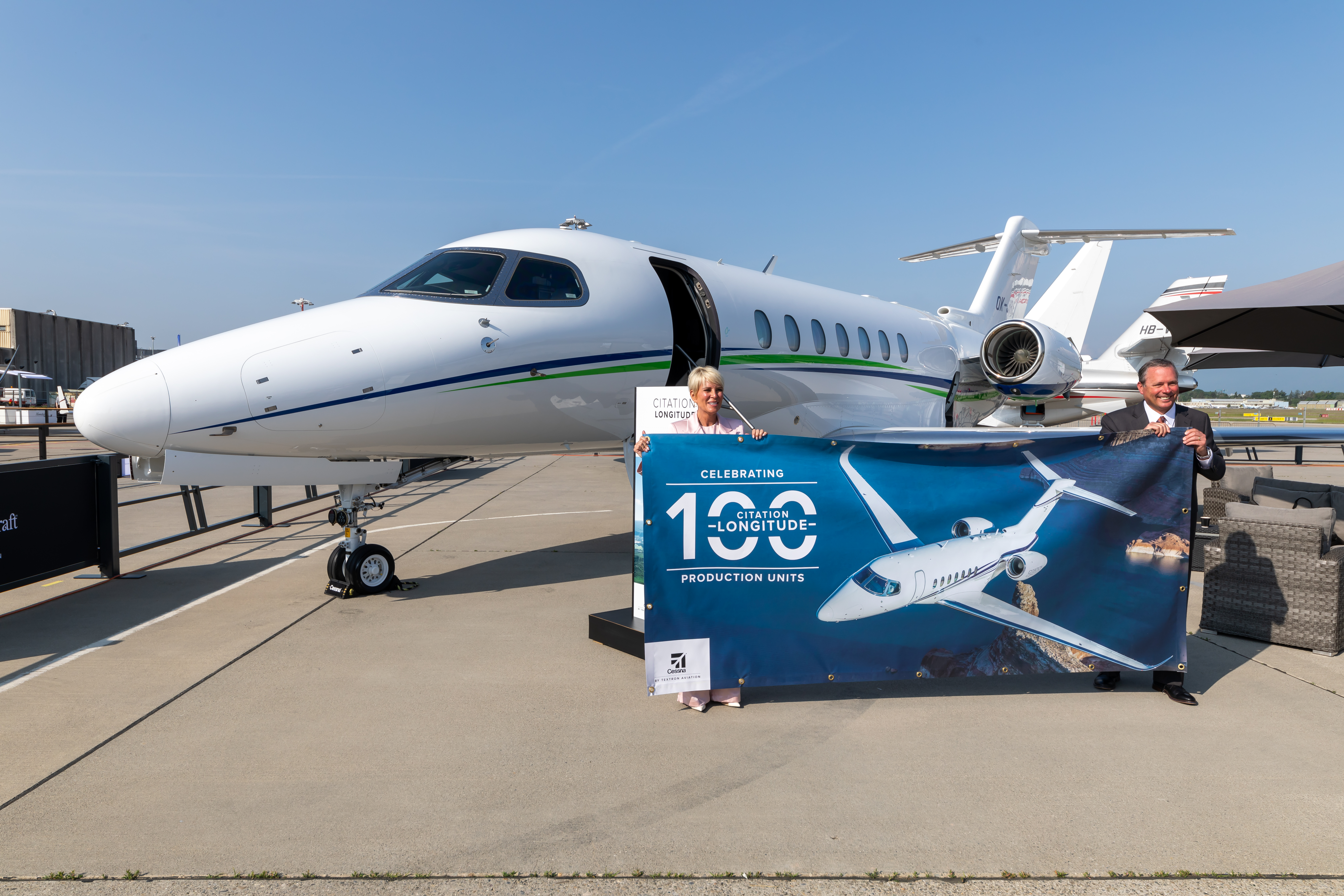
Announcement of the 100th delivery at EBACE 2023

Announced at the May 2012 EBACE and scheduled for introduction in 2017. The first flight-test aircraft completed its first flight on October 8, 2016. The second flew in November, and in March 2017 the third, used to develop avionics and systems and to collect flight simulator data before two others will join the test program. The two aircraft completed 125 flights for more than 250 hours as production of the aircraft commenced at Textron Aviation's Wichita, Kansas facility.

Less than eight months after the first flight and after more than 200 missions for nearly 400 hours, on track for certification later in 2017, the fourth prototype joined the flight-test program on May 6, fully outfitted for interior, environmental control system, pressurization and cabin technologies evaluation. The first production unit was rolled out on June 13, 2017, as the four test aircraft have flown 550 hours and a fifth aircraft will join in summer 2017. In October 2017, test aircraft have completed more than 1,200 flight hours over 600 flights, for a certification expected by the end of 2017 or in early 2018.

In February 2018, as the five aircraft accumulated over 1,000 flights and 2,000 hours, US approval and customer deliveries of the US$27 million jet were expected before the end of the second quarter before European validation six months later. After 3,000 hours on five aircraft, flight testing will conclude by early June 2018, and 200,000 pages of documentation will be completed after a month. As testing has doubled for certification, expanding related documentation, it is expected in the third quarter of 2018 with deliveries from late in this quarter or early in the fourth, less than a year after originally planned. It received a partial exemption for fuel tank flammability requirements applicable through January 2020 to keep its third-quarter approval goal, but a compliance plan had to be submitted by October 1, 2018.

On October 15, 2018, fractional operator NetJets announced the purchase of up to 175 Longitudes, sold for $26 million each, along 150 Citation Hemispheres, priced at $35 million. After 4,050 hours in 1,650 test flights, the Longitude received a provisional FAA type certification on December 20, allowing deliveries in early 2019. The fuel tank flammability requirements were addressed on December 5, with airplanes to be delivered having the definitive installation but limiting it for high elevation airport or RVSM operations, and restricting maintenance. The provisional type certification allowed to begin customer training flights and Textron expects certification in February 2019, while deliveries to NetJets should begin in the third quarter.

On September 21, 2019, the FAA granted its Type Certification. It came after 6,000 flight hours, 11,000 test points and a 31,000 nmi (36,000 mi; 57,000 km) world tour. The first was shipped in early October. On December 31, 2019, NetJets took delivery of its first Longitude from its order for 150, expecting to enter service early in the first quarter of 2020.

Textron Aviation announced EASA certification of the Citation Longitude on July 13, 2021. In 2023, its equipped price was $29.995M. The 100th Longitude was delivered in May 2023.

== Operators ==
Japan

- Japan Civil Aviation Bureau – Received one Citation Longitude equipped for calibration of ground-based navigation and landing systems in June 2022.

Turkey

- General Directorate of State Airports Authority – One Citation Longitude equipped for calibration duties on order.

United States

- Central Intelligence Agency – In 2026, The Washington Post identified a Citation Longitude operating under the callsign FENIX 701 as being related to a series of attacks on fishing boats operating near the Galápagos Islands. The Post's reporting traced the ownership of the plane back to the CIA.

== Specifications ==
Data from "Citation Longitude Specifications". Textron Aviation.

General characteristics

- Crew: 2+1 optional crew member
- Capacity: 8–12
- Length: 73 ft 2 in (22.30 m)
- Wingspan: 68 ft 11 in (21.01 m)
- Height: 19 ft 5 in (5.92 m)
- Wing area: 537 sq ft (49.9 m^{2})
- Empty weight: 23,389 lb (10,609 kg)
- Max takeoff weight: 39,500 lb (17,917 kg)
- Fuel capacity: 14,511 lb (6,600 kg)
- Full Fuel Payload : 1,600 lb (730 kg)
- Cabin Height: 72 in (1.83 m)
- Cabin Width: 77 in (1.96 m)
- Cabin Length: 25 ft 2 in (7.67 m)
- Powerplant: 2 × Honeywell HTF7700L turbofans, 7,665 lbf (34.10 kN) thrust each

Performance

- Cruise speed: 483 kn (556 mph, 895 km/h) 0.84M maximum limit speed
- Range: 3,500 nmi (4,028 mi, 6,482 km)
- Service ceiling: 45,000 ft (13,716 m)
- Time to altitude: 16 minutes to 43,000 feet for 33,000 lb (14,970 kg) at takeoff
- Minimum takeoff runway length: 4,810 ft (1,470 m)
- Minimum landing runway length: 3,170 ft (970 m)
- Cabin altitude: 5,950 ft (1,810 m)
- Fuel consumption: 2,400 lb (1,100 kg) for the first hour, 1,600–1,800 lb (730–820 kg) per hour in cruise.

Avionics

- Garmin G5000 flight deck

== See also ==
Related development

- Cessna Citation series
- Cessna Citation Columbus
- Cessna Citation Latitude
- Cessna Citation Hemisphere

Aircraft of comparable role, configuration, and era

- Gulfstream G280
- Bombardier Challenger 350
- Embraer Legacy 450/500 and Praetor 500/600
- Embraer Legacy 600
- Dassault Falcon 2000S
