= Cessna Citation Excel =

Medium-sized business jet

Citation Excel / XLS / XLS+ / Ascend
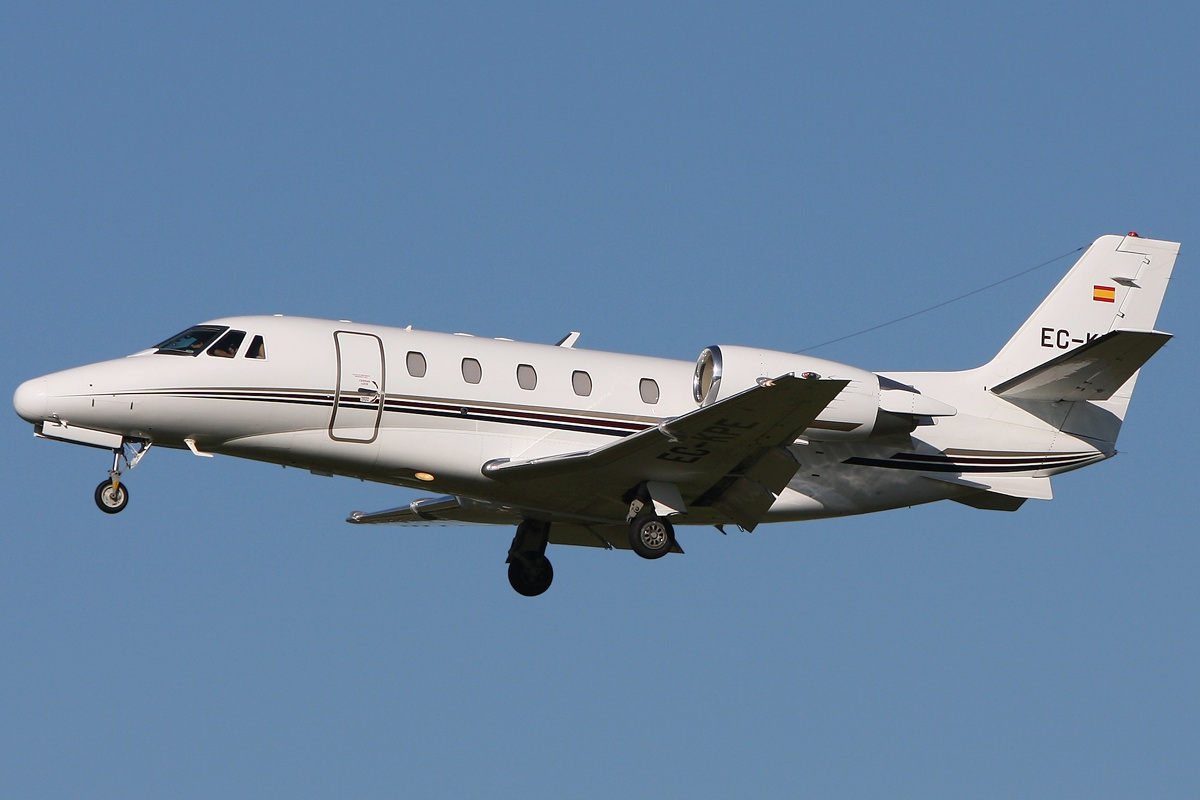
- Cessna 560XL Citation Excel in landing configuration

General information
- Type: Business jet
- Manufacturer: Cessna; Textron Aviation
- Status: Active In production
- Number built: 1000

History
- Manufactured: 1996–present
- First flight: 29 February 1996
- Developed from: Cessna Citation V/Cessna Citation X
- Developed into: Cessna Citation Sovereign

The Cessna Citation Excel is an American midsize business jet in the Cessna Citation family. Announced in October 1994, the Model 560XL first flew on February 29, 1996, certification was granted in April 1998, and over 1,000 have been delivered. The 2,100 nmi-range (2,400 mi; 3,900 km), 20,200 lb (9,200 kg) MTOW jet is powered by two 3,650–4,080 lbf (16.2–18.1 kN) PW545 turbofans, has the cruciform tail and unswept supercritical wing of the Citation V (560), and a slightly shortened Citation X stand-up cabin. The XLS 2004 update had upgraded engines and a glass cockpit and the 2008 XLS+ had upgraded engines and a revised nose. The Citation Ascend, which entered service in 2025, has interior, communications and avionics updates, a flat cabin floor, and enlarged windows.

== Development ==
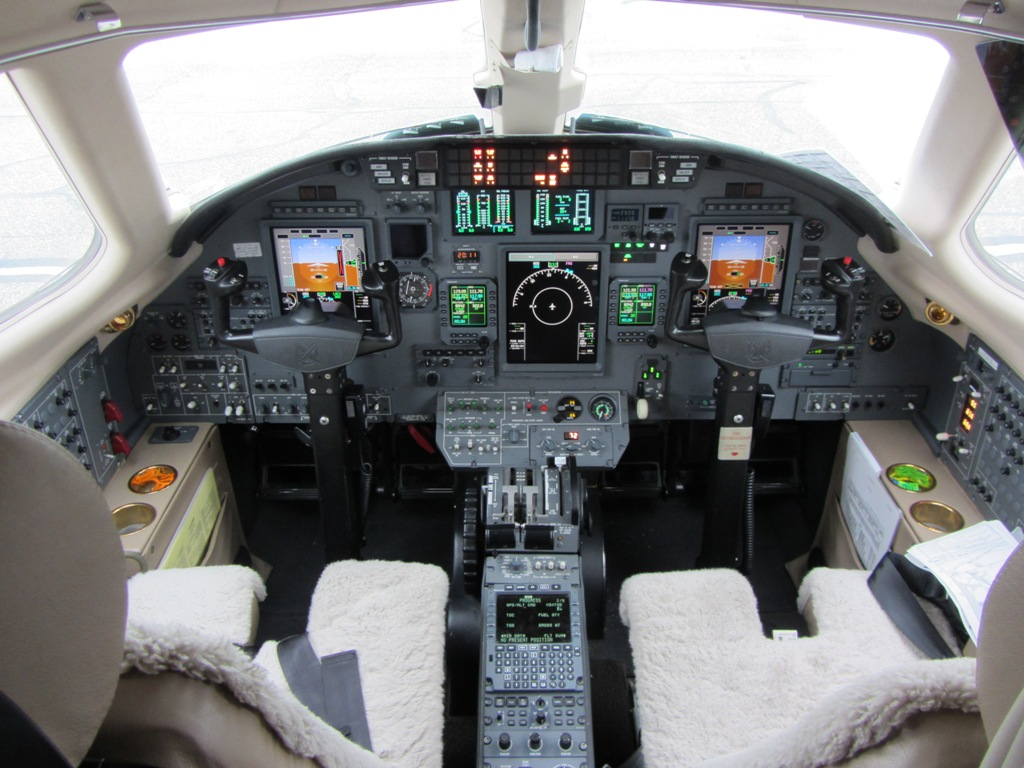
Cessna 560XL cockpit

With the success of Cessna's high-end Citation VII, the manufacturer saw a market for an aircraft with the Citation X's features but aimed at a more traditional market, where it would chiefly compete with twin-turboprop aircraft.

The project was announced at the annual NBAA convention in October, 1994, and the prototype aircraft took off on its first flight on February 29, 1996. Federal Aviation Administration certification was granted in April 1998, by which time Cessna had over 200 orders for the aircraft. Its unit cost in 1999 was US$8.7M. By the time the 100th Excel was delivered in August 2000, an aircraft was coming off the Wichita production line every three days. A total of 308 were built before production switched to the Citation XLS.

The Citation XLS was the first "makeover" that the Excel received, with deliveries beginning in 2004. Besides a glass cockpit based on the Honeywell Primus 1000 EFIS avionics suite, the XLS featured the upgraded PW545B engines with increased performance. It was produced in 330 units. By 2018, ten year old XLS models were trading near $4 million.

The Citation XLS+, or simply "Plus" configuration was another upgraded version of the aircraft which began delivery in 2008, with the inclusion of FADEC engine controls, improved PW545C engines, and a completely revised nose design similar to that found on the Citation Sovereign and Citation X. The Citation XLS+ features Collins Pro Line 21 Avionics and a four screen LCD EFIS display as opposed to the three tube (CRT) Honeywell display in the XL and the three screen LCD Primus 1000 in the XLS. In 2023, its equipped price was $16.11M.

The Citation Ascend was announced at the EBACE industry conference in May 2023. It features new avionics, engine improvements, and an upgraded interior featuring a flat cabin floor, enlarged windows and swiveling passenger seats. The Ascend entered service in December 2025.

== Design ==
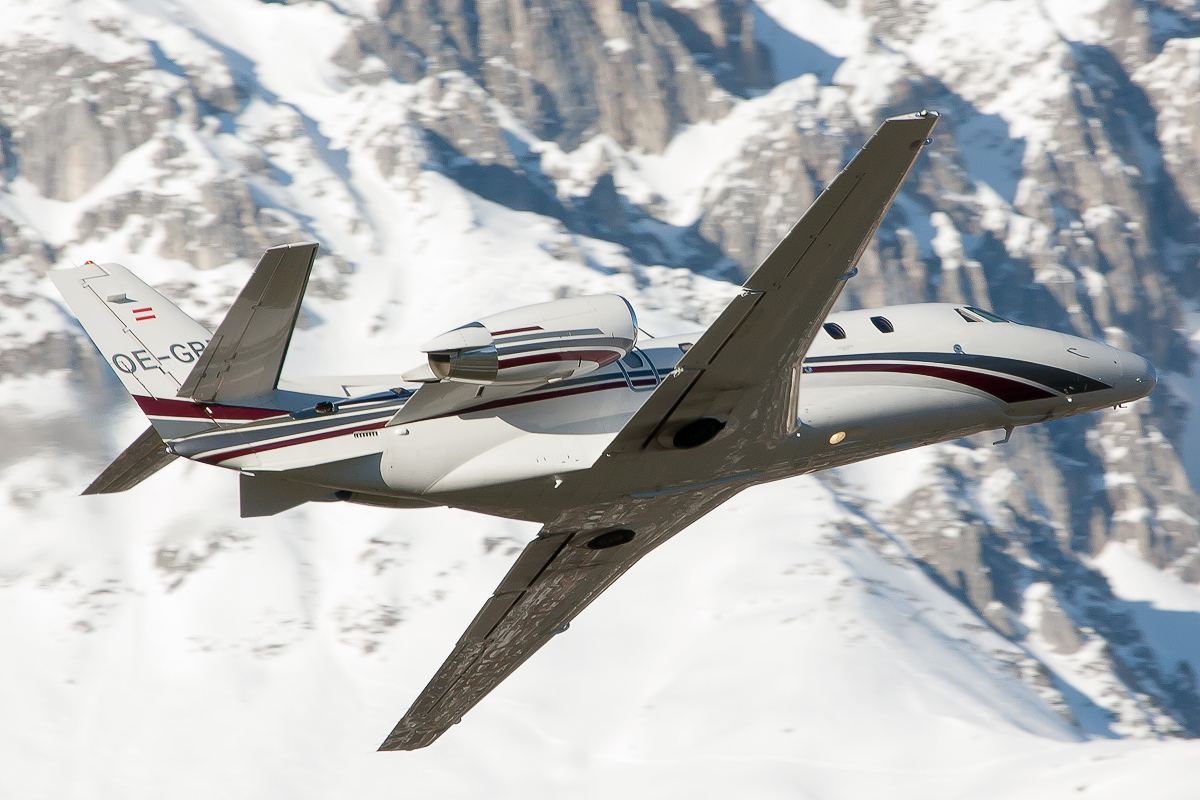
Cessna Model 560XL Citation XLS taking off from Innsbruck Airport (February 2014)

To produce the Excel, Cessna took the X's cabin fuselage (itself inherited from the Citation III), shortened it by about 2 feet (0.61 m), and mated it with an unswept wing utilising a supercritical airfoil based on the Citation S/II's wing and the tail from the Citation V.

The Excel has the roomiest cabin in its class of light corporate jets and can seat up to 10 passengers (in high-density configuration; typically the number is six to eight in a corporate configuration), while being flown by a crew of two.

To power the aircraft, Cessna chose the Pratt & Whitney Canada PW500 turbofan.

The original version had two cockpit configurations involving where the landing gear was on the panel. With the gear on the left hand side, the MFD was moved to the right slightly and both radios were moved to the right of the MFD next to each other. With the gear handle on the right side, the MFD remained centered with the radios on either side. The Excel uses Honeywell avionics and an optional Auxiliary power unit also powered by Honeywell.

== Operators ==
The aircraft is operated by private individuals, companies, fractionals, charter operators and aircraft management companies. The Swiss Air Force is an operator. NetJets is also a major operator in the United States offering fractional ownership and charter flights.

The 560's ICAO aircraft type designator is C56X.

== Accidents and incidents ==
As of September 2021, the Citation Excel had been involved in eleven aviation accidents and incidents including six hull losses, with eleven fatalities stemming from two of the crashes. On 13 August 2014, a Citation 560XLS+ transporting Brazilian presidential candidate Eduardo Campos and his entourage in the lead up to elections in October crashed in the city of Santos, São Paulo, killing all seven on board. This was the first fatal crash of a Citation Excel since entering service in 1996.

== Specifications (Citation XLS+) ==
Data from Cessna Citation XLS+ web site

General characteristics

- Crew: 2
- Capacity: 9 passengers / 7,400 lb (3,357 kg) useful load
- Length: 52 ft 6 in (16.0 m)
- Wingspan: 56 ft 4 in (17.17 m)
- Height: 17 ft 2 in (5.23 m)
- Empty weight: 12,800 lb (5,806 kg)
- Max takeoff weight: 20,200 lb (9,163 kg)
- Powerplant: 2 × Pratt & Whitney Canada PW545C turbofans, 4,119 lbf (18.32 kN) thrust each

Performance

- Cruise speed: 441 kn (507 mph, 816 km/h) true airspeed
- Range: 1,858 nmi (2,138 mi, 3,441 km)
- Service ceiling: 45,000 ft (13,716 m)
- Rate of climb: 3,500 ft/min (17.78 m/s)

== See also ==
Related development

- Cessna Citation series
- Cessna Citation X
- Cessna Citation Sovereign

Aircraft of comparable role, configuration, and era

- Hawker 800XP
- Bombardier Challenger
- Dassault Falcon
- Embraer Phenom 300
