= Cessna Citation II =

American business jet

Cessna Citation II / IISP / SII Citation Bravo
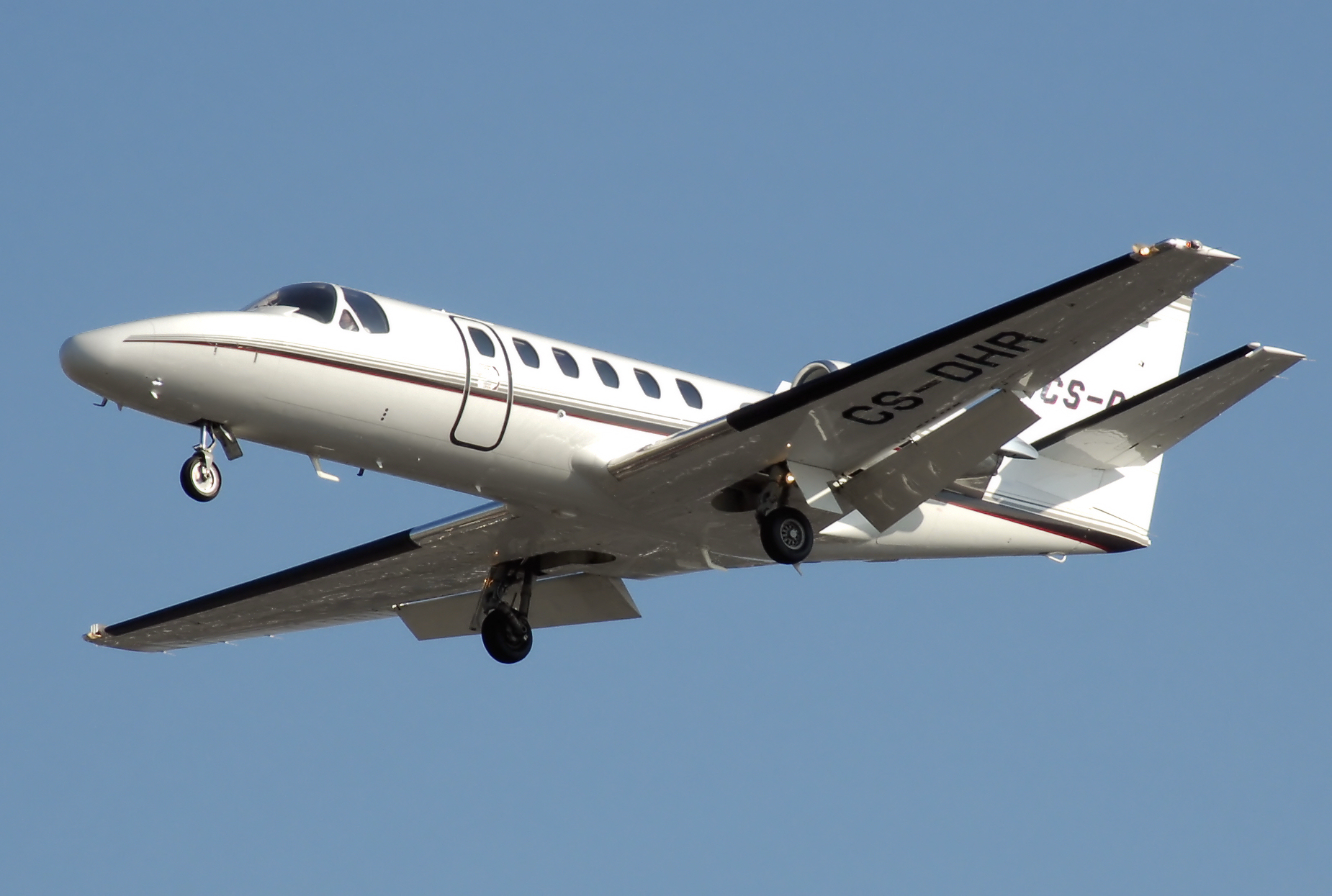

General information
- Type: Corporate jet
- National origin: United States
- Manufacturer: Cessna
- Number built: 1184: 688 II and II/SP, 160 S/II, 336 Bravo

History
- Manufactured: 1978–2006
- First flight: January 31, 1977
- Developed from: Cessna Citation I
- Developed into: Cessna Citation V

The Cessna Citation II models are light corporate jets built by Cessna as part of the Citation family. Stretched from the Citation I, the Model 550 was announced in September 1976, first flew on January 31, 1977, and was certified in March 1978. The II/SP is a single pilot version, the improved S/II first flew on February 14, 1984 and the Citation Bravo, a stretched S/II with new avionics and more powerful P&WC PW530A turbofans, first flew on April 25, 1995. The United States Navy adopted a version of the S/II as the T-47A. Production ceased in 2006 after 1,184 of all variants were delivered.

== Design and development ==
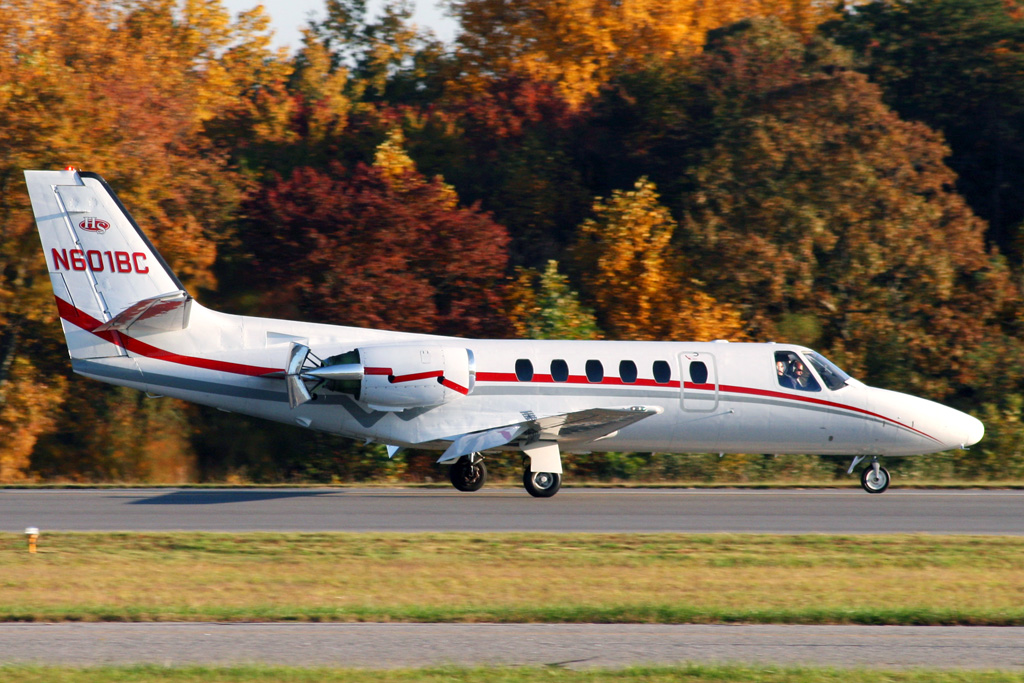
A Citation II seen shortly after landing

The Citation II (Model 550) was developed to provide the same docile low-speed handling and good short-field performance as the preceding Citation I while addressing a primary criticism of that aircraft — its relatively slow cruise speed of around 350 kn (400 mph; 650 km/h) at altitude. The II stretches the Citation I fuselage by 1.14m (3 ft 9in), increasing seating capacity to ten (two pilots and eight passengers) and gross weight to 13,300 lb (6,000 kg). Wingspan was increased by 5.1 ft (1.6 m), fuel capacity was increased from 544 US gal (2,060 L) to 742 US gal (2,810 L), and more powerful, 2,500 lbf (11 kN) Pratt & Whitney Canada JT15D-4 engines were installed for a higher cruise speed of 385 kn (443 mph; 713 km/h) and a longer range of 1,159 nmi (1,334 mi; 2,146 km). The cabin interior was also redesigned to increase headroom by 5 in (13 cm).

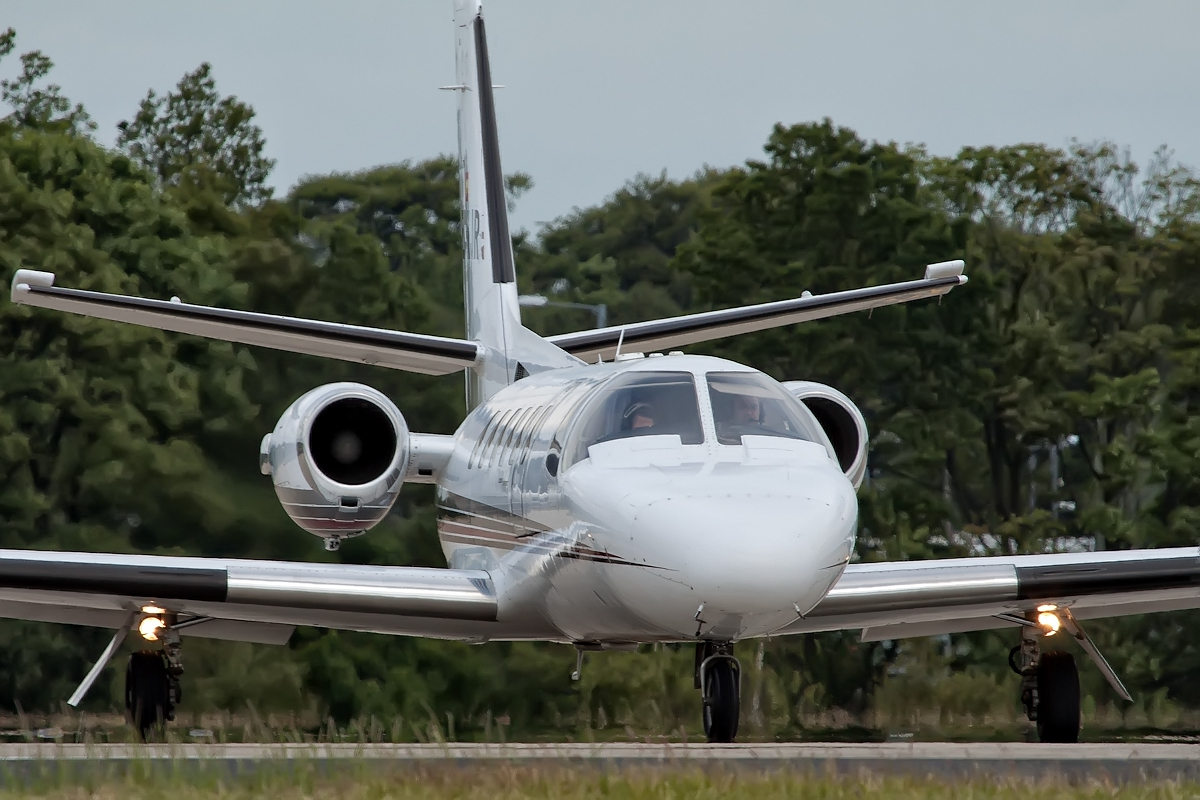
Citation II/SP (model 551) front view

The stretched Citation was announced in September 1976, it first flew on January 31, 1977, and FAA certification was awarded in March 1978. The II/SP (Model 551) is the single pilot version, type certificated to slightly less stringent FAR Part 23 standards, with a slightly reduced maximum takeoff weight (MTOW) at 12,500 lb (5,700 kg) and minor changes in cockpit equipment. As the II and II/SP are otherwise largely similar, the 800 lb (360 kg) reduction in MTOW of the II/SP often mandates operating with a reduced fuel load, shortening the aircraft's loaded range compared to the standard II. Both the II and II/SP require special training to be operated by a single pilot. A total of 688 II and II/SP aircraft were delivered.

=== Citation S/II ===
The improved Citation S/II (Model S550) was announced in October 1983 and first flew on February 14, 1984, before certification in July. It gained a supercritical airfoil with swept wing roots, aileron and flap gap seals, and a fluid deicing system instead of the pneumatic deicing boots used on earlier Citations. To further reduce drag, the fuselage and engine nacelle pylons were redesigned, and nacelle fairings were added. Fuel capacity was increased by 120 US gal (450 L). The result of the improvements was a cruise speed of 403 kn (464 mph; 746 km/h)—exceeding 400 kn (460 mph), felt to be an important marketing benchmark by Cessna—and a range of 1,378 nmi (1,586 mi; 2,552 km) with a 45-minute fuel reserve. The improved 2,500 lbf (11 kN) JT15D-4B engines had higher temperature-rated components, allowing more thrust at higher altitudes.

The S/II replaced the II from 1984, but some potential buyers objected to the sharp price increase from US$2.6 million for the II to $3.3M for the S/II, prompting Cessna to reintroduce the II in late 1985; both were built until the Bravo was introduced. Deliveries of the S/II amounted to 160, including fifteen T-47A aircraft purchased by the U.S. Navy. The S/II's higher performance coupled with its relatively low production total led to substantially higher demand on the used aircraft market compared to the standard II and II/SP.

==== Government variants ====
The US Customs & Border Protection purchased ten Citation IIs configured with fire control radar (initially the F-16's AN/APG-66(V), later the Selex ES Vixen 500E system) and the WF-360TL imaging system. These aircraft have been used effectively in Panama, Honduras, Colombia, Peru, Venezuela, Mexico and Aruba. The similar OT-47B aircraft are based on the Cessna Citation V airframe.

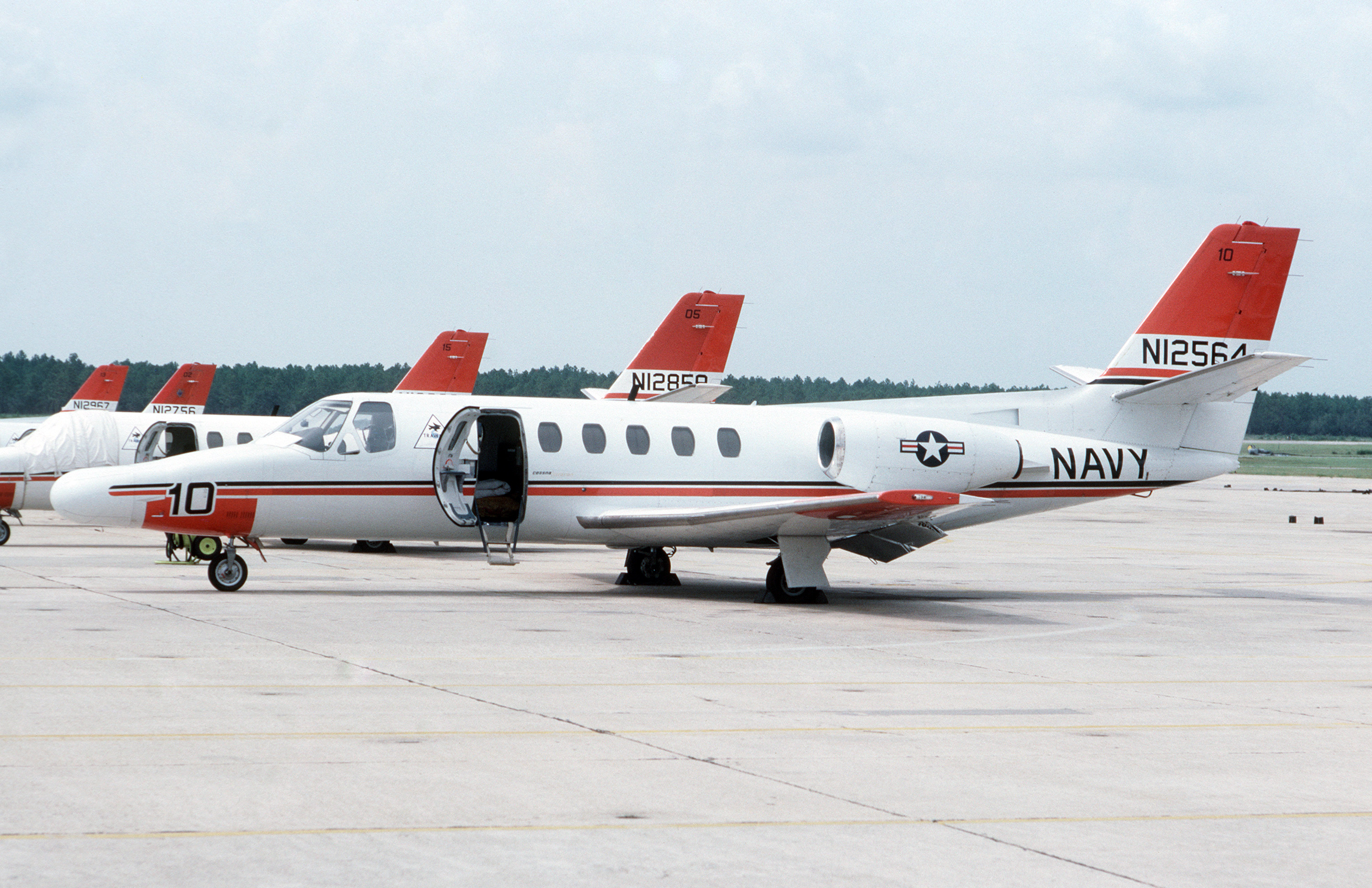
Several U.S. Navy T-47A radar systems trainers seen in 1989

The T-47A was a modified version of the Citation S/II (Model 552) for the U.S. Navy, featuring a 5 ft (1.5 m) wingspan reduction and hydraulically boosted ailerons for improved maneuverability, 2,900 lbf (13 kN) thrust JT15D-5 engines, a cockpit roof window for better pilot visibility during hard maneuvering, strengthened windshields for protection against bird strikes during high-speed low-altitude sorties, multiple radar consoles, and the AN/APQ-167 radar system. Intended to replace the North American T-39D as a radar systems trainer aircraft, fifteen aircraft were purchased in 1984 to train naval radar intercept officers.

All T-47A aircraft were operated with civil aircraft registration numbers by Training Air Squadron VT-86 based at Naval Air Station Pensacola, Florida. On July 20, 1993, ten of the fifteen aircraft were destroyed when a roofing contractor accidentally set fire to a hangar at Forbes Field where the aircraft were being stored by Cessna. The five survivors were subsequently transferred to Cessna and other civil owners.

=== Citation Bravo ===
The Citation Bravo first flew on April 25, 1995, was granted certification in August 1996, and was first delivered in February 1997. It features new P&WC PW530A turbofans, modern Honeywell Primus EFIS avionics, a revised Citation Ultra interior and a trailing link main undercarriage. Production of the Bravo ceased in late 2006 after 336 had been delivered.

Its more efficient PW530A generates 15% more thrust at takeoff and 23% more at altitude. It burns 1,100 lb (500 kg) of fuel in the first hour, dropping to 750–830 lb (340–380 kg) the second hour cruising at 360–365 kn (414–420 mph; 667–676 km/h) at FL410-430 and then 637 lb (289 kg) the third hour at 350 kn (400 mph; 650 km/h) and FL450. The engine overhaul every 4,000 hours cost $1 million or $275 at power by the Hour. In 2018, early 1997 models starts at $800,000, up to $1.7 million for 2006 planes. The Bravo was replaced by the better-but-more-expensive Citation CJ3. The competing Beechjet 400A is roomier and faster but needs more fuel and more runway, while the compact Learjet 31A is faster but has less range. The faster and more expensive Citation V Ultra has a longer cabin but consumes more fuel.

=== Upgrades ===
By December 2006, Clifford Development in Ohio had launched a program to re-engine Citation IIs with 3,000 lbf (13 kN) Williams FJ44-3 engines for $1.9 million (~$2.91 million in 2025). Clifford expected a STC within 12 months, 21% faster long-range cruise, 29% longer range, 34% better single-engine climb rate and 20% better fuel efficiency. By May 2007, Sierra Industries in Texas was also developing a similar modification, as 900 Citations qualify for it, directly as a broker and MRO provider, while Clifford should license its STC.

In September 2008, the FAA granted a STC to Sierra Industries. The Super S-II made its first flight on September 26. The conversion cost $1.9 million in 2009, resulting in a $3.5-4.6 million value for a converted Citation II. Ceiling is increased from FL 410 to FL 430, reached directly in 25 min at max takeoff weight with a thrust increased from 2,500 to 2,820 lbf (11.1 to 12.5 kN) each. Dual-channel FADEC allows a much lower residual thrust, eliminating the need for thrust reversers. Max fuel payload is bumped from 328 to 1,278 lb (149 to 580 kg) for the Citation II, and the S-II can carry 400 lb (180 kg) more than the initial 1,036 lb (470 kg).

Cruise speeds are faster by 45 to 400 kn (52 to 460 mph; 83 to 741 km/h) for the 550, and by 35 to 420 kn (40 to 483 mph; 65 to 778 km/h) for the Citation S-II. The converted 550 is 25% more fuel efficient than the JT15D-powered original at the same speed, and burns 775 lb (352 kg) of fuel per hour at 390 kn (450 mph; 720 km/h). The 550 Range is improved by 397 to 1,775 nmi (457 to 2,043 mi; 735 to 3,287 km), and by 461 to 2,300 nmi (531 to 2,647 mi; 854 to 4,260 km) for the S550. The re-engined S550 can reach 446 kn (513 mph; 826 km/h) at FL270. Clifford and its partner Stevens Aviation could also update the flight deck with Collins ProLine 21 avionics and refurbish the cabin. Clifford was touting a 14% faster optimum cruise speed, and a 32% lower fuel burn for the S550. Sierra was announcing a 1,890 and 2,064 nmi (2,175 and 2,375 mi; 3,500 and 3,823 km) IFR/VFR range for the re-engined Super II; or a 2,340 and 2,610 nmi (2,690 and 3,000 mi; 4,330 and 4,830 km) IFR/VFR range for the re-engined Super S-II. By June 2012, Sierra Industries had re-engined 59 various Citations with FJ44s, among avionics retrofit and airframe modifications.

== Variants ==
- Citation II (Model 550), stretched development of the Model 500 with increased wingspan, fuel capacity and gross weight, first produced in 1978. Initially replaced by the S/II in production, but was brought back and produced side by side with the S/II until the Bravo was introduced.
- Citation II/SP (Model 551), single-pilot version of Model 550 with reduced gross weight.
- Citation S/II (Model S550), development of Model 550 introduced in 1984 featuring a supercritical wing with swept wing roots, increased fuel capacity, and various minor improvements. Initially replaced the II in production.
- T-47A (Model 552), U.S. Navy radar systems trainer version of S/II with a shortened wingspan, strengthened windshields, cockpit roof windows, more powerful JT15D-5 engines, and military equipment.
- Citation Bravo (Model 550 Bravo), updated S/II with new PW530A engines, landing gear and Primus 1000 avionics. The last Citation Bravo rolled off the production line in late 2006, ending a nearly 10-year production run of 337 aircraft.

== Operators ==
=== Military operators ===
Argentina

- Argentine Army Aviation

Colombia

- Colombian Air Force

Dominican Republic

- Dominican Republic Air Force

Ecuador

- Ecuadorian Army Aviation

Myanmar

- Myanmar Air Force

Nigeria

- Nigerian Air Force

Pakistan

- Pakistan Army

Saudi Arabia

- Royal Saudi Air Force

South Africa

- South African Air Force

Spain

- Spanish Air Force
- Spanish Navy
- National Police Corps of Spain

Sweden

- Swedish Air Force

Turkey

- Turkish Air Force

United States

- United States Navy

Venezuela

- Venezuelan Air Force

=== Civilian operators ===
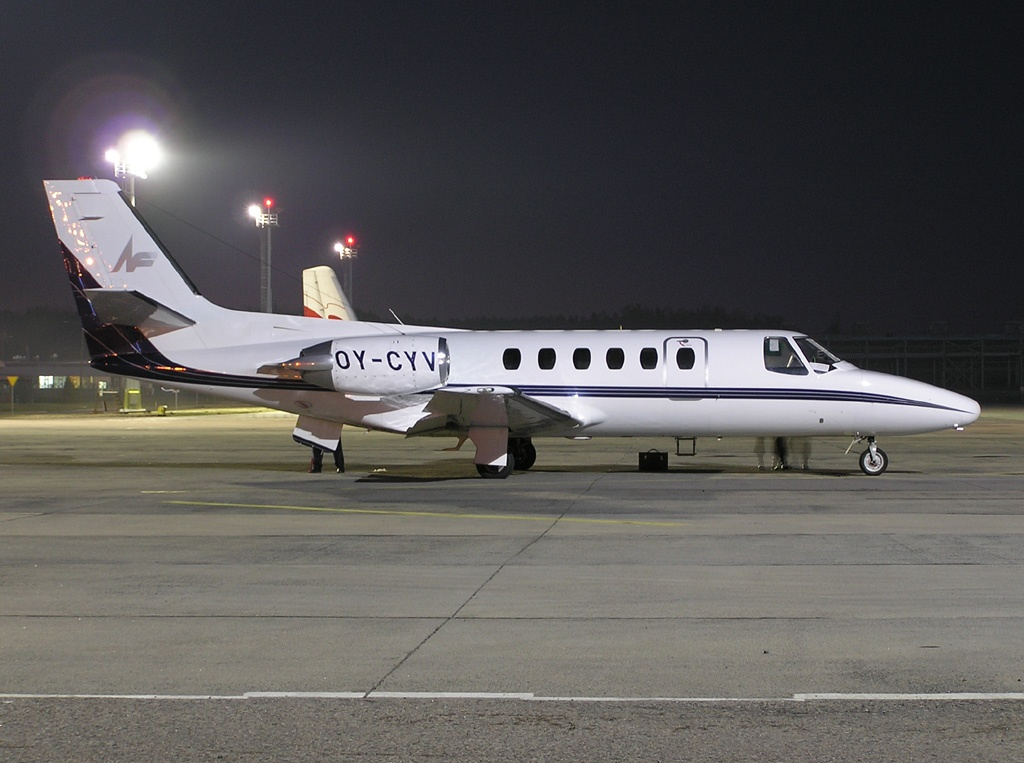
Cessna 550 of North Flying in 2004

Austria

- Tyrol Air Ambulance

Denmark

- North Flying

Canada

- Transport Canada

Oman

- Oman aviation services
- Oman Air

=== Airline operator ===
The Citation was also operated by at least one airline in scheduled passenger service, Enterprise Airlines in the U.S., from the late 1980s to 1990.

== Accidents and incidents ==
- On September 4, 2022, a Cessna 551 heading from Jerez, Spain, did not land at its intended destination, Cologne, Germany, but instead kept flying across Germany and the Baltic Sea where it eventually ran out of fuel and crashed in the sea off Ventspils, Latvia. The pilot had reported problems with air conditioning and pressurization early in the flight but later stopped responding to communications. A possible cause of the crash is that loss of cabin pressure rendered everyone on board unconscious.
- On May 22, 2025, a 1985 Cessna 551 heading from Teterboro Airport in New Jersey to Montgomery-Gibbs Executive Airport in San Diego, California crashed into military housing in the Murphy Canyon neighbourhood of San Diego, causing extensive fires and six casualties. The NTSB preliminary report identified several potentially problematic factors prior to the crash including the pilot not discussing alternate airport weather conditions with the controller and the destination airport’s weather data system and runway lights being disabled. The plane was well below the minimum legal altitude at the last checkpoint it passed through.
- On December 18, 2025, a Cessna 550 Citation II crashed while making an emergency landing at Statesville Regional Airport shortly after takeoff. The crash killed everyone on board: aircraft owner and semi-retired NASCAR driver Greg Biffle, his wife Cristina, their two children, and three others.

== Specifications (Cessna S550 Citation S/II) ==
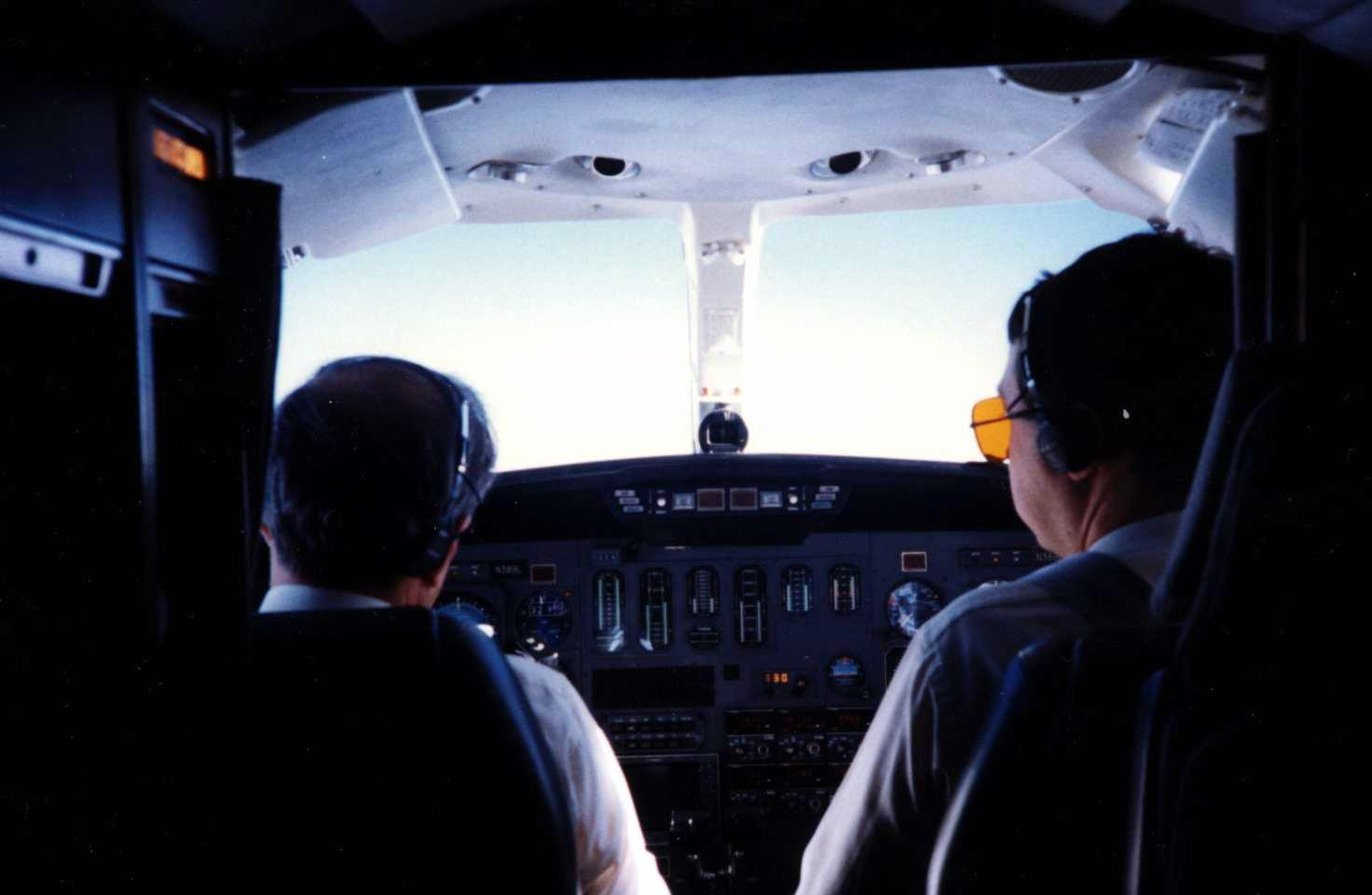
Cessna S550 Citation II flight deck while airborne

Data from Jane's All the World's Aircraft 1993–94

General characteristics

- Crew: Two pilots (One pilot on II/SP)
- Capacity: Six to eight passengers
- Length: 47 ft 8 1/2 in (14.542 m)
- Wingspan: 52 ft 2 1/2 in (15.913 m)
- Height: 15 ft 0 in (4.57 m)
- Wing area: 342.6 sq ft (31.83 m^{2})
- Airfoil: NACA 23000
- Empty weight: 8,059 lb (3,656 kg)
- Max takeoff weight: 15,100 lb (6,849 kg)
- Fuel capacity: 862 US gal (718 imp gal; 3,260 L) usable fuel
- Powerplant: 2 × Pratt & Whitney Canada JT15D-4B turbofans, 2,500 lbf (11 kN) thrust each

Performance(above 29,315 ft (8,935 m))

- Maximum speed: Mach 0.721
- Cruise speed: 403 kn (464 mph, 746 km/h) at 35,000 ft (11,000 m)
- Stall speed: 82 kn (94 mph, 152 km/h) (CAS)
- Range: 1,998 nmi (2,299 mi, 3,700 km) (with max fuel)
- Service ceiling: 43,000 ft (13,000 m) (max operating altitude)
- Rate of climb: 3,040 ft/min (15.4 m/s)

== See also ==
Related development

- Cessna Citation series
- Cessna Citation I
- Cessna Citation V

Aircraft of comparable role, configuration, and era

- Dassault Falcon 10
- Hawker 400
- Learjet 31
- Learjet 35/36
