= Cessna Citation III =

Business jet series

Citation III / VI / VII
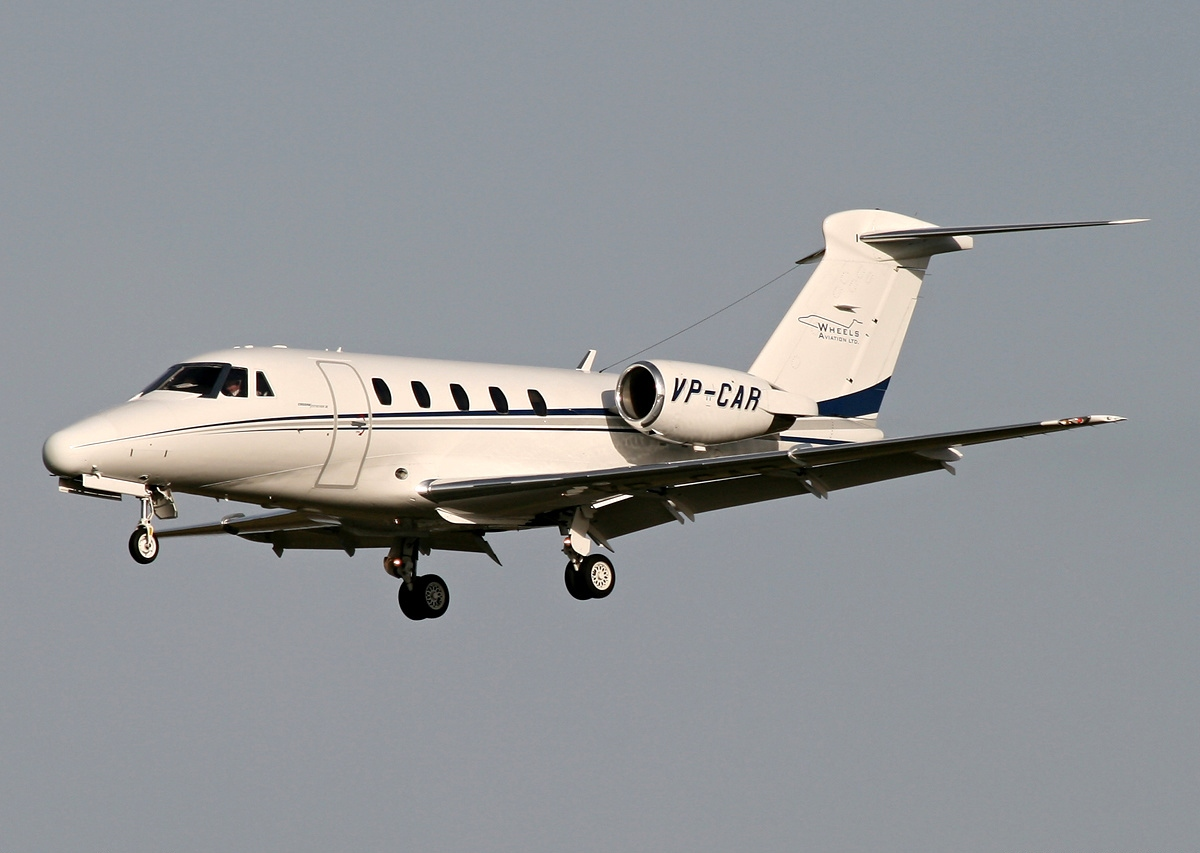
- Citation III

General information
- Type: Business Jet
- National origin: United States
- Manufacturer: Cessna
- Number built: 360: 202 III, 39 VI, 119 VII

History
- Manufactured: 1983-2000
- Introduction date: 1983 (III)
- First flight: May 30, 1979 (III)
- Developed into: Citation X

The Cessna Citation III is an American business jet produced by Cessna and part of the Citation family. Announced at the October 1976 NBAA convention, the Model 650 made its maiden flight on May 30, 1979, received its type certification on April 30, 1982, and was delivered between 1983 and 1992. The cheaper Citation VI was produced from 1991 to 1995 and the more powerful Citation VII was offered between 1992 and 2000; 360 of all variants were delivered, while a proposed transcontinental variant, the Citation IV, was canceled before reaching the prototype stage. An all new design, the Citation III had a 312 ft^{2} (29.0 m^{2}) swept wing for a 22,000 lb (10.0 t) MTOW and a 2,350 nmi (2,700 mi; 4,350 km) range, a T-tail and two 3,650–4,080 lbf (16.2–18.1 kN) TFE731 turbofans. Its fuselage cross section and cockpit were carried over and used in the later Citation X, Citation Excel and Citation Sovereign.

== Design and development ==
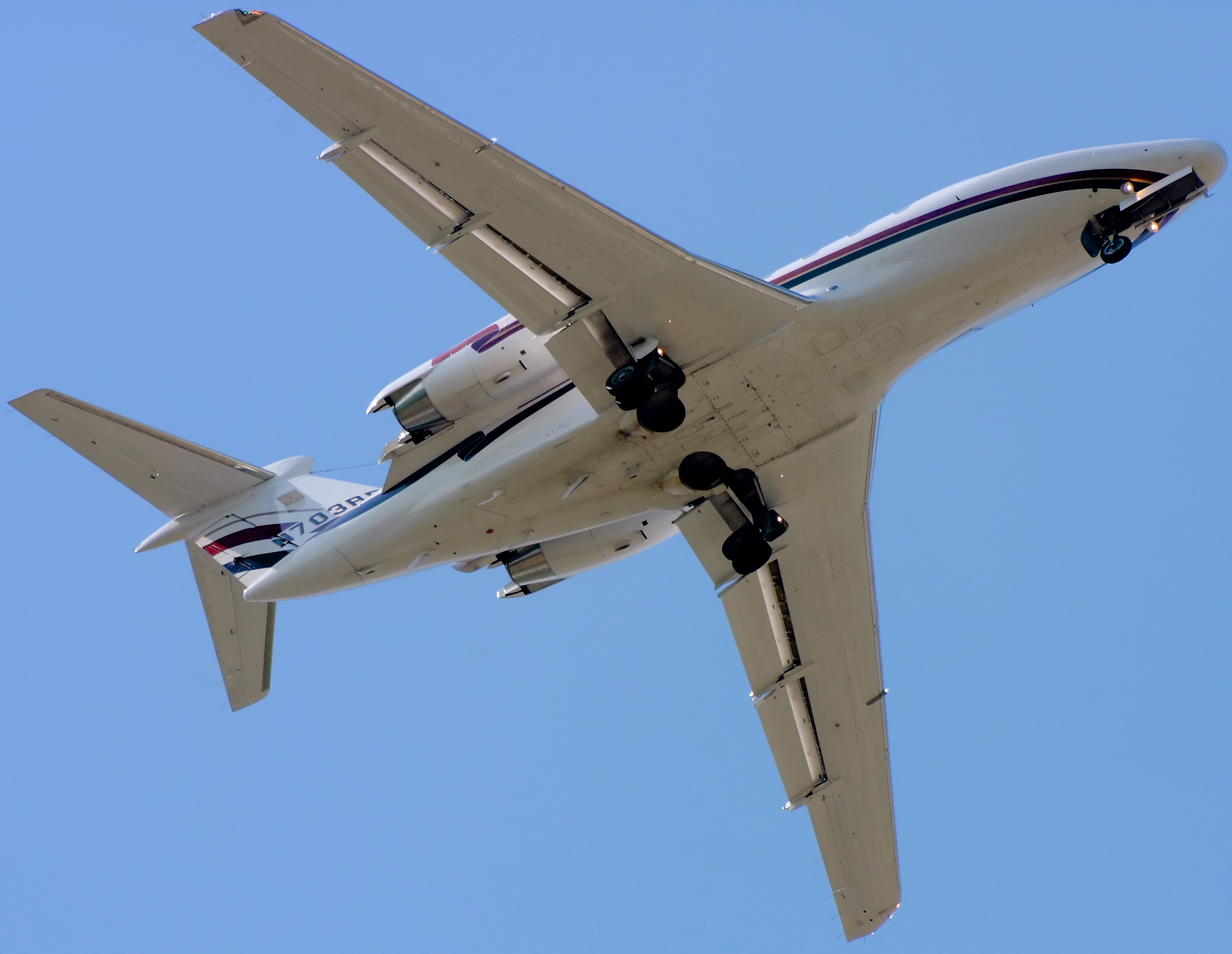
Viewed from below, showing wing sweep

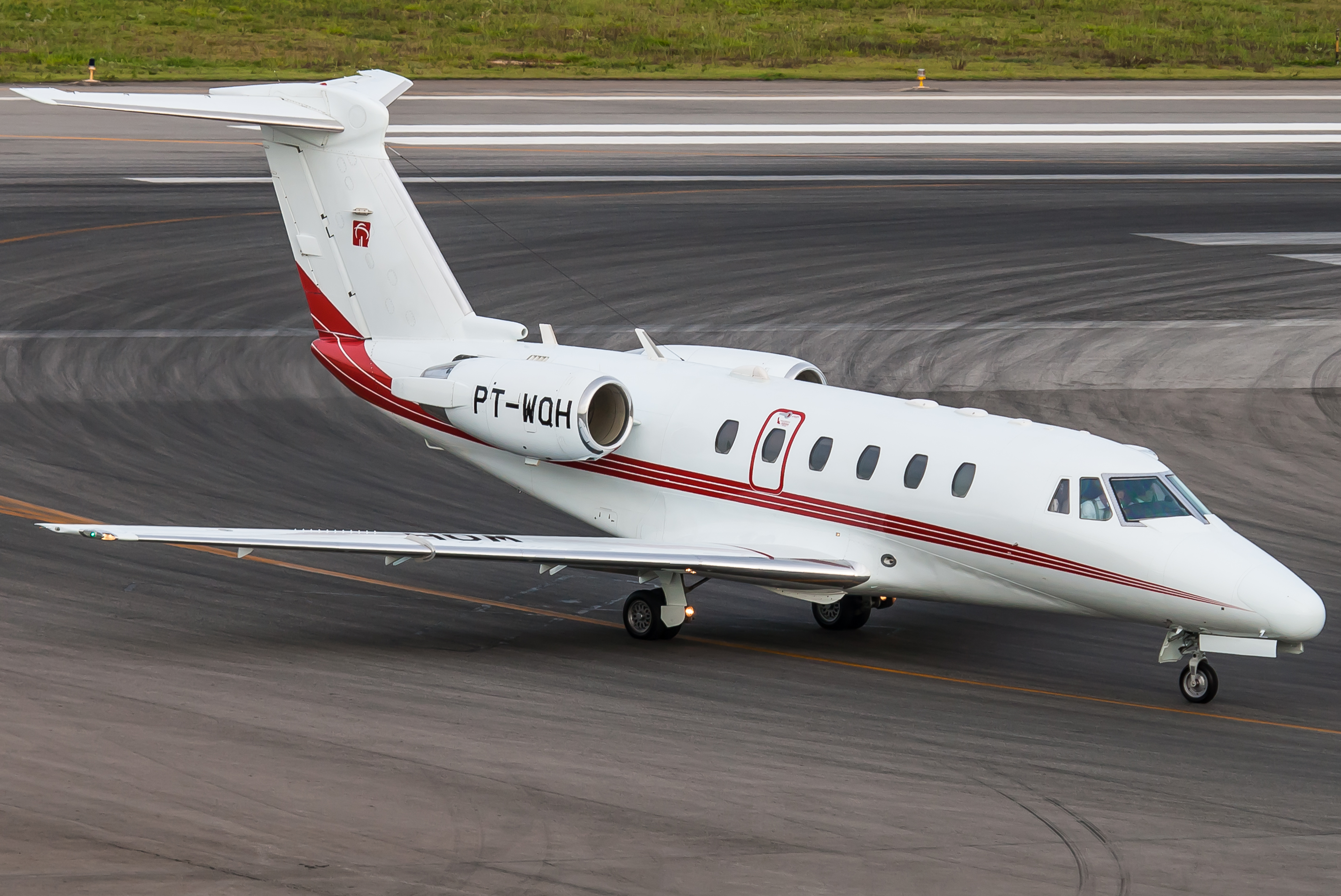
The 650 has a T-tail and two turbofans

In 1974, Cessna studied a long range model 700 stretch of its original Citation I powered by three JT15Ds called Citation III, with a 17,500 lb gross weight, an 8,000 lb empty weight and a 7,500 lb fuel capacity leaving 2,000 lb for the occupants, and targeting 1978 deliveries. This would have gave it a transcontinental range.

Cessna announced the 10 to 15 passengers, $2.5 million Citation III at the Fall 1976 NBAA convention. Scheduled for 1980, the model then presented had a cruciform tail and a cockpit similar to previous Citations. It would be powered by two TFE731 and would bquippeed with a supercritical 35° swept wing. Its maximum cruise was targeted for 470 kn (540 mph), the long-range version had a 19,300 lb gross weight and would cover 3,450 miles (3,000 nmi). The programme was to cost up to $50 million to launch.

By 1978 it had a new cockpit and a T-tail, the wing had an area of 312 ft^{2} (29.0 m^{2}) and an aspect ratio of 8.94, and an ER version targeted a MTOW of 18,300 pounds (8,300 kg) and an empty weight of 9,400 pounds (4,300 kg). Assembly of the first production aircraft began in January 1979 and the first prototype made its maiden flight in May. However, the program was dealt a setback when the Federal Aviation Administration (FAA) enacted new type certification regulations stemming from the May 1979 crash of American Airlines Flight 191, in which an engine separation on takeoff caused cascading flight control and warning system failures. The new regulations required aircraft manufacturers to mitigate failures of other aircraft systems that could result from the failure or separation of a jet engine, and the FAA demanded that the Citation III be modified to comply, requiring Cessna to make extensive changes to the fuel system, to increase separation between hydraulic and flight control lines, and to increase system redundancy. These changes in turn required the capacity of the aft fuselage fuel tank to be reduced by 900 lb (410 kg)—11% of the aircraft's total intended fuel load—thus rendering it infeasible for the jet to meet its range target.

The second prototype first flew in April 1980. By July, certification was put back by six months and first deliveries were scheduled 11 months later than originally planned. $40 million were spent on R&D and $25 million for certification, for a total spending of $150 million by first delivery including tooling. By October, the two prototypes had logged 400 hours in 372 flights and FAR-25 certification was expected in April 1982 with first deliveries in October. The certification delays and loss of range caused by the design changes, together with economic factors stemming from the early 1980s recession, resulted in a number of early-order cancellations. Despite this, the initial late 1982 production rate of one per month was expected to grow to seven per month by 1985.

The FAA approved the type certificate of the Model 650 Citation III on April 30, 1982. It was the first aircraft with a supercritical wing to be type certificated in the United States. The aircraft is flown by a crew of two and it can seat up to 13 passengers but a typical corporate interior will seat six to eight passengers.

It was developed in seven years for $240 million. The first production model, owned by golfer Arnold Palmer, set time to altitude aircraft records of 12 min 1 s to 12,000 m (39,000 ft), and 23 min 43 s to 15,000 m (49,000 ft), and an airspeed record from Gander Airport to Paris le Bourget in 5 h 13 min, averaging 429 kn (494 mph). Production continued for nine years until 1992, with a total of 202 Citation IIIs being built. By 2018, The Citation III/VI/VII can be had for $0.5-1.5 million.

The aircraft was equipped with a then-novel safety feature: in the event of an uncontrolled decompression of the cabin, the autoflight system's Emergency Descent Mode (EDM) activates (if the aircraft is above 34275 feet, the cabin altitude exceeds 13500 feet, and the autopilot is engaged) and places the aircraft in a 35° left bank for approximately 48 seconds to turn 90 degrees, and descends at V_{MO}-10 until reaching an altitude of 15,000 ft (4,600 m). However, the pilot has to manually deploy speedbrakes and spoilers, and retard throttles in order to achieve maximum descent rate.

== Variants ==
=== Citation IV: cancelled stretch ===
In 1988 Cessna studied a 4 ft (1.2 m) stretch, longer range Citation IV to better compete with the BAe 125 with new engines, either Garretts or Pratt & Whitney PW300s. At the time, the 473 kn (544 mph), 2,385 nmi (2,745 mi) range Citation III was selling for $6.125 million. Cessna launched the $8.8 million Citation IV at the October 1989 NBAA convention in Atlanta. It was expected to fly in early 1992, to be certified at the end of the year and to enter service in mid-1993. Powered by Garrett TFE731-4s, wingspan increased by 10% to 58.7 ft (17.9 m) and wing area was up almost a quarter. Fuel capacity increased from 7,330 to 8,700 lb (3.32 to 3.95 t), max takeoff weight attained 24,000 lb (10.9 t) and the cabin was 38 in (97 cm) longer. Performance was increased and it had a 2,710 nmi (3,120 mi; 5,020 km) transcontinental range. In 1990, Cessna cancelled the bigger, longer range and more expensive Citation IV to offer the cheaper VI and more capable VII. No Citation IV prototype was ever completed; had it reached production, the aircraft would have been certified as the Model 670.

=== Citation VI: lower cost ===
For $1.4 million less than the $8.1 million III, the Citation VI has a standard interior and was to be delivered from April 1991. The Citation VI was certificated under an amendment to the original Model 650 type certificate. It first flew in 1991 and 39 were built before it was discontinued in May 1995. Cessna found that few potential customers would settle for a relatively austere budget-focused mid-sized jet; most were focused on luxury and prestige, and were more likely to either buy a preowned business jet with the features they wanted, or pay the premium for the more upscale cabin furnishings offered in the Citation VII.

=== Citation VII: premium version ===
For $1.65 million more than the III, the Citation VII has more powerful engines to improve the payload-range and hot and high performance. The cabin interior was customized to each buyer's preference, with a wide range of trim and seat fabrics, galley equipment, and in-flight entertainment options, and the aircraft came with a full-width aft lavatory that could be outfitted as a dressing room. It first flew in February 1991 and was certificated in January 1992 under an amendment to the original Model 650 type certificate. In 1996 Executive Jet Aviation ordered 20 for its Netjets fractional ownership programme. After the launch of the $12 million Citation Sovereign due for certification in the third quarter of 2003 and first delivery for the first quarter of 2004, the final Citation 650 was set to roll off the assembly line on 15 September 2000, 119 were built.

== Operators ==
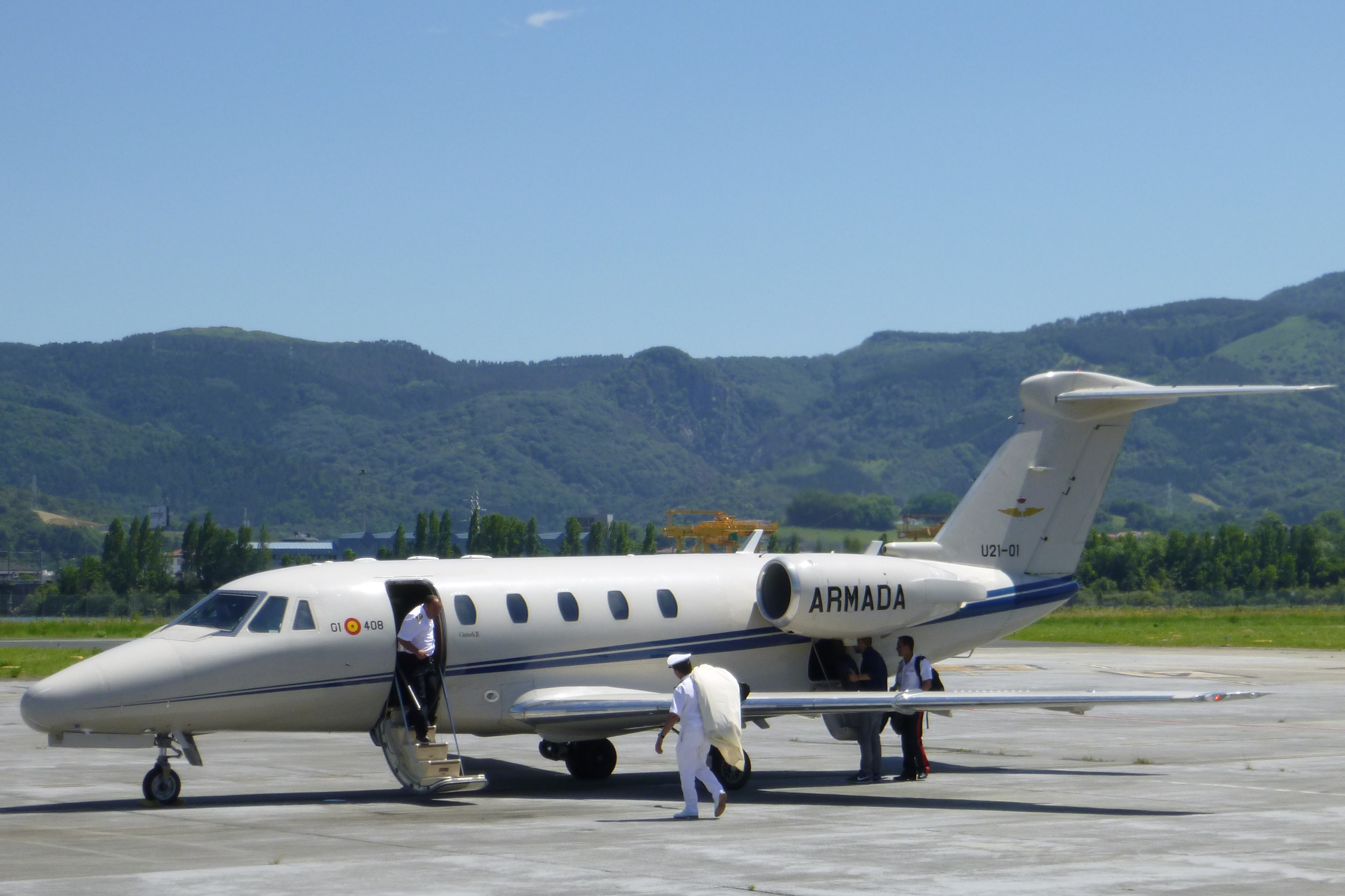
Spanish Navy Citation VII, doors open

=== Military operators ===
Spain

- Spanish Navy - One Citation VII

== Specifications (III/VI) ==
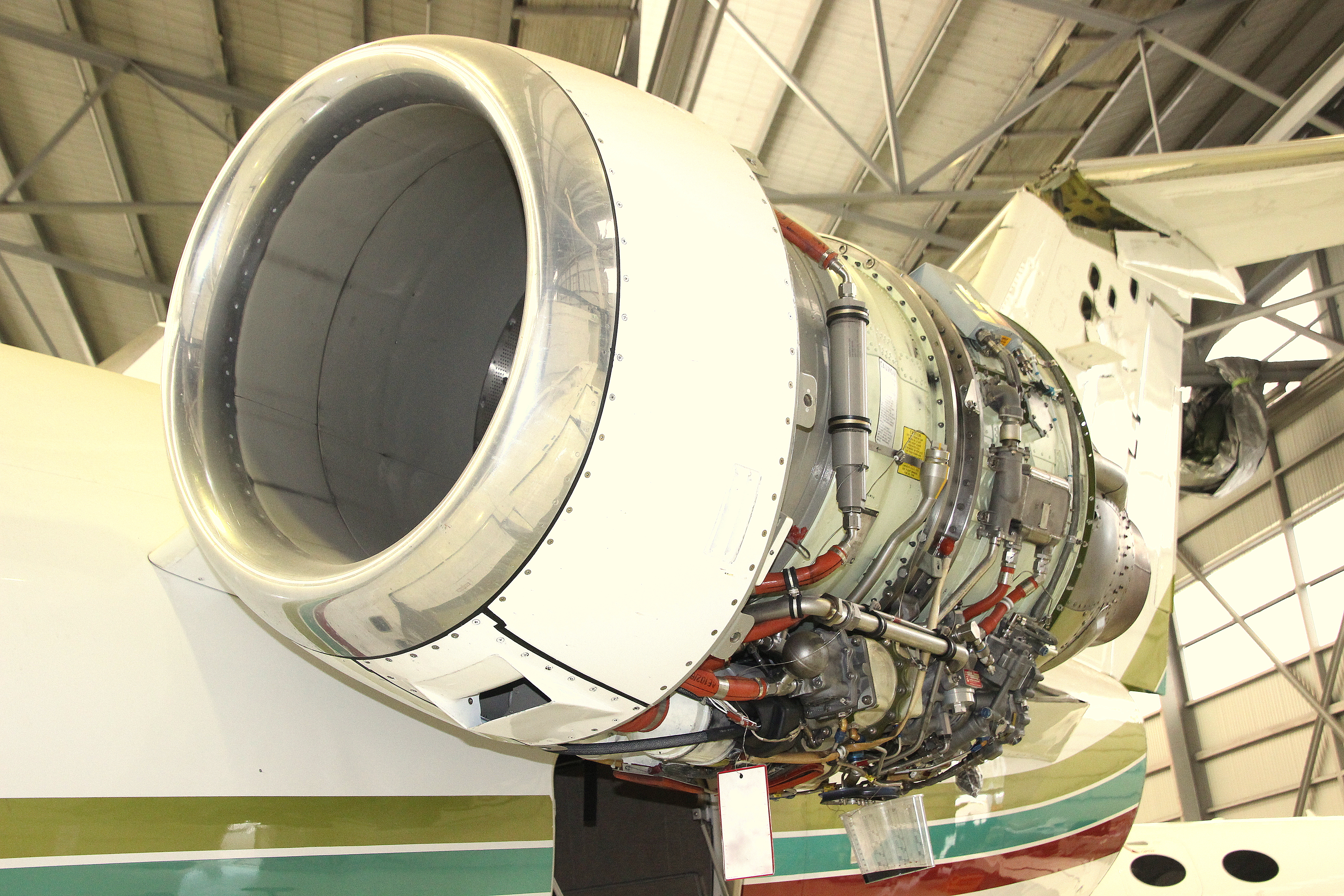
A TFE731-4R of a Citation VII

Data from Frawley

General characteristics

- Crew: 2
- Capacity: 6-9 Passengers
- Length: 55 ft 5 in (16.90 m)
- Wingspan: 53 ft 6 in (16.31 m)
- Height: 16 ft 10 in (5.12 m)
- Wing area: 312 sq ft (29.0 m^{2})
- Aspect ratio: 9.17
- Empty weight: 11,810 lb (5,357 kg) operating empty: 12,200 pounds (5,500 kg), VII: 11,720 pounds (5,320 kg)
- Max takeoff weight: 22,002 lb (9,980 kg) VII: 22,450 pounds (10,180 kg)
- Powerplant: 2 × Garrett TFE731-3B Turbofans, 3,650 lbf (16.2 kN) thrust each VII: 4080lbf (18.2kN) TFE731-4R

Performance

- Maximum speed: Mach MMo Mach .851 (566 mph; 492 kn; 912 km/h)
- Cruise speed: 472 kn (543 mph, 874 km/h) max, VII: 476 kn (548 mph; 882 km/h)
- Range: 2,348 nmi (2,702 mi, 4,348 km) 2 crew and 4 passengers, VII: 2,220 nmi (2,550 mi; 4,110 km) with 6 passengers
- Service ceiling: 51,000 ft (16,000 m)
- Rate of climb: 3,805 ft/min (19.33 m/s) initially, VII: 4,442 ft/min (22.57 m/s)

== See also ==
- Cessna Citation family

Related development

- Cessna Citation X
- Cessna Citation Excel
- Cessna Citation Sovereign

Aircraft of comparable role, configuration, and era

- British Aerospace 125
- Embraer Phenom 300
- Embraer Legacy 450/500 and Praetor 500/600
- IAI Astra
- Learjet 55/60
