= Cessna Citation family =

Business jet family

Citation family
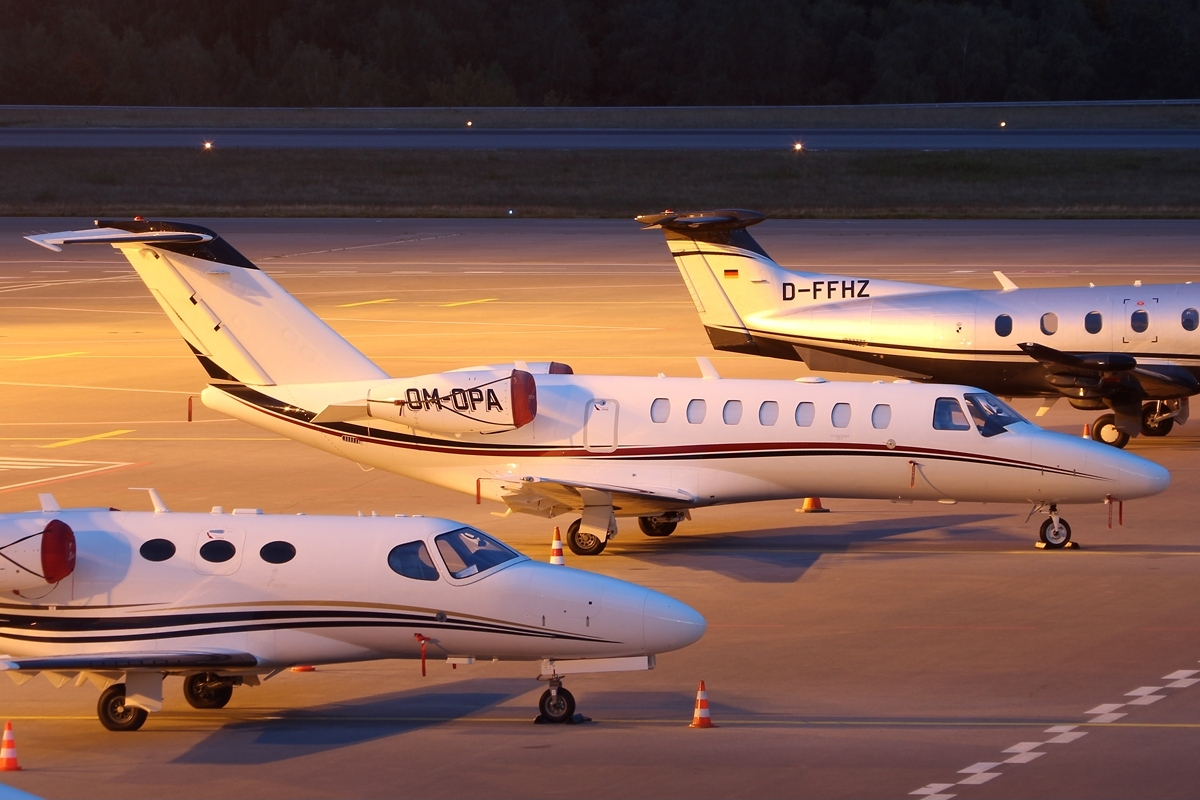
- A Cessna 525B CJ3 behind a Citation Mustang

General information
- Type: Business jet
- Manufacturer: Cessna
- Number built: 8,000

History
- Introduction date: 1972
- First flight: 15 September 1969
- Variants: Citation I / I/SP; Citation II/SII/Bravo; Citation III-VI-VII; Cessna Citation V/Ultra/Encore; Citation Excel/XLS/XLS+/Ascend; CitationJet/CJ series Citation Mustang; Citation X Citation Sovereign; Citation Latitude; Citation Longitude; Citation Hemisphere

The Cessna Citation is a family of business jets manufactured by Cessna that entered service in 1972. In the fifty years following the type's first flight in 1969, more than 7,500 Citations were delivered, forming the largest business jet fleet in the world. Deliveries reached 8,000 by 2022, while logging over 41 million flight hours.

The line started with the small prototype Citation I (initially called FanJet 500 and sold as Cessna 500 Citation) flying on 15 September 1969, produced until 1985, and developed into the 1978-2006 Citation II/Bravo, the 1989-2011 Citation V/Ultra/Encore, and the CitationJet since 1993. The stand-up cabin height Citation III/VI/VII was delivered from 1983 to 2000; its fuselage was reused in the Citation X/X+ delivered from 1996 to 2018, the Sovereign from 2004 to 2021 and the Excel since 1998. The Mustang was a Very Light Jet delivered from 2006 to 2017. The flat-floor cabin Latitude has been manufactured since 2015, and the larger Longitude from 2019.

The aircraft are named after Citation, a champion American Thoroughbred racehorse who won the American Triple Crown.

== Lineage ==
Citation deliveries timeline
1970s									1980s										1990s										2000s										2010s										2020s
1	2	3	4	5	6	7	8	9	0	1	2	3	4	5	6	7	8	9	0	1	2	3	4	5	6	7	8	9	0	1	2	3	4	5	6	7	8	9	0	1	2	3	4	5	6	7	8	9	0	1	2	3	4	5
																																			510 Mustang
																						525 CitationJet/CJ1													CJ1+							M2										M2 Gen2
500 Citation I^{1}																													525A CJ2					CJ2+
						501 Citation I/SP																											525B CJ3										CJ3+											CJ3 Gen2
							550 Citation II^{2} / 551 Citation II/SP																																525C CJ4											CJ4 Gen2
													S550 Citation S/II													550 Bravo
																		560 Citation V					Ultra						Encore							Encore+
																											560XL Excel						XLS					XLS+																Ascend
												650 Citation III									VI/VII												680 Sovereign									Sovereign+
																																												680A Latitude
																									750 Citation X																		X+					700 Longitude
1	2	3	4	5	6	7	8	9	0	1	2	3	4	5	6	7	8	9	0	1	2	3	4	5	6	7	8	9	0	1	2	3	4	5	6	7	8	9	0	1	2	3	4	5	6	7	8	9	0	1	2	3	4	5
Fuselage cross-section: = Citation I, = Citation III, = Latitude; projects: 670 Citation IV, Columbus, Hemisphere
Footnotes:^{1} Early aircraft sold as "Citation" without "I" suffix • ^{2} Replaced by S/II in mid 1984, reintroduced late 1985

== Models ==
=== Citation I ===
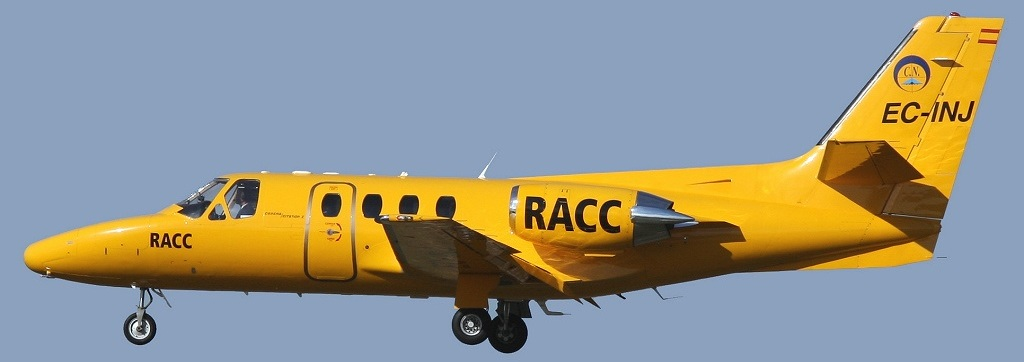
Model 500 Citation I

The Cessna 500 Citation I is a small business jet designed and produced by Cessna. It was the first business jet to be designed for single-pilot operations. The Citation I became the basis of the Citation family.

Originally marketed at the Fanjet 500 and intentionally designed to cater towards Cessna's traditional customer base of personal owner-pilots, the existence of the program was announced in October 1968. The prototype, equipped with a straight wing and powered by a pair of JT15D turbofan engines, performed its maiden flight on September 15, 1969, and it was type certified as the 500 Citation on September 9, 1971. Development of the type continued through the 1970s, leading to the Citation I being introduced in 1976 as well as the 501 Citation I/SP single-pilot variant becoming available in 1977. Production of the Citation I was terminated in 1985, by which point 689 aircraft across all variants had been produced. The Citation I was further developed into the Citation II.

=== Citation II/Bravo ===
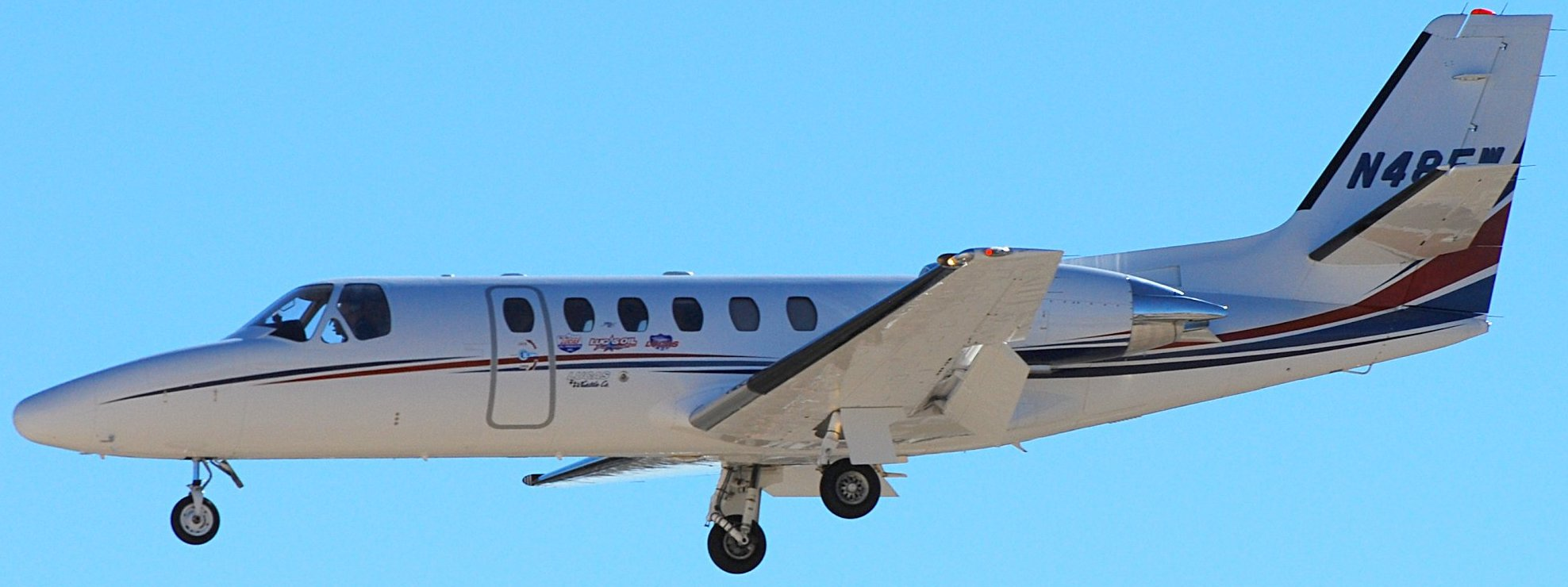
Model 550 Citation II

Stretched from the Citation I, the Model 550 was announced in September 1976, first flew on January 31, 1977, and was certified in March 1978. The II/SP is a single pilot version, the improved S/II first flew on February 14, 1984 and the Citation Bravo, a stretched S/II with new avionics and more powerful P&WC PW530A turbofans, first flew on April 25, 1995. The United States Navy adopted a version of the S/II as the T-47A. Production ceased in 2006 after 1,184 of all variants were delivered.

=== Citation III/IV/VI/VII ===
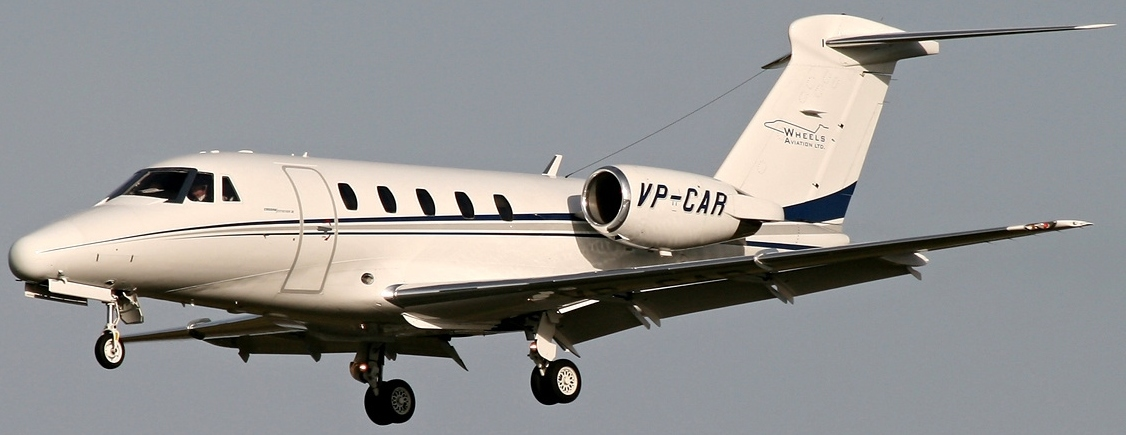
Model 650 Citation III

Announced at the October 1976 NBAA convention, the Model 650 made its maiden flight on May 30, 1979, received its type certification on April 30, 1982, and was delivered between 1983 and 1992. The cheaper Citation VI was produced from 1991 to 1995 and the more powerful Citation VII was offered between 1992 and 2000; 360 of all variants were delivered, while a proposed transcontinental variant, the Citation IV, was canceled before reaching the prototype stage. An all new design, the Citation III had a 312 ft^{2} (29.0 m^{2}) swept wing for a 22,000 lb (10.0 t) MTOW and a 2,350 nmi (4,350 km) range, a T-tail and two 3,650–4,080 lbf (16.2–18.1 kN) TFE731 turbofans. Its fuselage cross section and cockpit were carried over and used in the later Citation X, Citation Excel and Citation Sovereign.

=== Citation V/Ultra/Encore ===
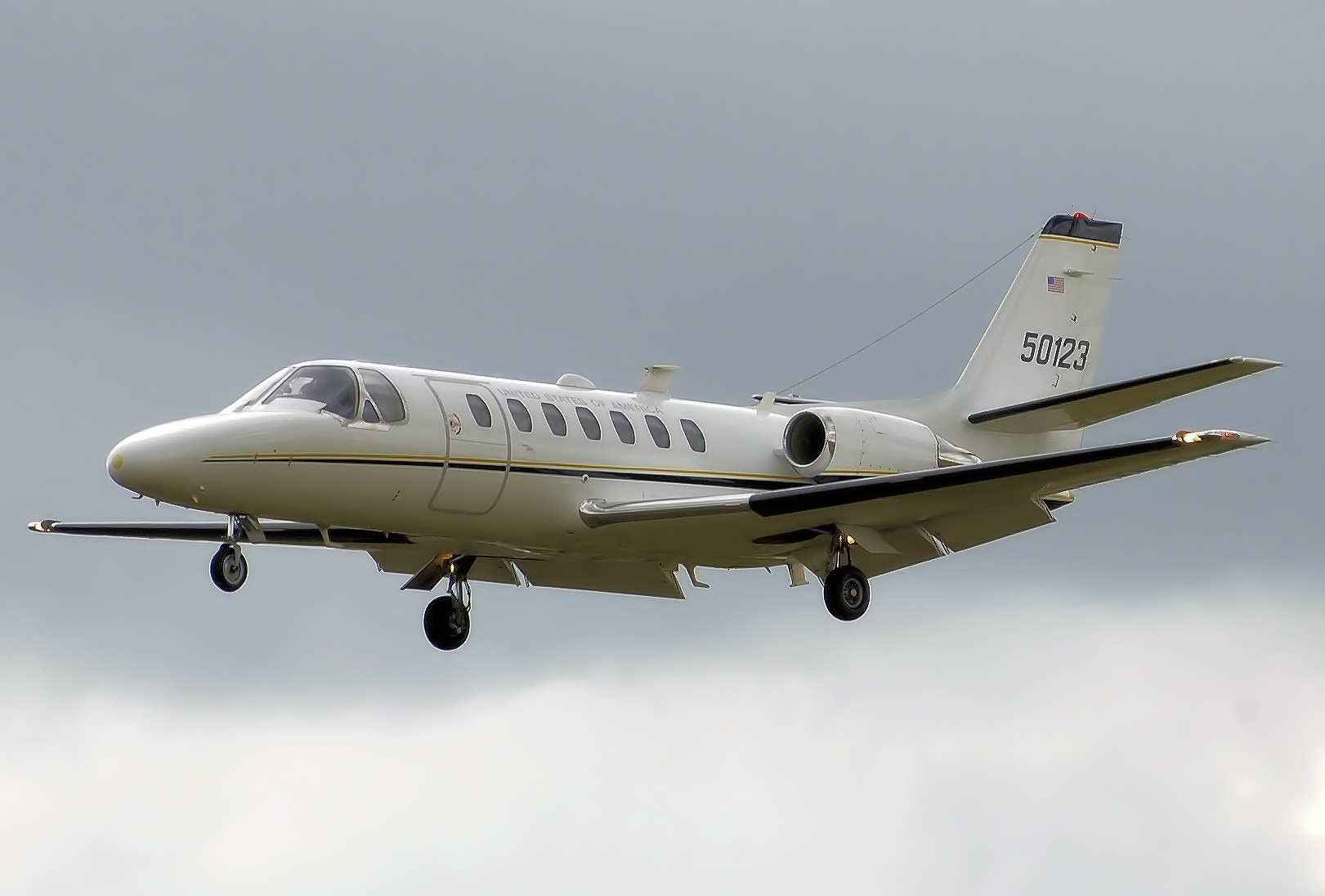
Model 560 Citation V (U.S. Army UC-35A)

The first Model 560 prototype, a stretched version of the Citation S/II, flew in August 1987 and was certified on December 9, 1988. The upgraded Citation Ultra was announced in September 1993; the Citation Encore, upgraded with PW535 turbofans, was announced in 1998 and later upgraded as the Encore+. Between 1989 and 2011, 774 of all variants were produced. Its U.S. military designation is UC-35 as an executive transport and OT-47B as a reconnaissance aircraft.

=== CitationJet/CJ/M2 ===
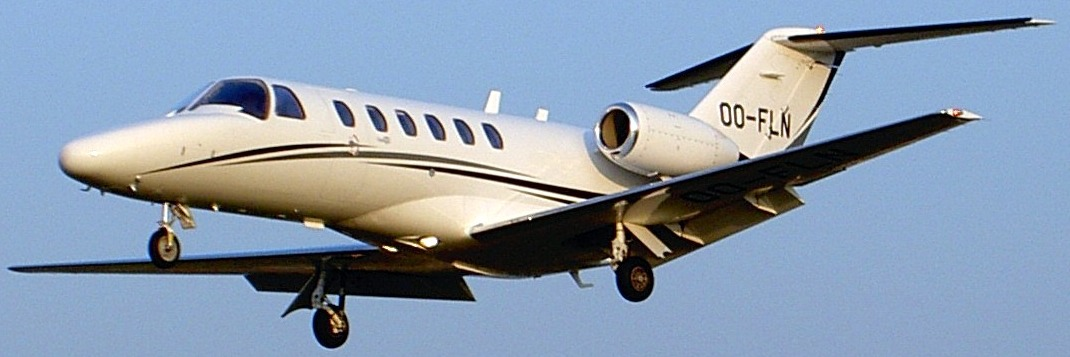
Model 525A CitationJet CJ2

Launched in October 1989, the first flight of the Model 525 was on April 29, 1991. Federal Aviation Administration (FAA) certification was awarded on October 16, 1992, and the first aircraft was delivered on March 30, 1993. The CJ series are powered by two Williams FJ44 engines; the design uses the Citation II's forward fuselage with a new carry-through section wing and a T-tail.

The original CitationJet model was updated into the CJ1/CJ1+/M2 variants, and the CJ1 was stretched into the CJ2/CJ2+, which was built between 2000 and 2016. Two additional fuselage stretches yielded the CJ3/CJ3+, built from December 2004 to present, and finally the CJ4, which features a moderately swept wing and has been built since 2010. By June 2017, 2,000 of all variants had been delivered. In 2021, Cessna announced updated versions of the M2, CJ3, and CJ4 marketed as the Citation Gen2, and in 2024 the company announced plans for the Citation Gen3, which is expected to enter service in 2026.

=== CitationJet (trainer) ===
The Model 526 CitationJet was a twin-engine, two-seat tandem military trainer developed from the Model 525 as a candidate for the Joint Primary Aircraft Training System competition (JPATS). The two models share 75% of their parts, including wing, engines, landing gear, and other systems. First flown in December 1993, the 526 did not succeed at the JPATS contest, and only two examples were built in total.

=== Citation X/X+ ===
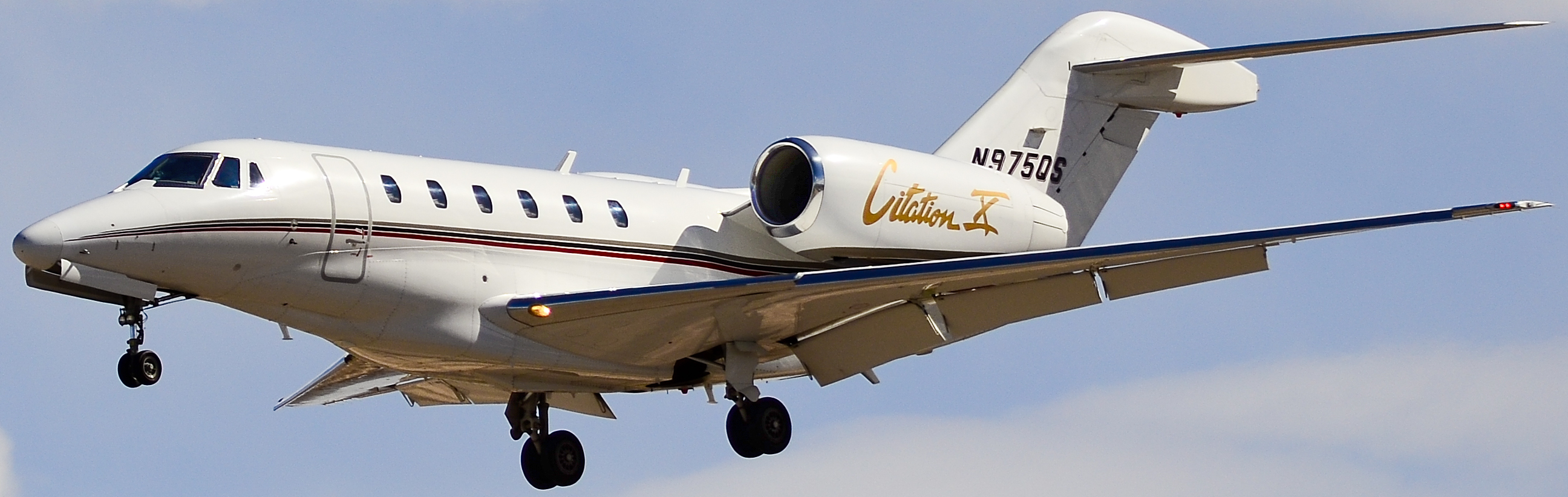
Model 750 Citation X

Announced at the October 1990 NBAA convention, the Model 750 made its maiden flight on December 21, 1993, received its type certification on June 3, 1996, and was first delivered in July 1996. The updated Citation X+ was offered from 2012 with a 14 in (360 mm) cabin stretch and upgraded systems. Keeping the Citation III fuselage cross section, it has a new 37° swept wing with an area of 527 ft² (49 m^{2}) for a fast Mach 0.935 M_{MO} and a 36,600 lb (16.6 t) MTOW for a 3,460 nmi (6,408 km) range, a T-tail and two 7,034 lbf (31.29 kN) AE3007 turbofans. After 338 deliveries, production ended in 2018.

=== Excel/XLS/XLS+/Ascend ===
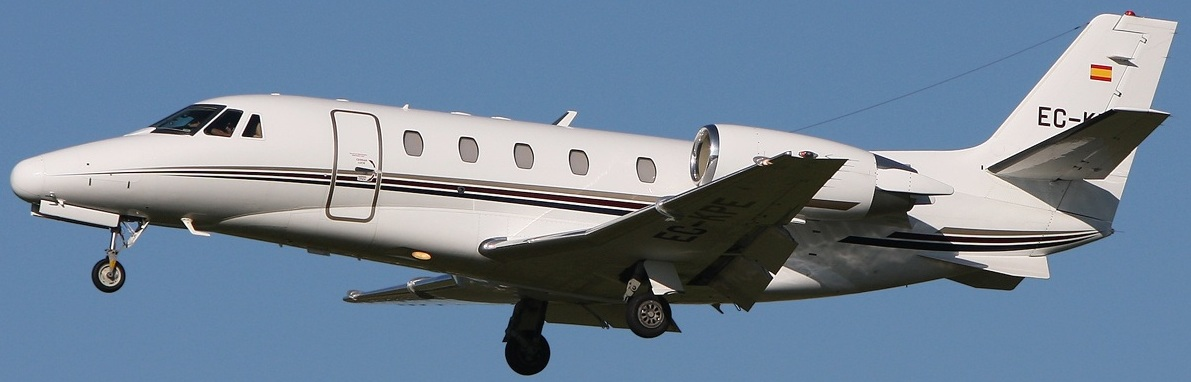
Model 560XL Citation Excel

Announced in October 1994, the Model 560XL first flew on February 29, 1996, certification was granted in April 1998, and over 1,000 have been delivered. The 2,100 nmi-range (3,900 km), 20,200 lb (9,200 kg) MTOW jet is powered by two 3,650–4,080 lbf (16.2–18.1 kN) PW545 turbofans, has the cruciform tail and unswept supercritical wing of the Citation V (560), and a slightly shortened Citation X stand-up cabin. The XLS 2004 update had upgraded engines and a glass cockpit and the 2008 XLS+ had upgraded engines and a revised nose. The Citation Ascend, which entered service in 2025, has interior, communications and avionics updates, a flat cabin floor, and enlarged windows.

=== Sovereign ===
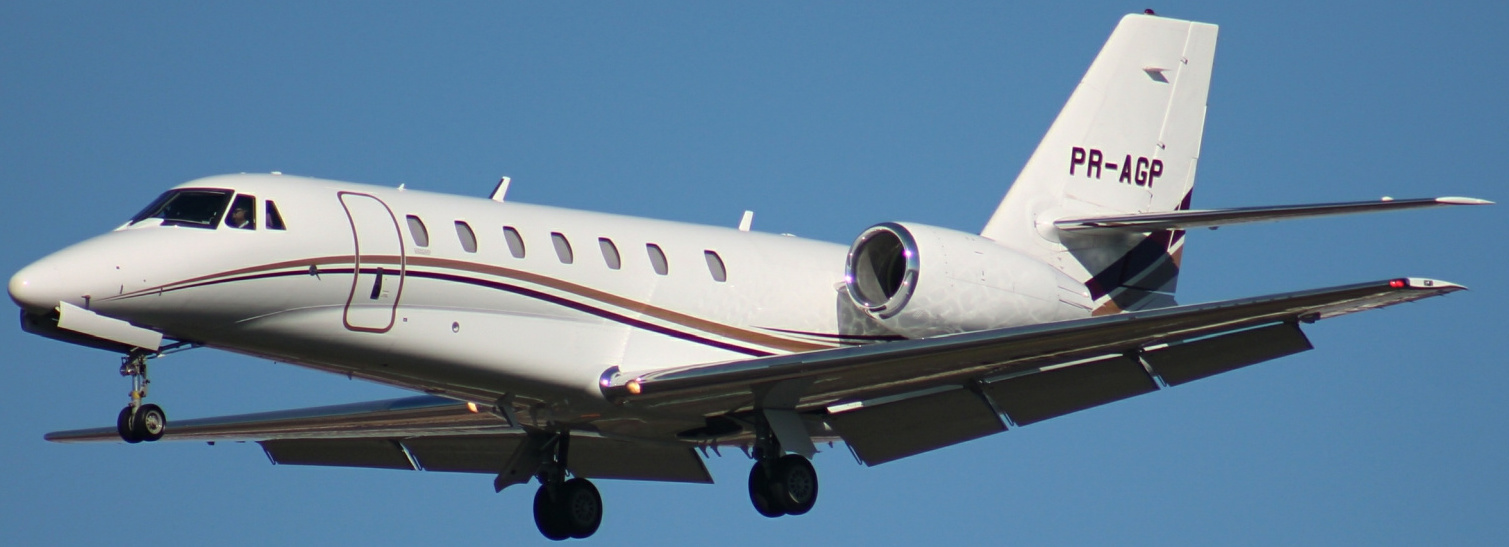
Model 680 Citation Sovereign

Announced at the 1998 NBAA convention, the Model 680 made its maiden flight in February 2002, certification was awarded on June 2, 2004, and deliveries began in late September. The Citation Excel fuselage was stretched and joined with an all-new, larger wing and more powerful Pratt & Whitney Canada PW306C engines for increased maximum takeoff weight and a 3,200 nmi (5,900 km) range. The improved Sovereign+ was announced at the October 2012 NBAA for a first flight in April 2013 and deliveries in December, with added winglets and an improved flight deck and engines.

=== Mustang ===
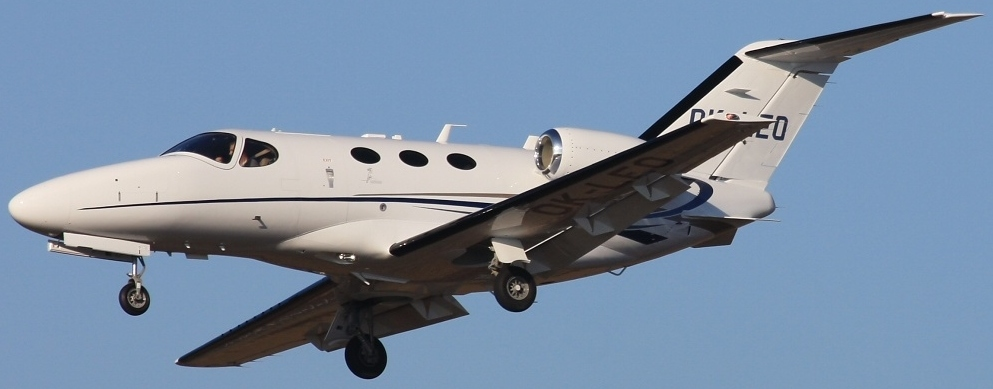
Model 510 Citation Mustang

Launched at the 2002 NBAA convention, the Model 510 first flew on April 23, 2005. It received its FAA type certification on September 8, 2006, and was first delivered on November 22. Production ended in 2017 after 479 aircraft were built. The 8,645 lb (3,921 kg) maximum take-off weight jet is powered by two Pratt & Whitney Canada PW615F 1,460 lbf (6.5 kN) turbofans, can reach 340 kn (630 km/h), and has a range of 1,167 nmi (2,161 km).

=== Columbus ===
The Model 850 was launched in February 2008 and cancelled in July 2009. It would have been the largest model of the family at the time. Powered by 8,830 lbf (39.3 kN) PW810 turbofans and a 4,000 nmi (7,400 km) range, the $27 million aircraft had a 709 sq ft (66 m^{2}), 30° swept wing.

=== Latitude ===
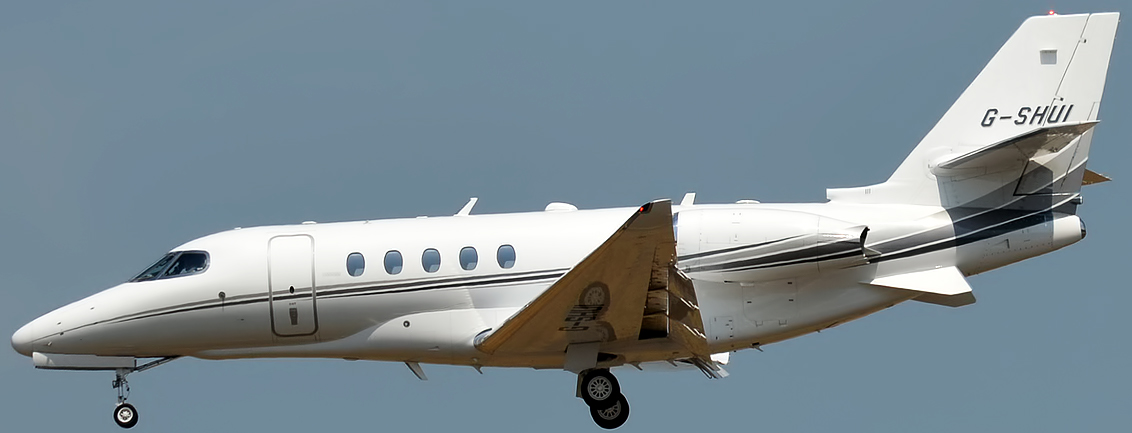
Model 680A Citation Latitude

The Model 680A was announced at the 2011 NBAA convention, the prototype first flew on 18 February 2014, it achieved FAA certification on June 5, 2015, and first deliveries began on August 27. It retains the Model 680 Sovereign wing, twin P&WC PW306D turbofans and cruciform tail and adds a new stand-up circular fuselage with a flat floor, which was kept in the stretched, re-winged, and re-engined Cessna Citation Longitude.

=== Longitude ===
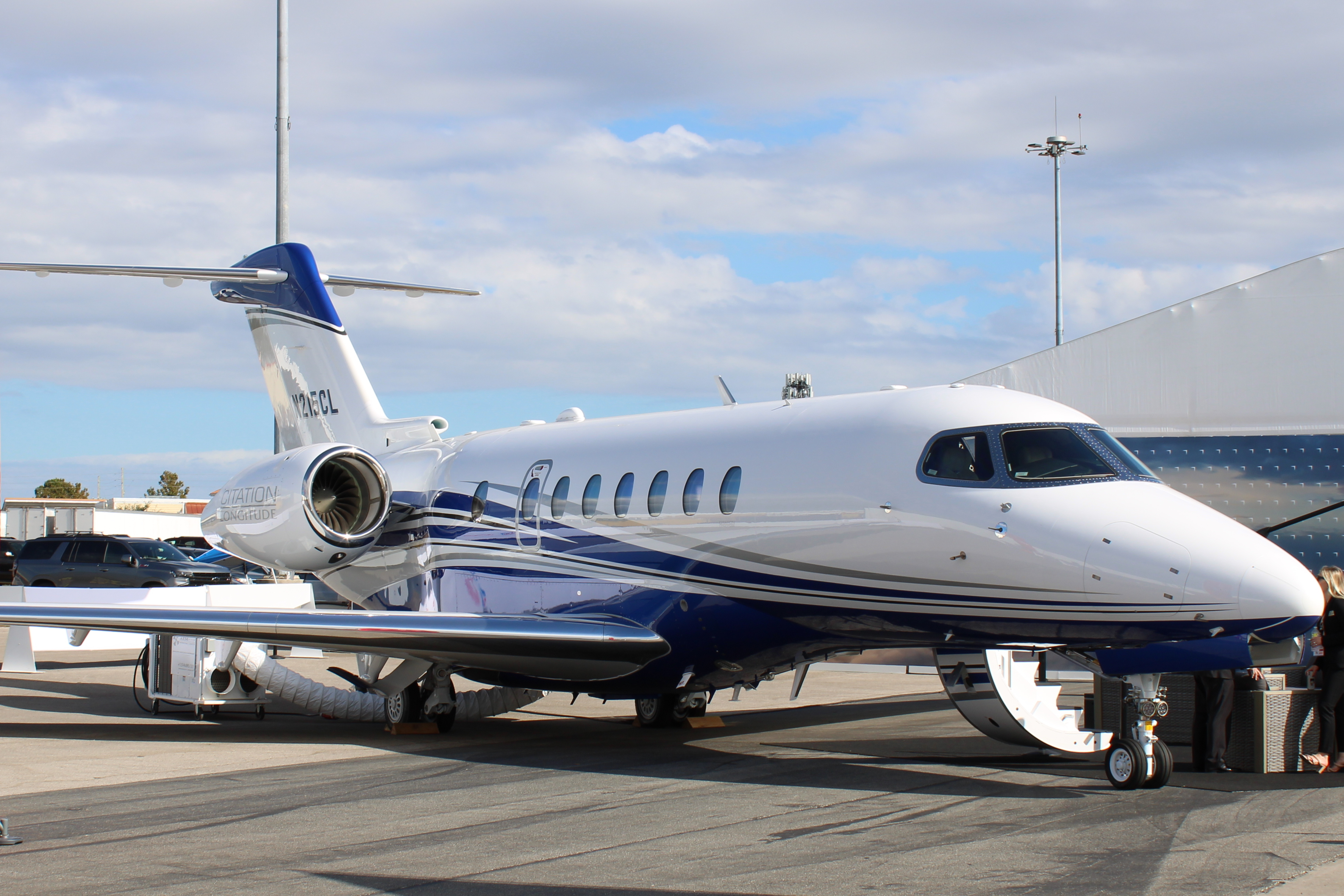
Model 700 Citation Longitude

Announced at the May 2012 EBACE, the Model 700 made its first flight on October 8, 2016, with certification obtained in September 2019. The aluminum airframe has the fuselage cross-section of the Citation Latitude, stretched by a seat row. Powered by Honeywell HTF7000 turbofans, it has a new ~28° swept wing and a T-tail for a 3,500 nmi (4,000 mi; 6,500 km) range.

=== Hemisphere ===
Announced in November 2015, it was expected to fly in 2019 but its development was suspended in April 2018 due to a delay in the development of its Safran Silvercrest engines. It was designed for Mach 0.9 and a 4,500 nautical miles (8,300 km) range.

== Current models ==
Model	Length	Span	Area	Sweep	Inside	Pax.	MTOW	Cruise	Range	Engines	Thrust
525 Citation M2	42 ft 7 in 12.98 m	47 ft 3 in 14.40 m	240 sq ft 22 m^{2}	0 °	58 in 1.5 m	7	10,800 lb 4,900 kg	404 kn 748 km/h	1,540 nmi 2,850 km	2 FJ44-1AP-21	3,930 lbf 17.5 kN
525 Citation CJ3+	51 ft 2 in 15.60 m	53 ft 4 in 16.26 m	294 sq ft 27.3 m^{2}	0 °	58 in 1.5 m	9	13,870 lb 6,290 kg	416 kn 770 km/h	2,040 nmi 3,780 km	2 FJ44-3A	5,640 lbf 25.1 kN
525 Citation CJ4	53 ft 4 in 16.26 m	50 ft 10 in 15.49 m	330 sq ft 31 m^{2}	12.5 °	58 in 1.5 m	10	17,110 lb 7,760 kg	451 kn 835 km/h	2,170 nmi 4,020 km	2 FJ44-4A	7,242 lbf 32.21 kN
560XL Citation XLS+	52 ft 6 in 16.00 m	56 ft 4 in 17.17 m	370 sq ft 34 m^{2}	0 °	68 in 1.7 m	9	20,200 lb 9,200 kg	441 kn 817 km/h	2,100 nmi 3,900 km	2 PW545C	8,238 lbf 36.64 kN
680A Citation Latitude	62 ft 3 in 18.97 m	72 ft 4 in 22.05 m	543 sq ft 50.4 m^{2}	16.3 °	77 in 2.0 m	9	30,800 lb 14,000 kg	446 kn 826 km/h	2,850 nmi 5,280 km	2 PW306D1	11,814 lbf 52.55 kN
700 Citation Longitude	73 ft 2 in 22.30 m	68 ft 11 in 21.01 m	537 sq ft 49.91 m^{2}	28.6 °	77 in 1.96 m	12	39,500 lb 17,917 kg	476 ktas 882 km/h	3,500 nmi 6,482 km	2 HTF7700L	15,200 lbf 68 kN

== See also ==
Related development

- Cessna Citation I / I/SP
- Cessna Citation II/SII/Bravo
- Cessna Citation III/VI/VII
- Cessna Citation V/Ultra/Encore
- Cessna Citation X
- Cessna Citation Excel/XLS/XLS+
- Cessna CitationJet/CJ series
- Cessna Citation Sovereign
- Cessna Citation Mustang
- Cessna Citation Columbus
- Cessna Citation Longitude

Aircraft of comparable role, configuration, and era

- Bombardier Aviation Business jets
- Dassault Falcon
- Embraer Business Jets
- Gulfstream Aerospace
