= Cessna Citation V =

Small business jet delivered by Cessna between 1989 and 2011

Citation V/Ultra Citation Encore/Encore+
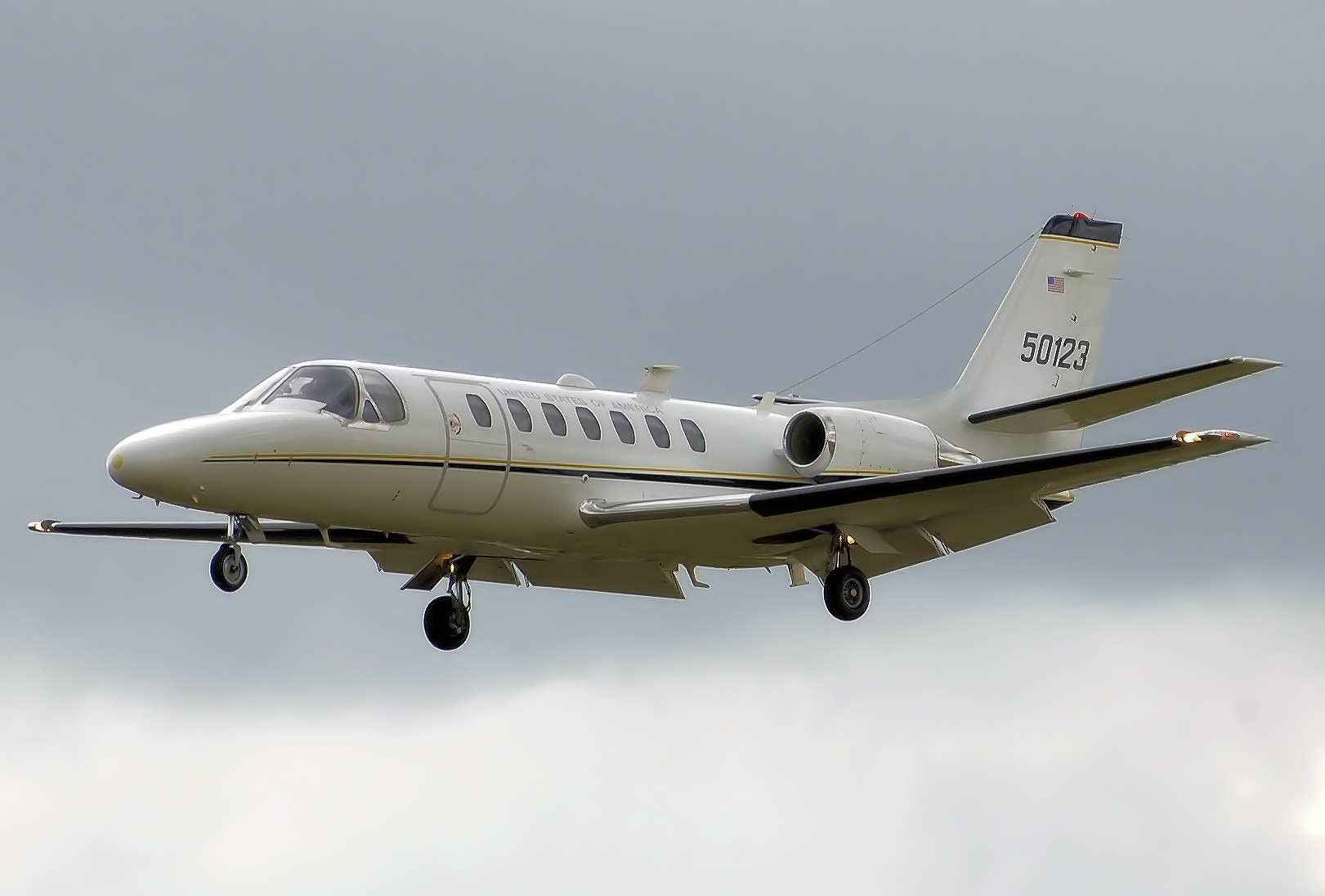
- The Citation 560 (here a U.S. Army UC-35A) is a small business jet with twin aft-mounted turbofans

General information
- Type: Corporate jet
- National origin: United States
- Manufacturer: Cessna
- Primary users: United States Army United States Marine Corps
- Number built: 774 : 262 V, 279 Ultra, 168 Encore, 65 Encore+

History
- Manufactured: 1989 (V) – 2011 (Encore+)
- Introduction date: 1987 (Citation V), 1994 (Ultra), 1998 (Encore)
- First flight: August 1987
- Developed from: Cessna Citation S/II

The Cessna Citation V (company designation Model 560) is a business jet built by Cessna as part of the Cessna Citation family. The first Model 560 prototype, a stretched version of the Citation S/II, flew in August 1987 and was certified on December 9, 1988. The upgraded Citation Ultra was announced in September 1993; the Citation Encore, upgraded with PW535 turbofans, was announced in 1998 and later upgraded as the Encore+. Between 1989 and 2011, 774 of all variants were produced. Its U.S. military designation is UC-35 as an executive transport and OT-47B as a reconnaissance aircraft.

== Design and development ==
The Citation V (Model 560) is a development of the Citation S/II, retaining the supercritical airfoil and swept wing roots of that aircraft, but with a 1.5 ft (46 cm) fuselage stretch and recontoured interior for increased passenger space. The passenger cabin is 17.3 ft (5.3 m) long, 4.9 by 4.8 ft (149 by 146 cm) wide and high with a dropped aisle, has seven windows on each side and accommodates a four-seat club plus three chairs and a closed, belted lavatory. Maximum seating capacity is eleven, consisting of two pilots, eight passengers in the cabin, and one additional passenger or crew member in the belted lavatory. The engines were changed to more powerful Pratt & Whitney Canada JT15D-5A turbofans with 2,900 lbf (13 kN) of thrust, an overall increase of 800 lbf (3.6 kN) over the S/II that increased cruise speed to 425 kn (489 mph; 787 km/h) and service ceiling to 45,000 ft (14,000 m), although maximum range decreased from 2,090 nmi (2,410 mi; 3,870 km) to 1,960 nmi (2,260 mi; 3,630 km) due to slightly increased fuel consumption. Cessna also replaced the fluid deicing system of the S/II with improved pneumatic deicing boots for decreased weight and easier maintenance, and the horizontal stabilizer span was increased slightly to compensate for the increased engine thrust. The Citation V was also the first Citation with an electronic flight instrument system (EFIS) offered as standard equipment, albeit only on the captain's side.

A preproduction prototype flew in early 1986 and the first engineering prototype made its maiden flight in August 1987. The Citation V was announced at the NBAA convention later that year, Federal Aviation Administration (FAA) certification was granted on December 9, 1988, and 262 were delivered between April 1989 and mid 1994. The Citation V was the best-selling business jet on the market during its production run.

The Citation V was followed in 1994 by the Citation Ultra with slightly more thrust, the Citation Encore in 2001 then the Citation Encore+ in 2007 through early 2010.

=== Citation Ultra ===
The upgraded Citation V Ultra was announced in September 1993 and FAA certification was granted in June 1994. It features extensively redesigned JT15D-5D engines with new compressors, high-pressure turbines, and a one-piece solid machined fan disks, increasing thrust to 3,045 lbf (13.54 kN) while reducing fuel consumption and weight; consequently, the Ultra was the first straight winged Citation with sufficient performance to exceed its critical Mach number in level flight. The captain's side EFIS of the Citation V was upgraded to a full Honeywell Primus 1000 glass cockpit for both pilots. Deliveries amounted to 279.The Ultra was named Flying magazine's "Best Business Jet" of 1994 and it was produced until 1999. Both the Citation V and Ultra hold 5816 pounds of fuel.

By 2018, Citation V/Ultra were priced at $1.1–1.6 million.

=== Citation Encore/Encore+ ===
The Citation Ultra Encore was announced at the 1998 NBAA convention, upgraded with new PW535 engines, plus trailing link main undercarriage, more fuel capacity, updated interior and improved systems. Its maximum cruise altitude is FL 450. Deliveries amounted to 168. The Encore was certified in April 2000 with first delivery in late September 2000.

The upgraded Citation Encore+ was offered from 2007 through early 2010. Deliveries amounted to 65. It was certified by the FAA in December 2006.

The Encore+ adds FADEC and Rockwell Collins Pro Line 21 avionics with a center MFD and both side PFDs. Its weight increased by 200 lb (91 kg) and, typically equipped, it can haul a 850–1,170 lb (390–530 kg) payload with full fuel. It can take off in 3,520 ft (1,070 m) in ISA conditions, has good hot-and-high performance and climbs directly to FL 450 in 27 min. It has a 1,800 nmi (2,100 mi; 3,300 km) range at 390 kn (450 mph; 720 km/h) TAS, the CJ3+ speed but slower than a CJ4. It can fly with one pilot but most are operated with two.

Fuel burn is 1,200 lb (540 kg) for the first hour then 900–1,000 lb (410–450 kg), it costs $1,800–1,900 per hour overall with December 2018 fuel prices and $325,000 for fixed expenses. Light checkups are due every 150 h, basic maintenance at 300 h or 24 months, comprehensive inspections at 1,200 h or 36 months, engine hot section inspections at 2,500 h with 5,000 h overhauls and simple inspections at 10,000 and 12,000 h and at 10,000 and 15,000 landings.

An Encore+ is valued at $3.4–3.8 million in December 2018 and it benefits from Textron Aviation's support.The CJ3 has better fuel efficiency and runway performance but a shorter cabin, the Learjet 45XR cruises faster and hauls more but needs longer runways and burns more fuel, while the CJ4 has better payload/range but is more expensive. The later Model 560 variants are the fastest and farthest flying jets with the type certificate of the original Citation 500.

Softer landing trailing link main landing gear reduced fuel tank capacity to 5,440 pounds, 360 pounds less than the Ultra's, but it has more range. The wheel track was narrowed 3.7 feet for better ground tracking and easier crosswind landing.

The wing leading edge is de-iced by bleed air. Boundary layer energizers and a stall fence improve stall characteristics. Pressurization is digitally controlled and brake modulation is improved. Redesigned interior fittings and passenger seats provide more seated headroom. Passenger service units provide more even airflow and temperature control.

MTOW increases by 330 pounds to 16,630 pounds, to carry five passengers with full fuel, lengthening takeoff from the 3,180 feet needed by the Ultra. The improved PW535 high altitude thrust allow the Encore to climb faster and cruise higher.

=== Military use ===
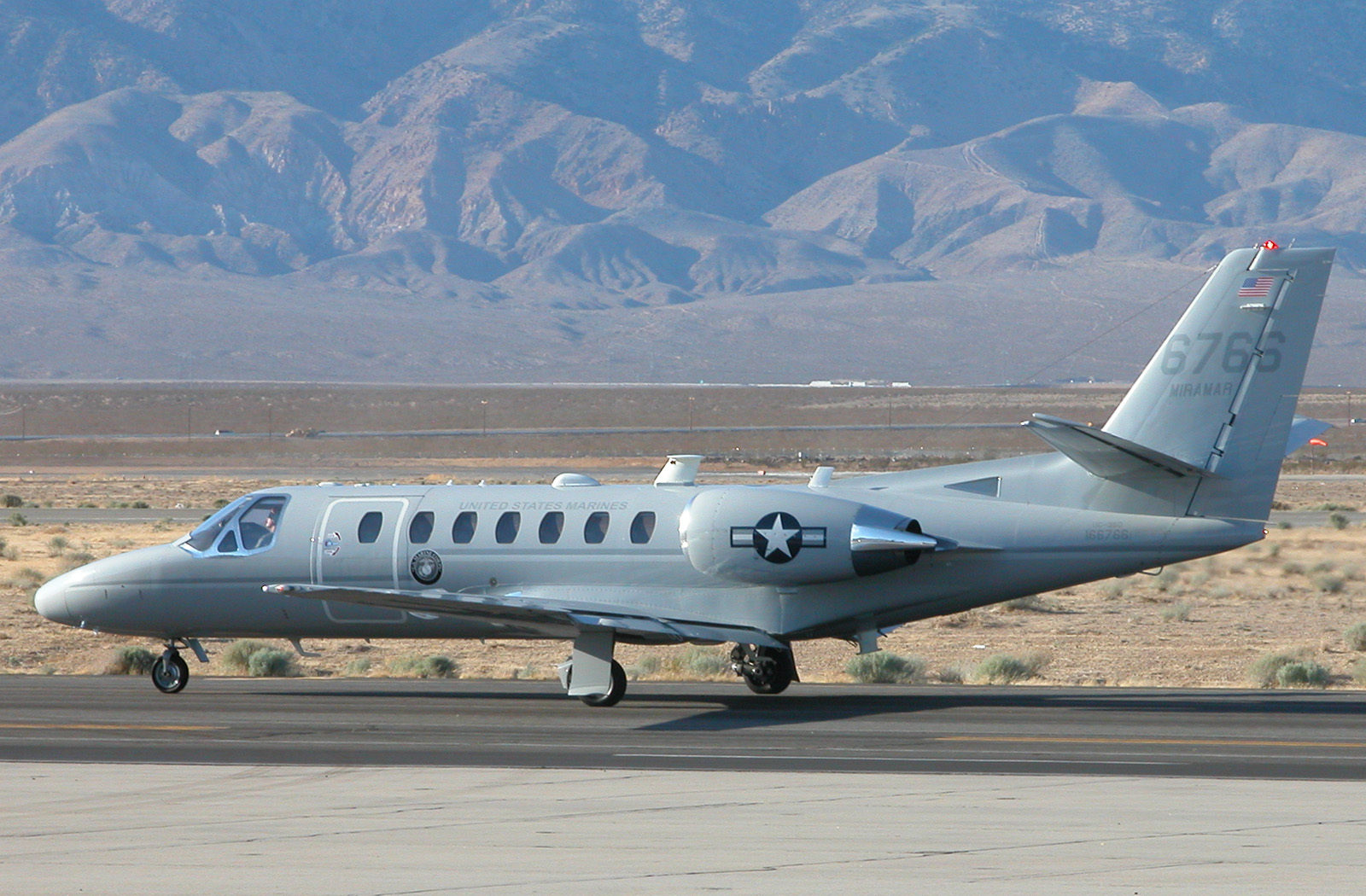
USMC UC-35D at Mojave, California

The UC-35A is the United States Army designation and UC-35C is the United States Marine Corps designation for the Citation Ultra, which replaced older versions of the C-12 Huron. The Marine Corps used the aircraft for high-priority personnel and cargo deliveries. Both of its UC-35C aircraft were retired in May 2021 and placed in storage.

Another version of the Model 560 is the OT-47B (Note: The T-47A designation had previously been used by the U.S. Navy for a radar systems trainer version of the Citation S/II.) Tracker, five of which were purchased by the Department of Defense for use in drug interdiction reconnaissance operations, based at Maxwell Air Force Base. The OT-47B utilizes AN/APG-66 fire control radar and the WF-360TL imaging system. The OT-47Bs have been operated on loan to the Colombian Aerospace Force and Peruvian Navy.

The UC-35B is the Army designation and UC-35D is the Marine Corps designation for the Citation Encore. The final UC-35D was delivered to the Marine Corps in May 2006. The Marine Corps plans to replace its 10 UC-35D aircraft with new UC-12W Huron aircraft by 2030, and began phasing out the UC-35D in 2021.

== Variants ==
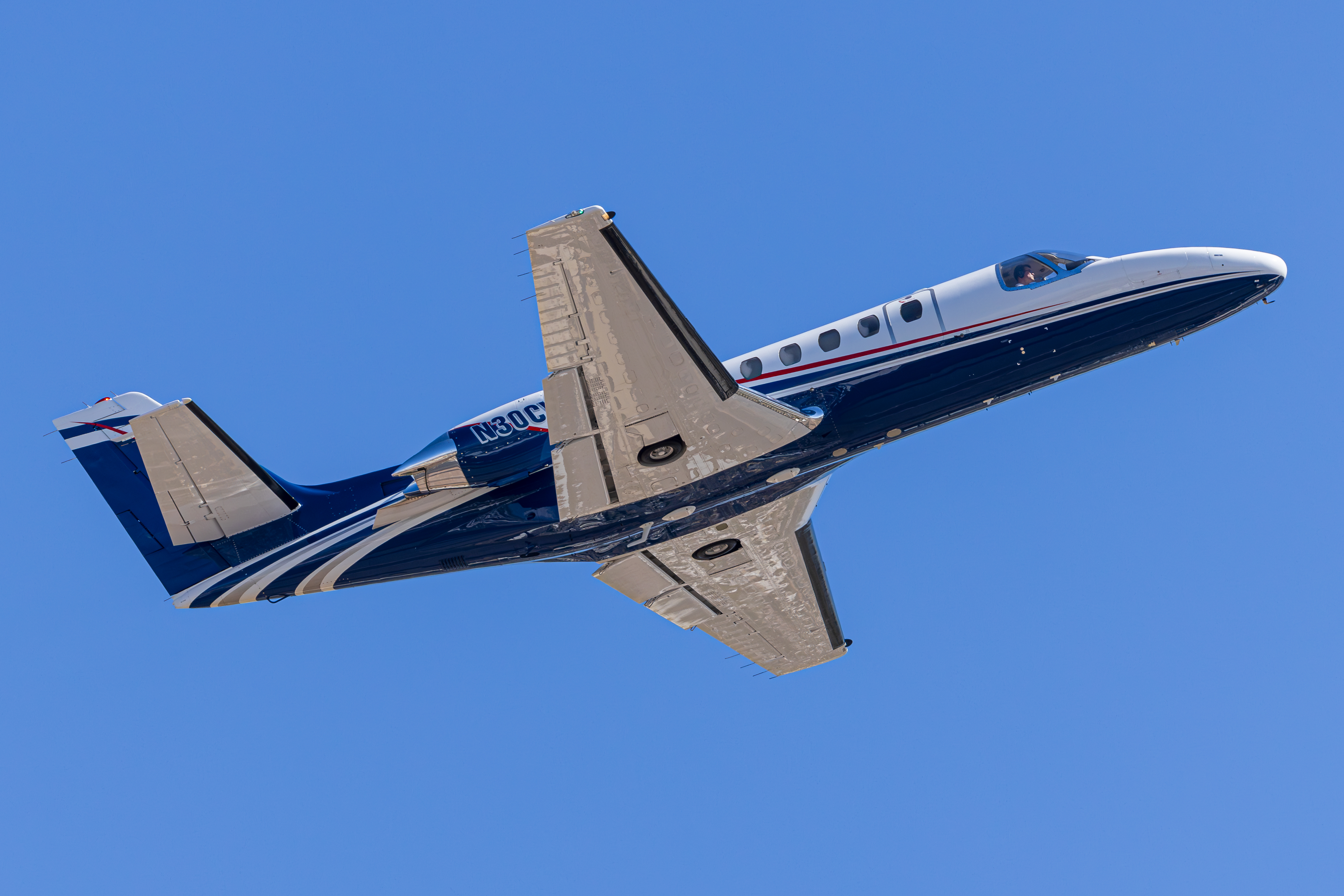
Cessna 560 Citation V N30CV departing Scottsdale Airport, Arizona, October 2023

Model 560 Citation V
Development of Citation S/II certificated on December 9, 1988, with 2,900 lbf (12.9 kN) JT15D-5A engines, 15,900 lb (7.21 t) maximum takeoff weight (MTOW), 861 US gal (717 imp gal; 3,260 L) usable fuel, and EFIS on captain's side only.
Model 560 Citation Ultra
Improved Citation V with 3,045 lbf (13.54 kN) JT15D-5D engines, 16,300 lb (7.39 t) MTOW, and full EFIS instruments.
Model 560 Citation Encore
Improved Citation Ultra certificated on April 26, 2000, with 3,400 lbf (15.1 kN) PW535A engines, 16,630 lb (7.54 t) MTOW, 806 US gal (3,050 L) usable fuel, and improved trailing-link landing gear.
Model 560 Citation Encore+
Improved Encore certificated on December 14, 2006, with PW535B engines, includes FADEC and a redesigned avionics.
UC-35A
U.S. Army and U.S Air Force transport version of the V Ultra.
UC-35B
U.S. Army transport version of the Encore.
UC-35C
U.S. Marine Corps transport version of the V Ultra. Two aircraft.
UC-35D
U.S. Marine Corps transport version of the Encore. Eleven aircraft.
OT-47B Tracker
Five V Ultras purchased by United States Department of Defense in 1995 for drug interdiction reconnaissance, equipped with AN/APG-66 radar and WF-360TL thermal imaging systems.

== Operators ==
=== Civilian operators ===
The aircraft is operated by private individuals, companies, fractionals, charter operators and aircraft management companies.

=== Military operators ===
- Colombia
  - Colombian Aerospace Force
- Pakistan
  - Pakistan Army — 1 × Citation V
- United States
  - United States Army 30 Cessna 560 Citation (UC-35A/B) as of January 2025
  - United States Marine Corps
- Peru
  - Peruvian Army
- Spain
  - Spanish Air and Space Force 3 for aerophotography. Based in Getafe AFB

== Specifications (Cessna Citation Ultra) ==
Data from Business & commercial aviation, Brassey's World Aircraft & Systems Directory 1999–2000

General characteristics

- Crew: 1-2
- Capacity: 7–11 passengers
- Length: 48 ft 11 in (14.9 m)
- Wingspan: 52 ft 2 in (15.9 m)
- Height: 15 ft 0 in (4.6 m)
- Wing area: 342 sq ft (31.8 m^{2})
- Empty weight: 9,925 lb (4,502 kg) BOW
- Max takeoff weight: 16,300 lb (7,394 kg)
- Fuel capacity: 5,771 lb (2,618 kg)
- Max. Payload: 2,275 lb (1,032 kg)
- Cabin length: 17.4 ft (5.3 m)
- Cabin height × width: 4.8 ft × 4.9 ft (1.5 × 1.5 m)
- Powerplant: 2 × Pratt & Whitney Canada JT15D-5D turbofans, 3,045 lbf (13.54 kN) thrust each

Performance

- Maximum speed: Mach 0.755
- Cruise speed: 420–430 kn (480–490 mph, 780–800 km/h)
- Range: 1,960 nmi (2,260 mi, 3,630 km) two pilots and six passengers, no wind
- Service ceiling: 45,000 ft (13,716 m)
- Rate of climb: 4,230 ft/min (21.5 m/s)
- Fuel consumption: 2.4 lb/mi (0.67 kg/km) at FL410, 433 kn (802 km/h)
- Cabin pressurization: 8.9 psi (0.61 bar)

== See also ==
Related development

- Cessna Citation Excel
- Cessna Citation family
- Cessna Citation II
