= Pratt & Whitney Canada JT15D =

Turbofan engine

JT15D
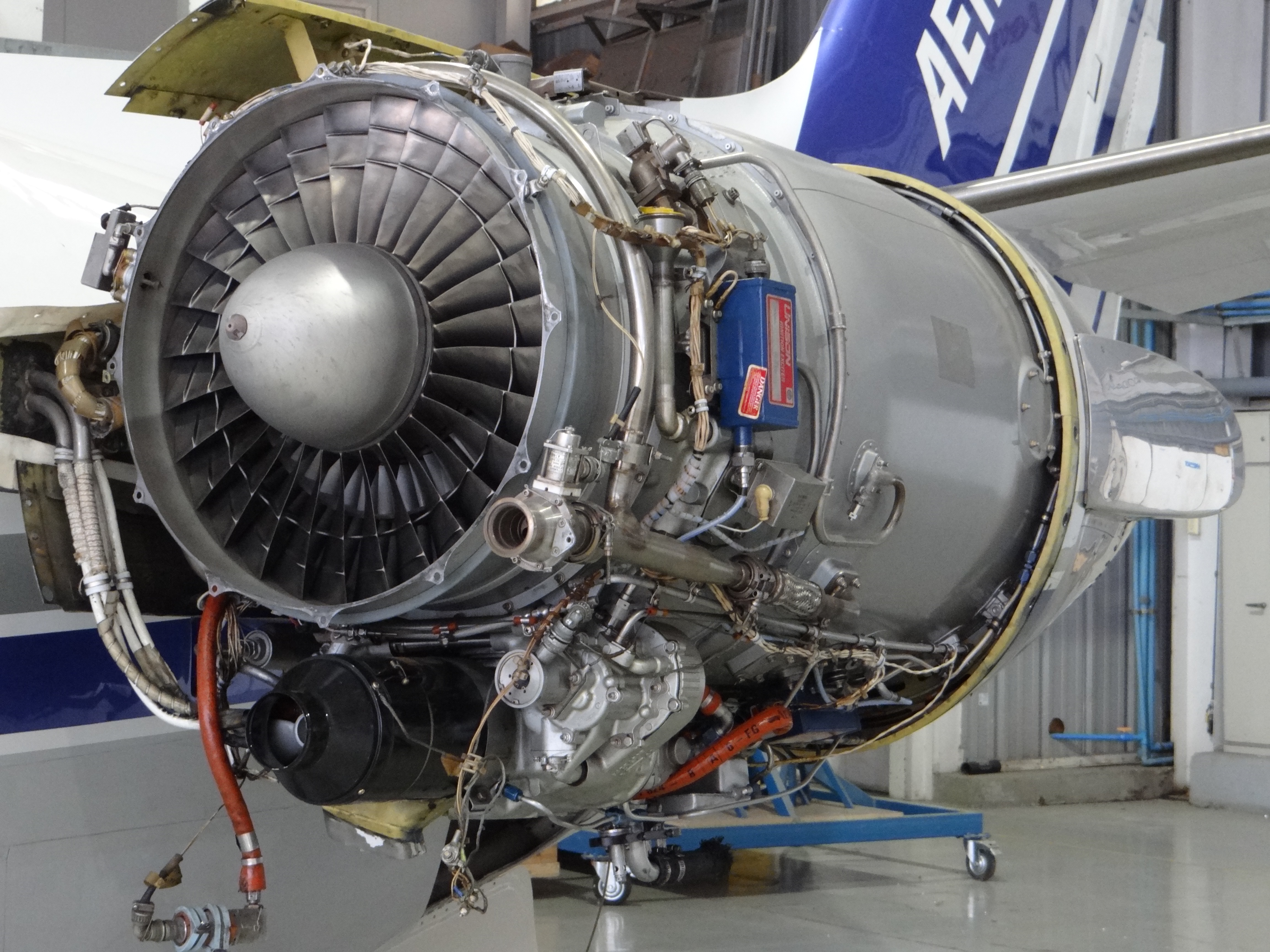
- Aerocardal JT15D
- Type: Turbofan
- National origin: Canada
- Manufacturer: Pratt & Whitney Canada
- First run: 1967
- Major applications: Cessna Citation I Cessna Citation V Hawker 400; SIAI Marchetti S.211
- Number built: >6,000

The Pratt & Whitney Canada JT15D is a small turbofan engine built by Pratt & Whitney Canada. It was introduced in 1971 at 2,200 lbf (9,800 N) thrust, and has since undergone a series of upgrades to just over 3,000 lbf (13 kN) thrust in the latest versions. It is the primary powerplant for a wide variety of smaller jet aircraft, notably business jets.

== Design and development ==
The JT15D was first run in 1967. Its use of a centrifugal compressor as the high-pressure stage in a turbofan engine was followed in 1970 by the Garrett TFE731. The fan for the original JT15D-1 was aerodynamically scaled to 75 lb/sec using the much larger Pratt & Whitney JT9D fan, first used on the Boeing 747.

About 70% of the air passing through the fan goes down the bypass duct. The JT15D-4 and later variants use a "booster" axial stage behind the fan which runs at the same speed as the fan and directs the remaining 30% of the air into the high-pressure compressor, after which it passes into a reverse-flow annular combustor. The hot gases flow through a high-pressure turbine that drives the centrifugal compressor, and a low-pressure turbine that drives the fan and booster.

The engine was first run in August 1967 before being test flown on an Avro Canada CF-100 Canuck in an underslung external test pod. In 1975 a unique over-wing installation in place of Pratt & Whitney Canada PT6 turboprops was fitted to a Beechcraft Super King Air and flown for 93 hours to investigate the use of turbofan engines on that airframe.

== Variants ==
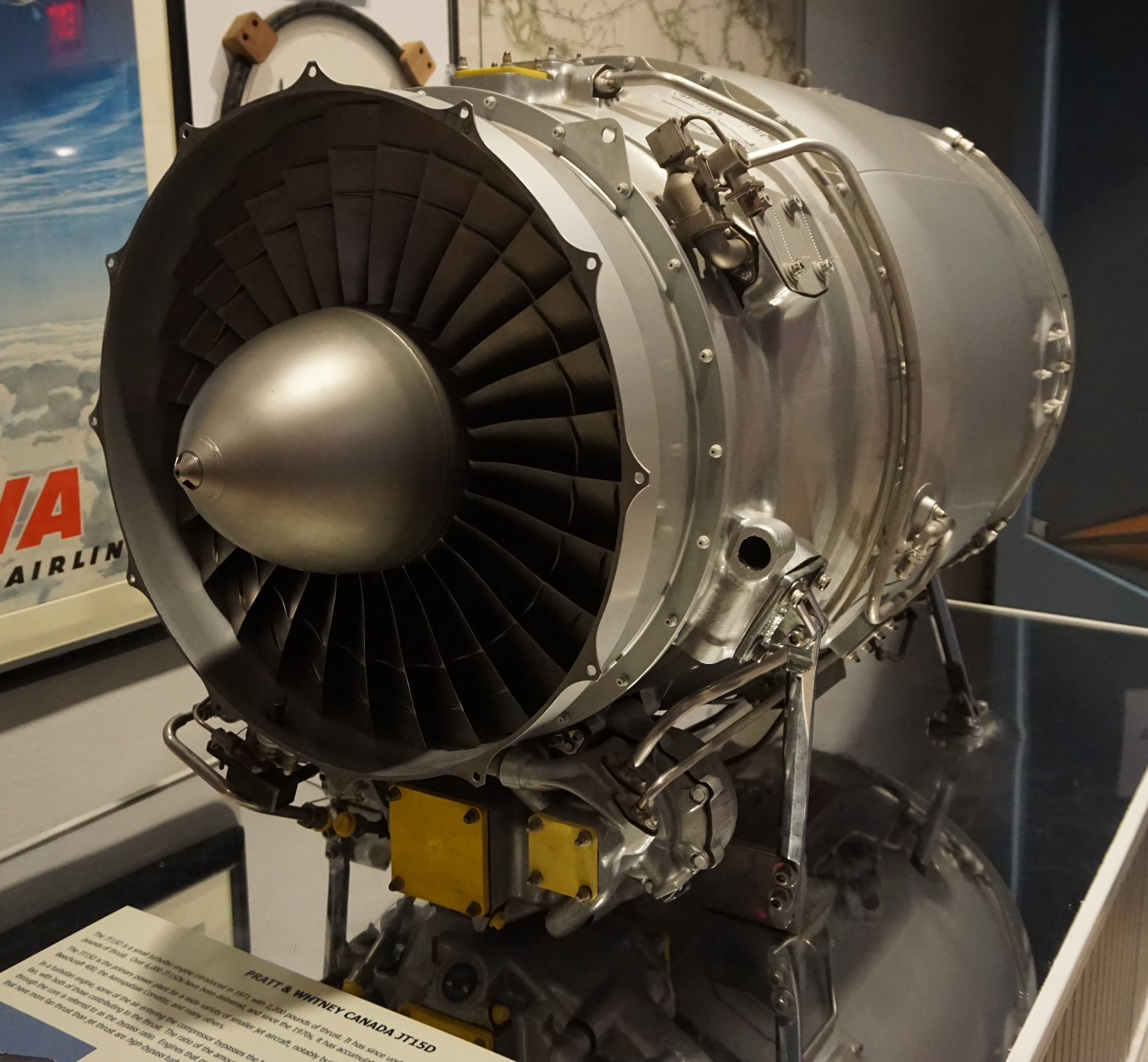
A JT15D at the Frontiers of Flight Museum

JT15D-1
The first model was introduced to power the Cessna Citation I, then known as the Fanjet 500. Deliveries started in 1972, and eventually on 1,417 -1s were delivered.
JT15D-1A
JT15D-1B
JT15D-4
Introduced in 1973, improving thrust to 2,500 lbf (11,000 N). The -4 was the primary engine for the Cessna Citation II, and went on to find use on the Mitsubishi Diamond 1A, Aerospatiale Corvette and SIAI-Marchetti S.211. Eventually 2,195 engines of the -4 series were delivered.
JT15D-4A
JT15D-4B
JT15D-4C
JT15D-4D
JT15D-5
Certified in 1983. The first versions delivered 2,900 lbf (13,000 N) and were used on the Beechjet 400A and Cessna T-47A. Several minor versions were introduced, the -5A for the Cessna Citation V, while the -5B powered the Beechcraft T-1A Jayhawk, the -5C the DASA Ranger 2000 and S-211A.
JT15D-5A
JT15D-5B
JT15D-5C
JT15D-5D
Certified in 1993, increased thrust again, this time to 3,045 lbf (13,540 N). The -5D is used on the Cessna UC-35A and Cessna Citation Ultra.
JT15D-5F

== Applications ==
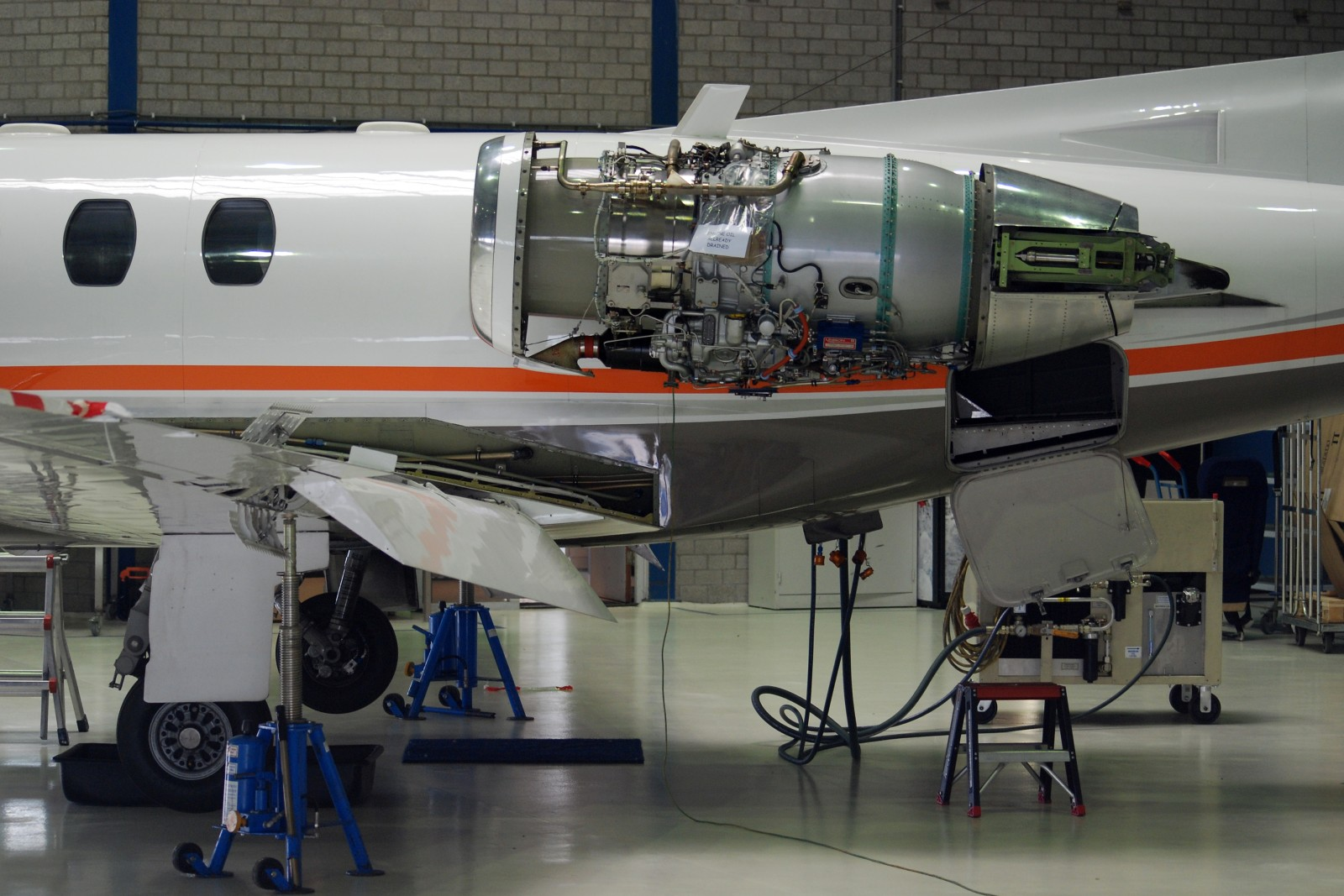
Cessna Citation installation

- Aérospatiale Corvette
- Alenia Aermacchi M-311
- Ball-Bartoe Jetwing
- Boeing Bird of Prey
- Beechcraft Beechjet 400
- Cessna Citation I
- Cessna Citation II
- Cessna Citation V/Ultra
- EADS Barracuda
- Hawker 400
- Honda MH02
- Mitsubishi MU-300 Diamond
- Northrop Grumman X-47A Pegasus
- Raytheon T-1 Jayhawk
- Rockwell Ranger 2000
- Scaled Composites 401
- Scaled Composites ARES
- SIAI-Marchetti S.211/Aermacchi S-211
- Sport Jet II
- Stratos 716X

== Specifications (JT15D-5D) ==
==== General characteristics ====
- Type: Turbofan
- Length: 60.3 in (1,530 mm)
- Diameter: 27 in (690 mm)
- Dry weight: 630 lb (290 kg)

==== Components ====
- Compressor: Axial flow LP, centrifugal flow HP
- Fuel type: Jet A/A1

==== Performance ====
- Maximum thrust: 3,050 lbf (1,380 kgf; 13.6 kN)
- Specific fuel consumption: 0.562 lb/(lbf⋅h) (15.9 g/(kN⋅s)) at maximum thrust; 0.552 lb/(lbf⋅h) (15.6 g/(kN⋅s)) at cruise (typical)
- Thrust-to-weight ratio: ≈ 4.58

Engine	Takeoff thrust (kN)	Continuous thrust (kN)	Length (mm)	Fan Diameter(mm)	Diameter.(mm)	Dry weight (kg)	Bypass ratio
JT15D-1	9.8	9.3	1506		691	223.5	3.3
JT15D-4	11.12	10.56	1600		686	253	2.6
JT15D-4C	11.12	10.56	1600		686	261	2.6
JT15D-5	12.92		1600			287	2
JT15D-5A	12.92		1600			287	2
JT15D-5B	12.92		1600			292	2
JT15D-5C	14.21		1600			302	2
JT15D-5D	13.56		1531	520	686	292.6	3.3
JT15D-5F	12.92		1600			288	2
