= Fuel reserve =

Extra fuel for when main fuel tank is low or empty

In motorcycles and cars, the fuel reserve setting indicates that the level of fuel in the tank is low. In cars and most modern motorcycles this quantity (the reserve) is automatically available. Older motorcycles have a manual fuel tap or petcock. When the main fuel is exhausted, the motor will start sputtering, prompting the rider to change the position knob to continue riding with a known smaller quantity of fuel. Generally, when a rider notices that the engine began sputtering, he or she will have enough time to turn the petcock and access the reserve fuel before the engine shuts down.

Most petcocks have three positions:

- OFF - This position is important to keep the tank from leaking when the engine is off. Whether it is present or not depends on the type of carburetor that is used.
- MAIN - This is the normal setting when the engine is running. Sometimes this position is labeled "ON" or "RUN".
- RESERVE - In this position, a known but small volume of fuel is available to allow the rider to be able to reach a petrol station. The reserve is always a small quantity of the total supply.

In most cases, the main and the reserve settings are actually drawing from the same tank, but there are two outlets through which the fuel may leave. One outlet is located a short distance above the other, when the fuel selector is set to the 'main' position, the fuel will flow from the upper outlet, and will stop flowing when the fuel level gets below the outlet. When the selector is on 'reserve', the lower outlet will be used, which allows all or most of the fuel to be drawn from the tank.

Because in most cases the 'reserve' setting simply allows access to all the fuel, rather than a dedicated tank, the 'reserve' selection allows the rider to deplete the main fuel supply as well as the reserve. In theory this causes no harm, except that the fuel may run out without warning.

Because fuel tanks accumulate various substances that can cause problems if these are allowed to flow downstream in the fuel system, it is advisable to refill the tank before or soon after the level reaches the reserve outlet and not drain the tank completely. At the bottom of the tank, especially from old cars and motorcycles and those with metal tanks, there is always a small amount of water (from moisture in the air, or from rain) mixed with various solid materials, like sand (blown in during a gas stop) or rust (from the inside of the metal tank). These substances can block the fuel line or the tiny holes in the carburetor venturi or fuel injection system when allowed to flow down-stream towards the carburetors or fuel injection units and beyond. Too much water mixed in with the fuel can also hinder combustion or damage the combustion chamber due to the fact that water isn't combustible and cannot be compressed like the normal gaseous fuel-air mixture can.

== In Aircraft ==
The fuel on an aircraft usually includes the computed fuel to destination, plus fuel for the designated alternate airport plus 45 minutes fuel for anything unexpected. The reserve can also be used for in-flight diversions or emergencies. An adequate reserve can sometimes be treated as an unnecessary luxury in military aviation, but civil authorities consider adequate reserves to be a vital necessity in air transport operations.
