= Pratt & Whitney Canada PW500 =

Turbofan engines in Canada

PW500
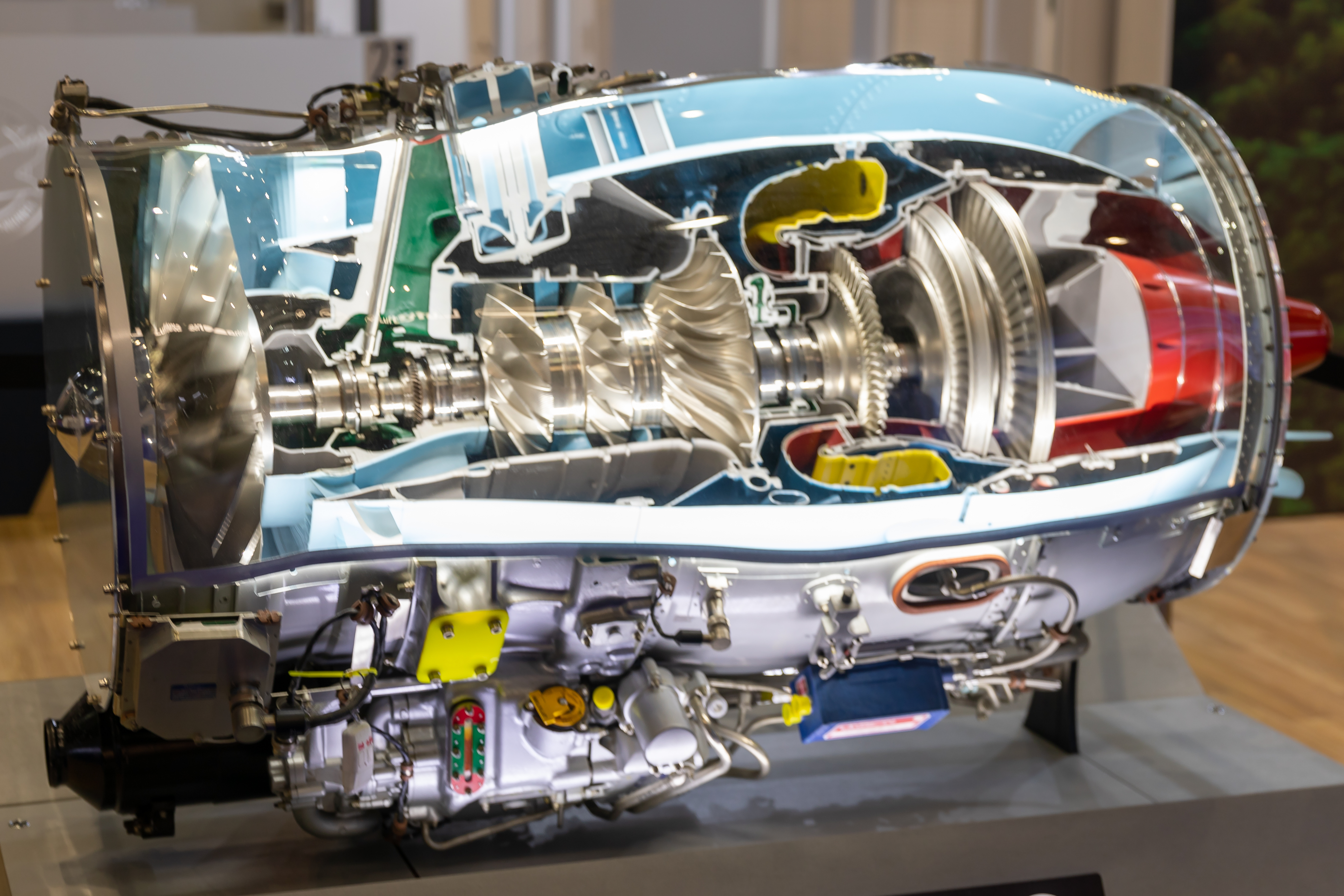
- Cutaway showing the configuration : 1 fan, 2A+1C HP compressor, 1 HP and 2 LP turbine
- Type: Turbofan
- National origin: Canada
- Manufacturer: Pratt & Whitney Canada
- First run: November 1993
- Major applications: Cessna Citation II Bravo; Cessna Citation V Encore; Cessna 560XL; Embraer Phenom 300; MQ-20 Avenger
- Number built: 4,600 (May 2023)

The Pratt & Whitney Canada PW500 is a series of medium thrust turbofan engines designed specifically for business jet applications.

== Design ==
The PW530 has a single stage fan, driven by a 2-stage LP turbine, supercharging a 2A/1CF axial-centrifugal HP compressor, driven by a single stage HP turbine. Although similar in configuration, the PW535 has a booster stage, mounted on the LP shaft behind the fan, to increase overall pressure ratio and core flow. Similar to the PW535, the PW545 has an additional LP turbine stage to drive a larger diameter fan.

== Development ==
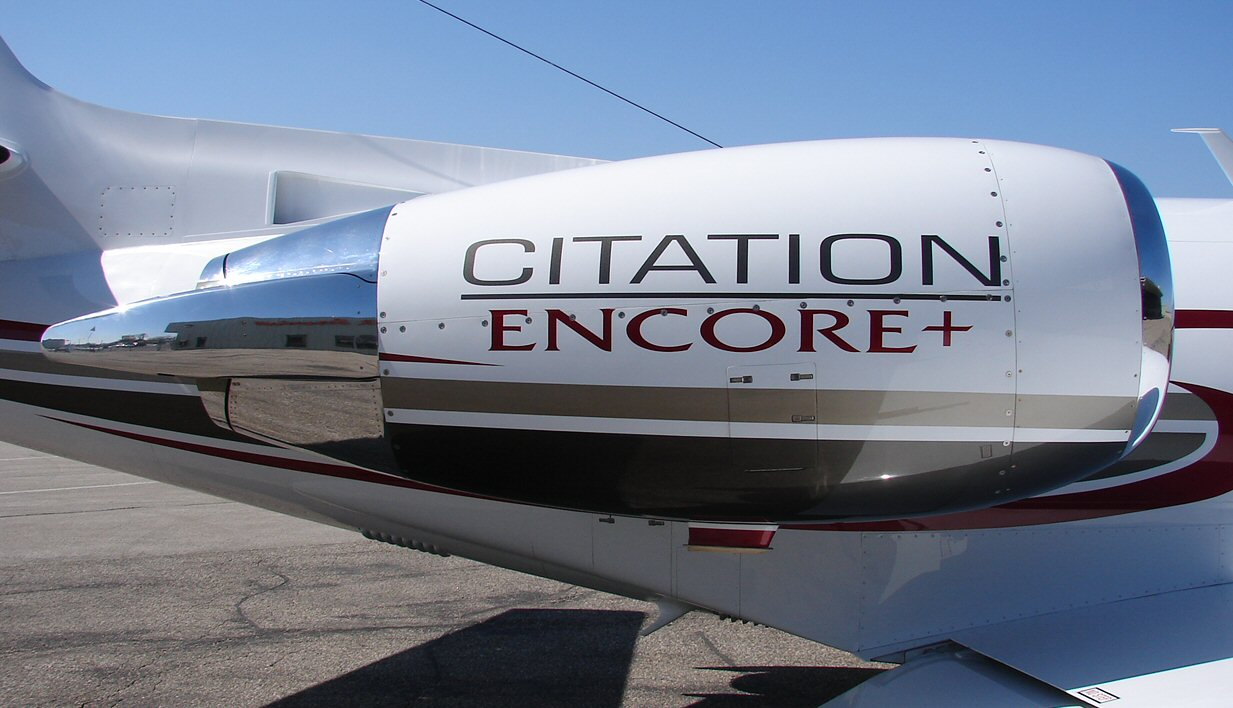
PW535B on a Cessna Citation V Encore+

The PW530A, rated at 2,887 lbf (12.84 kN), entered service in February 1997 on the Cessna Citation II Bravo, and the PW545 in July 1998 on the Cessna Citation Excel. The PW535 powered the Cessna Citation V Encore in September 2000, and was selected for the Embraer Phenom 300, first delivered in December 2009.

On 31 January 2020, Embraer announced improvements to its Phenom 300, including increased speeds and upgraded engines. The engines, designated PW535E1, are rated at 3,478 lbf (15.47 kN)/

Unveiled at the May 2023 EBACE show, the FADEC-controlled PW545D is developed for the Cessna 560XL Ascend variant, to be rated at 4,200 lbf (19 kN) and optimized for improved fuel burn and longer time between overhauls (TBO) up to 6,000 hours. By then, 4,600 PW500s had been produced and had flown 22 million hours.

== Applications ==
Application	Variant
Cessna Citation II Bravo	PW530A
Cessna Citation V Encore	PW535A
Cessna Citation V Encore+	PW535B
Cessna 560XL Excel	PW545A
Cessna 560XL XLS	PW545B
Cessna 560XL XLS+	PW545C
Cessna 560XL Ascend	PW545D
Embraer Phenom 300	PW535E
General Atomics MQ-20 Avenger	PW545B
Scaled Composites 437 Vanguard	PW535A
Northrop Grumman YFQ-48A Talon Blue	Unknown PW500 Variant

== Specifications ==
	PW530	PW535A	PW545A	PW545B	PW545C
Thrust (lb/kN)	2,887/12.84	3,400/15.12	3,804/16.92	3,952/17.58	4,119/18.32
TSFC (lb/lbf/h)	0.44		0.44		
Bypass ratio	~3.7	2.55	4.10	3.8	4.12
Overall pressure ratio	~13.3	13.3		11.7	12.5
Overall Length (in)	60.0	63.9	68.6		
Fan Diameter (in)	23.0	28.2	27.3		
Application	Citation; Bravo	Citation; Encore	Citation; Excel	Citation; XLS	Citation; XLS+

== See also ==
Comparable engines

- Garrett TFE731
- Williams FJ44

Related lists

- List of aircraft engines
