= Cessna 526 CitationJet =

American prototype jet training aircraft

526 CitationJet
- Both 526 prototypes in flight

General information
- Type: Primary jet trainer
- National origin: United States
- Manufacturer: Cessna
- Status: Canceled
- Number built: 2

History
- First flight: 20 December 1993
- Developed from: Cessna CitationJet

The Cessna 526 CitationJet is a twinjet trainer built by Cessna as a candidate for the United States Joint Primary Aircraft Training System. It was a twin-engined, tandem seat aircraft, based on the Cessna CitationJet executive aircraft. However, it was unsuccessful, with only two prototypes built.

== Design and development ==
The United States military issued a request for proposal for a trainer to be used by the United States Air Force and United States Navy. Cessna responded with the 526, based on its 525 CitationJet civilian business jet. The 526 and 525 shared 75% commonality including the wings, engines and landing gear. The electrical- hydraulic- and fuel systems were also common to the two types. The 526 had a redesigned fuselage featuring a tandem two-seat cockpit with zero-zero ejection seats; and a new empennage with a low-mounted tailplane instead of the 525's T-tail.

The prototype first flew on 20 December 1993 and was followed by a second prototype with its first flight on 2 March 1994.

The CitationJet did not succeed in the competition, which was won by the turboprop Beechcraft T-6 Texan II, a variant of the Pilatus PC-9.

== Specifications ==
Data from

General characteristics

- Crew: 2
- Length: 40 ft 8 in (12.40 m)
- Wingspan: 37 ft 0 in (11.28 m)
- Height: 12 ft 6 in (3.81 m)
- Wing area: 218 sq ft (20.6 m^{2}) est.
- Empty weight: 6,450 lb (2,925 kg)
- Gross weight: 8,500 lb (3,855 kg)
- Powerplant: 2 × Williams-Rolls F129 turbofan, 1,500 lbf (6.7 kN) thrust each

Performance

- Maximum speed: 311 mph (500 km/h, 270 kn)
- Maximum speed: Mach 0.70
- Range: 1,209 mi (1,944 km, 1,051 nmi)
- Service ceiling: 35,000 ft (10,668 m) certified

== See also ==
- Textron Scorpion

Aircraft of comparable role, configuration, and era

- Pilatus PC-9
- Rockwell Ranger 2000

== Notes ==
=== Bibliography ===
- "Cessna, Williams, FlightSafety team enters JPATS competition". Defence Daily. Vol. 177, no. 38. 25 November 1992.
- "Cessna all-out to complete JPATS". Flight International. 23–29 June 1993. p. 40.
- "Cessna notches up first-flight double". Flight International. 5–11 January 1994. p. 5.
- "Joined Forces". Flight International. 29 June – 5 July 1994. pp. 26–28.
- "JPATS flight tests to start in July". Flight International.
- Taylor, Michael J. H. (1996). Brassey's World Aircraft & Systems Directory. London, England: Brassey's. ISBN 1-85753-198-1.
