= CJ3 =

CJ3 may refer to:

- Jeep CJ-3 land vehicle
- Cessna CitationJet CJ3 aircraft
