= CJ4 =

CJ4 may refer to:

- Cessna CitationJet CJ4 aircraft
- Jeep CJ-4 automobile
- CJ-4, a category of motor oil
