= JPATS =

JPATS may refer to:

- Joint Primary Aircraft Training System
- Justice Prisoner Air Transportation System
