= CJ2 =

CJ2 may refer to:

- Jeep CJ-2 land vehicle
- Cessna CitationJet CJ2 aircraft
- China Railways CJ-2 an intercity high-speed train operate in China
