= Air Support to Defence Operational Training =

General information
- Issued by: UK Ministry of Defence
- Service: British Army; Royal Air Force; Royal Navy; Joint Forces Command
- Requirement: Procurement of military air training support services

History
- Initiated: June 2016
- Outcome: Cancelled (March 2019)
- Successors: Medium-to-Fast Speed Operational Readiness Training aerial support service

The Air Support to Defence Operational Training (ASDOT), was a proposed programme whereby training in defence for aircrew in the armed forces of the United Kingdom would be provided by a civilian contractor. It was to include all air training undertaken under the umbrella of the Ministry of Defence (MOD); Royal Air Force (RAF), Fleet Air Arm (FAA), the Army Air Corps (AAC) and any units which came under the aegis of Joint Forces Command. The project was originally scheduled to go live in 2020, with training being folded into the programme when existing measures and contracts expired. The project was cancelled in March 2019 and re-launched in October 2021.

== Background ==
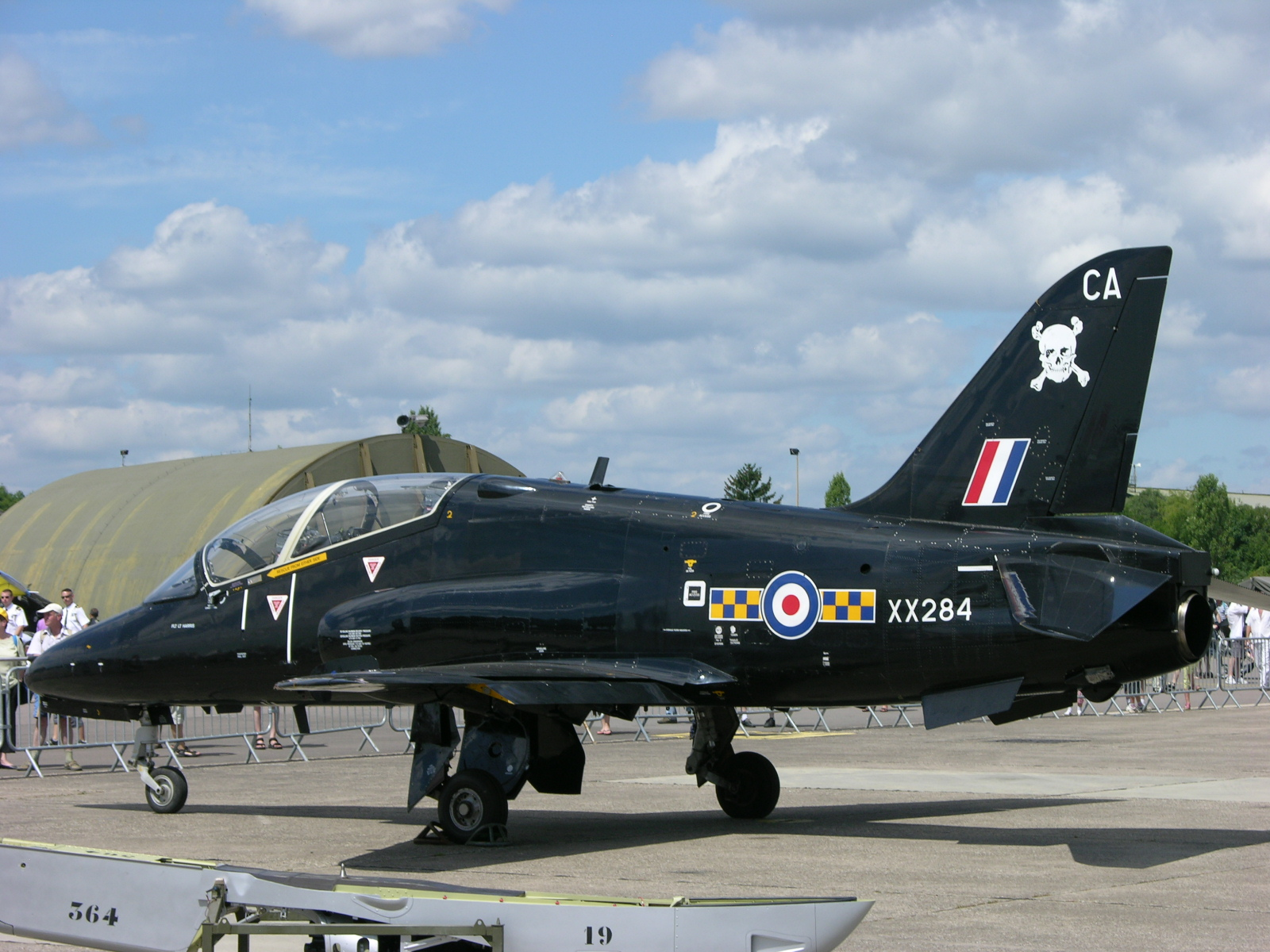
The ASDOT programme proposed to replace the Royal Air Force's Hawk T1A aircraft which are operated by No. 100 Squadron in the aggressor role

The Fleet Air Arm Hawk T1 of 736 Naval Air Squadron were due to be phased out in 2020 and the ASDOT programme would then have assumed training for the Royal Navy. Additionally it was proposed that the Hawk T1 aircraft operated by the RAF's No. 100 squadron would be retired from their aggressor role in 2027, with the capability provided by the ASDOT programme.

Cobham Aviation Services supply fifteen Falcon 20 aircraft to use in the aggressor and electronic warfare role for the RAF and the Royal Navy. These aircraft are based at Bournemouth Airport and Durham Tees Valley Airport. It was expected that these aircraft would be replaced by a newer (or more capable) platform.

== History ==
In June 2016, the Ministry of Defence (MOD) announced the contract detailing the requirements of the future training programme, which was still under review. The purpose was to combine the different training and support packages into one programme as they expired or ran their natural course. As the programme was still in its initial stages, the final details were still undecided until the contract was awarded, but it was proposed to include:

- Air-to-air combat training
- Air-to-surface training
- Joint terminal attack controller and forward air controller training
- Electronic warfare
- Air Traffic Control
- Aerospace Battle Management
- Ground Based Air Defence
- Live Gunnery

The initial contract was for a £700 million ($917 million) (Note: These were the initial specified values of the programme. Inflation and exchange rate fluctuations affected the eventual package. Others sources state the amount to be £1.5 billion over a fifteen-year period.) package to "cover the provision of live flying assets and technical capabilities to produce effects in support of training and assurance requirements". The contract, which was expected to start in 2020, was for ten years (though a fifteen-year contract with an additional £300 million–£500 million) was possible from the outset. Baseline training time was expected to be between 5,000 and 6,000 hours per year, but it was not stated whether this was in total or just the aerial phases.

Instructional training on the Typhoon aircraft has utilised civilian personnel before and the advantage of devolving training to private companies is that the MoD only pays for the hours that it uses the service, rather than having their own people on the payroll permanently. Additionally, a spokesperson confirmed that it was also a way of keeping the people who fly the fast-jets in the workstream when they come to leave the services.

These guys are as good as they come but are being drawn away by airlines once they get some experience, this [programme] keeps continuity in training and ensures pilots are learning from the best.

Both the Canadian Air Force and the United States Air Force have civilian companies who provide an aggressor role capability (also known as red-air) for their training requirements.

The successful bidder for the contract would have been expected to provide the aggressor capability through its own aircraft. Typically involving some slower airspeed aircraft, but would have also needed fourth generation aircraft that were commensurate with the F-35B Lightning.

The desire was that any aggressor role aircraft should not be something in the current RAF Fleet (such as the Hawk T1) so that pilots "find themselves facing off with aircraft not in the British arsenal, whose capabilities they are unfamiliar with".

The contract was initially estimated to have been awarded in early January 2019, but by 24 January, the bids were still being scrutinised. In March 2019, the MOD announced that they had cancelled the £1.2 billion project. It was unclear whether the project was cancelled completely, or if it would be re-tendered at some point in the future as has indeed now happened.

== Contenders ==
An Invitation to Negotiation (ITN) was issued in September 2018, with four multinational companies expressing interest in the contract:

- Babcock Aerospace
- Cobham Aviation Services
- Leonardo
- Thales UK

Each company partnered with at least one other third party in order to deliver the aims of the contract and derive experience and talent from previous associations with military skills. Babcock teamed up with Elbit Systems Limited, whilst Cobham entered into a partnership with Draken International, 3SDL and QinetiQ.

Leonardo teamed up with Top Aces and Inzpire; Top Aces are already contracted to the Canadian government in their Contracted Airborne Training Services (CATS) programme.

Thales announced a deal with QinetiQ in 2016, which would see the Scorpion aircraft deployed on the contract. However in 2018, QinetiQ signed a deal with Cobham. Similarly, Draken International had an understanding with Babcock, but later switched to the Cobham deal too.

== Successor programmes ==
In October 2021, the MOD indicated it was seeking procurement of an adversary air support service from the private sector. Known as the Medium to Fast Speed Operational Readiness Training (ORT) Aerial Support Service, it would include air-to-air, target, threat simulation and mission augmentation training. The programme is an urgent requirement for the RAF, with an operational start required by summer 2022.

On 28th March 2022, the RAF announced that a six-year contract to provide these services, now known as the Interim Red Air Aggressor Training Service (IRAATS) was awarded to Draken Europe using a fleet of Aero L-159 ALCA Honey Badgers and Dassault Falcon 20s.
