= RFB Fantrainer =

Training aircraft in Germany

Fantrainer
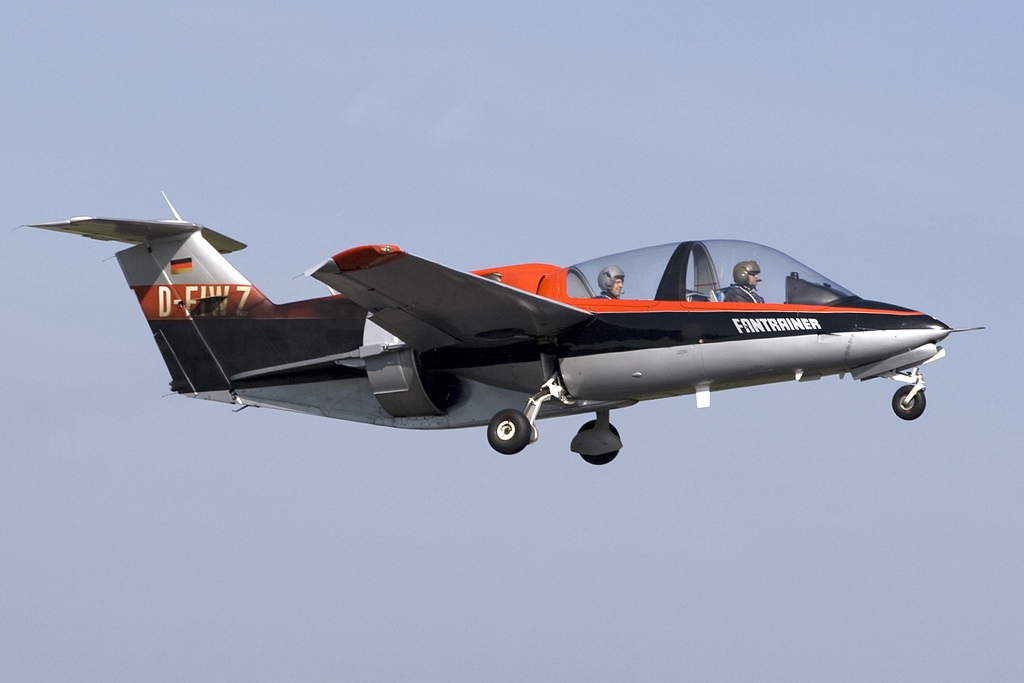
- RFB Fantrainer 600

General information
- Type: Basic trainer
- Manufacturer: Rhein-Flugzeugbau
- Number built: 50

History
- Introduction date: 1982
- First flight: 27 October 1977
- Developed into: Rockwell Ranger 2000

The RFB Fantrainer (or Fan Trainer) is a two-seat flight training aircraft which uses a mid-mounted ducted fan propulsion system. Developed and manufactured by German aircraft company Rhein-Flugzeugbau GmbH (RFB), it has been used by the Royal Thai Air Force.

Development of the Fantrainer commenced during the 1970s. In Germany, it was selected as the winner of a competition for the Luftwaffe's Basic Trainer Requirement, having beaten both the Pilatus PC-7 and Beechcraft Mentor. However, no orders were forthcoming from Germany as it had committed to buying American fighters (F4 Phantom and F-104 Starfighter) which included a deal for pilot training in the United States. At one point, German flag carrier Lufthansa also reportedly took an interest in the aircraft, noting its jet-like handling. Pilots have confirmed the type to be relatively fuel-efficient and capable of providing a true "jet feel" for a reasonable price. The Royal Thai Air Force operates the FT400 and FT600 versions, using it to train ab initio pilots who then went on to fly the Northrop F-5E fighter aircraft.

== Development ==
=== Origins ===
In the 1960s the German company Rhein Flugzeugbau developed an interest in aircraft powered by ducted fans integrated into the fuselage, flying a pair of modified gliders as flying testbeds in 1969 and 1971. During 1970, the company announced that it had embarked upon a new project to develop a two-seat ducted-fan military trainer, intending to offer an aircraft that possessed jet-like handling at a low cost. In March 1975, RFB received a contract from the German Defence Ministry to produce and fly a pair of prototype Fantrainers; these would be evaluated as replacements for Luftwaffe's existing fleet of Piaggio P.149 initial trainers. According to aerospace periodical Flight International, the initial production process only took seven months to complete a single prototype.

On 27 October 1977, the first prototype (registration D-EATJ), powered by a pair of EA871 110 kW (150 hp) NSU Wankel engines, made its maiden flight. The EA871 engine installation proved to be troublesome, thus the second prototype (D-EATI) was furnished with a single 310 kW (420 shp) Allison 250-C20B turboshaft engine, making its first flight on 31 May 1978. The second prototype crashed on 7 September 1978, which resulted in the first prototype being modified to Fantrainer 400 standard, being furnished with an Allison engine and revised air intakes. The Fantrainer was evaluated by the Luftwaffe against the Beechcraft T-34C and Pilatus PC-7 turboprop powered trainers, but although it was considered to be the most suitable of the three aircraft, being cheaper both to purchase (at DM 1 million per aircraft) and to operate, no orders resulted as it was decided that the Piaggio P.149 was still adequate for the Luftwaffe's needs.

Despite failing to secure an order from the Luftwaffe, during May 1982, RFB announced that it was set to commence mass production of the Fantrainer within the next few months. By this point, the prototype had accumulated 500 flight hours, which included a five week-long marketing tour around America, have flown an average of 6.5 hours per day during this sojourn. While the company had forecast a wider market for trainer aircraft of roughly 5,000 aircraft over the following decade, it stated that it was aiming for an initial market share of 4 per cent (equivalent to 200 aircraft) due to the unorthodox nature of the Fantrainer. During 1983, the prototype was refitted, its seven-bladed ducted fan being replaced with a five-bladed standard production counterpart, while the cockpit was also improved; the changes reportedly enabled a significant noise reduction and superior external visibility.

=== Production ===
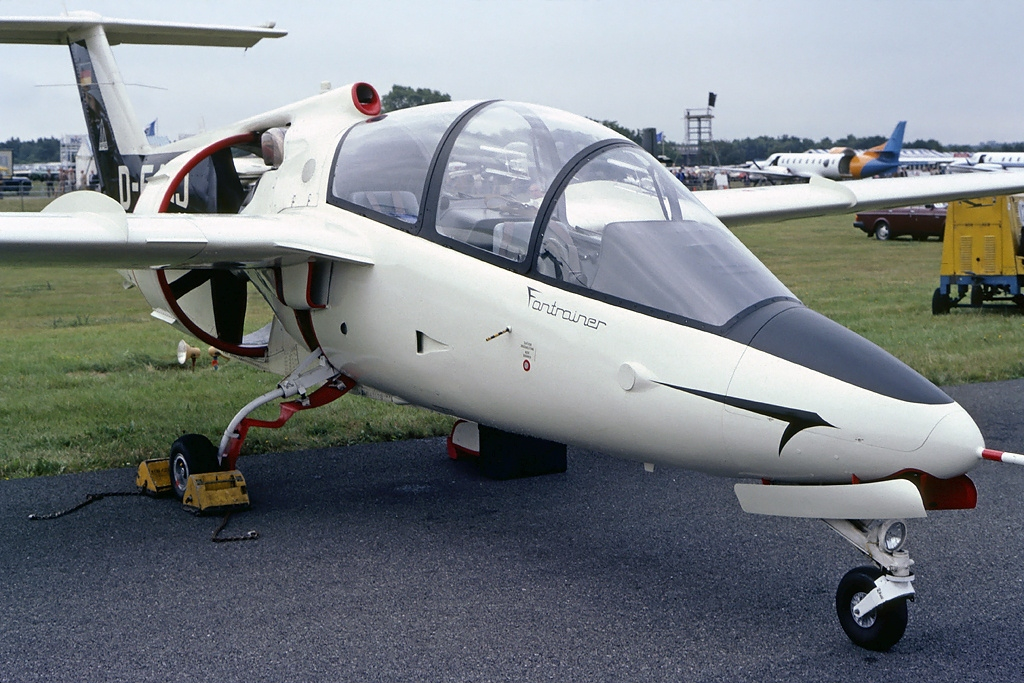
RFB Fantrainer 400

The aircraft has been produced in two principal models, these being the Fantrainer 400, powered by a 545 shp (406 kW) Allison 250-C20B, and the Fantrainer 600, which was powered by a 650 shp (480 kW) Allison 250-C30. According to aerospace publication Flight International, the market had a more favourable reaction to the Fantrainer 600 during the 1980s.

In August 1982, the Royal Thai Air Force signed a contract with RFB to purchase 47 aircraft, 31 of the model 400 and 16 of the 600. Upon introduction, they were assigned to the 402 Squadron and used as a step-up trainer for their future F-5 Freedom Fighter pilots. The step-up characteristic of the Fantrainer is generally one of its main advantages; the abilities of the Fantrainer in a training capacity is such to almost fully cover a pilot's entire syllabus, only needing to be supplemented by an Advanced Trainer for the purpose of building direct experience with high performance jets. The first four aircraft were constructed in Germany while the remaining aircraft were assembled in Thailand from kits shipped from RFB, which were assembled at a peak rate of six Fantrainers per month. After an initial period of operation, the RTAF elected to replace the aircraft's glass fiber wings with locally-produced aluminium wings, even when the original fiber glass wings proved to endure well in the hot and humid Thailand weather, which was a main concern of the manufacturer.

During the 21st century, FanJet Aviation GmbH set about reviving production of the Fantrainer 600, aiming to re-introduce the type under the new name Fanjet 600. During 2010, the company purchased all documentation related to the design, testing and type certification of the original aircraft, followed by the acquisition of associated tools, spare parts inventory, and the trademarks for Rhein-Flugzeugbau and Vereinigte Flugtechnische Werke. FanJet Aviation believes that, following the adoption of a glass cockpit to modernise it, the aircraft remains both valid and cost-competitive for current-day pilot training purposes compared to contemporary jet-powered competitors.

== Design ==
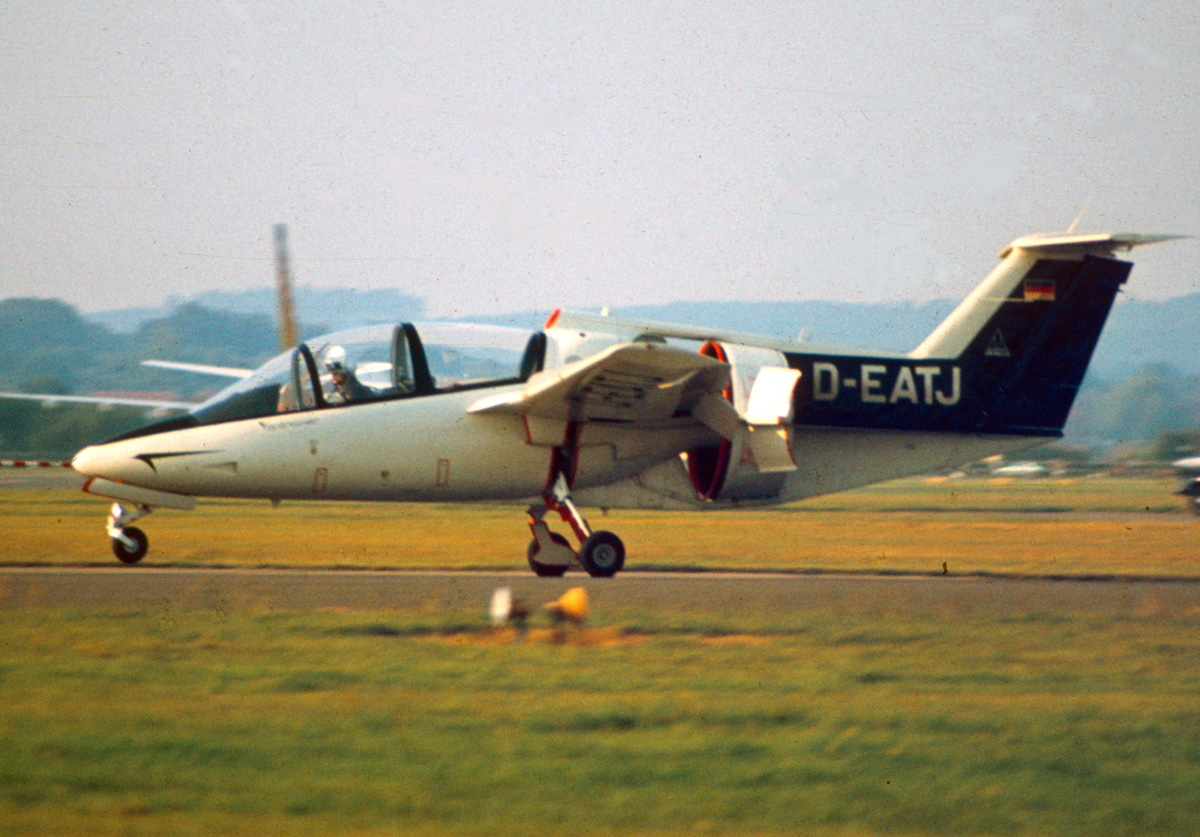
Fantrainer taxiing, September 1982

The RFB Fantrainer is a twin-seat trainer aircraft; its most distinctive feature is its propulsion system, a mid-mounted ducted fan. This reportedly delivers performance akin to aircraft harnessing conventional jet propulsion, but at significantly reduced costs; on average, the Fantrainer has one-tenth of the fuel consumption of the Dassault/Dornier Alpha Jet, a contemporary jet-powered trainer aircraft. Furthermore, RFB has claimed the type to be one-fifth as expensive to procure as the Cessna T-37 Tweet, a rival trainer, while delivering comparable performance (except for a slower top speed) at one-tenth of the fuel consumption. The design of the Fantrainer reportedly incorporates several features to increase effectiveness and reduce costs. Attention was also paid to ease of use, the engine is controlled via a single-lever power control with ground and flight idle stops, behaving much like a traditional turbojet unit; in general, both controls and instrumentation are clear and straightforward.

The engine and fan installation incorporates a freely-moving turbine, which necessitates constant-speed control over the fan along with the use of reduction gear to roughly halve the 6,000 rpm output of the engine to achieve a fan speed of 3,090 rpm; both of these were designed by British supplier Dowty Group. The constant speed of the five-bladed fan enables the use of a relatively simple blade profile. Various noise reduction measures were implemented, including the use of Hoffmann-sourced plastic-covered wooden blades and the adoption of a re-designed fan that used five blades instead of seven. The use of a foam-plastic rubbing strip enables the fan to maintain the optimum blade-tip-to-shroud gap, said to be one-thousandth of the fan's diameter according to RFB; the ring slot ensures smooth air flow even at high power and low airspeed, and can also open asymmetrically to cope with offset inflow when the Fantrainer is flown at a relatively high angle of attack.

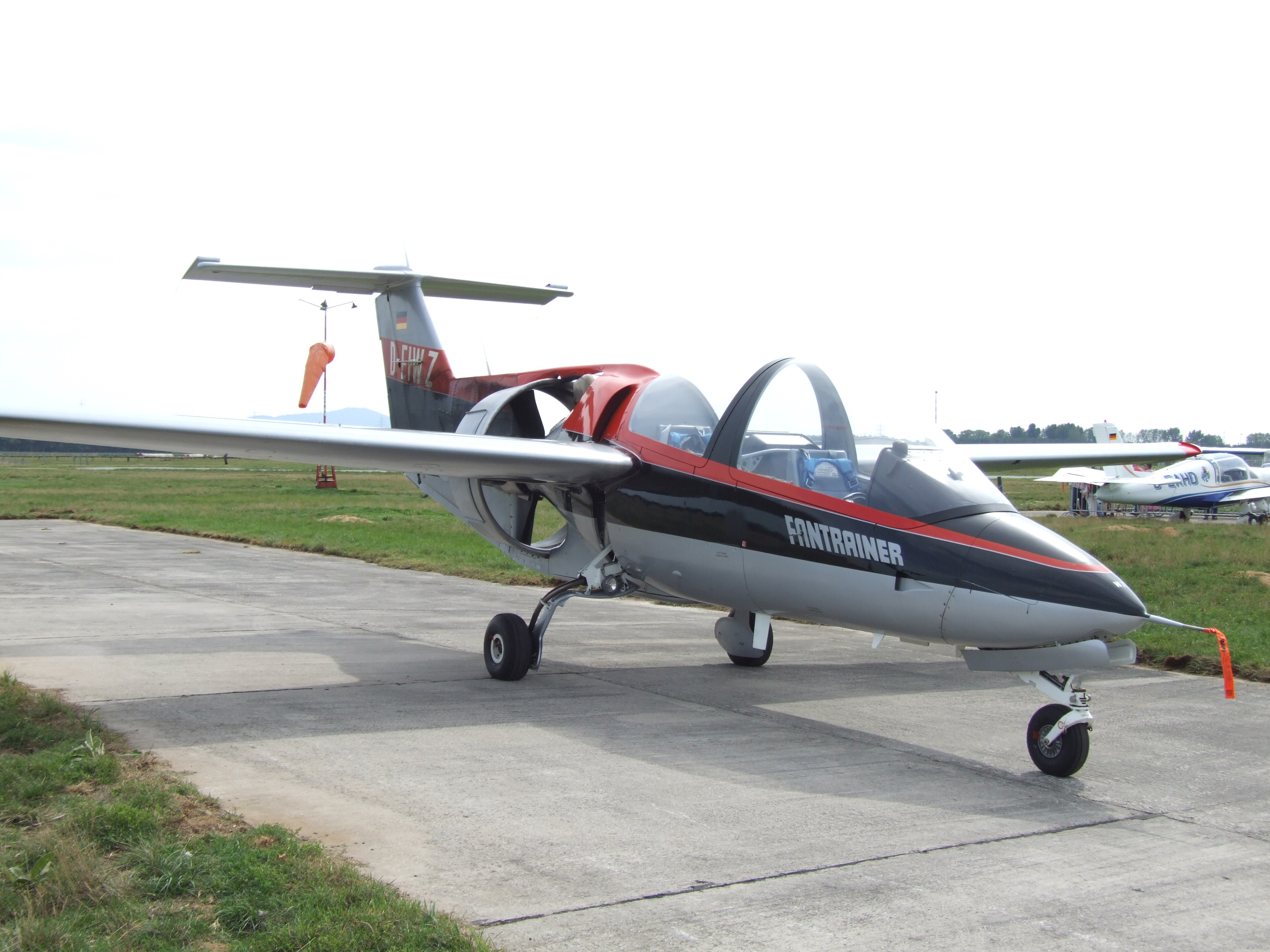
An RFB Fantrainer, 2008

Structurally, the Fantrainer's forward fuselage and centre section is formed around a metal box keel; the cockpit section, which is mainly composed of moulded plastic, is fixed upon this keel. This approach enables the cockpit shape to be readily modified, allowing it to be adapted to imitate various different aircraft. Typically, the cockpit is relatively spacious, providing room for a sizable instrumentation panel and ample side consoles, allowing the Fantrainer to be equipped akin to an air force's operational aircraft. Reportedly, the original cockpit was based on that of the Alpha Jet. The rear fuselage uses a conventional metal structure instead of plastics, which were unsuitable due to the presence of heat generated by the engine exhaust. To ease maintenance requirements, a modular approach is present in the Fantrainer's design, many of its systems are grouped together into single detachable units.

It is fitted with a forward-swept wing, being angled at 6°, for the purpose of not obscuring rear position's visibility by the wing root; this sweep angle had to be reduced to more closely mimic the flight characteristics expected of a typical military trainer aircraft. The design of this wing is not original, being a derivative of that previously used for the LFU 205, an experimental aircraft of the 1960s. The interior space of the wing accommodates a total of four 96-litre capacity fuel cells, which are integral to the wing structure; only two of the tanks can be filled when performing aerobatics. Both skin and internal structure of the wing are formed from a pair of moulded skins sandwiched upon a series of inflated plastic tubes. To facilitate greater performance, the wing can be shortened with relative ease according to RFB. A mixture of carbon and fiberglass is used for various elements, including the Friese ailerons and air brakes. Normal behaviour of both ailerons and air brakes has been observed even during deliberately-induced stall conditions.

== Variants ==
AWI-2
First prototype of the Fantrainer family. First flight in 1977 powered by two 150 shaft horsepower (110 kW) Wankel engines - 300 shaft horsepower (220 kW) in total, changed in 1978 to Allison engine.
ATI-2
Second prototype.
Fantrainer 400
Stretched fuselage version with metal wings, powered by a 406 kW (545 hp) Allison 250-C20B turboshaft engine.
Fantrainer 600
Improved version, powered by a 485-kW (650-hp) Allison 250-C30 turboshaft engine.
Fantrainer 800/1000/1200/1500
Upgraded versions, planned but not produced yet.
B.F.18
(Thai: บ.ฝ.๑๘) Royal Thai Armed Forces designation for the Fantrainer 400.
B.F.18A
(Thai: บ.ฝ.๑๘ก) Royal Thai Armed Forces designation for the Fantrainer 600.

=== Ranger 2000 ===
In the early 1990s, RFB and Rockwell International developed in a joint venture a jet-powered variation of the Fantrainer under the denomination Ranger 2000, which was evaluated as a trainer aircraft in the JPATS contest by the USAF and the U.S. Navy, but no orders were placed as the aircraft lost to the T-6 Texan II. One of the two prototypes crashed during evaluation. The Ranger 2000's turbofan engine was a Pratt & Whitney Canada JT15D.

== Operators ==
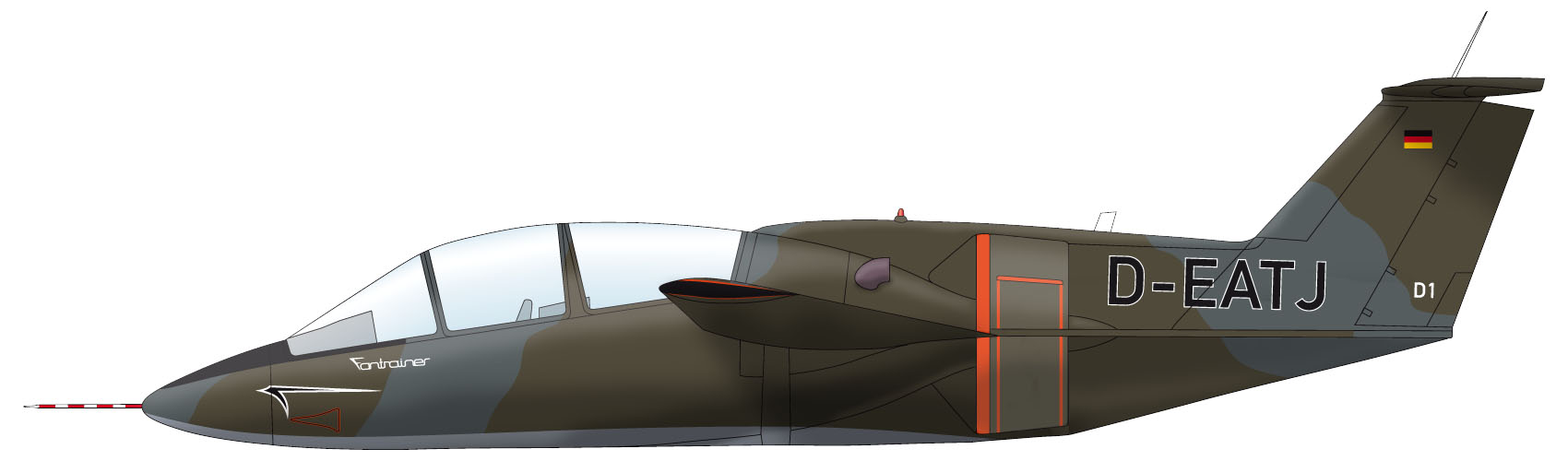
RFB Fantrainer 400 (D-EATJ)

Thailand

- Royal Thai Air Force

== Specifications (Fantrainer 600) ==
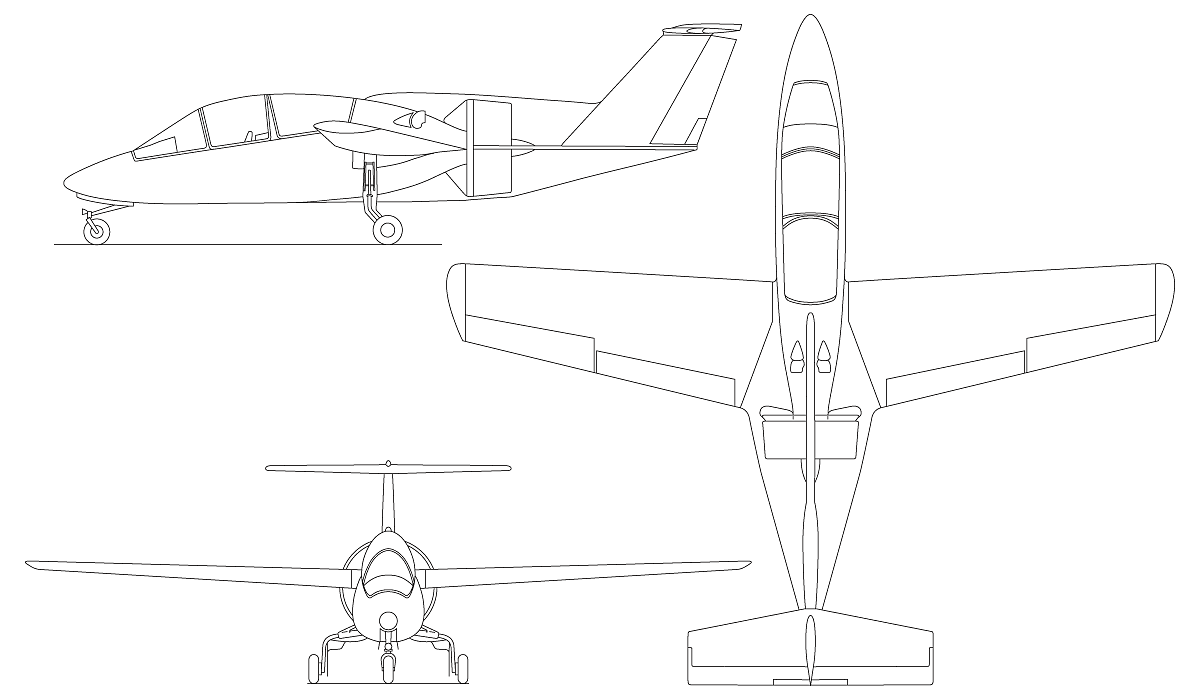
RFB Fantrainer 400

Data from Jane's All The World's Aircraft 1988–89

General characteristics

- Crew: 2
- Length: 9.20 m (30 ft 2 in)
- Wingspan: 9.74 m (31 ft 11 in)
- Height: 3.16 m (10 ft 4 in)
- Wing area: 14.00 m^{2} (150.7 sq ft)
- Aspect ratio: 6.8:1
- Airfoil: Eppler 502
- Empty weight: 1,160 kg (2,557 lb)
- Max takeoff weight: 2,300 kg (5,071 lb)
- Powerplant: 1 × Allison 250 C30 turboshaft, 480 kW (650 shp)
- Propellers: 5-bladed constant-speed ducted fan, 1.2 m (3 ft 11 in) diameter

Performance

- Maximum speed: 417 km/h (259 mph, 225 kn) at 5,490 m (18,000 ft)
- Cruise speed: 370 km/h (230 mph, 200 kn) at 3,050 m (10,000 ft)
- Never exceed speed: 555 km/h (345 mph, 300 kn)
- Range: 1,037 km (644 mi, 560 nmi)
- Endurance: 4 hours, 6 minutes
- Service ceiling: 7,620 m (25,000 ft)
- g limits: +6/-3 G
- Rate of climb: 15 m/s (3,000 ft/min)

== See also ==
Related development

- Rockwell Ranger 2000

Aircraft of comparable role, configuration, and era

- Embraer EMB 312 Tucano
- Fouga CM.170 Magister
- Grob G 120TP
- Pilatus PC-7
- SIAI-Marchetti SF.260

Related lists

- List of military aircraft of Germany
