= Textron AirLand Scorpion =

American military jet aircraft

Scorpion
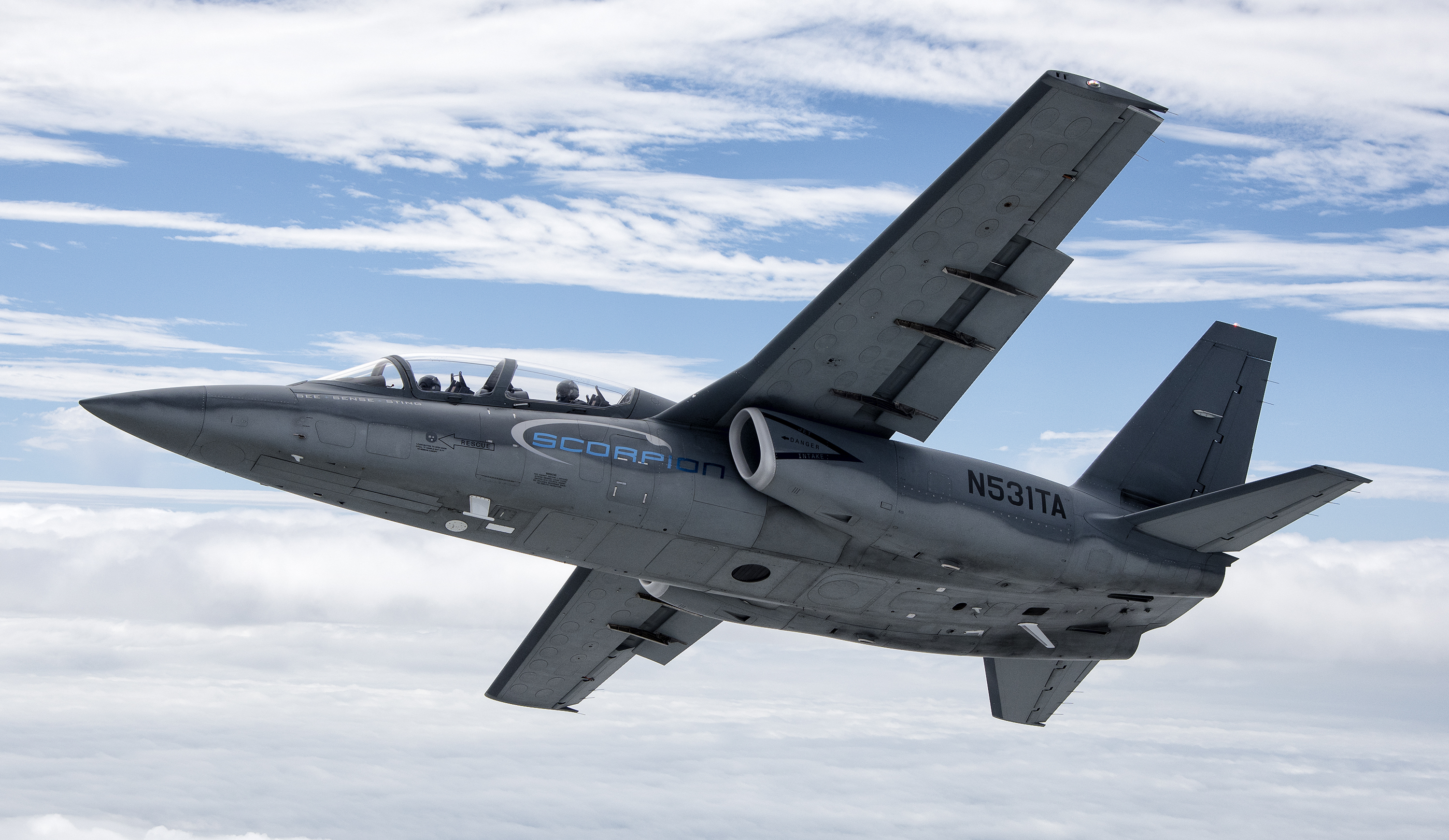
- Textron AirLand Scorpion flight, 2016

General information
- Type: Military light attack and reconnaissance aircraft
- National origin: United States
- Manufacturer: Textron AirLand, LLC
- Status: Under development
- Number built: 4

History
- First flight: 12 December 2013

The Textron AirLand Scorpion is a jet aircraft manufactured in the United States proposed for sale to perform light attack and intelligence, surveillance and reconnaissance (ISR) duties. It is being developed by Textron AirLand, a joint venture between Textron and AirLand Enterprises. A prototype was secretly constructed by Cessna at their Wichita, Kansas facility between April 2012 and September 2013 and first flown on 12 December 2013.

== Development ==
=== Background and design phase ===
In October 2011, a group of outside investors known as AirLand Enterprises LLC approached Textron with the concept of building the "world’s most affordable tactical jet aircraft." The two companies created a joint venture called Textron AirLand and development of an aircraft began in January 2012. Neither Textron nor its subsidiaries had much experience designing fixed-wing combat aircraft. Textron saw a market for the type: while military aircraft typically grew more expensive, defense budgets declined. Named Scorpion, the first concept had a single engine. In early 2012, engineers reviewed over 12 design configurations that would meet their goals and shortlisted four designs; the team eventually settled on the tandem-seat, twin-engine configuration.

The aircraft was kept secret, being identified by the code name SCV12-1, or simply "the project". At its peak, the production team was 200 people, which eventually decreased to 170, including 120 engineers. The outside contours were made in May 2012, and wing production started in August 2012. Unconventionally, wind tunnel tests were performed after wing parts were already being made. In a traditional aircraft development program, the Department of Defense or a military service would issue detailed requirements, potentially hundreds of pages long. Instead, Textron AirLand did a market and capability analysis to determine what domestic and foreign forces required but did not have.

The design team made up of personnel from Textron, Cessna, and Bell Helicopter was assembled in one building with everyone focused on the task, enabling decisions to be made in hours instead of days. To not alert any potential competitors, development was kept secret through non-disclosure agreements, obtaining parts from local suppliers, and the natural close-knit, "small town" nature of Wichita, Kansas. Technology from the Cessna inventory or other existing, readily-available components and hardware were used. In November, Textron spokesman David Sylvestre confirmed that Cessna had been involved in building the prototype Scorpion, but may not build any production models. Sylvestre stated, "depending on demand and manufacturing capacity needs, the final site of Scorpion manufacturing beyond the initial low rate production (2015) is yet to be decided. It may be built 'at' Cessna, but by the joint venture called Textron AirLand."

The Scorpion was unveiled on 16 September 2013. In 2014, the development-to-flight time was expected to take 4–5 years, the goal of the first flight within at least 24 months was achieved. The phrase "speed is paramount" serves as impetus for the program, with the objective of creating the plane, flying it, and selling it as fast as possible to not miss opportunities. If a customer had been found, production could have begun in 2015, with deliveries from 15 to 18 months after an order was received. The plan is to secure a contract first, then begin low-rate production and transition to full-rate production. Textron AirLand saw a market for up to 2,000 Scorpion jets.

=== Initial flight testing ===
The Scorpion demonstrator completed pre-flight taxi trials on 25 November 2013 in preparation for its first flight. The Scorpion first flew on 12 December 2013 for 1.4 hours. The aircraft has the civilian registration N531TA and is designated as a Cessna E530. The flight occurred 23 months after the aircraft's conception, and the flight certification program will last two years. Textron AirLand aimed to complete 500 flight hours and verify basic performance features by the end of 2014. Initial flight tests showed positive results in evaluations of performance and mechanical and electronic systems. On 9 April 2014, Textron AirLand announced that the Scorpion had reached 50 flight hours over 26 flights. It was flown as high as 30,000 ft (9,100 m), at speeds up to 310 kn (360 mph; 570 km/h) and 430 kn (490 mph; 800 km/h), and subjected to accelerations ranging from 3.7 to −0.5 g. Stall speed was identified at slower than 90 kn (100 mph; 170 km/h). Other tests performed included single-engine climbs and in-flight engine shutdown and restart. Pilots reported that the Scorpion was nimble, agile, and powerful even when flown on one engine, with good low speed characteristics. It also demonstrated an intercept of a Cessna 182. Few issues were encountered, attributed to the use of mature, non-developmental systems.

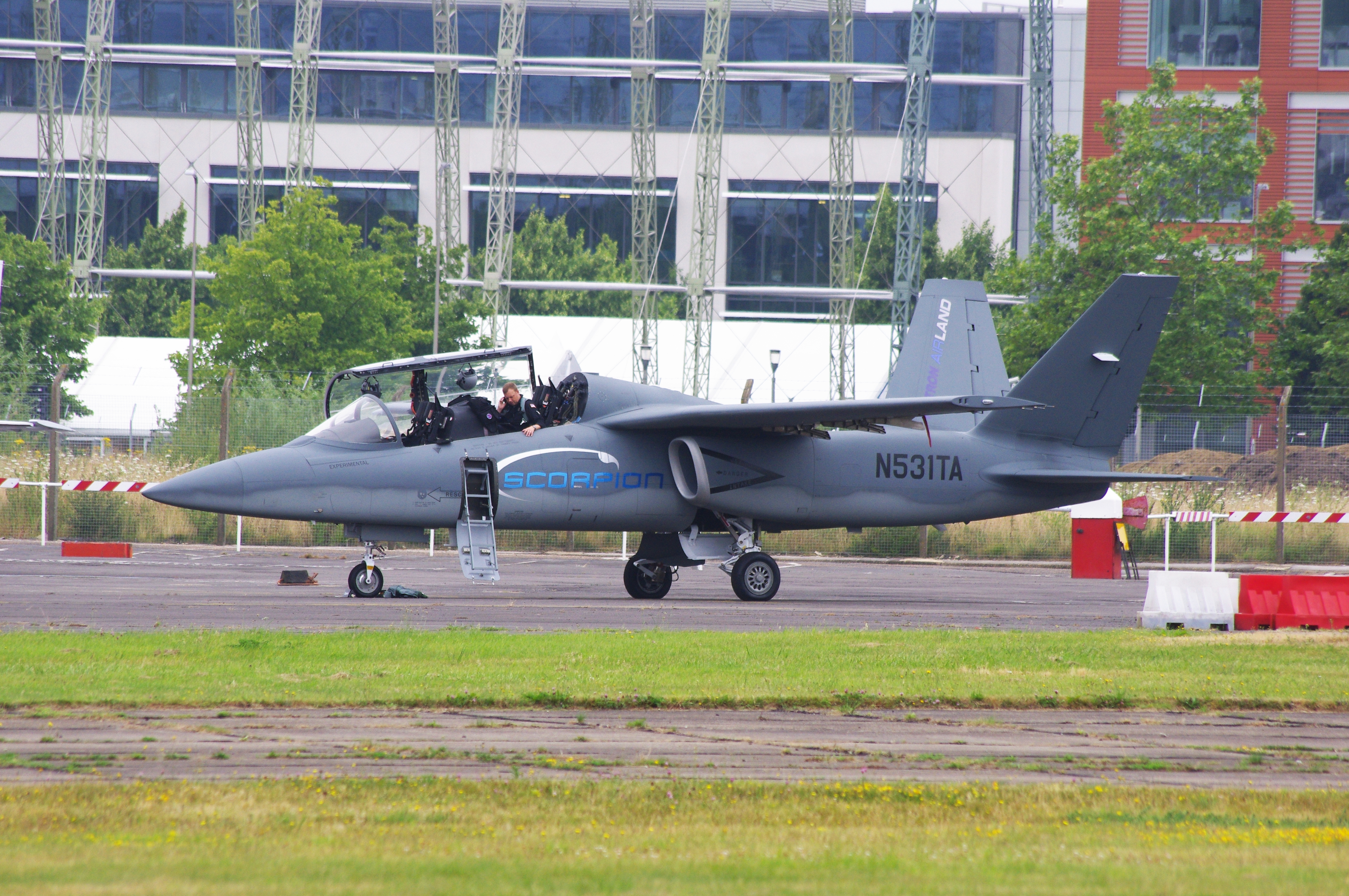
A Scorpion at the Farnborough International Airshow, July 2014

The Scorpion had flown 76.4 hours in 41 test flights by 19 May 2014; no planned flights were cancelled due to mechanical or maintenance issues. Incremental improvements were to be made to the aircraft over the course of testing. Participation in the Farnborough International Airshow in 2014 accelerated changes; modifications included an engine inlet ice protection system and a metal inlet leading edge in place of the composite one for flying in a broader range of weather conditions, a cockpit ladder so the pilot does not need a ground crew ladder, an onboard oxygen-generating system in place of oxygen bottles, and other non-urgent items. The modified Scorpion resumed flights on 1 June 2014. In July 2014, the Scorpion made its first public appearance at Farnborough Airshow.

The first production-standard aircraft first flew on the 22 December 2016. It has a simplified landing gear, increased wing sweep and new avionics including hands-on-throttle-and-stick controls.

== Design ==
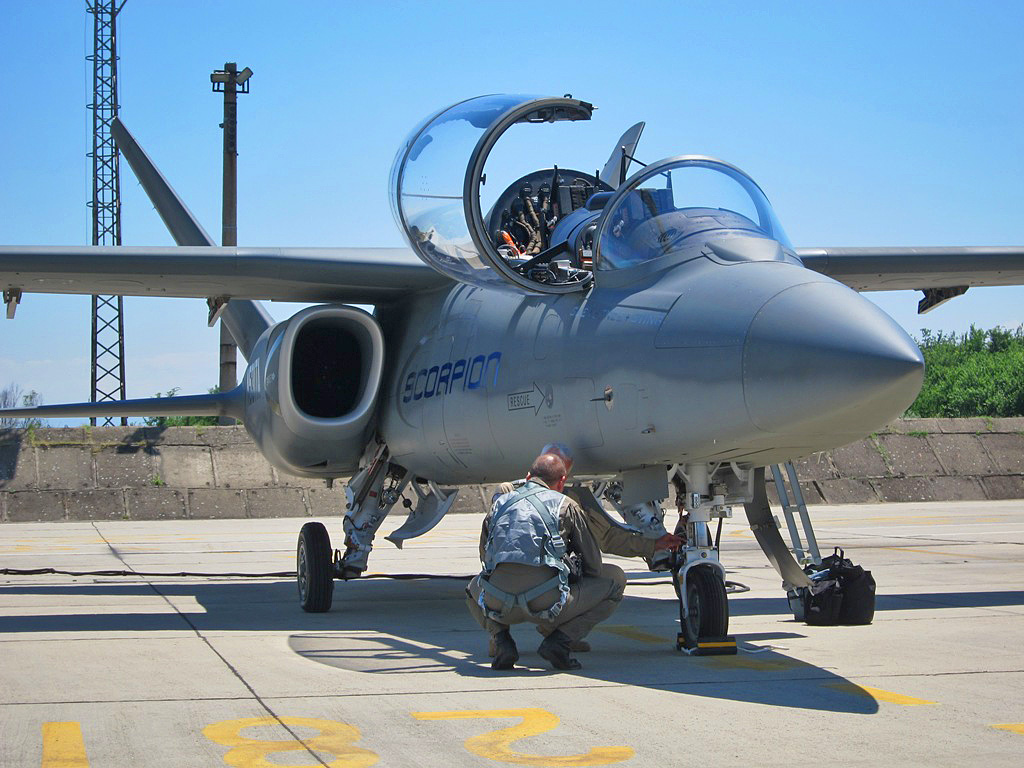
Textron AirLand Scorpion during pre-flight check at Bulgarian air base Graf Ignatievo

The Scorpion is a tandem-seat twinjet aircraft with an all-composite material fuselage designed for light attack and intelligence, surveillance, and reconnaissance missions. Production costs were minimized by using common commercial off the shelf technology, manufacturing resources and components developed for Cessna's business jets; such as the flap drive mechanism is from the Cessna Citation XLS and Cessna Citation Mustang, the aileron drive mechanism is from the Citation X. Textron AirLand calls the Scorpion an ISR/strike aircraft, instead of a "light attack" aircraft. The joint venture also states the Scorpion is intended to handle "non-traditional ISR" flights such as those performed by U.S. fighters in Iraq and Afghanistan. The Scorpion is designed to cheaply perform armed reconnaissance using sensors to cruise above 15,000 ft, higher than most ground fire can reach, and still be rugged enough to sustain minimal damage.

The Scorpion is designed to be affordable, costing US$3,000 per flight hour, with a unit cost expected to be below US$20 million. Although it is a two-seat aircraft, it can be flown by a single pilot. Textron AirLand selected Cobham plc to design the cockpit, which will feature modern flat-panel displays. The aircraft will not have fly-by-wire to keep costs down and simplify the design. The demonstrator, as well as production versions, are powered by two Honeywell TFE731 turbofans producing 8,000 lb (3,600 kg) of thrust total. According to Textron AirLand, endurance is optimized for spending 5 hours carrying out a loiter up to 150 miles from base. Kaman Composites, a subsidiary of Kaman Aerosystems, provided several components for the Scorpion prototype, including the wing assembly, vertical and horizontal stabilizers, wing fuel access panels, main landing gear doors, and several closeout panels.

Except for the landing gear and engine fittings and mounts, the airframe is all-composite with an anticipated service life of 20,000 hours. The Scorpion is to have a 3,000 lb (1,400 kg) payload of precision and non-precision munitions or intelligence-collecting equipment in a simplified and reconfigurable internal bay. The 14.4 m (47 ft) wings are largely unswept and have six hardpoints. A modular design allows for the wings to be removed and replaced by different wing designs. The internal payload bay has a payload capacity of 3,000 lb (1,400 kg). The external hardpoints have a payload capacity of 6,200 lb (2,800 kg).

== Operational history ==
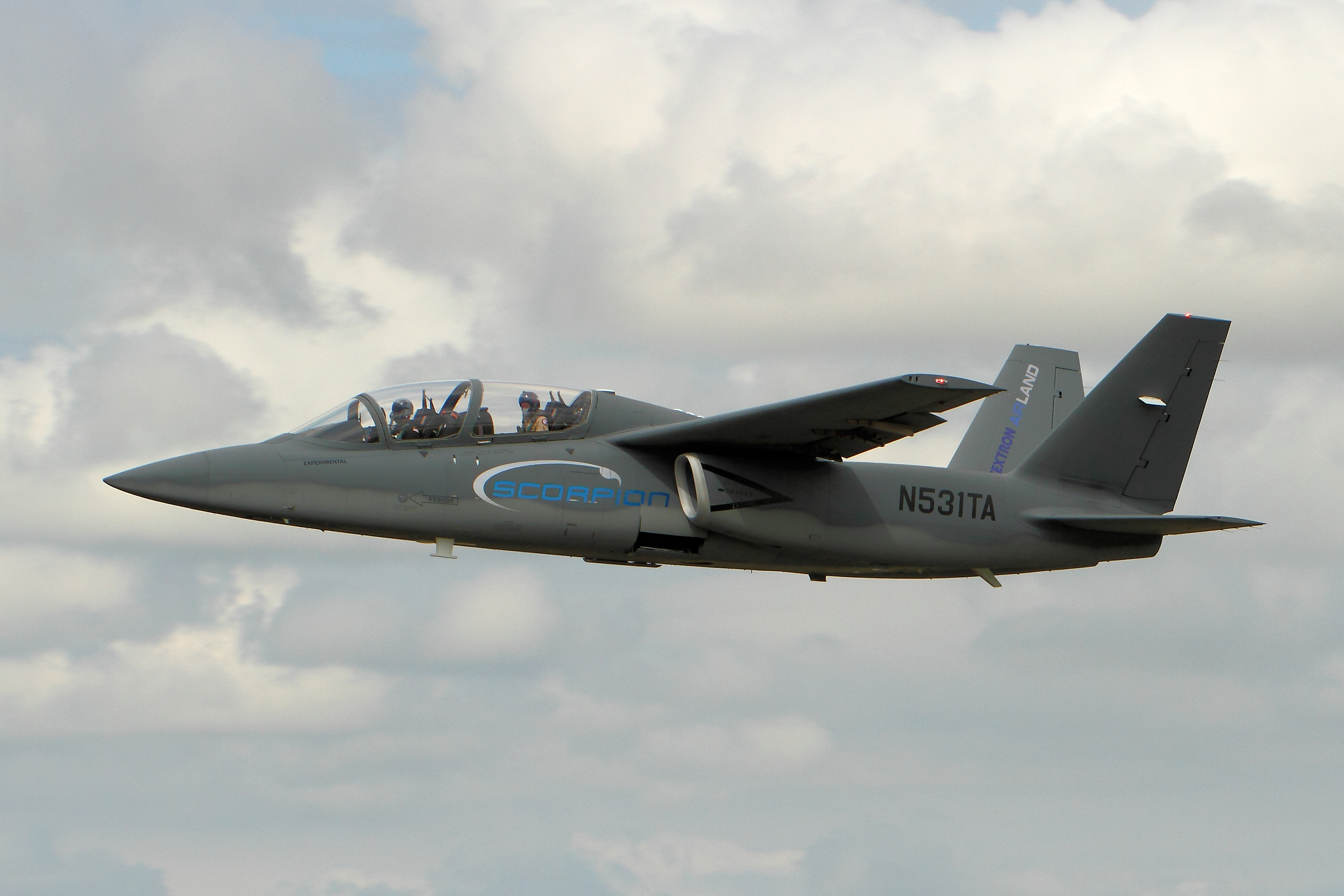
Textron AirLand Scorpion

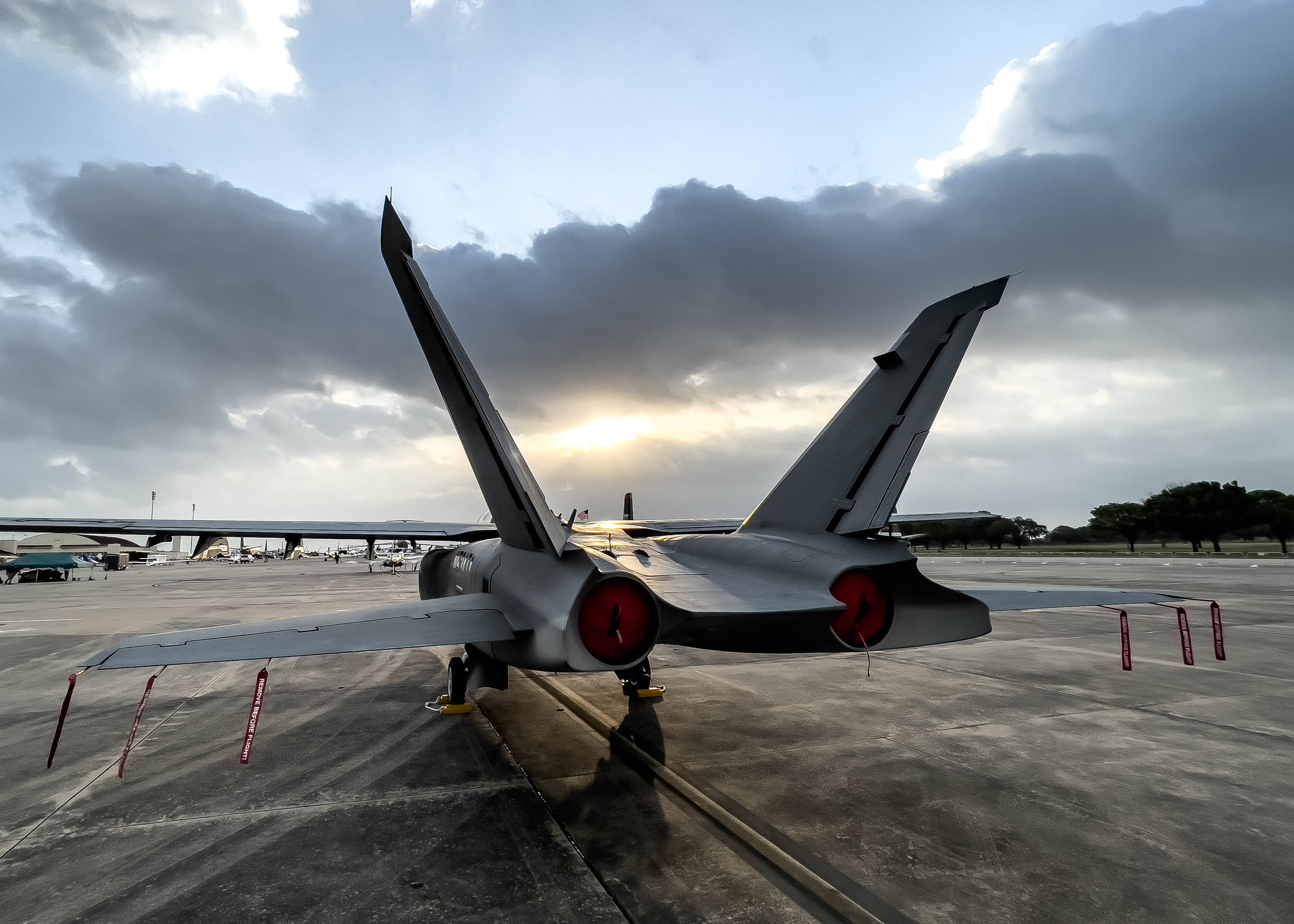
Rear view of a Scorpion in 2022

=== Later flight testing ===
In August 2014, the Scorpion participated in a scenario which involved a mock large chemical spill, requiring cleanup and search-and-rescue operations. A Textron test pilot flew the Scorpion, which circled the area for a few hours while transmitting full motion video to U.S. Air National Guard members. The purpose was to demonstrate the aircraft's intelligence and reconnaissance capabilities to fill a niche for Air National Guard missions, and be a promotional exercise. The Scorpion achieved 100 percent mission availability, providing color HD full motion video and communications with other aircraft and ground stations.

=== Sales opportunities ===
The aircraft is intended to handle mission profiles typically performed by the U.S. Air National Guard, including domestic interdiction, quick-reaction natural disaster support, air sovereignty patrols, and low-threat battlefield missions. The manufacturer claims it to be low-cost and operate for about US$3,000 per hour. The light attack and reconnaissance roles are typically filled by turboprop airplanes and UAVs, often at lower cost. A concept for U.S. military adoption revolves around the Lockheed Martin F-35 Lightning II, a high-cost aircraft for high-threat missions; a requirement could emerge for the low-cost Scorpion to handle low-threat missions. It could reopen the historically small market for tactical aircraft; a projected 60 nations may require tactical aircraft but cannot afford high-end types. Nations operating turboprop aircraft may view the Scorpion as a cost-effective jet replacement, and F-16 operators may see a less capable aircraft as being able to meet many of their requirements.

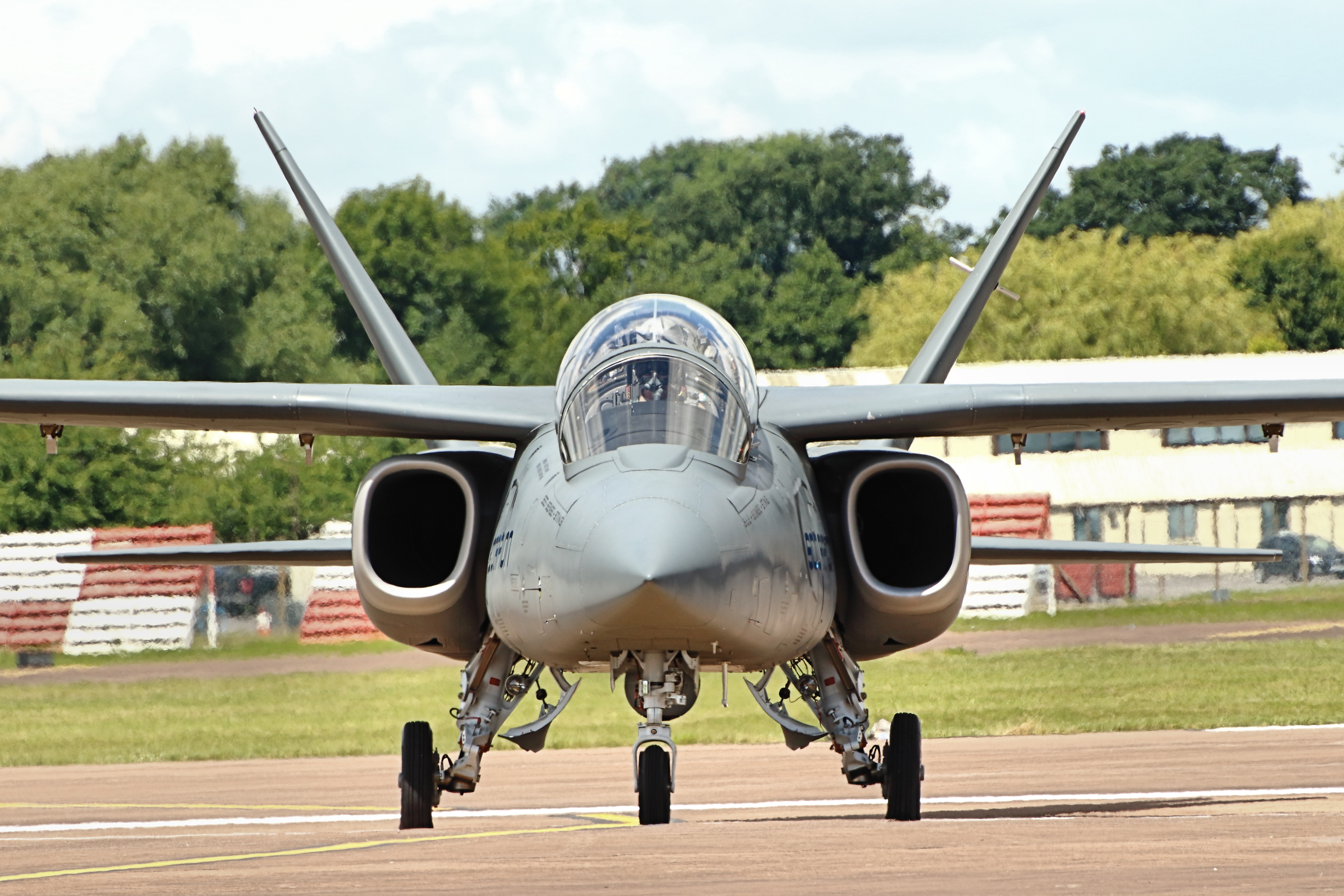
Front view of a Scorpion in 2016

The target market is the U.S. Air National Guard and foreign nations that cannot afford the F-35, but want an aircraft to perform ISR and light attack missions better than turboprop planes. Buying and sustaining the Scorpion would cost less than A-10 or F-16 upgrades. For air patrol, the Scorpion requires radar and the capability of supersonic flight, similar to the unsuccessful 1980s-era Northrop F-20 Tigershark. The market for light fixed-wing attack jets had declined in the 1980s as richer countries opted for more capable aircraft and poorer countries pursued turboprops and attack helicopters. It is uncertain if the Scorpion will be cheaper or outperform turboprops or remotely piloted aircraft (RPA) in terms of range, endurance, low-altitude performance, and sensors.

The U.S. Air Force has made plans to retire the A-10 Thunderbolt II, with its close air support mission to be initially covered by F-16s and F-15Es until it can transition to the F-35A. An inexpensive replacement aircraft may be considered to perform CAS against enemies without sophisticated air defenses. Analysts believe that the Scorpion will be difficult to sell to the Air Force; Textron AirLand believes it can sell without a requirement or lengthy competition. Budget cuts make new programs unattractive, and its missions of irregular warfare, border patrol, maritime surveillance, emergency relief, counter narcotics, and air defense operations are performed by RPAs. However, the Air Force pursued fully developed aircraft, excluding the Scorpion that lacked data on the cost of sustainment.

The Air National Guard has been under pressure by active Air Force officials to replace aging and costly F-16s and A-10s, and promoted uncrewed aircraft. Air National Guard leaders feel losing crewed aircraft to remotely piloted types would leave them ill-equipped for domestic emergencies, such as natural disasters and homeland security crises. While potentially politically motivated, some state governments have voiced apprehension of drones, fearing regulatory restrictions that could cripple a drone's ability to respond during disasters.

Following the first flight, discussions were scheduled with an unnamed foreign customer. U.S. military components and at least one more foreign country are also interested in discussions. The company stated that interest from military and paramilitary organizations had been positive and that they intended to sell the aircraft for under US$20M each. Preliminary discussion were held with the militaries of Malaysia, Brunei, the Philippines, Indonesia, Bahrain, Qatar, and Saudi Arabia. In November 2014, sources confirmed that the United Arab Emirates had held discussions on using the Scorpion for the Al Fursan aerobatic squadron and Textron believed this could lead to an expanded military role. However, the UAE was reluctant to be the launch customer for a new aircraft and wanted another customer to be found first before officially signing on. A deal was intended to have been finalized by 2016, but was not completed.

In November 2014, the Nigerian Air Force expressed interest in up to a squadron's worth of Scorpions to counter the Boko Haram insurgency. The Scorpion would combine surveillance and effective strike capabilities in one airframe. Nigeria operates the unarmed ATR 42 to detect targets, which are then relayed to a Chengdu F-7Ni, which are armed but lack precision guided weapons. Given a previous rejection for attack helicopters, approval for Nigeria may not be guaranteed.

On 27 April 2015, the Scorpion made a series of display flights for the Colombian Air Force at the Apiay Air Base. Colombia is currently looking to replace their fleet of Cessna A-37 Dragonfly with similar aircraft.

U.S. Secretary of Defense Ashton Carter was expected to offer the Scorpion to the Indian Air Force during his visit to the country in June 2015. Although designed for reconnaissance and light strike, India has expressed interest in using it as an intermediate jet trainer due to repeated delays to the HAL HJT-36 Sitara jet trainer aircraft.

On 12 July 2016, QinetiQ, Thales and Textron AirLand announced a collaboration to bid for the UK Ministry of Defence's upcoming Air Support to Defence Operational Training (ASDOT) program. The three companies’ CEOs met at Farnborough International Airshow to announce the signing of their Memorandum of Understanding (MOU) setting the foundation for the bid. The operational training activities that will comprise the ASDOT program are being fulfilled by a number of providers, both military and civilian. This team plans to propose an innovative, cost effective, technologically advanced, and reliable managed service using the Textron AirLand Scorpion equipped with Thales and QinetiQ sensors to provide a broad spectrum of training for all three armed services. The competitive contract, expected to be awarded in September 2018 with a service delivery start in Jan 2020, is anticipated to be worth up to £1.2 billion over 15 years.

In February 2018 the Scorpion was eliminated from the USAF's Light Attack/Armed Reconnaissance aircraft competition, in favor of the Beechcraft AT-6 Wolverine and the Embraer A-29 Super Tucano. Air Force Secretary Heather Wilson described the AT-6 and A-29 as "most promising".

== Variants ==
=== Trainer ===
On 23 August 2014, Textron AirLand confirmed that the Scorpion would be entered in the U.S. Air Force's T-X trainer program competition. Only small modifications would be made, including shortening the wings to less than 47 ft (14.3 m) and making them more aerodynamic, as well as increasing the engine's thrust at the expense of fuel efficiency for greater maneuverability; the twin-engine, twin-tail design would be retained. The trainer variant could also help secure international orders. The Scorpion's per hour flight cost is relatively close to the $2,200 per hour cost of the T-6 Texan II propeller trainer and international markets have a history of using one aircraft type to perform both training and light attack missions. However, in September 2015 the company revealed that they would not offer a modification of the Scorpion for the T-X, given the change in Air Force requirements favoring a high-performance aircraft.

== Specifications ==
Data from Manufacturer

General characteristics

- Crew: 2
- Length: 45 ft 6 in (13.87 m)
- Wingspan: 47 ft 10 in (14.58 m)
- Height: 13 ft 4 in (4.06 m)
- Wing area: 175.3 sq ft (16.29 m^{2})
- Empty weight: 12,700 lb (5,761 kg)
- Max takeoff weight: 22,000 lb (9,979 kg)
- Fuel capacity: 6,000 lb (2,722 kg)
- Powerplant: 2 × Honeywell TFE731 turbofan, 4,000 lbf (18 kN) thrust each

Performance

- Maximum speed: 450 kn (520 mph, 830 km/h)
- Stall speed: 95 kn (109 mph, 176 km/h) (max)
- Ferry range: 2,200 nmi (2,500 mi, 4,100 km) with auxiliary fuel
- Service ceiling: 45,000 ft (14,000 m)

Armament

- Hardpoints: 6 with a capacity of 6,200 lb (2,800 kg), and an internal bay with a 3,000 lb (1,400 kg) of armaments and other stores, with provisions to carry combinations of:
  - Rockets: Various rockets
  - Missiles: Infrared air-to-air and laser-guided missiles
  - Bombs: precision and non-precision munitions
  - Other: Gun pod
- Rockets: APKWS
- Missiles:
  - air-to-air missile AIM-9X Sidewinder
  - air-to-surface missile AGM-114F Hellfire
  - air-to-surface missile G-CLAW
  - air-to-surface missile AGM-65 Maverick
- Bombs:
- guided bombs GBU-39/B Small Diameter
- guided bombs GBU-12/58 Paveway II

Avionics

- Flight Management System, Built-In
- Terrain Awareness and Warning System (TAWS), Class-B
- Dual Inertial Reference System
- Dual Global Positioning System/Satellite-Based Augmentation System (GPS/SBAS)
- External Video display (Mission Processor, EO/IR, etc.) – Sensor Agnostic
- Garmin Synthetic Vision Technology (SVT)
- Touch-screen control panels
- Weather Radar Controls
- Night Vision Compatible
- Digital In Flight Sensor Playback for Forensic Analysis
- Thales I-Master Radar

== See also ==
- Cessna 526 CitationJet
