= Rockwell Ranger 2000 =

Type of aircraft

Ranger 2000

General information
- Type: Primary jet trainer
- National origin: United States
- Manufacturer: Rockwell International
- Number built: 3

History
- First flight: 15 January 1993
- Developed from: RFB Fantrainer

The Rockwell Ranger 2000 was a jet trainer candidate for the United States Joint Primary Aircraft Training System proposed by Rockwell International with assistance from Rhein-Flugzeugbau GmbH (RFB) in Germany.

== Design and development ==
The United States military issued a Request for proposal for a jet trainer for use by the United States Air Force and United States Navy. Rockwell responded with the Ranger 2000 two-seat, single engined cantilever monoplane. The design was based on the work of RFB, in particular the RFB Fantrainer and the prototypes were built in Germany.

The Ranger 2000 was powered by a Pratt & Whitney Canada JT15D-5C turbofan mounted in the rear fuselage and fed by two air intakes above the wing roots. It used retractable tricycle landing gear, the wing was straight and low-mounted, and the crew of two sat in tandem with the rear instructor raised to maintain visibility. Both crew had a Stencel zero-zero ejection seat.

The aircraft first flew on 15 January 1993 at Manching in Germany. The second prototype was lost in an accident on 25 July 1993. The first prototype was shipped to Rockwell in the United States but the first flight of the third prototype was delayed until 20 June 1994 for modification, the main change was the move of the speedbrakes from the upper wing surface to the rear fuselage.

The Ranger 2000 did not succeed in the competition, which was won by a variant of the Pilatus PC-9 which became the T-6 Texan II.

== Aircraft on display ==
- One of the Ranger 2000s is displayed at the Tulsa Air and Space Museum.

== Specifications ==
Data from

General characteristics

- Crew: 2
- Length: 35 ft 9.5 in (10.91 m)
- Wingspan: 34 ft 3.5 in (10.45 m)
- Wing area: 167.4 sq ft (15.55 m^{2})
- Gross weight: 7,900 lb (3,583 kg)
- Powerplant: 1 × Pratt & Whitney Canada JT15D-5C , 3,190 lbf (14.2 kN) thrust

Performance

- Maximum speed: 392 mph (630 km/h, 341 kn)

== See also ==
- Joint Primary Aircraft Training System

Related development

- RFB Fantrainer

Aircraft of comparable role, configuration, and era

- Pilatus PC-9
- T-6 Texan II

Related lists

- List of military aircraft of the United States
