= Joint Primary Aircraft Training System =

US training aircraft procurement program

Joint Primary Aircraft Training System (JPATS)
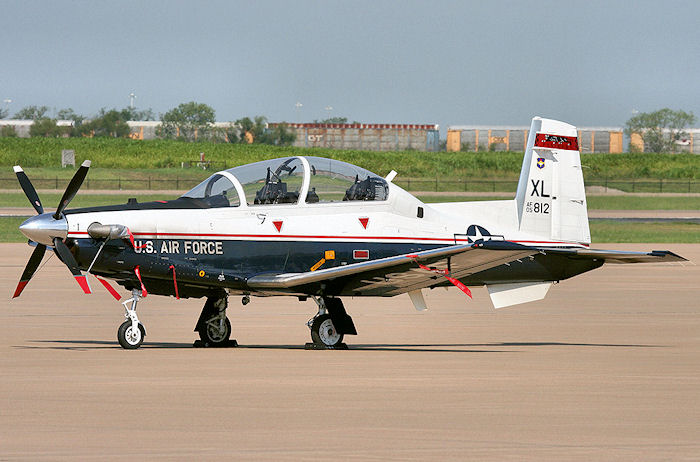
- A USAF T-6A Texan II at Laughlin AFB, Texas

General information
- Project for: Primary training aircraft
- Service: United States Air Force; United States Navy
- Proposals: Cessna 526 CitationJet; Embraer EMB-312H Super Tucano; Vought Pampa 2000; Lockheed T-Bird II; Beech-Pilatus PC-9 Mk 2 Rockwell Ranger 2000; SIAI Marchetti S.211

History
- Concluded: 1995
- Outcome: Beech-Pilatus PC-9 Mk 2 selected for production as the Beechcraft T-6 Texan II
- Predecessors: Next Generation Trainer (NGT)

The Joint Primary Aircraft Training System (JPATS) was an aircraft procurement program of the United States in the 1990s by the United States Air Force and United States Navy, a merger of 1980s era training aircraft programs. The winner was declared in 1995 and entered service a few years later as the Beechcraft T-6 Texan II. The program was partly a result of the cancelled Fairchild T-46 of the 1980s.

In 1995, the selection of Beech Aircraft Corporation of Wichita, Kansas, to develop and deliver the JPATS was made. The aircraft would be manufactured by Raytheon, Beechcraft's parent company, starting in the late 1990s and into the early 21st century. The companies that initially responded and competed were Vought, Northrop, Grumman, Rockwell, Beechcraft, Lockheed, and Cessna. However, by the time the selection was over, Northrop, Grumman, and Vought were all part of the same larger company. Over 700 JPATS are intended to be bought over time.

== History ==
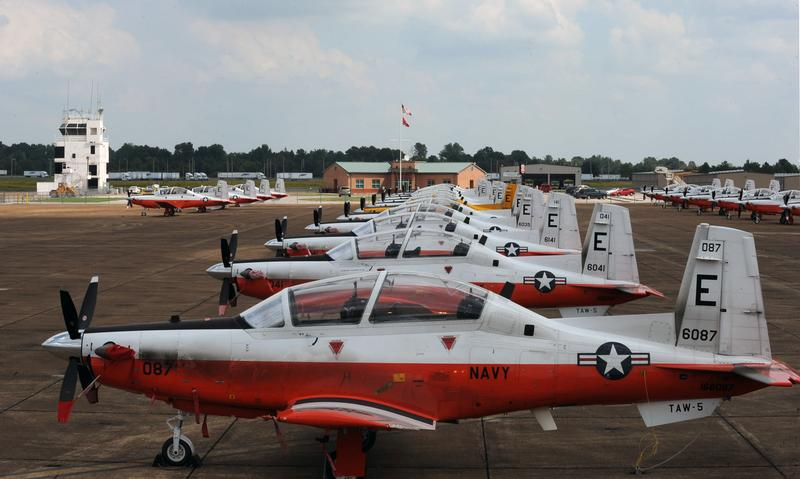
Navy T-6B Texan IIs belonging to Training Air Wing 5 out of NAS Whiting Field

In 1988, the United States Navy (USN) and the United States Air Force (USAF) were at a unique moment in history; they reached a point where they could work together, and provide a cost-effective solution to pilot production, specifically primary training. Both services needed to modernize their fleets of training aircraft.

The USAF and the USN cleared the first major obstacle on the subject of commonality. Each service preferred a different seating configuration. The USAF preferred the side-by-side configuration, while the USN preferred the tandem configuration. These preferences may have been due to each service's previous experience in training aircraft. The T-37 is a side-by-side configuration, while the T-34C is a tandem arrangement. The hurdle was cleared when both services agreed on the tandem configuration.

The JPATS selection process began on 18 May 1994, when the RFP was issued. Seven contractors responded to the JPATS RFP:

- Beechcraft, part of Raytheon at that time
- Cessna
- Grumman, merged with Northrop in 1994 to form Northrop Grumman
- Lockheed, merged with Martin Marietta in 1995 to form Lockheed Martin
- Northrop Corporation, merged with Grumman in 1994 to form Northrop Grumman
- Rockwell (worked with MBB/DASA for JPATS)
- Vought, originally part of LTV, bought by Northrop in 1994

The process took fourteen months and entailed evaluations of seven aircraft, seven cockpit mockups, and thousands of pages of contractor proposals.

Beechcraft/Raytheon, with a modified Swiss Pilatus PC-9 Mk 2 aircraft, was awarded the prime contract on 22 June 1995. The contract contained a nine-year period of performance through FY2004, and a production run continuing through FY2017. Concurrent with the contract award, Raytheon Aircraft Company (RAC) was also provided the GBTS Request for Contract Change Proposal (CCP).

It was designated under the 1962 United States Tri-Service aircraft designation system, skipping some numbers using the same designation as the older North American T-6 Texan which, while also used under the post-1962 system, had been originally designated in an older system.

== Contenders ==
The seven main Contenders included:

- Beech-Pilatus PC-9 Mk 2, which won the competition; produced as the T-6 Texan II
- Cessna 526 CitationJet
- Lockheed T-Bird II, partnered with Aermachhi based on the Aermacchi MB-339
- Northrop Super Tucano EMB-312H – an improved EMB-312 Tucano with uprated engine and other improvements.
- Grumman S.211A a modified SIAI Marchetti S.211.
- Rockwell Ranger 2000 based on the RFB Fantrainer.
- Vought Pampa 2000 – a modified FMA IA 63
