= Cessna CitationJet/M2 =

Light business jet

CitationJet/CJ/M2 series
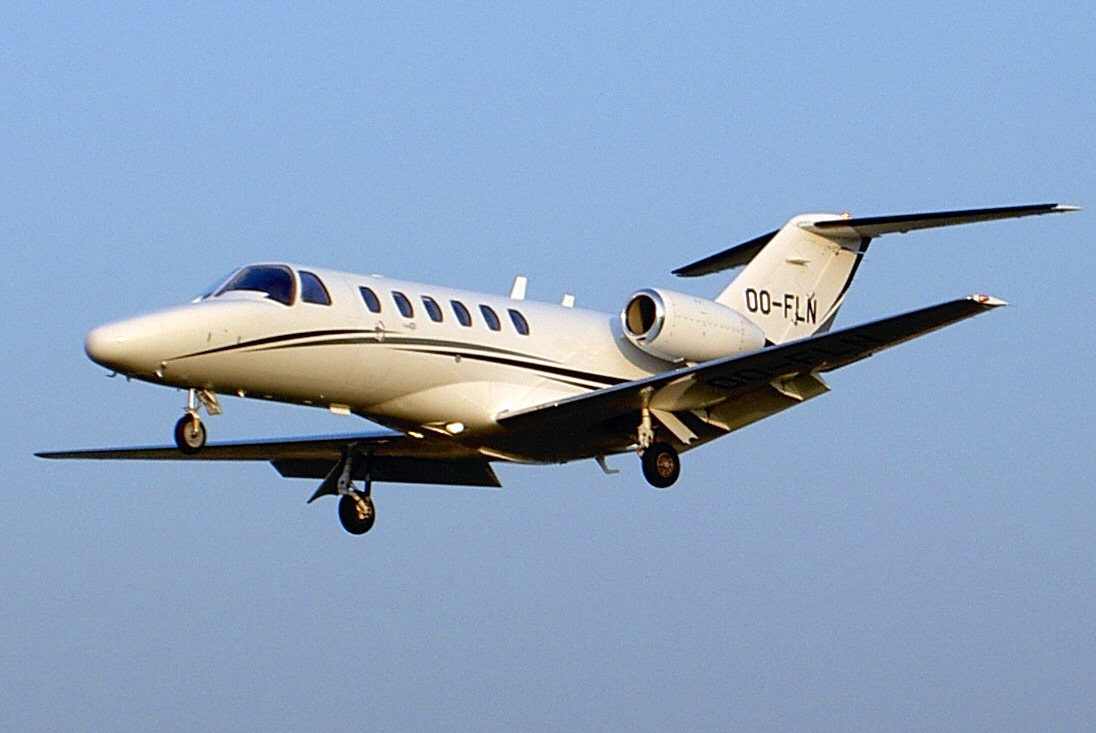
- A 525A CJ2, gear and flaps extended

General information
- Type: Business jet
- National origin: United States
- Manufacturer: Cessna
- Status: Active, in production
- Number built: 2000 as of June 8, 2017

History
- Manufactured: 1991–present
- First flight: 29 April 1991
- Developed from: Cessna Citation II
- Developed into: Cessna 526 CitationJet

The Cessna CitationJet/CJ/M2 (also known as the Model 525) are a series of light business jets built by Cessna, and are part of the Citation family. Launched in October 1989, the first flight of the Model 525 was on April 29, 1991. Federal Aviation Administration (FAA) certification was awarded on October 16, 1992, and the first aircraft was delivered on March 30, 1993. The CJ series are powered by two Williams FJ44 engines; the design uses the Citation II's forward fuselage with a new carry-through section wing and a T-tail.

The original CitationJet model was updated into the CJ1/CJ1+/M2 variants, and the CJ1 was stretched into the CJ2/CJ2+, which was built between 2000 and 2016. Two additional fuselage stretches yielded the CJ3/CJ3+, built from December 2004 to present, and finally the CJ4, which features a moderately swept wing and has been built since 2010. By June 2017, 2,000 of all variants had been delivered. In 2021, Cessna announced updated versions of the M2, CJ3, and CJ4 marketed as the Citation Gen2, and in 2024 the company announced plans for the Citation Gen3, which is expected to enter service in 2026.

== Development ==
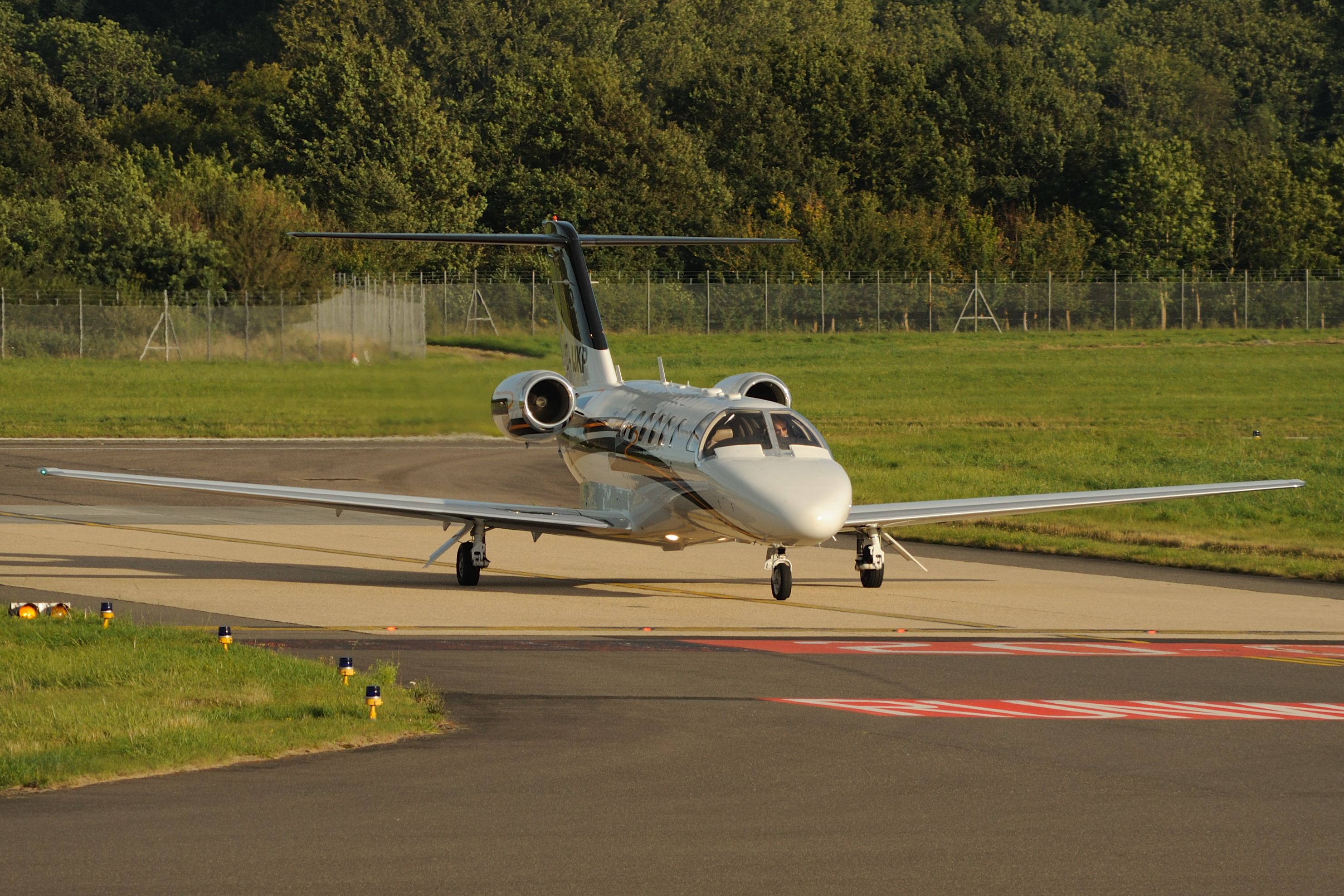
Like several other members of the Citation family, the CitationJets are certified for single pilot operations.

Development of the CitationJet was prompted by the 1985 discontinuation of the Citation I, a reaction to the increasing price of its Pratt & Whitney JT15D-1 engines, which rendered it uncompetitive with its larger straight wing Citation stablemates. Cessna believed that a substantial market still existed for a light 4-5 passenger jet with low operating costs, docile flying qualities, and the ability to operate from short runways usable by twin piston-engined light aircraft, a formula that had made the Citation I successful. However, that aircraft had been stigmatized for its slower cruise speed than its competitors, which had progressively been addressed in the Citation S/II and Bravo and the Citation V, Ultra and Encore, but at the cost of operating economy. To offer increased speed with reduced purchase and operating costs, Cessna engineers realized that a new, lighter airframe design would be needed, using less expensive and lower-thrust engines. To better compete with newer jets, Cessna also wanted to eliminate the step in the center aisle of the earlier Citations, created by the spar passing through the cabin.

Cessna launched the $2.4 million (equivalent to $6.23 million in 2025) model 525 CitationJet at the October 1989 NBAA convention in Atlanta, estimating a demand for 1,000 aircraft over ten years. Its first flight was on April 29, 1991, a Federal Aviation Administration (FAA) type certificate was awarded on October 16, 1992, and first delivery happened on March 30, 1993. The aircraft met its initial design goal: its normal cruise speed was 29 kn (33 mph; 54 km/h) faster than that of the Citation I, and the newer CitationJet outperformed the older Citation I in all other significant metrics except maximum payload and approach noise, despite having 600 lbf (2.7 kN) less total engine thrust.

In 2013, the CJ1 was rebranded as the Citation M2, which features extensive cabin upgrades, more thrust, winglets, improved performance, and the Garmin G3000 avionics suite. The M2 became Cessna's entry-level jet when the smaller and less capable Citation Mustang was dropped in May 2017.

Twenty years after its first flight, 1,450 CJs had been produced. As of June 2017, 2,000 of all variants had been delivered, with five million hours flown. In 2017,

In 2021, Cessna announced new versions of the CJ1/M2, CJ3, and CJ4 branded as the Citation Gen2, introducing more advanced avionics, autothrottles, and a variety of cabin and cockpit upgrades. In 2024, the company announced plans for equivalent Citation Gen3 models, which are planned to debut the Garmin G3000 PRIME avionics suite and to introduce Garmin emergency autoland in the CJ/M2 series.

== Design ==
The six-seat CitationJet is a monoplane with a cantilever wing, a retractable tricycle landing gear and a pressurized cabin.

The jet uses the Citation II's forward fuselage, a new carry-through section, a new laminar flow, supercritical wing developed with NASA and Boeing, and a T-tail. Powered by two 1,900 lbf (8.5 kN) Williams FJ44s, the 10,000 lb (4,500 kg) aircraft has a trailing link undercarriage for smooth landings, and can be flown by a single pilot. Range is 1,500 nmi (1,700 mi; 2,800 km) with four passengers and it can cruise at 437 kn (503 mph; 809 km/h).

The CitationJet retains the 58-inch (147 cm) inside diameter, circular fuselage cross-section of the Citation I and II, a semi-monocoque construction of conventional aluminum alloys assembled with rivets, fasteners and adhesive bonding. To reduce interference drag, a large fairing encases the low wing center section, and the engines are mounted high on the tail. Composite materials save weight in non-load-bearing components including fairings and the nose radome. The cockpit features EFIS avionics; fuselage length is reduced 11 inches (27 cm) compared to the Citation I, and cabin length is reduced by 1 ft 6 in (46 cm), but with a lowered center aisle for increased cabin height. The cockpit side windows are slightly smaller than those on earlier Citations to lessen interior temperature differences between the cockpit and the main cabin.

Wing structure is a conventional ladder with chord-wise ribs over front and rear spars, and an aft sub spar to support the landing gear. The NASA high-speed 0213 airfoil sustains natural laminar flow over 30% of the upper surface for 10-15% better lift-to-drag ratio than the larger NACA 23000-series wing of the Citation I. To maintain the wing's laminar-flow qualities and reduce weight, icing protection is provided by ducted bleed air rather than the deicing boots or fluid deicing systems used on earlier Citations.

Its FJ44 engine has a 16:1 overall pressure ratio and a 2.58:1 bypass ratio. Early CitationJet models have a novel design feature to reduce weight: rather than conventional thrust reversers, the aircraft are equipped with thrust attenuator paddles that pivot from the rear fuselage, similar to those used on the Cessna T-37 Tweet military trainer.

== Variants ==
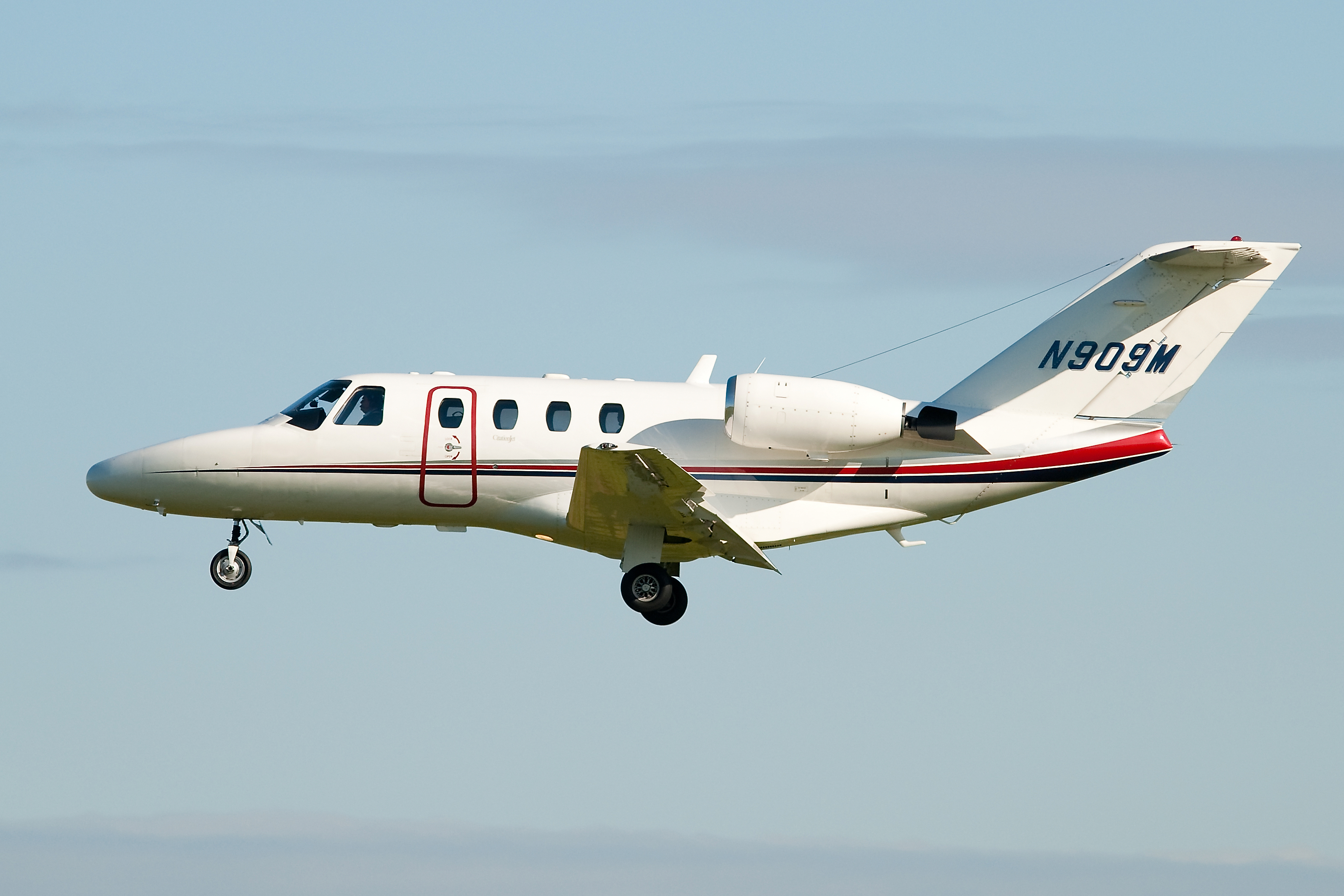
CJ1 side view, four windows, thrust attenuator paddles behind engines

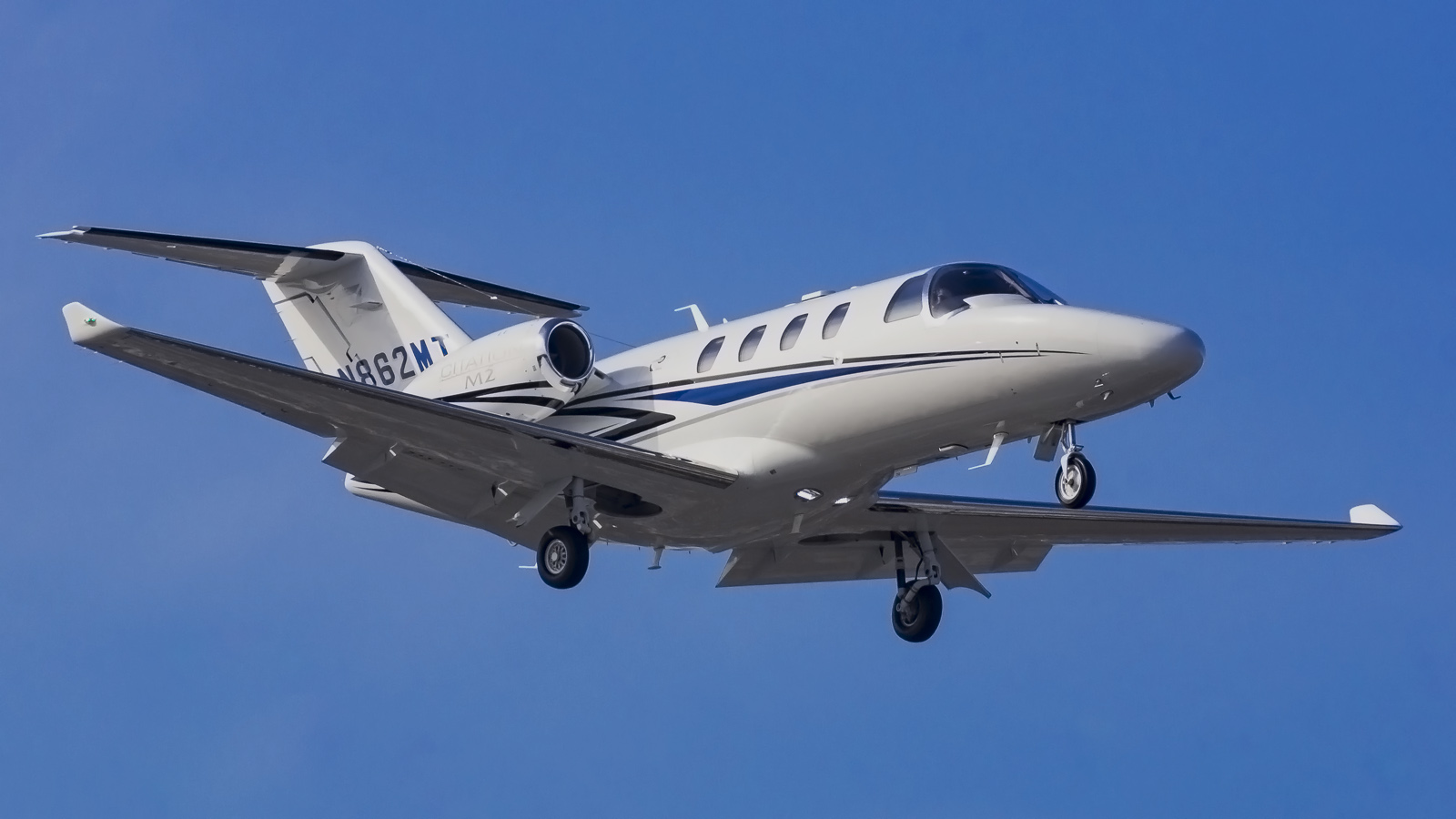
The Citation M2 has small winglets.

=== Model 525 ===
CitationJet
Model 525 serial numbers 0001 to 0359, powered by Williams FJ44-1A turbofans, are marketed as the CitationJet. With Tamarack winglets, it burns 600 lb (270 kg) of fuel per hour at 342 kn (394 mph; 633 km/h) and flight level (FL)410, rising to 700 lb (320 kg) per hour without winglets at FL380 and 1,020 lb (460 kg) at FL290.

CitationJet CJ1
Model 525 serial numbers 0360 to 0599 are marketed as the CitationJet CJ1 and are powered by the same Williams FJ44-1A. It was improved with a Pro Line 21 avionics suite, and a moderate increase in maximum takeoff weight.

CitationJet CJ1+
Model 525 serial number 0600 and higher are marketed as CitationJet CJ1+ and are powered by Williams FJ44-1AP turbofans. With the same airframe, it has Pro Line 21 avionics package and FADEC engine control. It was certified in 2005.
The GE Honda HF120 engine was announced as a retrofit option for the CJ/CJ1/CJ1+ in 2014.

Citation M2
Model 525s marketed as Cessna Citation M2 are powered by improved FJ44-1AP-21 turbofans offering 10 to 15% more cruise thrust and up to 5% more hot-and-high thrust, and are equipped with modern Garmin G3000 avionics replacing Rockwell Collins Pro Line 21. Launched in September 2011, it is based on the then out-of-production CJ1 variant and features a new cabin layout and a more efficient FJ44 version. The initial M2 prototype first flew on 9 March 2012; it was not a conforming airframe but was testing the Garmin G3000 avionics and Williams FJ44-1AP-21 turbofans while another aircraft was expected to join the certification program in May 2012 to be used for aerodynamics testing. Compared to the CJ1+, it climbs more quickly, offers a more comfortable cabin and is faster by 22 kn (25 mph; 41 km/h) at FL 410. The wing is 4 in (10 cm) wider due to small winglets. The FJ44-1AP-21s TBO can reach 5,000 hours and the aircraft burns 740 lb (340 kg) per hour at 392 knots (451 mph; 726 km/h) TAS, FL 400, ISA+3C conditions and at a weight of 9,646 lb (4,375 kg). At high-speed cruise, it can fly one pilot and four passengers over 1,150 nmi (1,320 mi; 2,130 km) in 2 h 49 min. It climbs to FL 410 in 24 minutes, 27% faster than its closest competitor, where it is 53 kn (61 mph; 98 km/h) faster than the Embraer Phenom 100E. With 150 produced since introduction in 2013, it became Cessna's entry-level jet after the Citation Mustang ended production in May 2017. The 250th M2 was delivered on June 15, 2020. In 2023, its equipped price was $6.15M.

Citation M2 Gen2
An upgraded model of the M2 was unveiled in 2021 as the Citation M2 Gen2. The M2 Gen2 differs from the original M2 in that it is fitted with a restyled premium interior with wireless chargers as well as USB-A and USB-C ports. Cargo space was increased to allow an extra 50 lb (23 kg) of luggage to be carried, and the copilot position was given 3 inches (76 mm) of added legroom. The M2 Gen2 was certified in 2022, with deliveries beginning shortly thereafter. In 2023, Cessna announced that a Garmin autothrottle would be available for the M2 Gen2 starting in mid-2025.

=== Model 525A ===
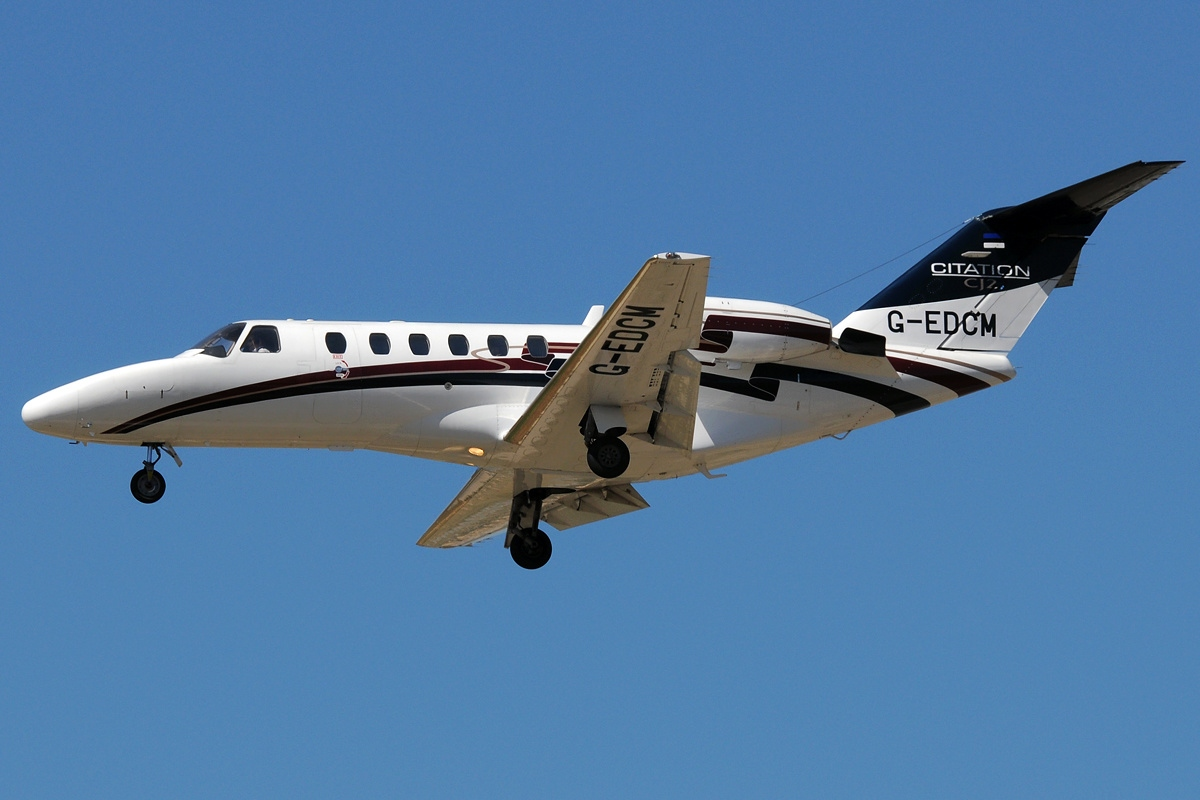
CJ2 side view, six windows

The ICAO aircraft type designator for the CJ2 models is C25A.

CJ2 production ended in January 2016 due to low demand.

CitationJet CJ2

Model 525A serial numbers 0001 to 0299, marketed as the CitationJet CJ2 is a 5 ft (1.5 m) stretch of the CJ1 (Model 525) powered by Williams FJ44-2C turbofans and first delivered in 2000.
CitationJet CJ2+

Model 525A serial numbers 0300 and higher, marketed as the CitationJet CJ2+ and first delivered in April 2006, offer increased performance with updated avionics and Williams FJ44-3A-24 turbofans with FADEC control, with four-passenger NBAA IFR range increased to 1,550 nmi (1,780 mi), maximum cruise speed of 413 knots (475 mph; 765 km/h), and decreased runway requirements; many features such as TCAS and TAWS were made standard. Comparing the Cessna Citation CJ2 and Cessna Citation CJ2+

CitationJet CJ2+ Alpine Edition
In 2014, Cessna started offering an upgrade package for the CJ2+ called Alpine Edition. It incorporates Garmin G3000 avionics and new cabin stylings similar to those introduced by Cessna to the CJ1+ when it became the M2. In 2012, the CJ2+ unit cost US$7.044M.

=== Model 525B ===
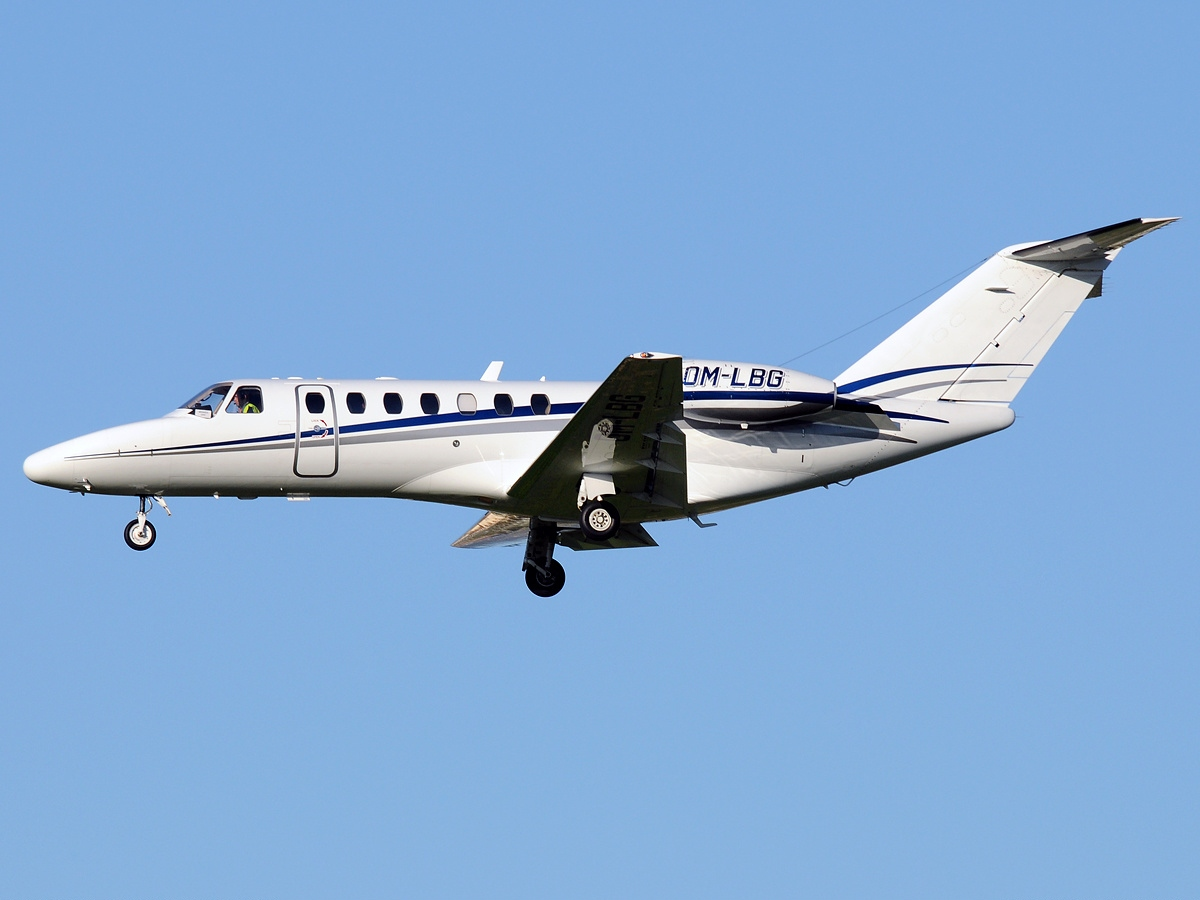
CJ3 side view, seven windows

The ICAO aircraft type designator for the CJ3 models is C25B.

CitationJet CJ3

Model 525B are marketed as the CitationJet CJ3 are a further stretch of the CJ2 powered by Williams FJ44-3A turbofans. Unveiled at the September 2002 National Business Aviation Association convention, it first flew on April 17, 2003, was FAA certified in October 2004 and deliveries began in December of that year. The cockpit with Rockwell Collins avionics is designed for single-pilot operation but can accommodate two crew members. Its customizable cabin typically has six club seats in a center-style configuration with an accessible in flight baggage compartment and external baggage access.
Between its production debut in late 2004 and spring 2018, 500 of CJ3s and CJ3+s were delivered; 2004-2009 models are sold for $3.5 million and $5.0-5.5 million for 2009-2014 models.
CJ3 can cruise at its Mach 0.737 (486 mph; 423 kn; 783 km/h) MMo at FL450 over 1,900 nmi (3,500 km; 2,200 mi) with four passengers, or more than 2,000 nmi (3,700 km; 2,300 mi) at a slower speed, exceeding Textron predictions.
Hourly, CJ3 burns 165 US gal (620 L), its engine maintenance cost $313.60, its parts $251.72 and labor cost is $298.

CitationJet CJ3+

The CitationJet CJ3+ is an upgraded version of the CJ3. The aircraft received FAA certification in 2014. The flight deck of CJ3+ is upgraded to use Garmin G3000 avionics, and its cabin has M2-style seats with foldable armrests. In 2023, its equipped price was $10.415M.

Citation CJ3 Gen2

In October 2025, Cessna announced that the Citation CJ3 Gen2 has received its FAA type certificate. The CJ3 Gen2 features a range of enhancements including improved avionics, a fully customizable cabin, an additional 4.5 inches (110 mm) of cockpit legroom, and a Garmin autothrottle.

=== Model 525C ===
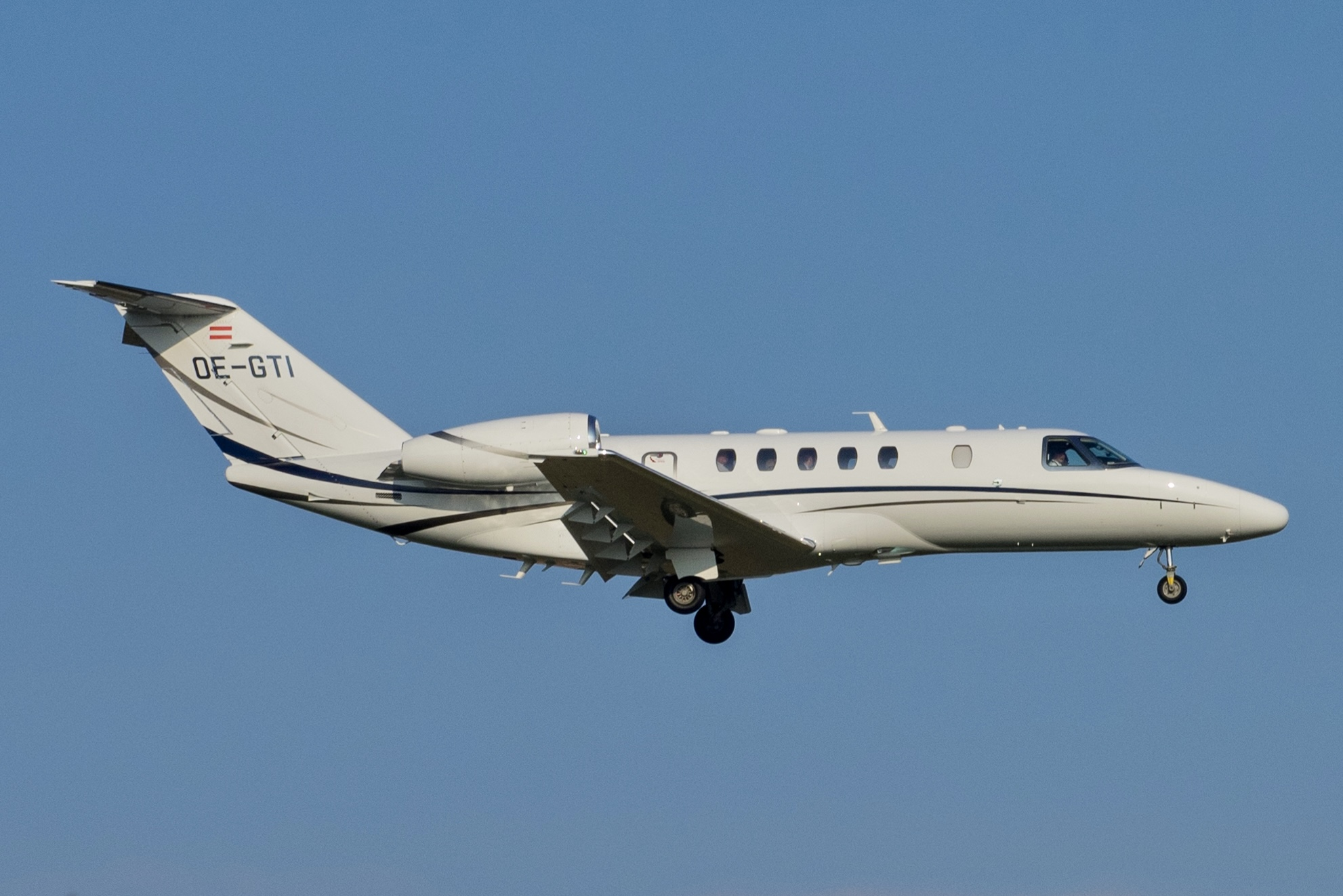
The longest CitationJet, the CJ4, has 5+1 starboard windows.

The ICAO aircraft type designator for the CJ4 models is C25C.

Cessna Citation CJ4

The stretched CJ4 was launched at the October 2006 NBAA conference. Its wing design comes from the moderately swept wing of the Citation Sovereign. Powered by Williams FJ44-4A turbofans, it has a maximum range of 2,165 nmi (4,010 km / 2,491 mi). Its cabin is 21 inches (530 mm) longer than the CJ3 and can seat up to nine people plus one in the cockpit. It first lifted off on May 5, 2008, from McConnell Air Force Base in Wichita, Kansas and first deliveries started in 2010.

In 2011, the Federal Aviation Administration temporarily grounded the CJ4 and issued an airworthiness directive because of fires in the original Lithium-ion battery equipment.
The cabin is pressurized at 9.0 psi (0.62 bar) and the seating area is 7 in (18 cm) longer than in the CJ3, with a typical forward side-facing divan followed by a four chairs club and two forward facing chairs.
It can carry a 987 lb (448 kg) payload with full fuel, cruise up to FL450 and takeoff from 3,410 ft (1,040 m) field on a standard day.
Block speeds are 410–420 kn (470–480 mph; 760–780 km/h) and it burns 160 US gal (610 L) of fuel per hour.
Maintenance is $269 per hour for labor and $370 per hour for parts excluding the engine maintenance plan is $317 per hour for a 5,000-hour TBO.
By June 2019, early models are $5.5-5.8 million for resale and up to over $7 million for later ones.
Compared to the CJ4, the CJ3+ offers almost as much range, but carries fewer passengers with full tanks and is slower, while the Embraer Phenom 300 has better fuel efficiency and more tanks-full payload.
The 400th CJ4 was delivered in April 2023. In 2023, its equipped price was $11.855M.

Citation CJ4 Gen2

Model 525C serial numbers 0346 onward, marketed as the Citation CJ4 Gen2 entered service in March 2021 and features similar interior, avionics, and autothrottle upgrades as the M2 Gen2 and CJ3 Gen2.

== Accidents and incidents ==
- On October 8, 2001, in the 2001 Linate Airport runway collision, a CitationJet 525A CJ2, aircraft registration D-IEVX, attempted to taxi across runway 36R at Linate Airport in Milan in low visibility as a McDonnell Douglas MD-87 of Scandinavian Airlines, SE-DMA, operating as Flight 686 to Copenhagen Airport, was taking off from the runway. The two aircraft collided and caught fire, killing all four people on board the CitationJet, all 110 on the MD-87, and four in a baggage handling building struck by the MD-87 after the collision.

== Specifications ==
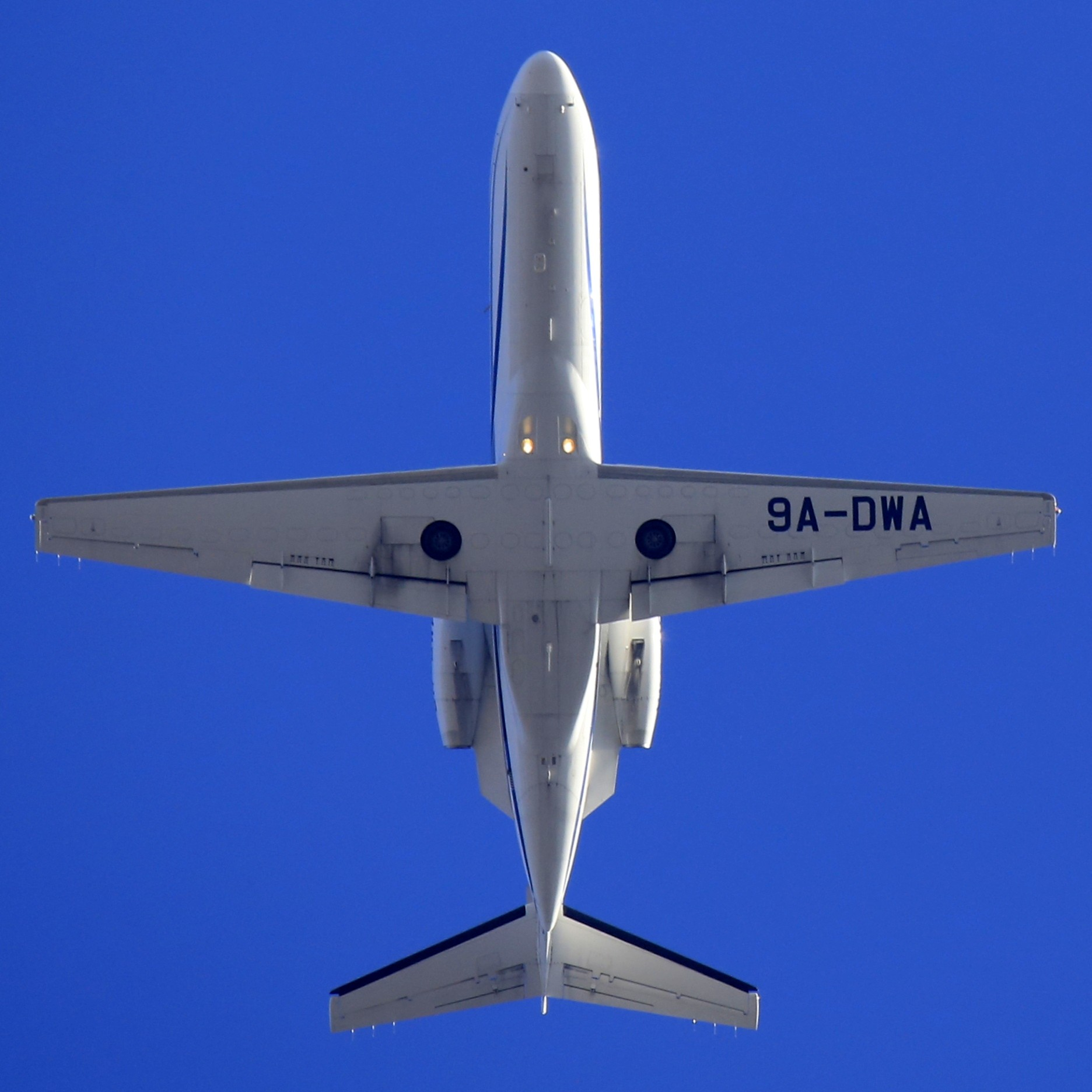
CJ2 planform view, showing its straight wing and uncovered main wheels

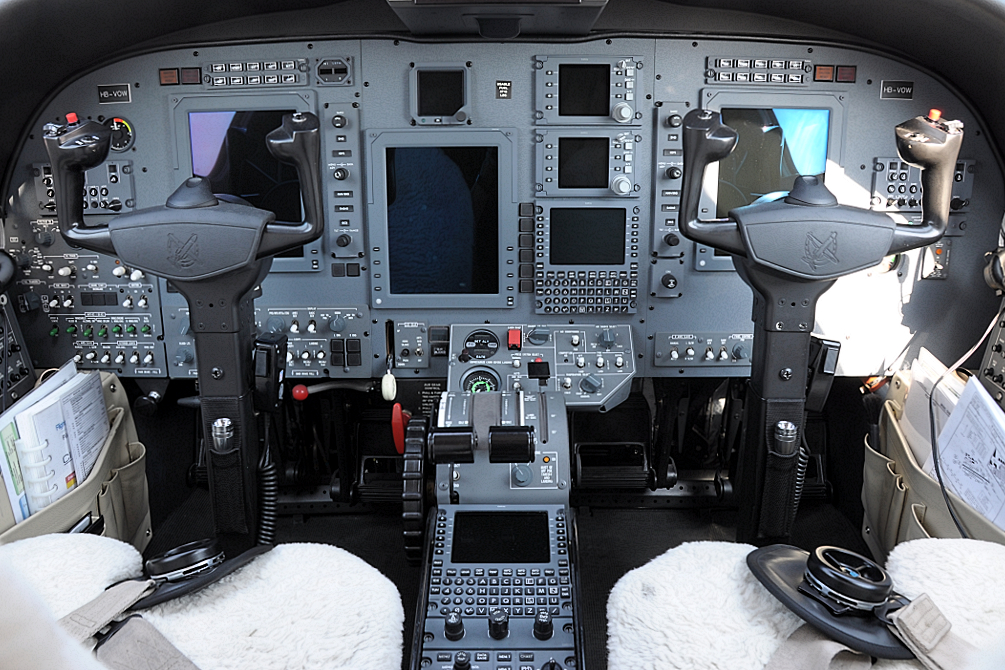
Cockpit of a CJ3 fitted with Rockwell Collins Proline 21 avionics

Model	M2 (CJ1)	CJ2+	CJ3+	CJ4
Crew	1 or 2			
Max. passengers	7	9	9	10
Length	42 ft 7 in (12.98 m)	47 ft 8 in (14.53 m)	51 ft 2 in (15.59 m)	53 ft 4 in (16.26 m)
Height	13 ft 11 in (4.24 m)	14 ft (4.27 m)	15 ft 2 in (4.62 m)	15 ft 5 in (4.69 m)
Wingspan	47 ft 3 in (14.40 m)	49 ft 10 in (15.19 m)	53 ft 4 in (16.26 m)	50 ft 10 in (15.49 m)
Wing area	240 ft^{2} (22.3 m^{2})	264 ft^{2} (25 m^{2})	294 ft^{2} (27.32 m^{2})	330 ft^{2} (30.66 m^{2})
Wing sweep	0 degrees			12.5 degrees
Cabin section	57 in (1.45 m) height, 58 in (1.47 m) width			
Cabin length	11 ft (3.35 m)	13 ft 7 in (4.14 m)	15 ft 8 in (4.78 m)	17 ft 4 in (5.28 m)
MTOW	10,700 lb (4,853 kg)	12,500 lb (5,670 kg)	13,870 lb (6,291 kg)	17,110 lb (7,761 kg)
Fuel capacity	3,296 lb (1,495 kg)	3,930 lb (1,783 kg)	4,710 lb (2,136 kg)	5,828 lb (2,644 kg)
Fuel volume	492 gal (1,862 L)	587 gal (2,221 L)	703 gal (2,661 L)	870 gal (3,293 L)
Basic OEW	6,990 lb (3,171 kg)	8,030 lb (3,642 kg)	8,540 lb (3,874 kg)	10,280 lb (4,663 kg)
Max. payload	1,410 lb (640 kg)	1,670 lb (757 kg)	1,970 lb (894 kg)	2,220 lb (1,007 kg)
Turbofan × 2	FJ44-1AP-21	FJ44-3A-24	FJ44-3A	FJ44-4A
Thrust (each)	1,965 lb (8.74 kN)	2,490 lb (11.08 kN)	2,820 lb (12.54 kN)	3,621 lb (16.11 kN)
Max. cruise	404 kn (748 km/h)	418 kn (774 km/h)	416 kn (770 km/h)	451 kn (835 km/h)
Max. range	1,550 nmi (2,871 km)	1,781 nmi (3,298 km)	2,040 nmi (3,778 km)	2,165 nmi (4,010 km)
Takeoff	3,210 ft (978 m)	3,360 ft (1,024 m)	3,180 ft (969 m)	3,410 ft (1,039 m)
Landing	2,590 ft (789 m)	2,980 ft (908 m)	2,770 ft (844 m)	2,940 ft (896 m)
Ceiling	41,000 ft (12,497 m)	45,000 ft (13,716 m)		
Max. climb rate	3,698 fpm (18.8 m/s)	4,120 fpm (20.9 m/s)	4,478 fpm (22.75 m/s)	3,854 fpm (19.6 m/s)

== See also ==
- Very light jet

Related development

- Cessna 526 CitationJet
- Cessna Citation series

Aircraft of comparable role, configuration, and era

- Embraer Phenom 100
- HondaJet
- SyberJet SJ30i
- Pilatus PC-24
- Embraer Phenom 300
- Learjet 70/75

Related lists

- List of very light jets
