= Aviation call sign =

Unique aircraft identifiers

An aviation call sign or aircraft call sign is a communication call sign assigned as a unique identifier referring to an aircraft.

Call signs in aviation are derived from several different policies, depending upon the type of flight operation and whether or not the caller is in an aircraft or at a ground facility. In most countries, unscheduled general aviation flights identify themselves using the call sign corresponding to the aircraft's registration number (also called N-number in the U.S., or tail number). In this case, the call sign is spoken using the International Civil Aviation Organization (ICAO) phonetic alphabet. Aircraft registration numbers internationally follow the pattern of a country prefix, followed by a unique identifier made up of letters and numbers. For example, an aircraft registered as N978CP conducting a general aviation flight would use the call sign November-niner-seven-eight-Charlie-Papa. However, in the United States a pilot of an aircraft would normally omit to say November, and instead use the name of the aircraft manufacturer or the specific model. At times, general aviation pilots might omit additional preceding numbers and use only the last three numbers and letters. This is especially true at uncontrolled fields (those without control towers) when reporting traffic pattern positions, or at towered airports after establishing two-way communication with the tower controller. For example, Skyhawk eight-Charlie-Papa left base (see below).

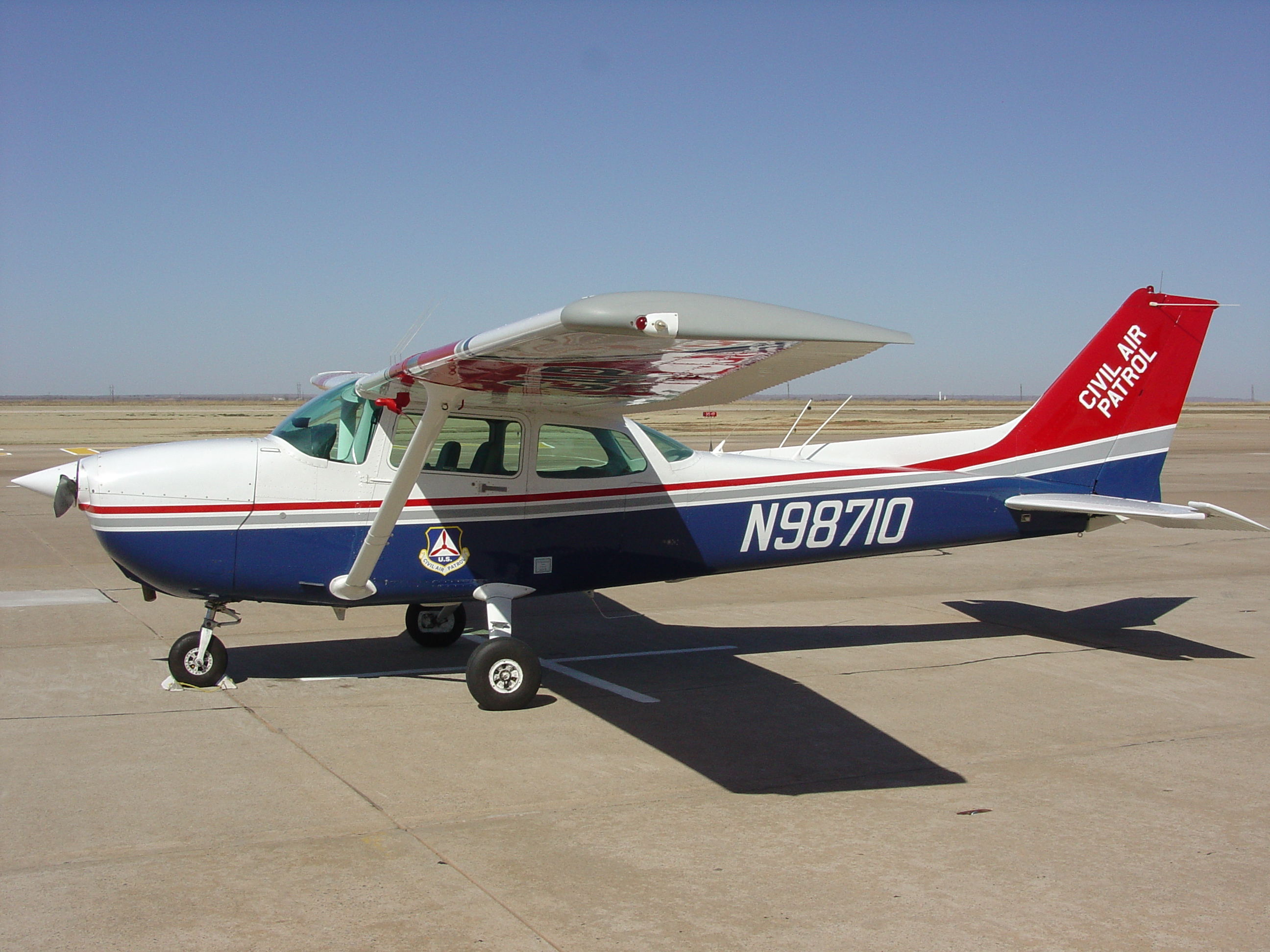
A general aviation aircraft in the United States with its FAA civilian registration number (N98710), which also doubles as its call sign, displayed on the fuselage. However, since this is a Civil Air Patrol aircraft, it will generally be identified by CAPxxxx, based on the state from which it hails.

== International ==
In most countries, the aircraft call sign or "tail number"/"tail letters" (also known as registration marks) are linked to the international radio call sign allocation table and follow a convention that aircraft radio stations (and, by extension, the aircraft itself) receive call signs consisting of five letters. For example, all British civil aircraft have a five-letter call sign beginning with the letter G. Canadian aircraft have a call sign beginning with C–F or C–G, such as C–FABC. Ground-effect vehicles (hovercraft) in Canada are eligible to receive C–Hxxx call signs, and ultralight aircraft receive C-Ixxx call signs. In days gone by, even American aircraft used five letter call signs, such as KH–ABC, but they were replaced prior to World War II by the current American system of civilian aircraft call signs (see below).

The dash ("-") in the registration is only included on the fuselage of the airplane for readability. In air traffic management systems (ATC radar screen, flow management systems, etc.) and on flight plan forms, the dash is not used (e.g. PHVHA, FABCD, CFABC).

After an aircraft has made contact with an air traffic control facility, the call sign may be abbreviated. Sometimes the aircraft make or model is used in front of the full or abbreviated call sign, for instance, the American aircraft mentioned above might then use Cessna Eight-Charlie-Papa. Alternatively, the initial letter of the call sign can be concatenated with the final two or three characters, for instance a British aircraft registered G–BFRM may identify as Golf–Romeo–Mike while the American aircraft might use November–Eight-Charlie-Papa. The use of abbreviated call signs has its dangers, in the case when aircraft with similar call signs are in the same vicinity. Therefore, abbreviated signs are used only so long as it is unambiguous.

== Commercial airline ==
Commercial operators, including scheduled airline, air cargo and air taxi operators, will usually use an ICAO or FAA-registered call sign for their company. By ICAO Annex 10 Chapter 5.2.1.7.2.1 - Full call signs type C, a call sign consists of the telephony designator of the aircraft operating agency, followed by the flight identification. The flight identification is very often the same as the flight number, but could be different to avoid call sign confusion, if two or more flights close to each other have similar flight numbers (e.g. KLM649 and KLM645 or BAW466 and BAW646). For example, British Airways flight 75 would use the call sign Speedbird Seven–Five, since Speed-bird is the telephony designator for British Airways and 75 would be the flight identification. (The telephony designator is not the same as the call sign, although the two are sometimes conflated.) Pan Am had the telephony designator of Clipper (see list).

For these call signs, proper usage varies by country. In some countries, such as the United States, numbers are spoken normally (for the example above, Speed-bird Seventy-five) instead of being spelled out digit by digit, leading to the possibility of confusion. In most other countries, including the United Kingdom, they are spelled out. Air taxi operators in the United States sometimes do not have a registered call sign, in which case the prefix T is used, followed by the aircraft registration number (e.g., Tango-November-Niner-Seven-Eight-Charlie-Papa).

Some variations of call signs exist to express safety concerns to all operators and controllers monitoring the transmissions. Aircraft call signs include the suffix "heavy" for heavy aircraft to indicate an aircraft that generates significant wake turbulence, e.g., United Two-Five Heavy. All aircraft capable of operating with a gross takeoff weight of more than 136 tonnes (300,000 lb) must use this suffix whether or not they are operating at this weight during a particular phase of flight. These are typically Boeing 707, Boeing 747, Boeing 767, Boeing 777, Boeing 787, Airbus A300, Airbus A310, Airbus A330, Airbus A340, Airbus A350, DC-10, MD-11, and Lockheed L-1011 aircraft. Although the Boeing 757's MTOW is less than 136 tons, it is categorized as a heavy aircraft because it generates strong wake turbulence. The suffix "super" is used for an Airbus A380, and was also used for the Antonov An-225 (destroyed in 2022).

For air ambulance services or other flights involving the safety of life (such as aircraft carrying a person who has suffered a heart attack), "Medevac" is prefixed to the call sign. For flights in which life is not in direct danger (such as transporting organs for transplant), the call sign prefix "Pan-Pan-Medical" is used before the normal call sign, e.g. Pan-Pan-Medical Three-Three-Alpha, Pan-Pan-Medical Northwest Four-Five-Eight, or Pan-Pan-Medical Singapore Niner-Two-Three. Pan Pan (pronounced "pahn-pahn") is the voice radio signal for "urgent", while Mayday is the voice radio signal for "distress". The word may be omitted for air ambulance services with assigned call signs, especially when they have notified air traffic control operators that they are on an air ambulance mission at the beginning of their flight and do not change from one controller to another. The Life Flight air ambulance service, for example, might simply identify as Life-Flight Three. An aircraft that has declared an in-flight emergency will sometimes prefix the word Mayday to its call sign.

Australia's Royal Flying Doctors Service (RFDS) uses "FlyDoc" followed by three numbers assigned to the aircraft as their call signs. An example of this is FlyDoc425, which is based in Bundaberg, Queensland, and used as part of their air ambulance services for the State of Queensland.

Formerly, one of the rarest call signs, "Concorde", was used to identify British Airways' Concorde aircraft. The intent of this call sign was to raise the air traffic control operators' awareness of the unique performance of the aircraft and the special attention it required. The call sign was appended to British Airways' normal radio call sign, e.g. "Speedbird-Concorde One". Air France, the only other airline to operate the Concorde commercially, did not use the "Concorde" call sign at all in normal service; its Concorde flights simply used the standard Airfrans call sign.

== Glider ==
Glider pilots often can use any of three different call signs. Since most (not all) gliders now show standard CAA general aviation registrations e.g. G-xxxx they can call using the same call sign and abbreviation rules as other light aircraft. This has long been the case in the United States. Before these registrations came in (between 2004 and 2008), they used to use and normally still do use, either a three letter code issued to all gliders by the British Gliding Association known as the aircraft's Trigraph. For example, XYZ would normally call ATC as "Glider X-ray, Yankee, Zulu", or, if they paid extra, could get from the BGA a numeric or mixed numeric and letter code known as a competition number for marking their aircraft, and as a call sign. For example R4 "Romeo Four", or 26 "Two Six" or F1 "Foxtrot One". Optionally gliders will normally add "Glider" in front of their call sign when calling ATC units so that the controller knows that the glider will be unable to maintain a particular altitude, as Gliders are normally either descending in a straight glide or circling to climb. Some gliders are still not required to carry a CAA General Aviation type registration as they are older designs or prototypes and can therefore only continue to use their Trigraph or Competition number as a call sign. These are known as Annex II aircraft as they are listed in EASA Annex II.

== Military ==
Military flights often use more than one call sign during a flight. Administrative call signs are used with air traffic control facilities similar to those of commercial operators. e.g. Navy Alpha-Golf-Two-Zero-One, Reach-Three-One-Seven-Niner Two.

Tactical call signs are used during tactical portions of a flight, and they often indicate the mission of the flight or an aircraft's position in a formation.

For example, Royal Canadian Air Force 442 Rescue Squadron, based at Comox, British Columbia uses the call sign "Snake 90x" depending on the tail number of the helicopter: 901, 902, etc. When tasked on a search and rescue (SAR) mission, however, the aircraft call sign becomes "Rescue 90x".

== Ground facilities ==
Ground facilities identify themselves by the name and function of the facility: e.g. Seattle Tower for the tower air traffic control operators' position, SoCal Approach for a TRACON, or Boston Center for an area control center. All other ICAO countries around the world, for example the European Joint Aviation Authorities (JAA), use control or radar instead of center in their airspace: (Langen Radar, Brussels Control, Paris Control, etc.). London Centre (center) is the emergency frequency call sign for London Terminal Control TC.

The ICAO 24–bit transponder code is intended for non-human usage in the Mode-S and ADS-B protocols.

== See also ==
- Airline codes
- List of ICAO aircraft type designators
- NATO phonetic alphabet
- Spacecraft call signs
