= Hawker 400 =

Twinjet business aircraft

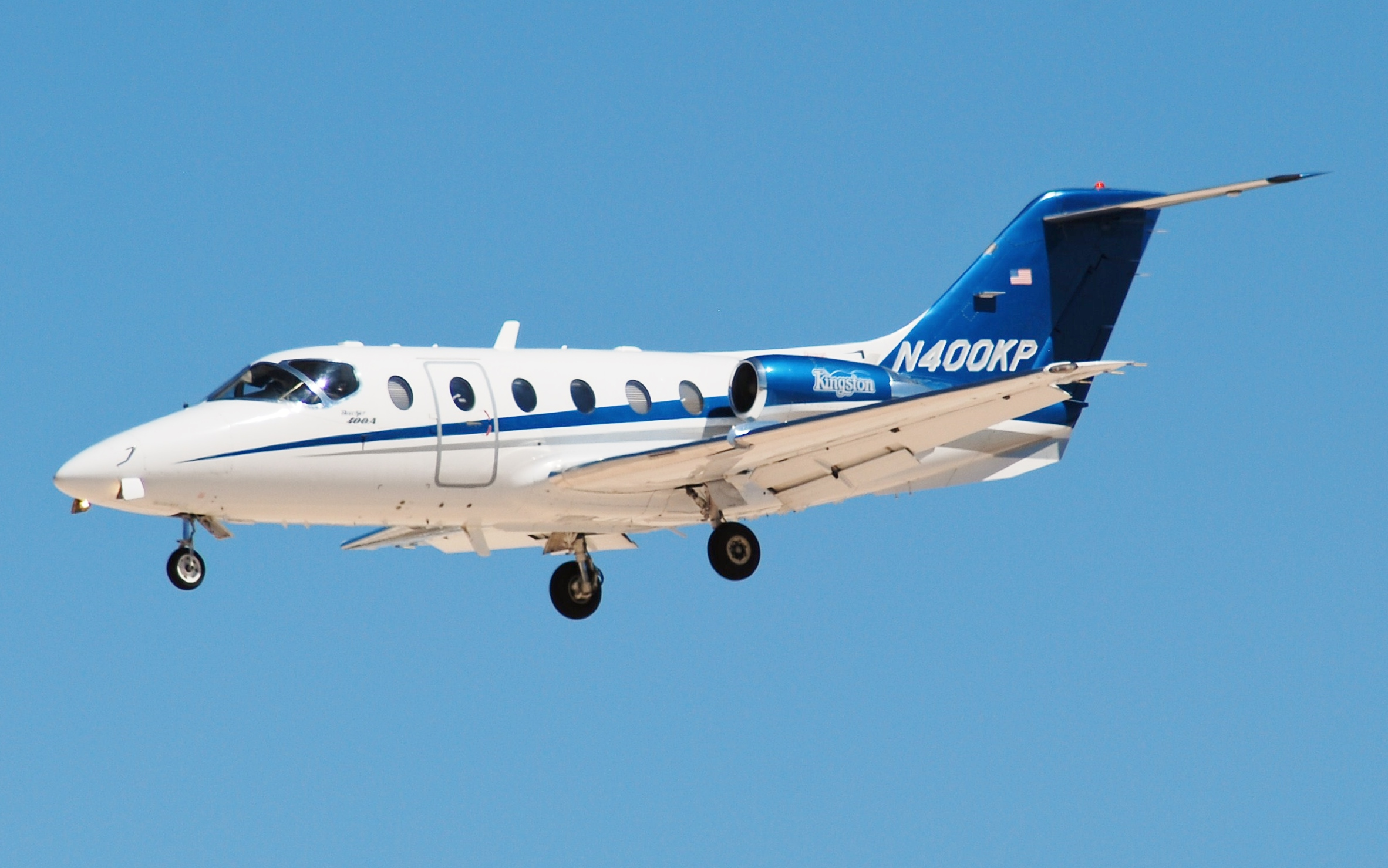
- Hawker 400XP

General information
- Type: Business jet
- National origin: Japan/United States
- Manufacturer: Hawker Beechcraft
- Status: Out of production, in service
- Primary users: Flight Options Travel Management Co.
- Number built: 951: 92 Mitsubishi MU-300, 859 Beechjet 400

History
- Manufactured: 1978–2009
- First flight: August 29, 1978 (as Mitsubishi Diamond)
- Variants: T-1 Jayhawk; Nextant 400XT

The Hawker 400 (also known as the Mitsubishi MU-300 Diamond and Beechjet 400) is a light business jet. Initially designed and produced by the Japanese conglomerate Mitsubishi Heavy Industries, it has been further developed and updated by the American company Beech Aircraft Company, now part of Textron Aviation.

Development was launched by Mitsubishi as the MU-300 Diamond during the 1970s as a jet-powered companion to its existing Mitsubishi MU-2. Performing its maiden flight on August 29, 1978; however, the certification process was protracted due to Federal Aviation Administration (FAA) being more cautious following the loss of American Airlines Flight 191. The Diamond was cleared to enter service in on November 6, 1981. Production proceeded at Mitsubishi's US-based subsidiary. In 1985, Mitsubishi sold the rights to the Diamond II, along with numerous unfinished airframes, to Beechcraft. Adopting the Beechjet 400 naming scheme, production of the type continued into the twenty-first century.

In 2003, Raytheon launched production of the enlarged Hawker 400XP, which could seat up to nine passengers and featured thrust reversers and new avionics. In 2007, Hawker Beechcraft announced a programme to develop an improved model of the aircraft, the Hawker 450XP, although it was cancelled one year later and production of new aircraft ceased entirely shortly thereafter. During the 2010s, both Nextant Aerospace and Hawker launched separate upgrade packages that replace the original powerplant with newer Williams FJ44-3AP engines alongside new avionics and refurbished interiors. The majority of aircraft were flown by civilian operators, a large portion of these being based in North America and Brazil. A militarised trainer variant, the T-1 Jayhawk, was also produced for the United States Air Force.

== Development ==
The aircraft was originally developed as the Mitsubishi MU-300 Diamond by the Japanese conglomerate Mitsubishi Heavy Industries during the 1970s. The programme, which was formally launched in 1977, was greatly influenced by the Mitsubishi MU-2, a civil-oreinted twin-turboprop aircraft that proved to be an export success, to the extent that many MU-2s were sold in the United States and an assembly line was established in San Angelo, Texas. Mitsubishi executives were keen to expand within the general aviation and executive sectors, and thus a jet-powered aircraft appeared to be the next logical step. Early work on the programme proceeded at a relatively rapid pace.

The prototype made its maiden flight on August 29, 1978. A pair of prototypes were produced for flight testing; the manufacturers trials were conducted in Japan, which were largely favourable, although a tendency for the aircraft to 'snake' at high speeds was revealed. Later flight testing was performed in the US as Mitsubishi chose to certify the Diamond in the United States under FAA Part 25 regulations for transport aircraft, but additional requirements introduced by the Federal Aviation Administration (FAA) in the aftermath of the crash of an American Airlines DC-10 airliner at Chicago resulted in significant delays in the certification process. Furthermore, several required changes to the aircraft added 600 lb (270 kg) to its overall weight. On November 6, 1981, the Diamond finally received type certification, clearing it to enter commercial service.

Assembly of production Diamonds was performed at the former Mooney Aircraft Corporation plant at San Angelo (which Mitsubishi had purchased in 1969) using kits supplied from Japan. Deliveries to end users commenced in July 1982. One year later, Mitsubishi announced the Diamond 1A, which was powered by Pratt & Whitney Canada JT15D-4D turbofan engines, had a increased maximum takeoff weight (MTOW) from 14,630 lb to 16,230 lb and improved take-off performance, and was equipped with electronic flight instrument system and an additional port-side window in the cabin. The first Diamond 1A were delivered in January 1984. Later that same year, the Diamond II was launched, which used uprated JT15D-5 engines equipped with thrust reversers and had a reduced MTOW of 15,780 lb accompanied by greater fuel capacity. Mitsubishi ultimately produced 97 Diamonds, all of which were assembled in the US.

In December 1985, Mitsubishi sold the design rights for the Diamond II, along with 64 Mitsubishi-built kits, to Beechcraft. The new owner promptly redesignated the type as the Beechjet 400 and was certified accordingly by the FAA in May 1986. It proceeded to setup its own production line for the aircraft; assembly was performed at Wichita, Kansas. By 1989, no more elements of the aircraft were being supplied by Mitsubishi, its former role having been progressively transferred to various US-based suppliers.

In 1989, Beech introduced the improved Beechjet 400A (later rebranded as the Hawker 400A), which was provided with a Collins Pro Line 4 avionics suite, a redesigned interior for the cabin, and optimized performance during cruise. One year later, the company secured a contract from the United States Air Force (USAF) for the Beech 400T, the service designation being T-1 Jayhawk, which used as a trainer for crew of large aircraft like tankers and strategic transports. The Jayhawk had additional fuel tankage within the fuselage, improved air conditioning, and reinforcement around the leading edge of the wing and windshield; the avionics bay was also related from the nose to the rear fuselage. The Japan Air Self-Defense Force 400T trainer shares the T-1A type certificate.

In 1993, Raytheon purchased the Hawker business jets division from British Aerospace; shortly thereafter, it opted to redesignate the Beechjet 400 as the Hawker 400 to align it with this product range.

In 2003, Raytheon began to produce an enlarged version of the aircraft, the Hawker 400XP, which included: 200 lb (91 kg) gross weight increase, a nine-passenger seating option, thrust reversers, TCAS II, and an emergency locator beacon.

In 2006, Raytheon sold the division, after which the aircraft branded as Hawker Beechcraft. In October 2008, Hawker Beechcraft announced that it was developing an improved model, the Hawker 450XP; it was intended to be powered by newer FADEC-equipped Pratt & Whitney PW535D engines and feature a more luxurious interior along with new avionics. However, the Hawker 450XP was permanently cancelled in June 2009 due to poor economic conditions. In 2009, its unit cost was $7.4 million USD.

Starting in the 2010s, Nextant Aerospace has re-manufactured Hawker 400XP, designated Nextant 400XT; changes include the replacement of the JT15Ds with Williams FJ44-3APs and adding new avionics and interior. It was FAA-certified in October 2011. Up to one-third of the 400A/400XP fleet could be retrofitted, enabling improved range, speed and fuel efficiency. It should keep their resale value to remain in economic service for another twenty to thirty years, akin to the Dassault Falcon 20 being reengined with Garrett TFE731s.

In 2012, Textron performed the maiden flight of the Hawker 400XPR, which improves 4-pax range to 1,950 nmi (3,610 km; 2,240 mi), has better hot and high performance, and can climb to FL450 at max takeoff weight in 19 minutes. The conversion features new avionics, interior, winglets, and Williams FJ44-4A-32 engines. Hawker 400XPR was certified in 2016, and first fully configured Hawker 400XPR was delivered in July 2017; the upgrade can be performed in 12 weeks with a choice of Rockwell Collins Pro Line 4 to 21 or Garmin G5000 avionics.

== Design ==
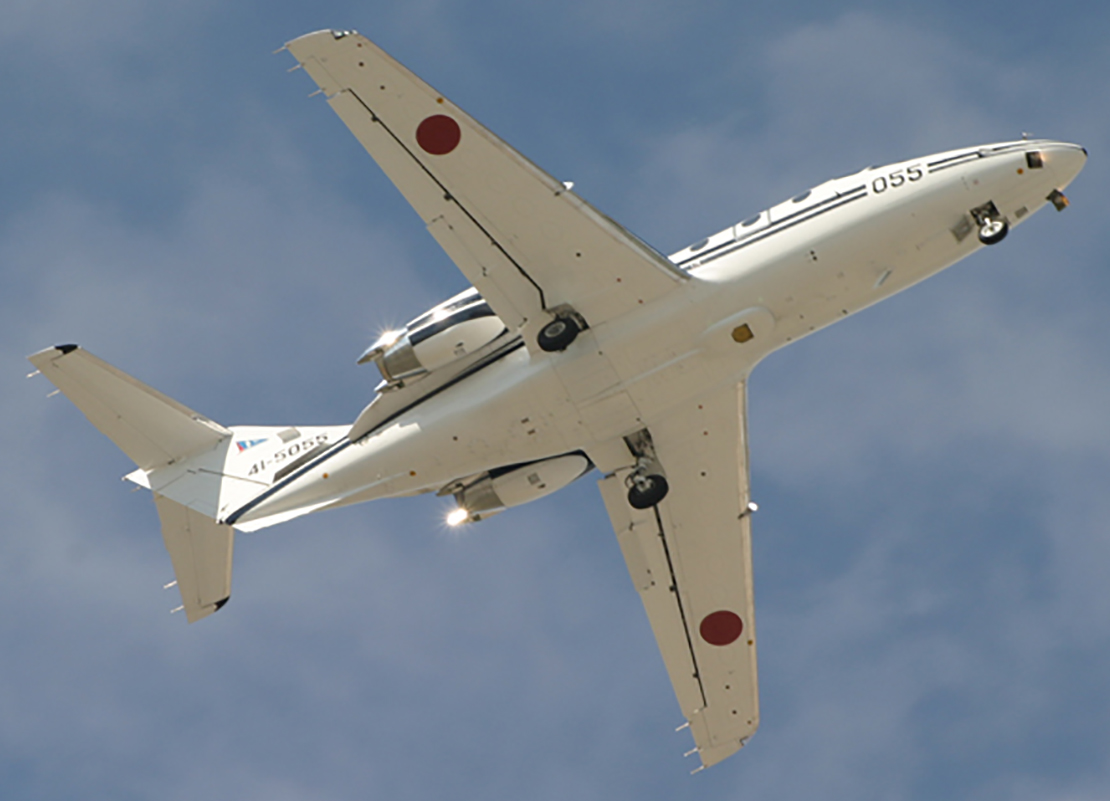
Planform view, showing wing sweep

The Hawker 400 is a compact low-winged business jet that featured a relatively orthodox design. It was furnished with a T-tail that was largely composed of aluminium alloy. Its wings featured a quarter-chord 20-degree sweep angle and was equipped with over-wing spoilers that both controlled roll and provided lift-dumping. Flaps were also present, which were double-slotted inboard and single-slotted outboard, to deliver favourable field performance. The wing featured a computer-designed supercritical airfoil in order to minimise drag.

As originally designed, the Hawker 400 was powered by a pair of Pratt & Whitney Canada JT15D turbofan engines, which are mounted on the rear fuselage and rated to produce 2,500 lb of thrust. It is typically flown by a pair of pilots and accommodates eight passengers in a pressurised cabin. Aft of the passenger cabin was a lavatory along with a small baggage hold. The Hawker 400 can fly 1,351 nmi (2,502 km) with four passengers, cruising at Mach 0.71–0.73, and most pilots are comfortable flying it over three hours, about 1,175 nmi (2,176 km) cruising at Mach 0.73–0.76. Typical missions are 1.5 to 2.0 hours with 400 kn (740 km/h) block speeds. It burns 1,500 lb (680 kg) of fuel the first hour, dropping to 1,100–1,200 lb (500–540 kg) for the second. Basic operating weights range from 11,000 to 11,100 lb (4,990 to 5,030 kg), full tanks payload is less than 500–600 lb (230–270 kg) with an average passenger load of three, however its full capacity is six passengers 1,100 nmi (2,000 km). On most variants, the avionics were housed within a bay in the nose, although this was relocated to the rear fuselage on some models.

== Operational history ==
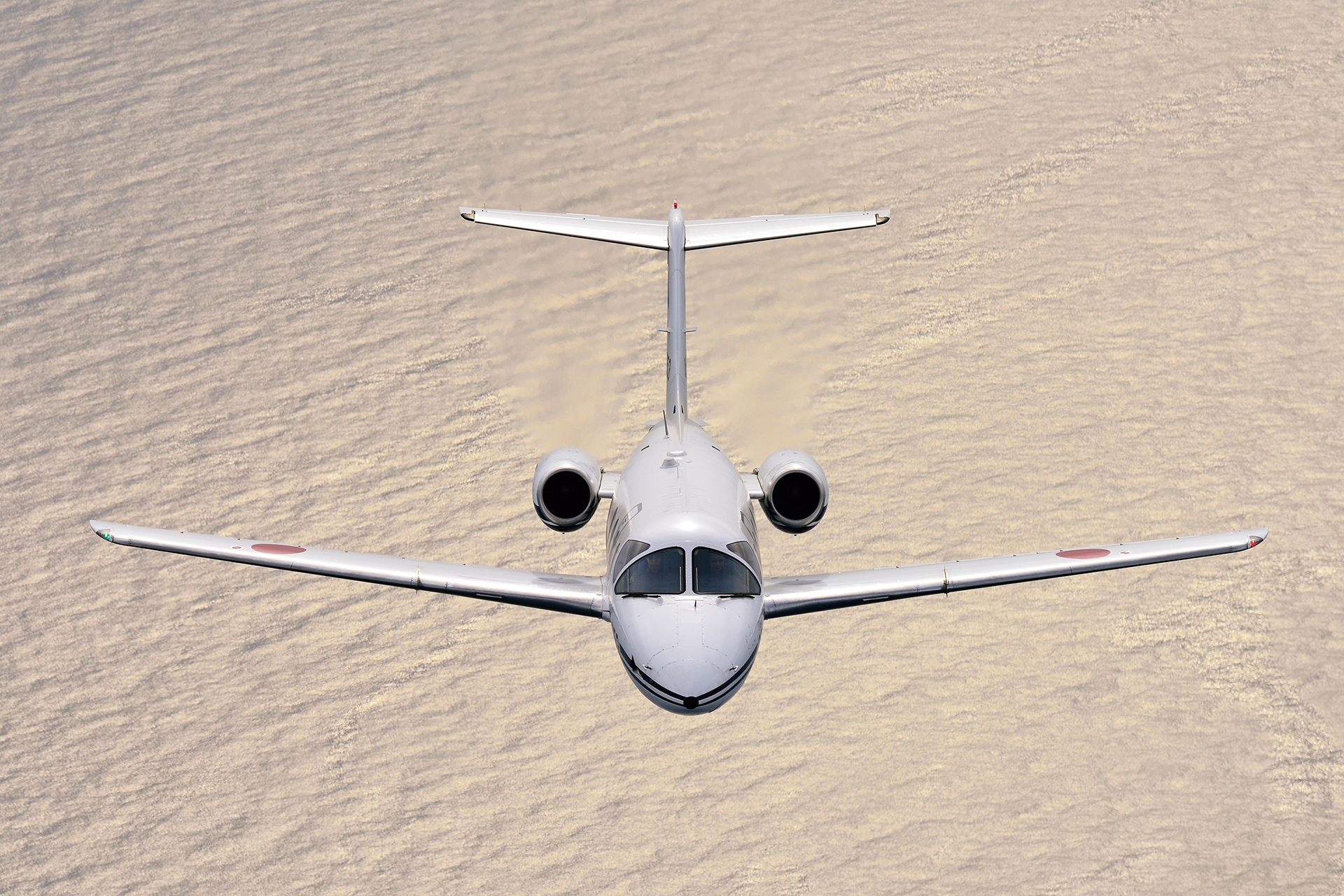
Front view, showing its T-tail

The type is used by many corporate and private users, it is also used by air-taxi and air charter companies.

In 2014, most were U.S. registered, a majority with single aircraft operators. Flight Options and Travel management co. were its largest operators as NetJets Europe has disposed of its fleet. The second highest concentration was in Mexico, then Brazil, the rest were scattered throughout the world.

Military applications for the type have included training, maritime patrol, search and rescue operations, drug interdiction, and liaison. The USAF operated 178 T-1A Jayhawks.

Charter and fractional operators fly at least 800 to 900 hours per year while most corporate operators fly 300 to 400 hours.

== Variants ==
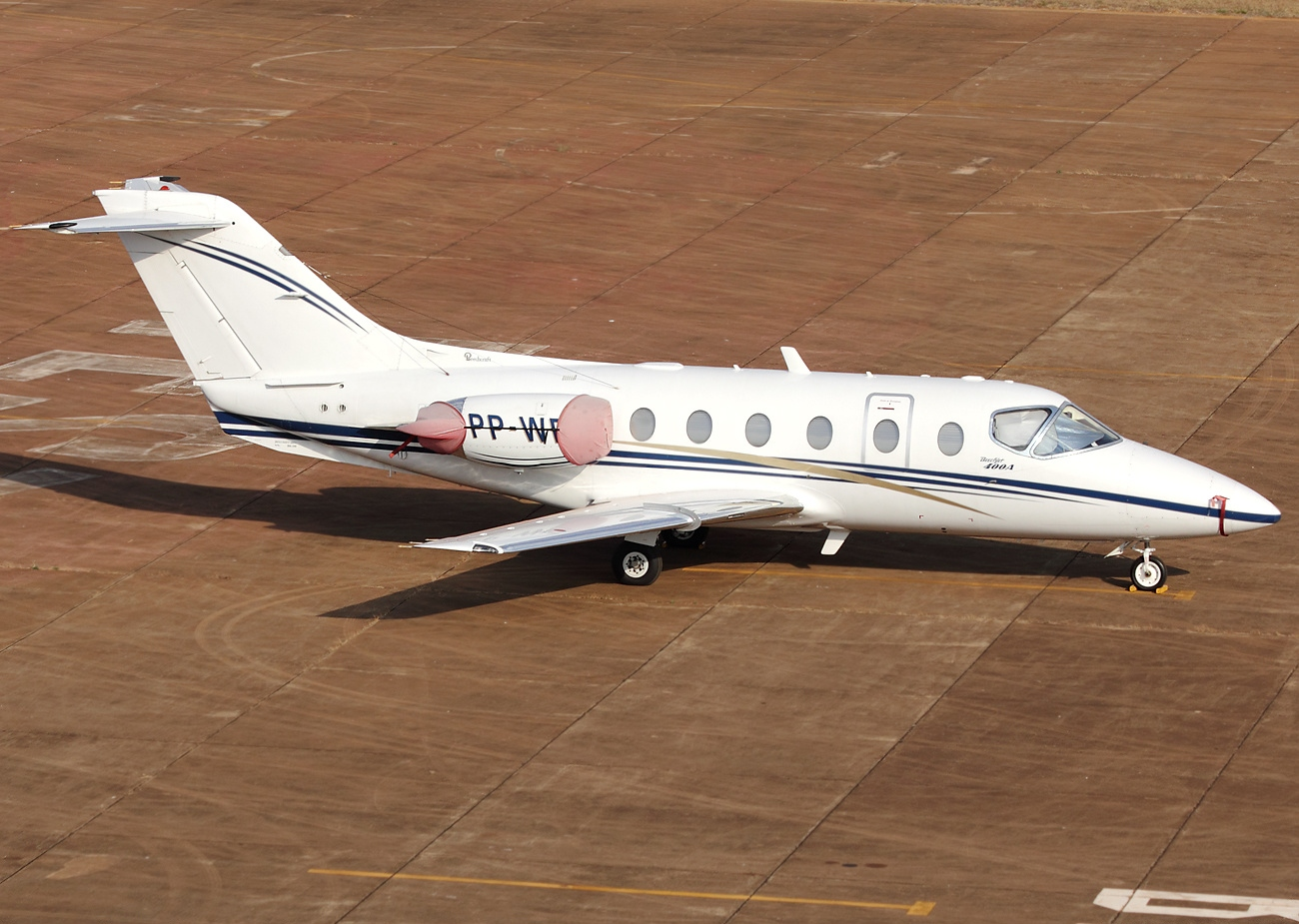
Beechjet 400A on ramp

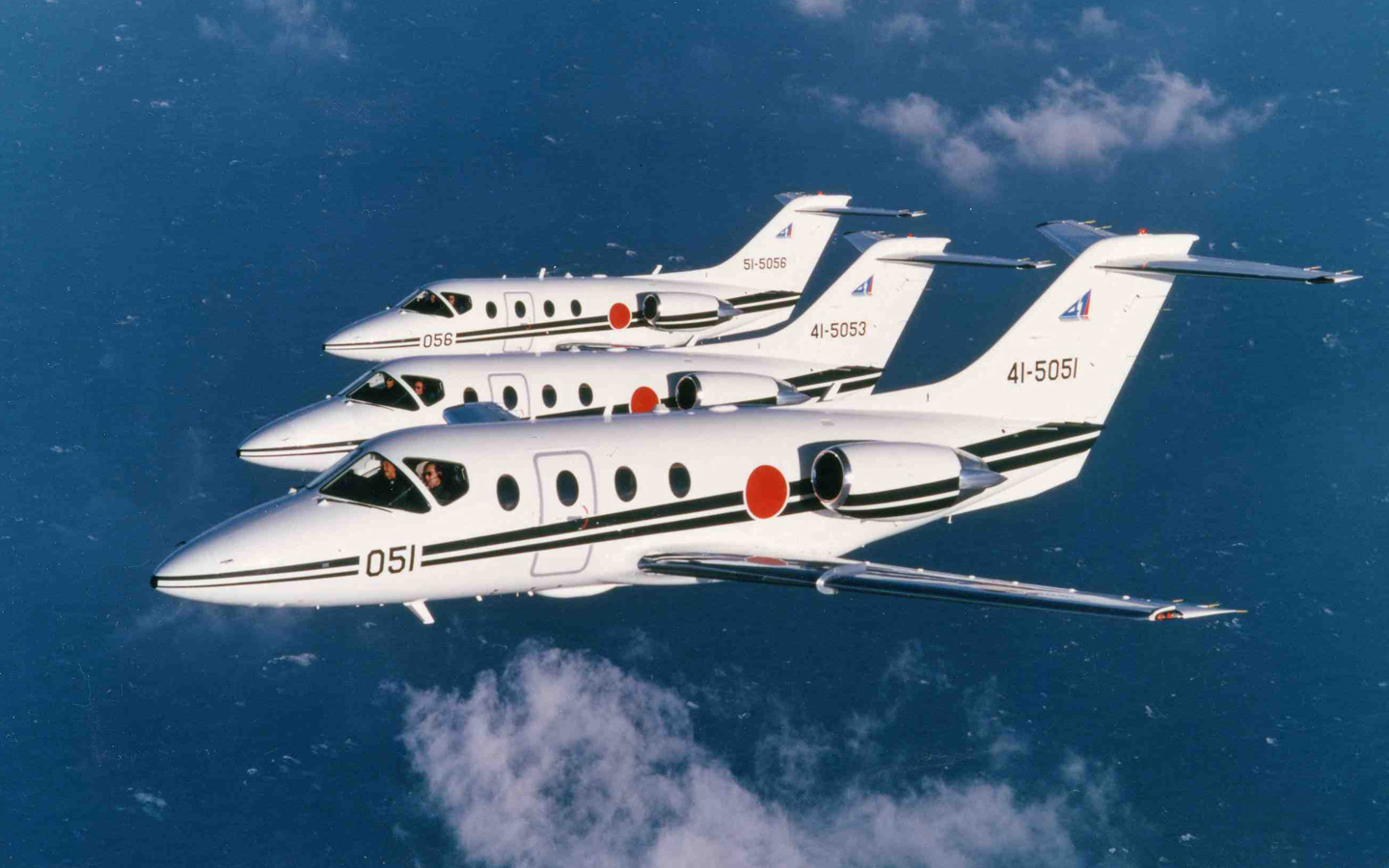
JASDF T-400 in flight formation

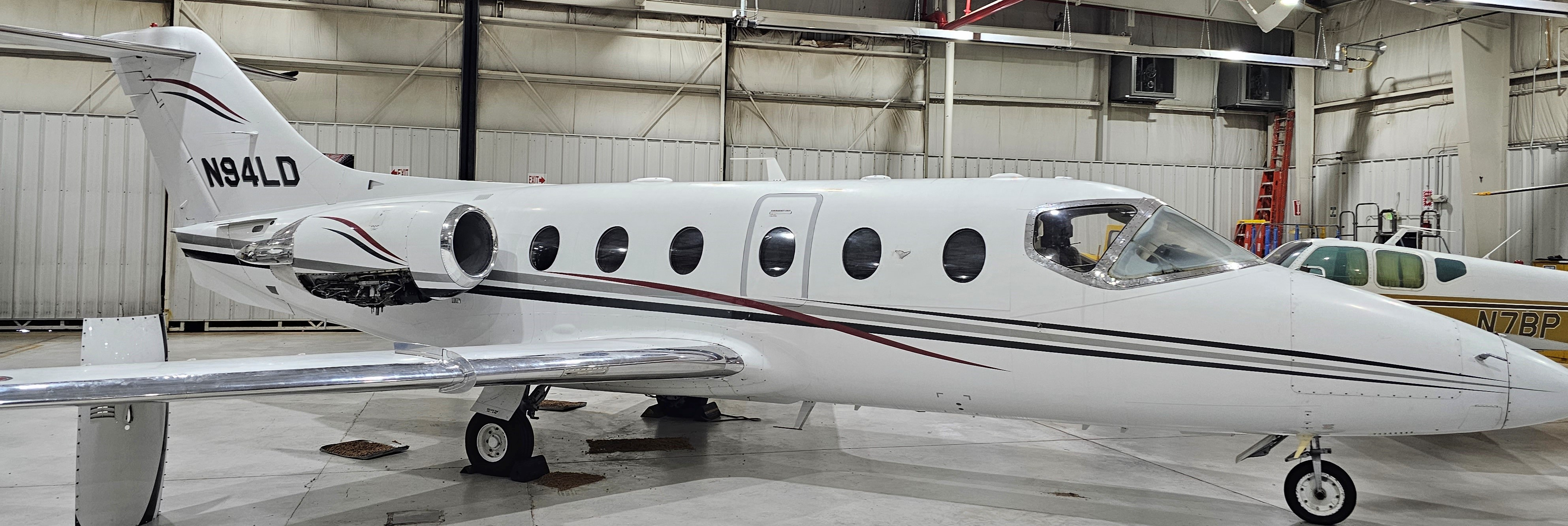
MU-300 Diamond 1

Mitsubishi MU-300 Diamond I
Initial model, ICAO designator MU30. Two prototypes and 89 production aircraft built, 56 in active use as of 2014.

Mitsubishi MU-300-10 Diamond II
Improved version of Diamond I; 11 built, all subsequently redesignated as Beechjet 400s.

Beechcraft Model 400 Beechjet
The Diamond II built after Beechcraft bought the MU-300 production rights from Mitsubishi. 54 built in addition to the original 11 Diamond IIs. ICAO designator BE40.

Model 400A
Upgraded model, initially produced as the Beechcraft Beechjet 400A, then Raytheon Beechjet 400A, then Raytheon Hawker 400XP, then Hawker Beechcraft Hawker 400XP. One prototype converted from Model 400 and 593 built as of the end of 2009. ICAO designator BE40.

Model 400T
Military version of the Model 400A, 180 built for the United States Air Force as the T-1 Jayhawk and 13 built for the Japan Air Self-Defense Force. In Japanese service, they are referred to as T-400. ICAO designator BE40.

Hawker 400XPR
A factory engineered and supported upgrade of Hawker 400XP, first flown May 2012, and certified in 2016. The conversion features new avionics, interior, winglets, and Williams FJ44-4A-32 engines. The upgrade can be performed in 12 weeks with a choice of Rockwell Collins Pro Line 4 to 21 or Garmin G5000 avionics. Hawker 400XPR increases ferry range to 2160nmi, provides better hot and high performance, and 16-20% decrease in specific fuel consumption. 400XPR has ICAO designator BE4W, which is shared with Nextant 400XT, a competing upgrade of Hawker 400 made by Nextant Aerospace.

== Specifications (Hawker 400XPR) ==
Data from Brassey's World Aircraft & Systems Directory 1999/2000, Hawker 400XPR Product Analysis

General characteristics

- Crew: 2 pilots
- Capacity: 7–9 passengers, 5,600 lb (2,500 kg) useful load
- Length: 48 ft 5 in (14.76 m)
- Wingspan: 43 ft 10 in (13.36 m)
- Height: 13 ft 11 in (4.24 m)
- Empty weight: 10,500 lb (4,763 kg)
- Max takeoff weight: 16,300 lb (7,394 kg)
- Pressurization: 9.1 psi (0.63 bar)
- Cabin height: 4.75 ft (1.45 m)
- Cabin width: 4.92 ft (1.50 m)
- Powerplant: 2 × Williams International FJ44-4A-32 turbofan, 3,200 lbf (14 kN) thrust each

Performance

- Maximum speed: 468 kn (539 mph, 866 km/h) (Mach 0.78 M_{MO})
- Cruise speed: 447 kn (514 mph, 828 km/h) High Speed Cruise, at FL450
- Stall speed: 92 kn (106 mph, 171 km/h) (full flaps)
- Range: 2,160 nmi (2,490 mi, 4,000 km) at 45,000 ft (13,700 m)
- Service ceiling: 45,000 ft (13,700 m)
- Fuel burn at high-speed cruise: 913 lb/h (414 kg/h) at 447 kn TAS at FL450
- Fuel burn at long-range cruise: 761 lb/h (345 kg/h) at 425 kn TAS at FL450

== See also ==
Related development

- T-1 Jayhawk
- Nextant 400XT

Aircraft of comparable role, configuration, and era

- Beechcraft Premier I
- Cessna Citation II/V
- Cessna CitationJet CJ3/CJ4
- Dassault Falcon 10
- Embraer Phenom 300
- Learjet 25/31/35

Related lists

- List of civil aircraft
