= Call name =

Call name may refer to:

- Call sign, a unique designation for a transmitter station
- Military call sign, a nickname if a person in military communucations
- In dog breeding, "call name" is a casual name for the animal, as distinguished from the registered name

== See also ==
- Call by name, an evaluation strategy used in computer programming
