= Husker =

Husker may refer to:

- A Nebraska resident.
- A University of Nebraska–Lincoln student, particularly representing the institution in athletics as a "Cornhusker".
- William Adama's callsign in the reimagined Battlestar Galactica television series.
- Hüsker Dü, American hardcore punk/alternative rock band.
- Husker, a fictional character in the television series Hazbin Hotel.
