= Nextant Aerospace =

American aircraft remanufacturer

- Website: nextantaerospace.com

Nextant Aerospace is a United States–based company specializing in the remanufacturing of business jets. Founded in 2007, Nextant is the first company to introduce the concept of aircraft remanufacturing to the business jet market.

== Nextant 400XT ==
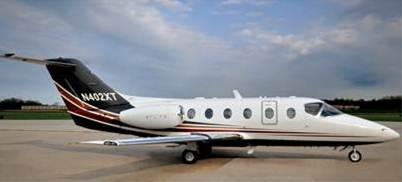
Nextant 400XT Exterior.

The company's first product is the Nextant 400XT, a modified and modernized Beechjet 400A/XP that sells for approximately one-half the price of competing models with comparable features and specifications.

The 400XT is equipped with 3,050-pound-thrust Williams FJ44-3AP Full Authority Digital Engine Controls (FADEC) turbofan engines and a Rockwell Collins Pro Line 21™ integrated avionics suite. It also has multiple aerodynamic and airframe enhancements including a streamlined, conically lofted engine cowling along with a newly designed engine beam and mounting system that is significantly stronger when compared to the original installation.

The aircraft offers options such as several alternative seating configurations, a Rockwell Collins Venue cabin management system, entertainment equipment, LED lighting and Internet and satellite phone access.

The aircraft has a 460 knot (850 kilometers per hour) cruising speed and a National Business Aviation Association (NBAA) IFR range of 2,005 nautical miles (3,713 kilometers) with four passengers. Compared to the Beechcraft 400A, the upgrade increases range by 50 percent, improves fuel efficiency by 32 percent, reduces climb times by one-third and reduces operating costs by 29 percent. Noise compliance exceeds Stage IV requirements.

The 400XT made its first test flight in March 2010. Receipt of final certification from the Federal Aviation Administration (FAA) was announced in October 2011. Deliveries of the Nextant 400XT began that same month, with initial deliveries of a 40-aircraft, $150 million order to private aviation company Flight Options LLC.

An upgraded version of the aircraft, the Nextant 400XTi, was introduced in 2014. It now competes with an official modification called Hawker 400XPR, produced by Textron in collaboration with Sierra Industries.

At the October 2018 NBAA convention, Nextant introduced a baseline, $4.5 million 400XTe version to be delivered from 2019 for charter and utility operators, with a three-screen rather than a four-screen layout flight deck and without the VIP interior of the $5.4 million XTi, but an optional high-density seating for up to nine passengers.

In 2017, Textron Aviation delivered first Hawker 400XPR, a factory-engineered and supported upgrade to 400XP which competes with Nextant 400XT.

=== Remanufacturing process ===
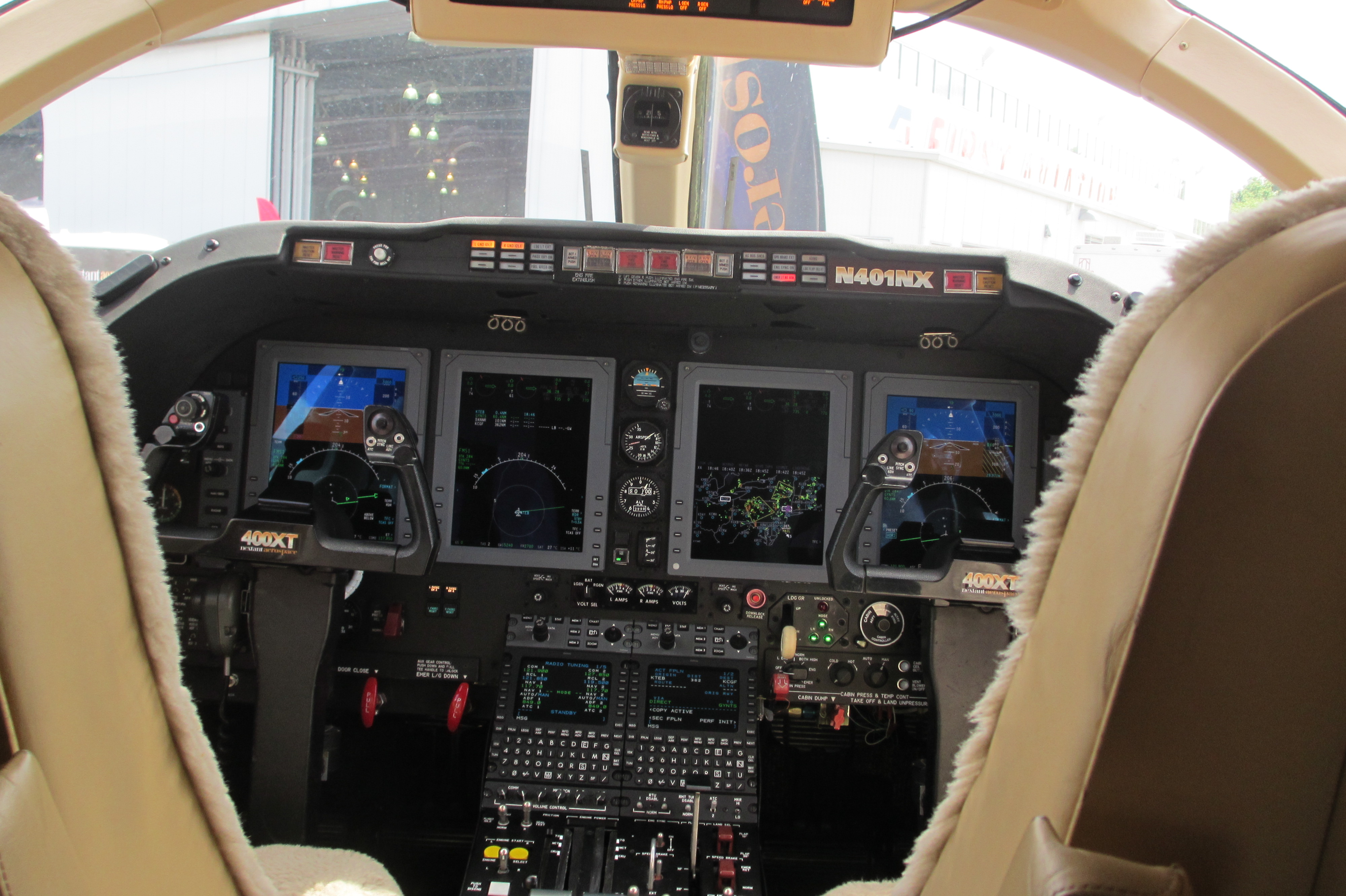
New cockpit

Nextant's aircraft remanufacturing program is distinguished from ones focused on the refurbishment or replacement of engines or other components by a factory-based, standardized process designed for serialized production.

The 6,000 man-hour remanufacturing process takes all life-limited components to zero-time status, either through replacement or overhaul, resulting in a plane that is 88 percent new. The airframe itself, which is not life-limited, is the only significant remaining part., Consequently, the 400XT is considered to be a new type in the Aircraft Bluebook.

As a result of the remanufacturing process, Nextant offers buyers of the 400XT a two-year whole aircraft warranty, pilot training with a uniform training curriculum and Level D full-flight simulator and a service network that includes nine centers in the U.S. and a tenth facility in Milan Linate, Italy.

=== Operational history ===
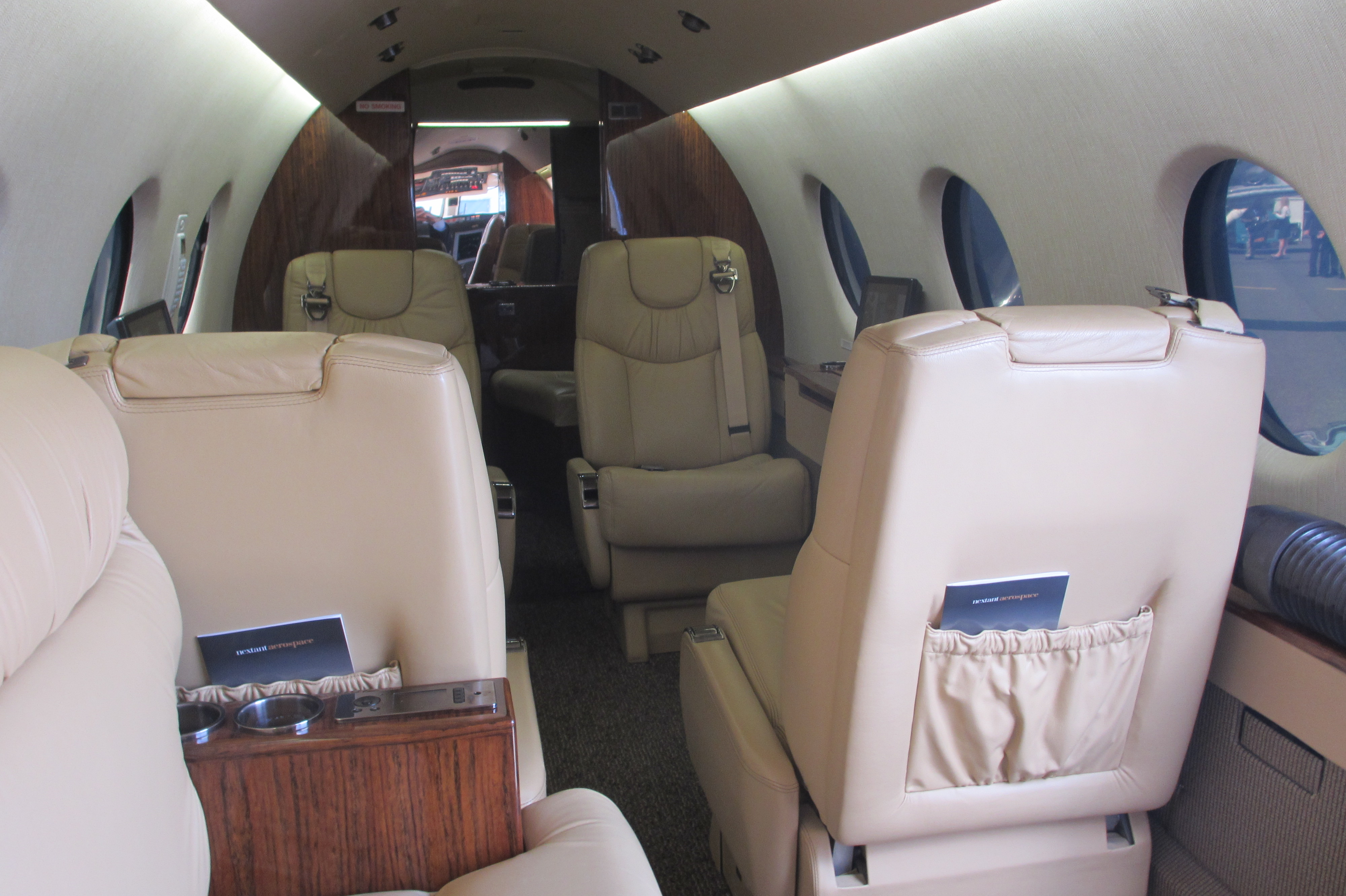
Retrofitted cabin

The 400XT can cruise at Mach 0.75-0.78 at FL430-450, pilots are comfortable flying it nearly five hours and typical missions are three hours. It burns 1,200 lb (540 kg) of fuel the first hour, dropping to 850–900 lb (390–410 kg) for the second at high speed, 750–875 lb (340–397 kg)/hr at Mach 0.73. Basic operating weights range from 11,000 to 11,100 lb (5,000 to 5,000 kg), full tanks payload is less than 500–600 lb (230–270 kg) but the average passengers are three, it can fly six passengers more than 1,500 nmi (2,800 km).

In October 2013, Travel Management Co. announced it would convert all its 50 jets, boosting the order book to more than 100. By the end of 2014, Nextant had completed 50 aircraft and nearly 30 of 40 on order had been returned to Flight Options. Customers are achieving 95.8% dispatch reliability.

The first reconditioned aircraft sold for $4.2 million and 2013 400XTi aircraft sold for just under $5 million, commanding in 2014 between $3.2 million and $4.2 million second hand (80 to 84% resale value). In 2014 its closest competitors used were the Embraer Phenom 300 with similar range but a longer cabin and a more maintenance friendly design, commanding $7 to $8.5 million second hand; the smaller cabin cross-sections Cessna CitationJet: 10-year-old CJ3s are just over $4 million but are slower, CJ4 aircraft go for $6.7 million for 2010 models to more than $9 million for 2014 models; or the Learjet 40XR but its weight, runway performance and fuel consumption are worse.

== Nextant G90XT ==
The $2.8 million Nextant G90XT is a remanufactured Beech King Air with its PT6A-135s replaced by single lever Czech GE H75s, a Garmin G1000 cockpit and a new cabin. Improved metals and 3D aero compressor enable a direct climb over FL250 and 275 to 280 kn (509 to 519 km/h) cruise, up to 17 kn (31 km/h) faster than a C90GT, while having 10% better fuel burn, 10% longer overhaul interval, and lower maintenance costs. It has a 1,000 nmi (1,900 km) range at full fuel with a single pilot and three passengers, 100 nmi (190 km) less for each additional passenger: below single-engine turboprops, like the Socata TBM and the Pilatus PC-12, but with a FL220 single engine altitude. The pre-production model max cruise is 263 kn (487 km/h) while burning 616 lb (279 kg)/hr at FL240, ISA+2 °C and 9,000 lb (4,100 kg), lowering to 317 lb (144 kg)/hr at a 199 kn (369 km/h) long-range cruise.

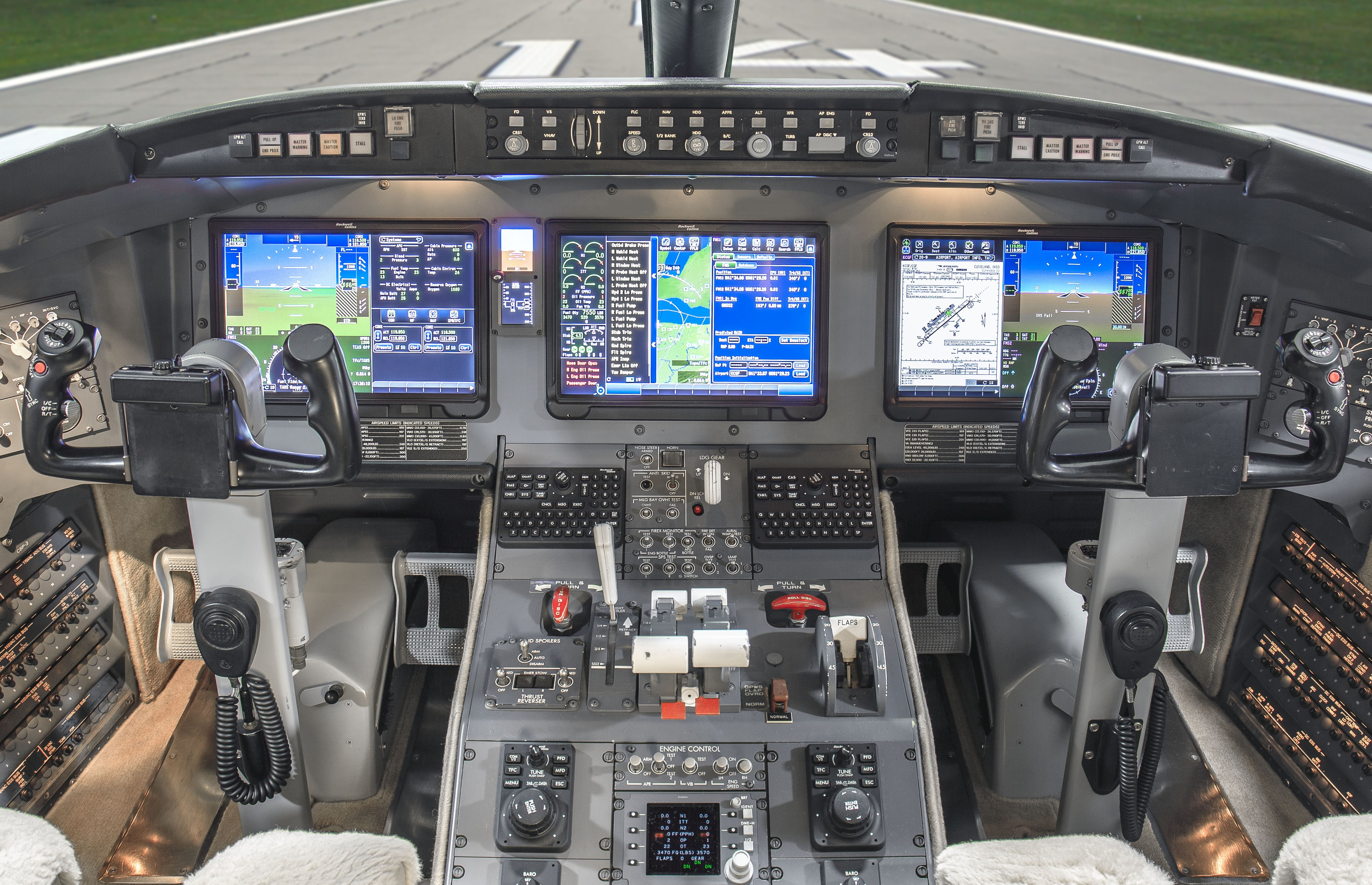
604XT Next Gen Flight Deck

== Nextant 604XT ==
The Bombardier Challenger 604–based 604XT was launched in 2017 with a Rockwell Collins ProLine Fusion flightdeck up from a ProLine 4. In October 2018, 100 flight test hours were logged, for certification and introduction planned for the fourth quarter. The second phase introduces a redesigned cabin and a wing extension boosting its range by up to 500nmi, for an 18- to 24-month certification timeframe.

By November, Nextant had secured the US STC for the avionics upgrade, before an early December first delivery. Of the over 300 Challenger 604s, 25 installations were pre-sold. The redesigned cabin and aerodynamic enhancements to increase range by 500nmi (925 km) to over 4,500nmi will follow.

As of October 29, 2019, Constant Aviation has delivered 23 Production 604XT's with the Nextant Next Gen Flight Deck. Constant Aviation expects to have completed 30 deliveries by the end of 2019 with significant backlog into 2020. Challenger 604 operators are seeing the advantage of improved low visibility operations and advanced features in the 604XT Flight Deck, such as integrated SXM Weather and the advanced Multiscan Weather Radar.

== Nextant management ==
Nextant was founded in 2007 by aviation entrepreneur Kenneth C. “Kenn” Ricci, who serves as the company's chief executive officer. Ricci also is a principal of Directional Aviation Capital, a private investment firm which is solely focused on aviation investments. Ricci also serves as chairman of Flexjet, LLC, the second-largest private aviation company in the U.S.
