= Kenn Ricci =

American businessman

Kenneth C. "Kenn" Ricci is an American aviation entrepreneur, the principal of Directional Aviation Capital, which owns or invests in various aviation enterprises including Flight Options and Flexjet, where he is chairman. He is an operating partner at Resilience Capital Partners, a private equity firm with a variety of portfolio companies, including an investment in Flight Options, and has helped found or lead other companies, including Nextant Aerospace and Constant Aviation.

== Corporate Wings ==
In 1981, Ricci began his entrepreneurial career by buying Corporate Wings, an aircraft management and charter operation company providing charter flight service, for $27,500 using a bank loan. The company grew rapidly, with annual revenues increasing from $300,000 to approximately $3.4 million between 1981 and 1985. The firm was named to the Inc. 500 list of America's fastest-growing companies.

Over time, Ricci expanded Corporate Wings into a diversified service-oriented transportation firm that provided other aviation support services, including aircraft maintenance, fueling and storage, and other aspects of aircraft operations.

In 2005, Corporate Wings acquired a stake in Mercury Air Centers, a company operating aircraft support facilities at airports around the U.S. As chief executive officer, Ricci realigned its operating divisions, deployed $245 million of invested capital and eventually sold the company to the Macquarie Infrastructure Trust in 2007. The deal was valued at $615 million.

== Flight Options ==
Ricci founded Flight Options in 1998 (28 years ago) in an effort to develop a nationwide fractional jet services ownership program. Flight Options enjoyed significant early success, with its annual revenues growing from $35 million to $300 million in 17 months of operations. In December 2001, the company combined operations with Raytheon Travel Air, a subsidiary of Raytheon Company, doubling the company's size.

Ricci left the company in 2003, but then re-purchased a stake in Flight Options in April 2008 and rejoined the company as chairman that summer. In March 2009, Directional Aviation Capital, an investment firm led by Ricci, and private equity firm Resilience Capital Partners, acquired an interest in Flight Options.

Like other companies in the private jet market, Flight Options saw its business diminish during the recession of 2008. However, the firm has subsequently recovered.

== Flexjet ==
In September 2013, Ricci announced that Directional Aviation would acquire Flexjet, a provider of fractional, jet card and charter services, from Bombardier Aerospace, for $185 million.

Ricci also announced substantial investments in Flexjet's fleet during 2013, placing orders with Bombardier that, with options, could total $5.6 billion in new aircraft. In 2014, Flexjet further expanded its fleet, moving beyond its former exclusive commitment to Bombardier-manufactured planes to add the Embraer Phenom 300 and Legacy 450. It also placed orders for up to 50 long-range aircraft from Gulfstream. In total, Flexjet has confirmed orders for 207 new planes with options that could total up to 445 aircraft.

Also during 2014, Flexjet prepared to exit the charter market. As part of the first consolidation of its aviation companies, Directional Aviation combined the charter brokerage operations of its Flexjet, Flight Options and Sentient Jet companies under the Skyjet brand name, which it had acquired from Bombardier as part of the Flexjet transaction. Skyjet would concentrate solely on charter services, with other divisions continuing to offer fractional and membership programs.

In November 2015, Flexjet announced that it had placed an order valued at $2.4 billion for 20 Aerion AS2 supersonic jets, with delivery to begin in 2023. In June 2017, Flexjet announced based on strong sales it was hiring pilots for the first time since 2015. In 2017, Flexjet received the first of its Gulfstream G650 business jets, which can travel 15 hours non-stop, giving it intercontinental range.

Flexjet agreed in October 2022 to merge with Horizon Acquisition Corporation II (NYSE: HZON), a publicly traded special-purpose acquisition company (SPAC) led by Todd Boehly. The proposed merger would result in Flexjet becoming a publicly listed company, with Ricci as chairman. In April 2023, Flexjet announced the deal would be terminated.

== Sentient Jet, Skyjet and PrivateFly ==
In June 2012 Directional acquired Sentient Jet. In October 2017, Sentient introduced its first jet card with guaranteed WiFi. In April 2018, Sentient Jet relaunched its website and at the same time projected $300 million in jet card sales for 2018. It said Q1 was its best quarter in more than 10 years in both sales and hours flown. In September 2018, Directional Aviation announced it had acquired charter broker PrivateFly and would house it within OneSky LLC, which includes Flexjet, SentientJet, and Skyjet. The company said the acquisition furthers its global reach and technology-driven approach to selling private jet charter flights. In July 2020, Ricci announced FXAIR as a new upmarket private jet charter brand. The broker will utilize 17 Bombardier aircraft coming off fractional contracts. They will be operated by Flexjet and flown by Flexjet pilots.

== Nextant Aerospace ==
Ricci also has founded or been involved with the management of several other companies, including Nextant Aerospace, where he is chief executive officer.

== Helicopters and Urban Air Mobility ==
In 2021, Ricci oversaw Directional’s acquisition of two helicopter travel providers: U.K.-based Halo Aviation and U.S.-based Associated Aircraft Group, and by mid-2022, positioned those entities to serve as the foundation for a Flexjet helicopter division.

Ricci also created Zanite Acquisition Corporation, a special purpose acquisition company to raise capital via public markets to invest in companies focused on urban air mobility, and emerging aviation technology. By December 2021, it was announced that Zanite’s acquisition partner would be Eve Air Mobility, a subsidiary of Brazilian aerospace manufacturer Embraer working to bring to market the Eve electric vertical take-off and landing vehicle. At the time of the announcement Ricci explained Zanite choose to align with Eve because of its simplistic design, Embraer’s track record of bringing new aircraft through certification to market, an already installed global support network and a presence in markets outside the U.S., that are positioned to be early adopters for urban air mobility UAM.

In May 2022, Eve Air Mobility (EVEX) went public on the New York Stock Exchange following the company's merger with Zanite Acquisition Corp and has more than 2,000 orders for its aircraft from operators around the world.

== Personal background ==
Ricci is an alumnus of the University of Notre Dame and the Cleveland–Marshall College of Law. He is a certified pilot for Gulfstream, Falcon and Citation jets. He was the personal pilot of Bill Clinton during his first campaign for US president.

Ricci is a member of the Board of Trustees for the University of Notre Dame; a member of the boards of University Hospitals, the Smithsonian, and several corporations; and the aviation advisor to the Guggenheim Aero Opportunity Fund. He is a member of the Young Presidents' Organization.

In 2017, Ricci donated $100 million to Notre Dame, the largest unrestricted gift in the university's history, using a Philanthropic Succession Partnership, a giving mechanism he pioneered. He also has made other donations to Notre Dame, including a $5 million gift in 2016 to create an outdoor home for the Band of the Fighting Irish. Ricci has contributed funds to fight cystic fibrosis, including $2 million to establish the Austin Ricci Chair in Pediatric Pulmonary Care and Research at UH Rainbow Babies & Children's Hospital in Cleveland.

== Accolades ==
Ricci has received a number of awards, including an Ernst & Young Entrepreneur of the Year award and four NEO Success Awards for business growth. was named one of the most influential people in aviation by Aviation International News. In 2010, Ricci received the Harvard Business School's Dively Entrepreneurship Award. In 2012, he was the recipient of the William A. Ong Memorial Award from the National Air Transportation Association. and Nextant was selected as Aviation Week's 2015 winner of the Laureate for Business Aviation for introducing new technology to business aviation.

In 2017, Ricci was named a recipient of the Living Legends of Aviation Lifetime Aviation Entrepreneur Award. In 2019, Ricci was formally inducted into the Living Legends of Aviation. Ricci was named to Town & Country magazine's Top 50 Philanthropists list for 2018, and was also inducted into the Cleveland-Marshall College of Law Hall of Fame.
