= Aviator call sign =

Alternate name used by military aircraft operators

The call signs of a U.S. Navy aviator and their weapon systems officer, "Supafly" and "LBJ" respectively, stenciled on the canopy rails of their F-14 Tomcat

An aviator call sign (alternatively aviator callsign or air force call sign) is a military call sign given to a military pilot, flight officer, or enlisted aviator. It serves as a specialized form of nickname that is used over radio communications as well as a substitute for the aviator's name, and is often displayed on name tags, flight helmets, and on the aviator's assigned aircraft, usually on the fuselage or canopy rails. Call signs are part of the traditions of certain militaries and are intended as extensions of the aviator's identity, to the point that some may be recognized from their call sign instead of their actual name.

Call signs are most commonly used in air forces and naval aviation by combat pilots (i.e. pilots, copilots, and crew of fighters, attackers, multiroles, and bombers) and military helicopter pilots, though they may also be used by other military aviators such as pilots and crew of transports, maritime patrol aircraft, and electronic-warfare aircraft, as well as in army aviation. Many NASA astronauts with military aviation backgrounds are also often referred to during spaceflights by their call signs. Similar call signs may be used in non-military contexts and organizations as well, such as in aerobatics, police aviation, or aerial firefighting.

== History ==
Royal Air Force airmen at a bar in France during the "Phoney War" period of World War II, 1939–1940. The "Nellis bar test" serves as an informal measure of a call sign's appropriateness: the call sign should theoretically be able to be shouted across a crowded air force bar without making the patrons uncomfortable or drawing ire from superior officers.

The specific historical origin of the use of call signs in military aviation is unclear, but the practice is generally agreed to have emerged before or during World War I. A possible origin story suggests that, due to high casualty rates among aviators during World War I, call signs were initially devised as a substitute for names to ensure personal bonds among aviators were not too strong, thereby lessening the impact in the event their comrades did not return from an operation. Another historical claim suggests that call signs acquired their modern form during the interwar period, when the practice became widespread among ground crews, air traffic controllers, and aviators to help identify air units over then-novel aerial radio communications. At this time, call signs were also assigned to some ships and geographic points, as well as individual enemy pilots who were recognizable or distinguished, such as known flying aces.

Call signs became increasingly common during World War II with the massive role of the air war, during which call signs reportedly proved useful to confuse enemy signals intelligence and protect aviators' identities. Use of call signs was widespread in Western military aviation by the Vietnam War, and the practice became an increasingly formalized aspect of air forces in the 1970s and 1980s.

== Traditions ==
=== Origins ===
A U.S. Navy aviator in his F/A-18 Hornet. His call sign, "Guido", is derived from an insult for Italian Americans.

The origins of aviator call signs are greatly varied. Call signs traditionally play on or reference variants and misspellings of the aviator's given name, surname, or middle name. Other common inspirations for call signs include personality traits, personal appearances, references to historical figures or popular culture, past events in the aviator's career or personal history, or the aviator's flying style. There are also call signs derived from acronyms or abbreviations for longer phrases or epithets, such as "TERPID" ("TERminally stuPID") or "MEATLOAF" ("My EPU Activated due to a Total Lack Of Any Fuel").

Many call signs are double entendres or have deeper subtext relating to backstories, specific contexts, military slang, or in-jokes, intended to add "a certain element of intrigue" to them or disguise a more crass or humorous meaning. Individual examples from across the United States Armed Forces include "Chaser", for a U.S. Navy pilot who formerly worked as a hull maintenance technician maintaining the ship's plumbing, thus referred to as a "shit-chaser" in naval slang; "JackieO", playing on an Air National Guard pilot's distinction as her squadron's "first lady pilot" mixed with a personal story involving "a parachute knife and a do-it-yourself bob haircut", hence the specific reference to former First Lady Jacqueline Kennedy Onassis; or "LOBO", a two-fold reference to both an incident where a U.S. Air Force pilot's pet dogs ran loose, spawning a joke of him owning "rabid wolves" ("lobo" being Spanish for "wolf"), as well as an acronym for "Leery Of Bullets Ordnance" from said pilot's initial inexperience with his aircraft's guns on the bombing range.

Call signs are most often derived from embarrassing situations or negative traits, and may intentionally come off as unflattering or even insulting, though these are often intended as "good-natured" banter and insult comedy among aviators to "build a humility-based culture" and serve as humbling reminders for past mistakes. As the purpose of call signs is to build camaraderie and kinship, they are ideally able to age well, are not outright discriminatory, and will be something the aviator in question can reasonably tolerate and live with, though there have been instances where inappropriate or disagreeable call signs have been considered or assigned regardless.

=== Assignment ===
A Royal Canadian Air Force pilot flying a CF-18 Hornet during an aerial refueling. Their call sign, stenciled below the canopy, is "Buk".

Aviators cannot give themselves a call sign. It is considered bad form to try to do so, especially if the self-suggested call sign is considered "too cool" or self-aggrandizing, and aviators who attempt this are almost guaranteed to receive a deliberately worse call sign in response. Call signs must originate from other members of their squadron, flight, wing, training class, or other applicable cohort or unit, and the call sign has to be "earned" early into the aviator's career as a junior officer, during which they are referred to by more general terms such as "Fucking New Guy" pending the creation of a proper call sign. The squadron commander generally has final say on call signs, and may reject those deemed too derogatory or aggressive.

In some traditions, a "naming ceremony" is held by a squadron to assign call signs to their new members once they are deemed ready. In an example of such a ceremony from the 62nd Fighter Squadron at Luke Air Force Base, the squadron shares stories about the new members in a roast-like event before voting on the top three picks for each one's new call sign, though in some cases an aviator's call sign may have already been agreed upon long beforehand, with the vote being more of a formality. The new members may be encouraged to bring "bribes" to the ceremony, such as high-quality alcohol or payment for everyone's drinks during happy hour, to convince their squadron to grant them a less embarrassing call sign, though whether these "bribes" work is not guaranteed. The more that aviators complain about a call sign they are given, the more likely it is to stick; they are expected to embrace their call sign and accept it as part of their identity, regardless of what it is.

An aviator's call sign becomes permanent once they fly their first sortie with the unit that gave them the call sign, though some aviators may have multiple call signs throughout their career, being changed based on different events, transfers to different units, or being reassigned to another unit where a senior member already has the same call sign. Trainees often only receive a temporary call sign before they are eventually transferred to a combat unit.

== Examples ==
=== Real ===
- U.S. Navy Captain Dale Snodgrass used the call sign "Snort". He is known for a photo of him in his F-14 Tomcat doing a knife edge pass off the side of the USS America (CV-66) and later flying warbirds at airshows.
- U.S. Navy Lieutenant Kara Hultgreen was originally given the call sign "Hulk" because of her ability to bench-press 200 pounds. Later, after a television appearance in which she wore noticeable makeup, her call sign was changed to "Revlon", and a 1998 biography about Hultgreen was entitled Call Sign Revlon in this regard.
- Astronaut Duane G. Carey used the call sign "Spider" as an A-10 Thunderbolt II pilot. When he transferred to a squadron flying the F-16 Fighting Falcon, his call sign was changed to "Digger", because another pilot with that call sign had recently left, and the squadron wanted to continue its use.

=== Fictional ===
==== Film ====
- The 1986 film Top Gun, set at the United States Navy Fighter Weapons School, featured several aviators with call signs, including Pete Mitchell (Tom Cruise): "Maverick"; Tom Kasansky (Val Kilmer): "Iceman"; and Nick Bradshaw (Anthony Edwards): "Goose". In addition, a number of military or former military personnel acted as crew to the film: Rick Moe ("Curly"); Ray Seckinger ("Secks"); Thomas Sobieck ("Sobs"); Robert Willard ("Rat"); C.J. Heatley ("Heater"); and Ricky Hammonds ("Organ").
- In the 1991 film Flight of the Intruder, new A-6 Intruder pilot LTJG Jack Barlow is given the call sign "Razor" because he did not look old enough to shave. It is later changed to "Straight Razor" after he became "a real weapon" in the eyes of his commanding officer. The book's principal character, Jake Grafton, has the call sign "Cool Hand".
- The 2019 film Captain Marvel, set in 1995, has former ex-USAF test pilot and member of an elite Kree military unit, Carol Danvers having "Avenger" as her call sign. This call sign is later used by Nick Fury to rename the initiative that he had earlier drafted to locate heroes like Danvers, to "The Avengers".

==== Television ====
- Dwight Schultz's Captain H.M. "Howling Mad" Murdock, from the 1983 series The A-Team (as well as his counterpart in the 2010 film adaptation, as portrayed by Sharlto Copley) is a gifted but reckless pilot. Aptly named, Murdock displays symptoms of mental instability, as demonstrated by his weekly obsessions (ranging from inanimate objects to role playing). Whether or not he is in fact insane is often debated, due to demonstrations in his fine tuned skills of acting and mimicry.
- In the 1993 animated series SWAT Kats: The Radical Squadron, the main characters Chance Furlong and Jake Clawson have the call signs "T-Bone," and "Razor," respectively. Although their call signs are technically their SwatKAT aliases, they frequently refer to each other by their call sign even when not flying.
- In the 1995 TV series JAG, the lead character, Harmon Rabb, is given the name "Pappy" due to the fact that he is the oldest pilot in his squadron. This is later changed to "Hammer", which was his father's Vietnam War call sign—a mark of respect.
- In the 2004 television series Battlestar Galactica, a number of the Galactica's crew had call signs. William Adama (portrayed by Edward James Olmos) had "Husker".Lee Adama (Jamie Bamber) had "Apollo". Kara Thrace (Katee Sackhoff) had "Starbuck" and Karl Agathon (Tahmoh Penikett) had "Helo." Sharon Valerii (Grace Park) had two personas and a call sign for each: "Boomer" for Sharon Valerii and "Athena" for Sharon Agathon. In the original 1978 series on which the 2004 series was based, many of these were the characters' actual names, rather than call signs.
- Payload Specialist Howard Wolowitz from the 2007 series The Big Bang Theory has the unwanted astronaut call sign "Froot Loops" given to him by astronaut Mike Massimino.
- The episode "Newbie Dash" of the 2010 animated series My Little Pony: Friendship Is Magic revolves around Rainbow Dash trying to shake off an embarrassing call sign ("Crash") given to her upon joining the aerobatic team The Wonderbolts. She ultimately learns that all of her teammates have equally embarrassing nicknames, and embraces it as her call sign for the remainder of the series.

==== Print ====
- The Hal Jordan version of the DC Comics character Green Lantern, introduced in 1959, was a USAF test pilot with the call sign "Highball".
- The Marvel Comics character Corsair, space-faring father to X-Men characters Scott Summers and Alex Summers, got his alias from his call sign from his time as a USAF pilot.
- In Tom Clancy's 1993 novel Without Remorse, fictional Vice Admiral Winslow Holland Maxwell, during World War II, received the call sign "Winnie", which he hated; after a mission in which he shot down three Japanese planes (all confirmed by gunsight cameras), he found a new coffee mug in the wardroom, engraved with the call sign "Dutch". When he later became an admiral, he displayed the mug in a place of honor on his desk.
- A trilogy of novels published between 2001 and 2004 by Ward "Mooch" Carroll, Punk's War, Punk's Wing, and Punk's Fight, featured Rick Reichert, an F-14 pilot with the call sign "Punk", named by his commanding officer because he was caught listening to punk rock music while he was in the paraloft "walking" (suiting up) for a flight.

==== Video games ====
- The Ace Combat series refers to its otherwise unnamed silent protagonist by their call signs, though several are formal radio call signs named after their squadrons, such as Ace Combat 04: Shattered Skies protagonist "Mobius 1", while others with proper call sign names generally do not have their origins explained.

== See also ==
- Airline codes
- Brevity code
- List of ICAO aircraft type designators
- NATO phonetic alphabet
- Spacecraft call signs
