= Sunray =

Sunray is a term used in radio voice procedure (the conventions used in radio conversation) in the British military and in the military of nations strongly influenced by the British.

It refers to the formation or unit commander and serves as a synonym of "leader". This could be a commander of platoon, company, combat group, battalion, or battle group. The second-in-command is also referred to as "Sunray Minor".

== See also ==
- Military call sign
