= Resilience Capital Partners =

American private equity company

- Company type: Private, LLC
- Industry: Private Equity
- Founded: 2001
- Founder: Steven H. Rosen, Bassem A. Mansour
- Headquarters: Cleveland, Ohio, United States
- Website: www.resiliencecapital.com

Resilience Capital Partners is a Cleveland based private equity firm founded in 2001 by Steven H. Rosen and Bassem A. Mansour.

The firm invests in manufacturing and business services companies in the Eastern and Midwestern United States, companies typically between $25 million and $250 million in annual revenue.

== Investments ==
The firm invests through a series of private equity funds structured as limited partnerships. Its investors include both individuals and institutions such as pension plans, insurance companies, foundations and endowments, and family offices. The firm has three funds:

- The Resilience Fund LP (2002)
- The Resilience Fund II LP (2006)
- The Resilience Fund III LP (2012)

Resilience Capital Partners currently has capital under management in excess of $320 million.

== Portfolio companies ==
The firm's portfolio companies include:

- Affinity Special Apparel
- CR Brands
- Dealershop
- Flexjet
- Leader Auto Resources (LAR)
- Magnum Innovations
- Maysteel
- MIQ Partners

== Awards ==
The firm received the 2008 Private Equity Firm of the Year Deal Maker Award from the Association for Corporate Growth, Cleveland.
