= Spacecraft call signs =

Unique radio designation for a spacecraft

Spacecraft call signs are radio call signs used for communication in crewed spaceflight. These are not formalized or regulated to the same degree as other equivalent forms of transportation, like aircraft. The three nations currently launching crewed space missions use different methods to identify the ground and space radio stations; the United States uses either the names given to the space vehicles or else the project name and mission number. Russia traditionally assigns code names as call signs to individual cosmonauts, more in the manner of aviator call signs, rather than to the spacecraft.

The only continuity in call signs for spacecraft has been the issuance of "ISS"-suffixed (or "-1SS", for its visual similarity) call signs by various countries in the Amateur Radio service as a citizen of their country has been assigned there. The first Amateur Radio call sign assigned to the International Space Station was NA1SS by the United States. OR4ISS (Belgium), GB1SS (UK), DP0ISS (Germany), and RS0ISS (Russia) are examples of others, but are not all-inclusive of others also issued.

== United States ==
In America's first crewed space program Project Mercury, the astronauts named their individual spacecraft. These names each consisted of a significant word followed by the number 7 (representing the seven original astronauts) and were used as the call signs by the capsule communicators (CAPCOMs).

Flight	Astronaut	Call sign
Mercury-Redstone 3	Alan Shepard	Freedom 7
Mercury-Redstone 4	Gus Grissom	Liberty Bell 7
Mercury-Atlas 6	John Glenn	Friendship 7
Mercury-Atlas 7	Scott Carpenter	Aurora 7
Mercury-Atlas 8	Wally Schirra	Sigma 7
Mercury-Atlas 9	Gordon Cooper	Faith 7

In Project Gemini, the astronauts were not officially permitted to name their two-man spacecraft, which was identified by "Gemini" followed by the mission number (3 through 12). A notable exception was that Gus Grissom named his Gemini 3 spacecraft Molly Brown after the Titanic survivor, as a joke based on his experience with his Liberty Bell 7 capsule sinking. This name was used as a call sign by CAPCOM L. Gordon Cooper, without NASA's approval.

Starting with the second Gemini flight, Gemini 4, NASA used the Lyndon B. Johnson Space Center (JSC) to house the flight control center. The call sign for this facility was Houston. The Christopher C. Kraft Jr. Mission Control Center, the current flight control facility at JSC, also uses Houston as its call sign.

The practice of using the mission number continued through the first two flights of the Project Apollo crewed lunar landing program, Apollo 7 and Apollo 8. But all remaining Apollo missions included two crewed spacecraft (Command/Service Module (CSM) and Lunar Module (LM)) on each flight, which required the use of separate call signs for each vehicle when they flew independently of each other. For this reason, NASA permitted the three-man crews to name both crafts for each of their missions, and these names were used as the call signs. A temporary exception to this was on the first Moon landing, Apollo 11: since the first Moon landing site was in the Sea of Tranquillity, the call sign Tranquillity Base was used while the LM was on the lunar surface. Before and after the independent flight of the LM, the mission number was used as the call sign. The Apollo call signs were:

Flight	Command Module	Lunar Module
Apollo 9	Gumdrop	Spider
Apollo 10	Charlie Brown	Snoopy
Apollo 11	Columbia	Eagle
Apollo 12	Yankee Clipper	Intrepid
Apollo 13	Odyssey	Aquarius
Apollo 14	Kitty Hawk	Antares
Apollo 15	Endeavour	Falcon
Apollo 16	Casper	Orion
Apollo 17	America	Challenger

For project Skylab, the practice returned to using the mission name as the spacecraft call sign, since the Skylab station was left uncrewed while the shuttle vehicle (an Apollo CSM) carried a crew to it or back to Earth.

The six Space Shuttle orbiters were given individual names (they also had letter-and-number callsigns) by NASA, which were used as the call signs: Enterprise (OV-101, which was not fitted for spaceflight), Columbia (OV-102), Challenger (OV-099), Discovery (OV-103), Atlantis (OV-104), and Endeavour (OV-105). Of these, Columbia, Challenger, and Endeavour had served as call-signs of Apollo spacecraft.

SpaceX Crew Dragon capsules use two calls signs. Dragon is used as a generic call sign, particularly if the capsule has not been named. The name of the spacecraft is also used as a call sign. The name and call sign of each Crew Dragon, as given by the crew of the spacecraft's initial mission, is:

Serial	Name	Named By
C206	Endeavour	Demo-2
C207	Resilience	Crew-1
C210	Endurance	Crew-3
C212	Freedom	Crew-4
C213	Grace	Ax-4

Endeavour, which was named for the space shuttle Endeavour, had previously served as call signs for both an Apollo spacecraft and the spacecraft's namesake shuttle. The name Freedom honors Freedom 7, the space capsule used by Alan Shepard's Mercury Redstone 3, the first United States human spaceflight mission.

The call sign SpaceX is used by the Crew Operations and Resources Engineer (CORE) (the SpaceX equivalent of the CAPCOM in Houston) at SpaceX Mission Control (MCC-X) in Hawthorne, California.

Boeing Starliner capsules use the generic call sign Starliner. The only named Starliner capsule, Starliner Spacecraft 3, was named Calypso by Boeing Crewed Flight Test pilot Sunita Williams and can use that name as an alternate call sign. As Boeing Mission Control (MCC-CST) is located at the Johnson Space Center, the standard JSC call sign Houston is used.

== Russia (including the former Soviet Union) ==
The spacecraft of the Soviet Union were not individually named, nor are those of Russia today. Only the general type of spacecraft, for example, "Vostok," "Soyuz," or "Soyuz-T" is publicly announced after launch, usually followed by the number of the flight of that type of spacecraft. The Soviet and now Russian call signs are more nearly code words, and so are not disclosed before launch. Each is given to a particular cosmonaut who commands a spacecraft, generally staying as his or her designation from spacecraft to spacecraft. The other crew members use the same call sign with a number of their rank in the chain of command suffixed. Russian popular journalism refers to the crew by the plural of the call sign (for example, "the Fotons").

Kedr, meaning "cedar," was the call sign of Yuri Gagarin, the first man in space. It would have disclosed nothing to a listener concerning the momentousness of the flight. The rest of the call signs of the Vostok series were the names of birds. Pavel Popovich and Andriyan Nikolayev's call signs in their joint flight in Vostok-3 and Vostok-4, Sokol ("falcon") and Berkut ("golden eagle"), were widely popularized by Soviet media. The call sign of the launch facility itself for Vostok was nearly a code word: Zarya, meaning "dawn".

Early Soyuz flights intent on practicing docking procedures were given call signs elaborating on the first few letters of an alphabet. Soyuz 4, which had the call sign Amur, docked with Soyuz 5, called Baikal - the names derived from a railway project of that era, intending to link those two geographical features. Soyuz 6 was given a call sign equivalent to "Antaeus," which referred to the largest aircraft of the era, the Antonov 22. Its mission in a group flight was to film the intended docking of Soyuz 7 (called Buran, which means "snowstorm") with Soyuz 8, called Granit ("granite") - standard Soviet military call signs. The equivalent for the letter A was Aktif, meaning "Active"; it would be inappropriate for the mission of Soyuz 6.

Later Soyuz flights to the Salyut space stations and Mir had less noteworthy call signs: Foton, meaning "photon", etc.

In contrast to the naming conventions applied by the Soviet Union and now Russia, most American space flights, with the exception of those of Project Gemini and early Apollo flights, have had their spacecraft officially named. Calls to ground facilities by radiotelephone use the name of the spacecraft (e.g., "The Eagle has landed") as the call sign.

== International Space Station ==
The call sign of the International Space Station was Alpha, now Station.

When different space missions and different control centers work together in joint operations, for example when a Dragon capsule docks to the ISS, NASA connects all communication channels using what is known as the Big Loop. When communicating on the Big Loop, one can hear the call signs Dragon, Starliner, SpaceX, Houston and Station at any given time.

The following Call signs are available for use on the ISS:

- RUSSIAN: RS0ISS
- USA: NA1SS
- EUROPEAN: DP0ISS, OR4ISS, IR0ISS

The following callsigns are called when the crew needs to contact one of the field centers on the ground what ever segment they are in when performing experiments:

- Houston: As in Mission Control Houston at the Christopher C. Kraft Jr. Mission Control Center in Houston Texas
- Huntsville: As in the Payload Operations and Integration Center in Huntsville Alabama
- Moscow: As in Mission Control Moscow at the RKA Mission Control Center in Korolyov Russia outside of Moscow
- Munich: As in the Columbus Control Centre located at ESA Headquarters in Munich Germany
- Saint Hubert: Rarely used as in Mobile Servicing System Control and Training Center at CSA Headquarters in Saint Hubert Quebec
- Tsukuba: As in the Space Station Integration and Promotion Center at JAXA Headquarters Tsukuba Space Center Japan
- SpaceX/Hawthorne: As in the Dragon Control Center at SpaceX Headquarters in Hawthorne, California
