= List of aircraft type designators =

Flag of the ICAO

An aircraft type designator is a two-, three- or four-character alphanumeric code designating every aircraft type (and some sub-types) that may appear in flight planning. These codes are defined by both the International Civil Aviation Organization (ICAO) and the International Air Transport Association (IATA).

ICAO codes are published in ICAO Document 8643 Aircraft Type Designators and are used by air traffic control and airline operations such as flight planning. While ICAO designators are used to distinguish between aircraft types and variants that have different performance characteristics affecting ATC, the codes do not differentiate between service characteristics (passenger and freight variants of the same type/series will have the same ICAO code).

IATA codes are published in Appendix A of IATA's annual Standard Schedules Information Manual (SSIM) and are used for airline timetables and computer reservation systems. IATA designators are used to distinguish between aircraft types and variants that have differences from an airline commercial perspective (size, role, interior configuration, etc.). As well as an Aircraft Type Code, IATA may optionally define an Aircraft Group Code for types and variants that share common characteristics (for example all Boeing 747 freighters, regardless of series).

The following is a partial list of ICAO type designators for a range of multi-engined and turbine aircraft, with corresponding IATA type codes where available.

ICAO aircraft type designators
ICAO code	IATA type code	Model
A124	A4F	Antonov An-124 Ruslan
A140	A40	Antonov An-140
A148	A81	Antonov An-148
A158	A58	Antonov An-158
A19N	31N	Airbus A319neo
A20N	32N	Airbus A320neo
A21N	32Q	Airbus A321neo/LR/XLR
A225	A5F	Antonov An-225 Mriya
A306	AB6	Airbus A300-600
A306	ABY	Airbus A300-600 Freighter
A30B	AB4	Airbus A300B2, A300B4 and A300C4
A310	312	Airbus A310-200
A310	313	Airbus A310-300
A318	318	Airbus A318
A318	32C	Airbus A318 (sharklets)
A319	319	Airbus A319
A319	32D	Airbus A319 (sharklets)
A320	320	Airbus A320
A320	32A	Airbus A320 (sharklets)
A321	321	Airbus A321
A321	32B	Airbus A321 (sharklets)
A332	332	Airbus A330-200
A332	33X	Airbus A330-200 Freighter
A333	333	Airbus A330-300
A333	33Y	Airbus A330-300 Freighter
A337	33B	Airbus A330-700 "BelugaXL"
A338	338	Airbus A330-800
A339	339	Airbus A330-900
A342	342	Airbus A340-200
A343	343	Airbus A340-300
A345	345	Airbus A340-500
A346	346	Airbus A340-600
A359	359	Airbus A350-900
A35K	351	Airbus A350-1000
A388	388	Airbus A380-800
A3ST	ABB	Airbus A300-600ST "Super Transporter" / "Beluga"
A400	AI4	Airbus A400M Atlas
A748	HS7	Hawker Siddeley HS 748
AC90	ACT	Gulfstream/Rockwell (Aero) Turbo Commander 690
AJ27	C27	Comac ARJ21-700 / C909
AN12	ANF	Antonov An-12
AN24	AN4	Antonov An-24
AN26	A26	Antonov An-26
AN28	A28	Antonov An-28
AN30	A30	Antonov An-30
AN32	A32	Antonov An-32
AN72	AN7	Antonov An-72 / An-74
AT43	AT4	Aerospatiale/Alenia ATR 42-300 / 320
AT45	AT5	Aerospatiale/Alenia ATR 42-500
AT46	ATR	Aerospatiale/Alenia ATR 42-600
AT72	AT7	Aerospatiale/Alenia ATR 72-201/-202
AT73	ATR	Aerospatiale/Alenia ATR 72-211/-212
AT75	ATR	Aerospatiale/Alenia ATR 72-212A (500)
AT76	ATR	Aerospatiale/Alenia ATR 72-212A (600)
ATP	ATP	British Aerospace ATP
B190	BEH	Beechcraft 1900
B37M	7M7	Boeing 737 MAX 7
B38M	7M8	Boeing 737 MAX 8
B39M	7M9	Boeing 737 MAX 9
B3XM	7MJ	Boeing 737 MAX 10
B461	141	BAe 146-100
B462	142	BAe 146-200
B463	143	BAe 146-300
B52	—N/a	Boeing B-52 Stratofortress
B703	703	Boeing 707
B712	717	Boeing 717
B720	B72	Boeing 720B
B721	721	Boeing 727-100
B722	722	Boeing 727-200
B732	732	Boeing 737-200
B732	73F	Boeing 737-200 Freighter
B732	73L	Boeing 737-200 Combi
B733	733	Boeing 737-300
B733	73C	Boeing 737-300 Winglets
B733	73Y	Boeing 737-300 Freighter
B734	734	Boeing 737-400
B734	73P	Boeing 737-400 Freighter
B735	735	Boeing 737-500
B735	73E	Boeing 737-500 Winglets
B736	736	Boeing 737-600
B737	73G	Boeing 737-700 / Boeing 737-700ER
B737	73W	Boeing 737-700 Winglets
B738	738	Boeing 737-800
B738	73H	Boeing 737-800 Winglets
B738	73K	Boeing 737-800 Freighter Winglets
B738	73U	Boeing 737-800 Freighter
B739	739	Boeing 737-900 / Boeing 737-900ER
B739	73J	Boeing 737-900 Winglets
B741	741	Boeing 747-100
B741	74T	Boeing 747-100 Freighter
B742	742	Boeing 747-200
B742	74C	Boeing 747-200M
B742	74X	Boeing 747-200F
B743	743	Boeing 747-300
B743	74D	Boeing 747-300M
B744	744	Boeing 747-400 / Boeing 747-400ER
B744	74E	Boeing 747-400M
B744	74Y	Boeing 747-400F / Boeing 747-400ERF
B748	74H	Boeing 747-8I
B748	74N	Boeing 747-8F
B74R	74R	Boeing 747SR
B74R	74V	Boeing 747SR Freighter
B74S	74L	Boeing 747SP
B752	752	Boeing 757-200
B752	75F	Boeing 757F
B752	75W	Boeing 757-200 Winglets
B753	753	Boeing 757-300
B762	762	Boeing 767-200 / Boeing 767-200ER
B762	76X	Boeing 767-200 Freighter / Boeing 767-200ER
B763	763	Boeing 767-300 / Boeing 767-300ER
B763	76W	Boeing 767-300ER Winglets
B763	76Y	Boeing 767-300 Freighter
B764	764	Boeing 767-400ER
B772	772	Boeing 777-200 / Boeing 777-200ER
B773	773	Boeing 777-300
B778	778	Boeing 777-8 / Boeing 777-8F
B779	779	Boeing 777-9
B77L	77L	Boeing 777-200LR
B77L	77X	Boeing 777-200 Freighter
B77W	77W	Boeing 777-300ER
B788	788	Boeing 787-8
B789	789	Boeing 787-9
B78X	781	Boeing 787-10
BA11	B11	British Aerospace (BAC) One Eleven
BCS1	221	Bombardier CSeries CS100 / Airbus A220-100
BCS3	223	Bombardier CSeries CS300 / Airbus A220-300
BE20	B20	Beechcraft (Super) King Air 200
BE40	BE4	Hawker 400
BE99	B99	Beechcraft Model 99
BELF	SHB	Shorts SC-5 Belfast
BER2	—N/a	Beriev Be-200 Altair
BLCF	74B	Boeing 747-400 LCF Dreamlifter
C130	LOH	Lockheed L-182 / 282 / 382 (L-100) Hercules
C17	C17	Boeing C-17 Globemaster III
C208	C08	Cessna 208 Caravan
C212	CS2	CASA / IPTN 212 Aviocar
C25A	CJ1	Cessna Citation CJ2
C25B	CJ1	Cessna Citation CJ3
C25C	CJ1	Cessna Citation CJ4
C30J	LOH	Lockheed Martin C-130J Hercules
C408	CS4	Cessna 408 SkyCourier
C500	CJ1	Cessna Citation I
C510	CJ1	Cessna Citation Mustang
C525	CJ1	Cessna CitationJet
C550	CJ1	Cessna Citation II
C560	CJ1	Cessna Citation V
C56X	CJ1	Cessna Citation Excel
C5M	—N/a	Lockheed C-5M Super Galaxy
C650	CJ1	Cessna Citation III, VI, VII
C680	CJ1	Cessna Citation Sovereign
C68A	CJ1	Cessna Citation Latitude
C700	CJ1	Cessna Citation Longitude
C750	CJ1	Cessna Citation X
C919	919	Comac C919
CL2T	—N/a	Bombardier 415
CL30	CL3	Bombardier BD-100 Challenger 300
CL35	CL3	Bombardier BD-100 Challenger 350
CL60	CCJ	Canadair Challenger 600
CN35	CS5	CASA/IPTN CN-235
CRJ1	CR1	Canadair Regional Jet 100
CRJ2	CR2	Canadair Regional Jet 200
CRJ7	CR7	Canadair Regional Jet 550
CRJ9	CR9	Canadair Regional Jet 900
CRJX	CRK	Canadair Regional Jet 1000
CVLT	CV5	Convair CV-580, Convair CV-600, Convair CV-640
D228	D28	Dornier 228
D328	D38	Fairchild Dornier Do.328
DC10	D11	Douglas DC-10-10 / -15 Passenger
DC10	D1C	Douglas DC-10-30 / -40 Passenger
DC10	D1M	Douglas DC-10-30 Combi
DC10	D1X	Douglas DC-10-10 Freighter
DC10	D1Y	Douglas DC-10-30 / -40 Freighter
DC85	D8T	Douglas DC-8-50
DC86	D8L	Douglas DC-8-62
DC87	D8Q	Douglas DC-8-72
DC91	D91	Douglas DC-9-10
DC92	D92	Douglas DC-9-20
DC93	D93	Douglas DC-9-30
DC94	D94	Douglas DC-9-40
DC95	D95	Douglas DC-9-50
DH8A	DH1	De Havilland Canada DHC-8-100 Dash 8 / 8Q
DH8B	DH2	De Havilland Canada DHC-8-200 Dash 8 / 8Q
DH8C	DH3	De Havilland Canada DHC-8-300 Dash 8 / 8Q
DH8D	DH4	De Havilland Canada DHC-8-400 Dash 8Q
DHC5	DHC	De Havilland Canada DHC-5 Buffalo
DHC6	DHT	De Havilland Canada DHC-6 Twin Otter
DHC7	DH7	De Havilland Canada DHC-7 Dash 7
E110	EMB	Embraer EMB 110 Bandeirante
E120	EM2	Embraer EMB 120 Brasilia
E135	ER3	Embraer RJ135
E135	ERD	Embraer RJ140
E145	ER4	Embraer RJ145
E170	E70	Embraer 170
E190	E90	Embraer 190 / Lineage 1000
E195	E95	Embraer 195
E290	290	Embraer E190-E2
E295	295	Embraer E195-E2
E35L	ER3	Embraer Legacy 600 / Legacy 650
E50P	EP1	Embraer Phenom 100
E545	E54	Embraer Legacy 450 / Praetor 500
E550	E55	Embraer Legacy 500 / Praetor 600
E55P	EP3	Embraer Phenom 300
E75L	E7W	Embraer 175 (long wing)
E75S	E75	Embraer 175 (short wing)
EA50	EA5	Eclipse 500
F100	100	Fokker 100
F27	F27	Fokker F27 Friendship
F28	F21	Fokker F28 Fellowship
F2TH	D20	Dassault Falcon 2000
F406	CNT	Reims-Cessna F406 Caravan II
F50	F50	Fokker 50
F70	F70	Fokker 70
F900	DF9	Dassault Falcon 900
ASTR	GR1	Gulfstream G100
FA50	DF3	Dassault Falcon 50
FA6X	DF6	Dassault Falcon 6X
FA7X	DF7	Dassault Falcon 7X
G159	GRS	Gulfstream Aerospace G-159 Gulfstream I
G280	GR3	Gulfstream G280
G73T	GRM	Grumman G-73 Turbo Mallard
GA7C	GL7	Gulfstream G700
GALX	—N/a	Gulfstream G200 / IAI Galaxy
GL5T	CCX	Bombardier Global 5000
GL7T	CCX	Bombardier Global 7500 / Global 8000
GLEX	CCX	Bombardier Global Express / Raytheon Sentinel
GLF4	GJ4	Gulfstream IV
GLF5	GJ5	Gulfstream V
GLF6	GJ6	Gulfstream G650
H25B	H25	British Aerospace 125 series / Hawker/Raytheon 700/800/800XP/850/900
H25C	H25	British Aerospace 125-1000 series / Hawker/Raytheon 1000
HDJT	HHJ	Honda HA-420
I114	I14	Ilyushin Il-114
IL18	IL8	Ilyushin Il-18
IL62	IL6	Ilyushin Il-62
IL76	IL7	Ilyushin Il-76
IL86	ILW	Ilyushin Il-86
IL96	I93	Ilyushin Il-96
J328	FRJ	Fairchild Dornier 328JET
JS31	J31	British Aerospace Jetstream 31
JS32	J32	British Aerospace Jetstream 32
JS41	J41	British Aerospace Jetstream 41
K35R	K35	Boeing KC-135 Stratotanker
L101	L10	Lockheed L-1011 Tristar
L188	LOE	Lockheed L-188 Electra
L410	L4T	Let 410 Turbolet
LJ35	LRJ	Learjet 35 / 36 / C-21A
LJ60	LRJ	Learjet 60
MD11	M11	McDonnell Douglas MD-11
MD11	M1F	McDonnell Douglas MD-11F
MD11	M1M	McDonnell Douglas MD-11C
MD81	M81	McDonnell Douglas MD-81
MD82	M82	McDonnell Douglas MD-82
MD83	M83	McDonnell Douglas MD-83
MD87	M87	McDonnell Douglas MD-87
MD88	M88	McDonnell Douglas MD-88
MD90	M90	McDonnell Douglas MD-90
MU2	MU2	Mitsubishi Mu-2
N262	ND2	Aerospatiale (Nord) 262
NOMA	CD2	Government Aircraft Factories N22B / N24A Nomad
P180	P18	Piaggio P.180 Avanti
P8	—N/a	Boeing P-8 Poseidon
PAY2	PY2	Piper Cheyenne 2
PC12	PL2	Pilatus PC-12
PC24	PL4	Pilatus PC-24
RJ1H	AR1	Avro RJ100
RJ70	AR7	Avro RJ70
RJ85	AR8	Avro RJ85
S601	NDC	Aerospatiale SN.601 Corvette
SB20	S20	Saab 2000
SC7	SHS	Shorts SC-7 Skyvan
SF34	SF3	Saab SF340A/B
SH33	SH3	Shorts SD.330
SH36	SH6	Shorts SD.360
SU95	SU9	Sukhoi Superjet 100-95
SW4	SW4	Fairchild Swearingen Metroliner
T134	TU3	Tupolev Tu-134
T154	TU5	Tupolev Tu-154
T204	T20	Tupolev Tu-204 / Tu-214
WW24	WWP	Israel Aircraft Industries 1124 Westwind
Y12	YN2	Harbin Y-12
YK40	YK4	Yakovlev Yak-40
YK42	YK2	Yakovlev Yak-42
YS11	YS1	NAMC YS-11

== See also ==
- List of aircraft
- List of Bushplanes
- List of light transport aircraft
- List of racing aircraft
- List of regional airliners
