= Gulfstream G400/G500/G600 =

Business jet family

G400 / G500 / G600
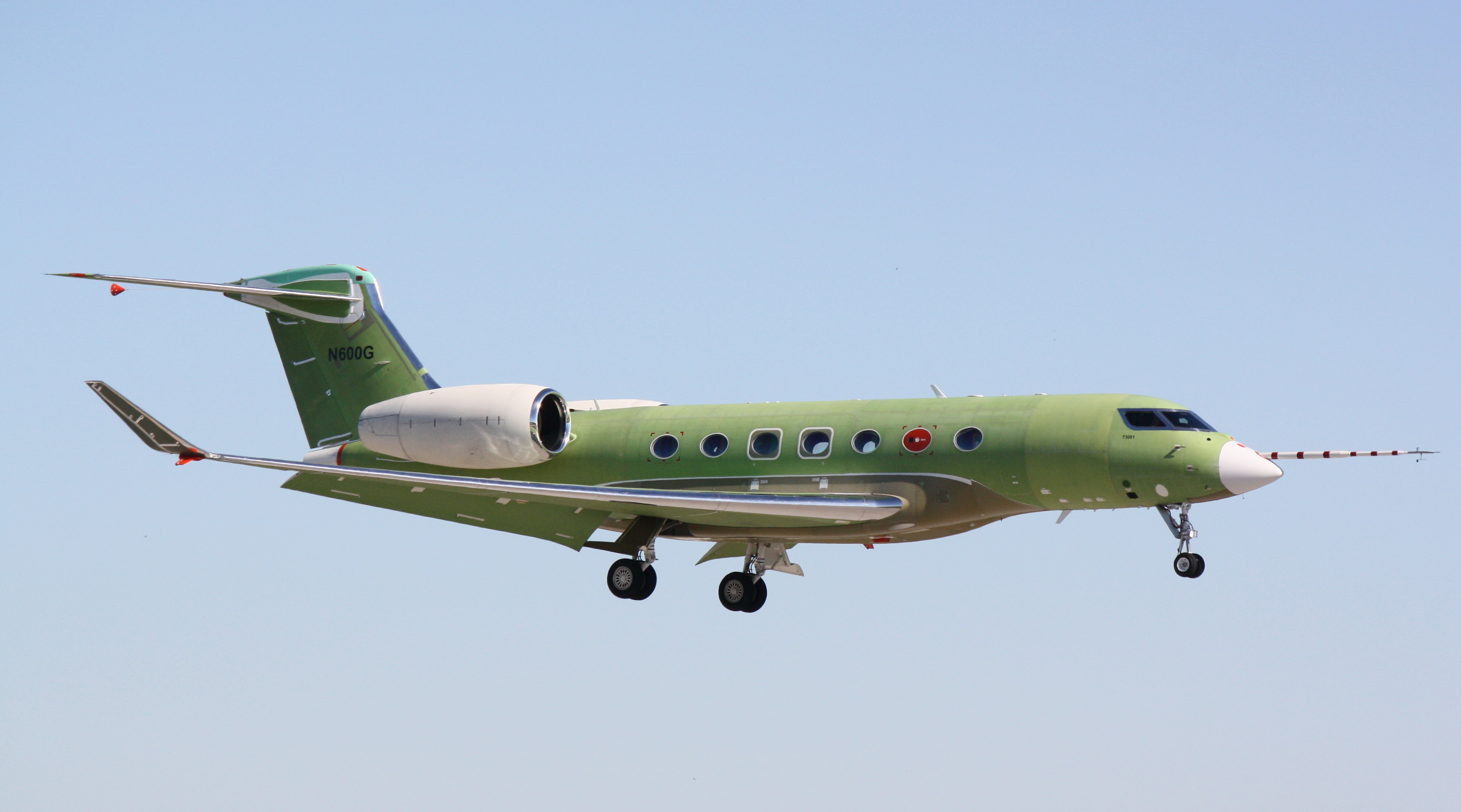
- G600 test aircraft in flight

General information
- Type: Business jet
- National origin: United States
- Manufacturer: Gulfstream Aerospace
- Status: In service
- Number built: G400: 4 G500: 125+ G600: 200+ G500+G600: 400

History
- Manufactured: 2014–present
- Introduction date: G500: Sept. 27, 2018; G600: Aug. 8, 2019
- First flight: G400: Aug. 15, 2024; G500: May 18, 2015; G600: Dec. 17, 2016

The Gulfstream G400, G500, and G600 (GVII) are American twin-engine business jets designed and produced by Gulfstream Aerospace. The aircraft are designated Gulfstream GVII-G500 and GVII-G600 in their type certificate.

The two larger models were unveiled on October 14, 2014 and the smaller G400 was unveiled on October 4, 2021. The G500 was first delivered on September 27, 2018, and the longer G600 was first delivered August 8, 2019. The G500 replaces the G450 while the larger G600 succeeds the G550. The smaller G400 meanwhile has not yet been certified, and is not expected to go into production until 2025.

Powered by two Pratt & Whitney Canada PW800 turbofans with a maximum takeoff weight (MTOW) of 79,600 lb (36.1 t), the G500 has a range of 5,300 nautical miles [nmi] (9,800 km; 6,100 mi), while the 94,600 lb (42.9 t) G600 can cover 6,600 nmi (12,220 km; 7,600 mi) at a speed of Mach 0.85.

== Development ==
Both aircraft were unveiled by Gulfstream Aerospace on October 14, 2014 During the second quarter of 2017, 80% of Gulfstream orders were for the G500/G600.

In January 2026, the Gulfstream G500 and G600 received certification from the European Union Aviation Safety Agency (EASA) for steep-approach landing capability, allowing operations at additional airports with steep terminal procedures, such as London City Airport and Lugano Airport.

=== G500 ===
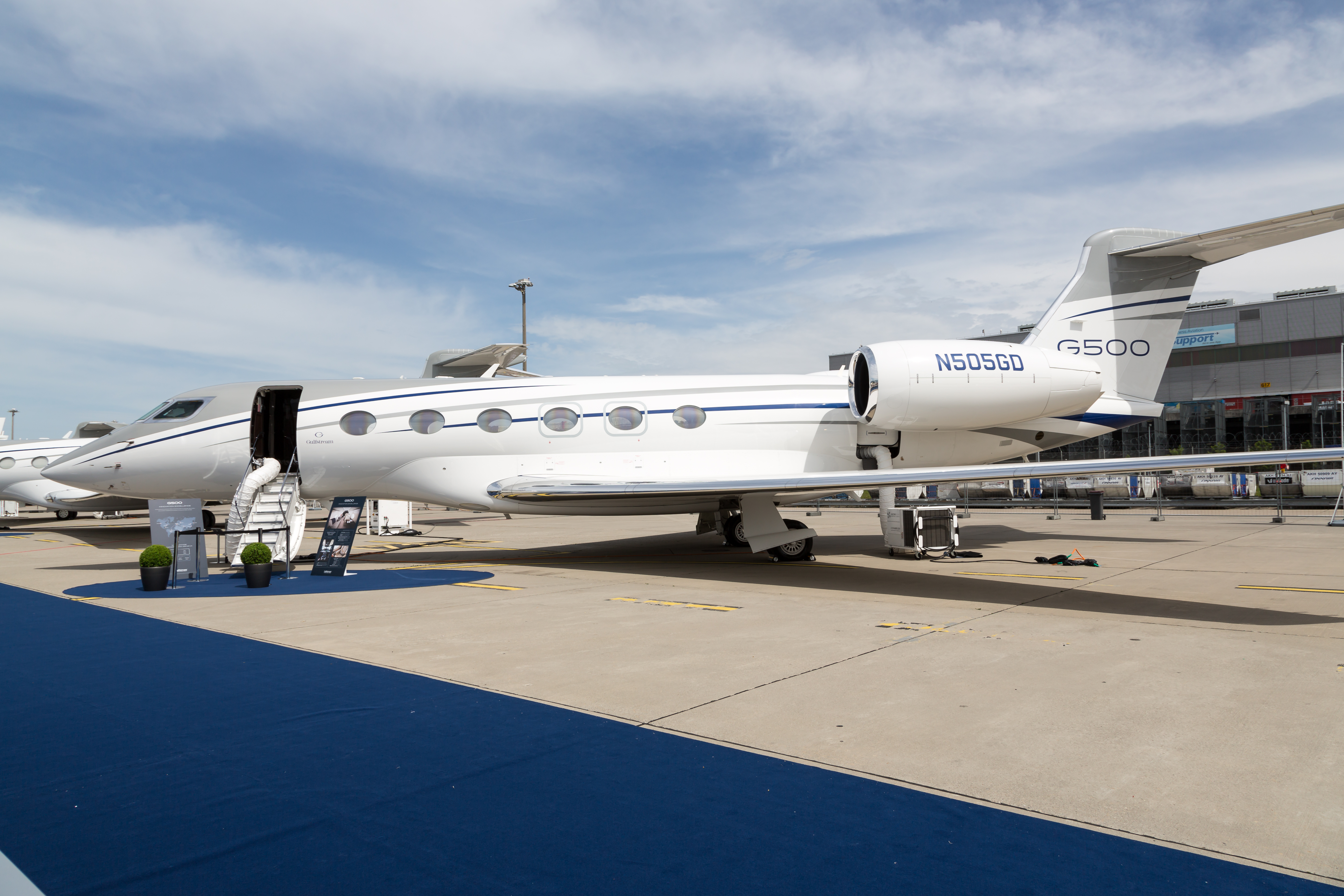
G500 at EBACE 2018

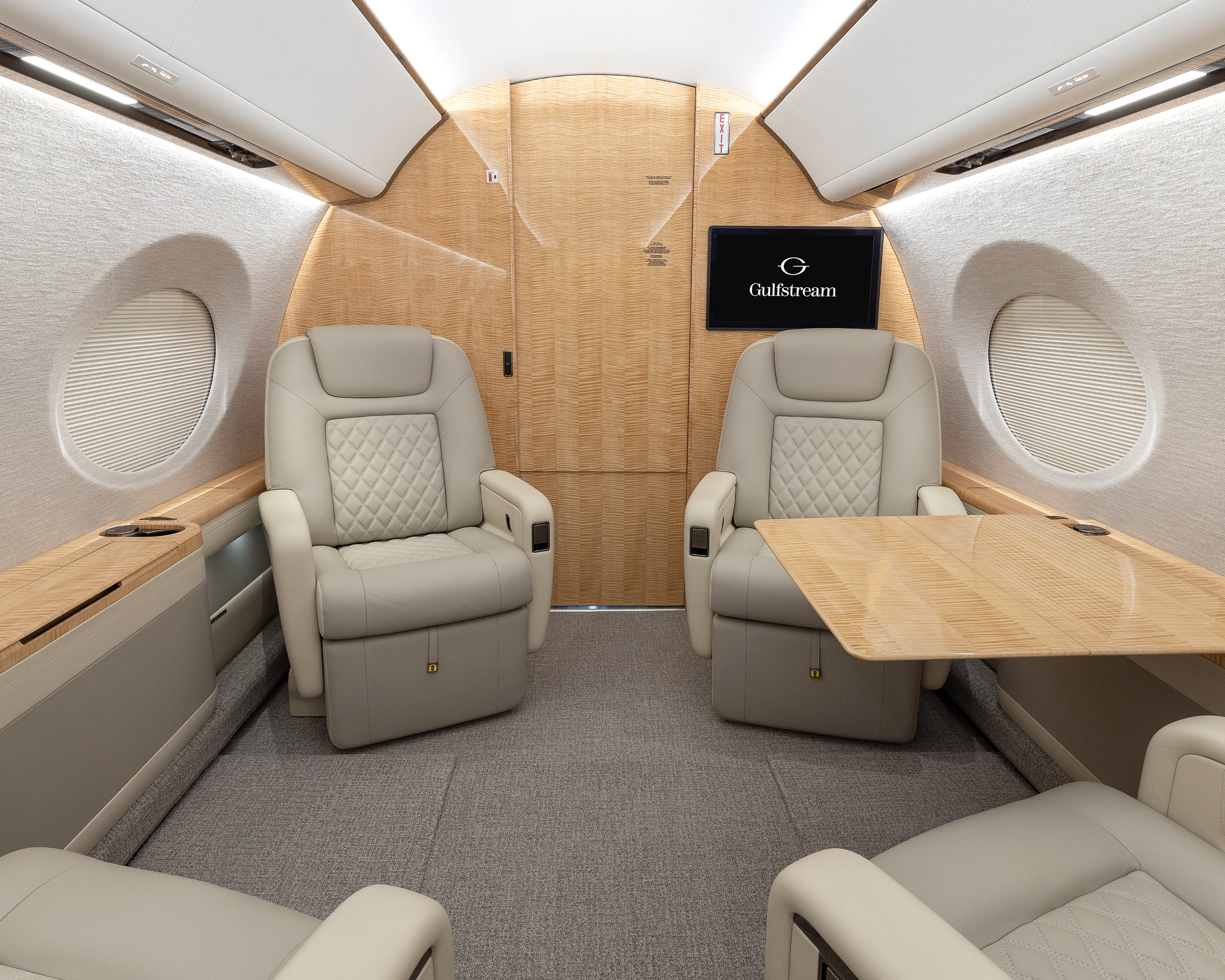
Gulfstream GVII-G500 interior

The G500 was taxiing under its own power at its unveiling on October 14, 2014, and it first flew on May 18, 2015. The model was planned for certification in 2017. In May 2017, the test fleet of four G500 prototypes and the first production aircraft, made over 745 flights in two years for 2,900 flight hours, on track for the certification by the end of the year.

In August 2017, the FAA issued the G500 a type inspection authorization to allow in flight evaluation. The five G500 test aircraft have logged more than 3,100 hours over 820 sorties and completed cabin systems, brakes, lighting, fly-over noise and fuel systems tests. The fifth G500, with a complete interior, will be the first to enter service, as a demonstrator, before customer deliveries in early 2018. Through August 20, the G500s had flown 3,460 h over 905 flights, reaching Mach 0.995 and FL530.

For the October 2017 NBAA show, the five G500s were completing their campaign with 995 flights and 3,690 h - 10 h 19 min for the longest - the first delivery schedule was maintained as certification was pushed until early 2018. Mach 0.85 range for the G500 was extended by 200 nmi to 5,200 nmi/9,630 km and by 600 nmi/1,111 km to 4,400 nmi/8,149 km at Mach 0.90.

The 300 flights hours of function and reliability testing required for FAA type certification was to be completed in summer 2018 after 240 were done at the end of May 2018 covering 100,300 nmi in 69 flights, along known icing flight and high-elevation certification tests: the five flight-test G500s made 1,355 flights in 4,955 hours.

On July 20, 2018, Gulfstream announced it received both its type certification and production certificate from the FAA, before first delivery in the fourth quarter. As nacelle supplier Nordam filed for bankruptcy on 23 July, initial deliveries will be slowed. Certification allowed the EFVS to provide the only visual cues for landing down to 1,000 ft (300 m) runway visual range, to touchdown and rollout, after 50 test approaches, and testing to lower visibilities could allow dropping the limit.

The first G500 was delivered on September 27, 2018. On October 1, Gulfstream announced the acquisition of the nacelle manufacturing line from Nordam.

In 2022, its equipped price was $49.5M.

=== G600 ===
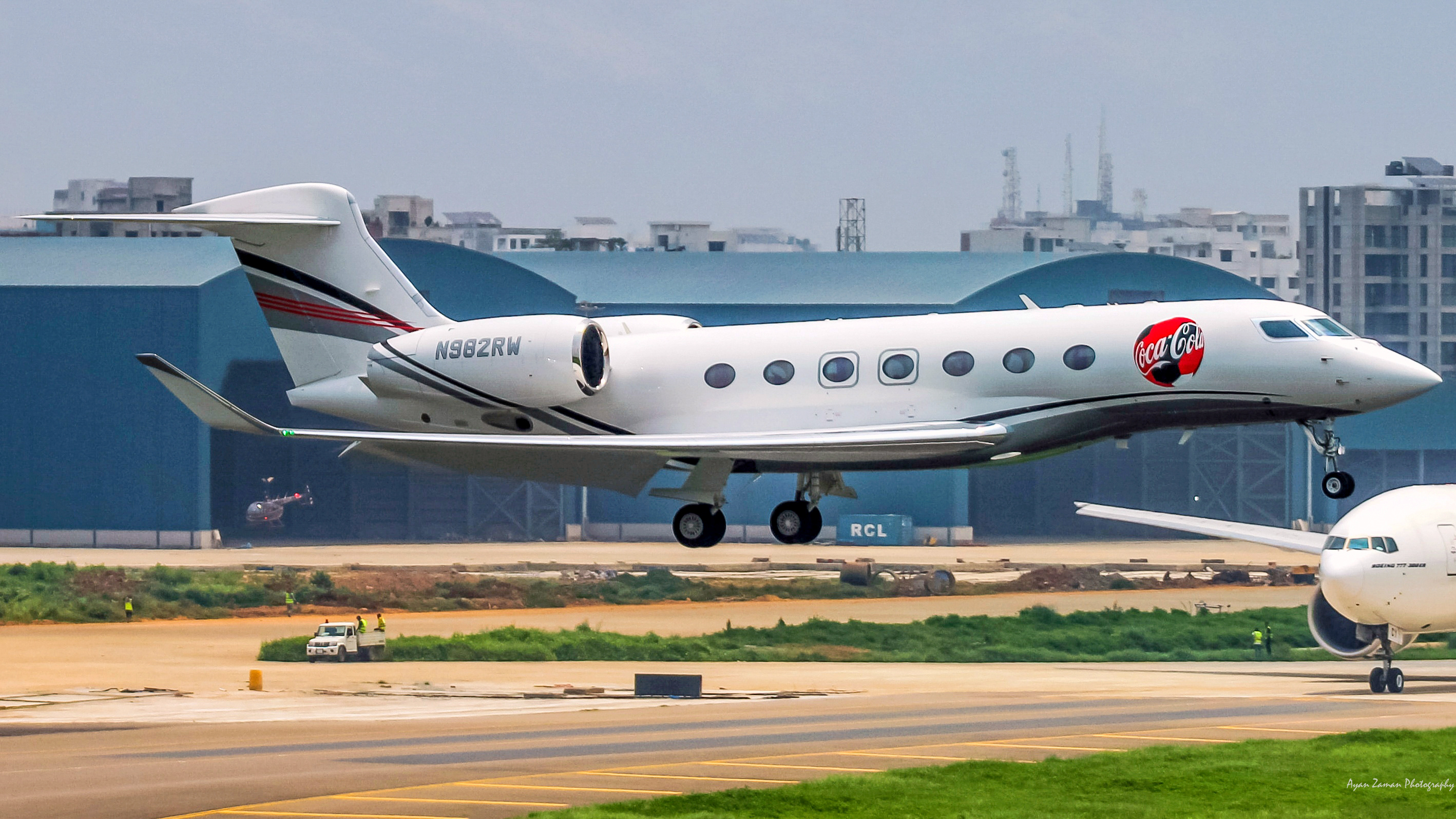
G600 Final approach

The longer G600 had its first flight at Savannah/Hilton Head International Airport on December 17, 2016. Four flight-test aircraft and a production G600 will be used for the test program for a scheduled 2018 introduction:

- T1, which flew 311 hours in five months, will test brakes development, flying qualities, stall speeds, air data and RVSM;
- T2, which has 52 flight hours in two months, will focus on loads, climb performance, flyover noise and function and reliability testing;
- T3 first flew on May 5, 2017, and will be used for field performance, ice protection, cabin pressurization and oxygen system testing;
- T4 will test automatic flight control systems, avionics and the fuel system;
- P1, the first production G600, will test cabin systems and the production interior.

In August 2017, the fifth was being outfitted for its third quarter first flight. Through August 20, the four G600s have logged 780 h in 175 flights, the longest lasting 13 h 5 min, it completed testing for initial flight envelope expansion and flying qualities, flutter, brakes, low speed or stall, loads calibration, parameter identification and climb performance, the fifth test aircraft will fly later in the quarter.

For the October 2017 NBAA show, five G600s were flying as it was to be introduced in early 2019. Range for the G600 was extended by 300 nmi/556 km for both Mach 0.85 to 6,500 nmi/12,038 km and Mach 0.90 to 5,100 nmi/9,445 km. In October 2018, Mach 0.9 range was increased again to 5,500 nmi (6,300 mi; 10,200 km).

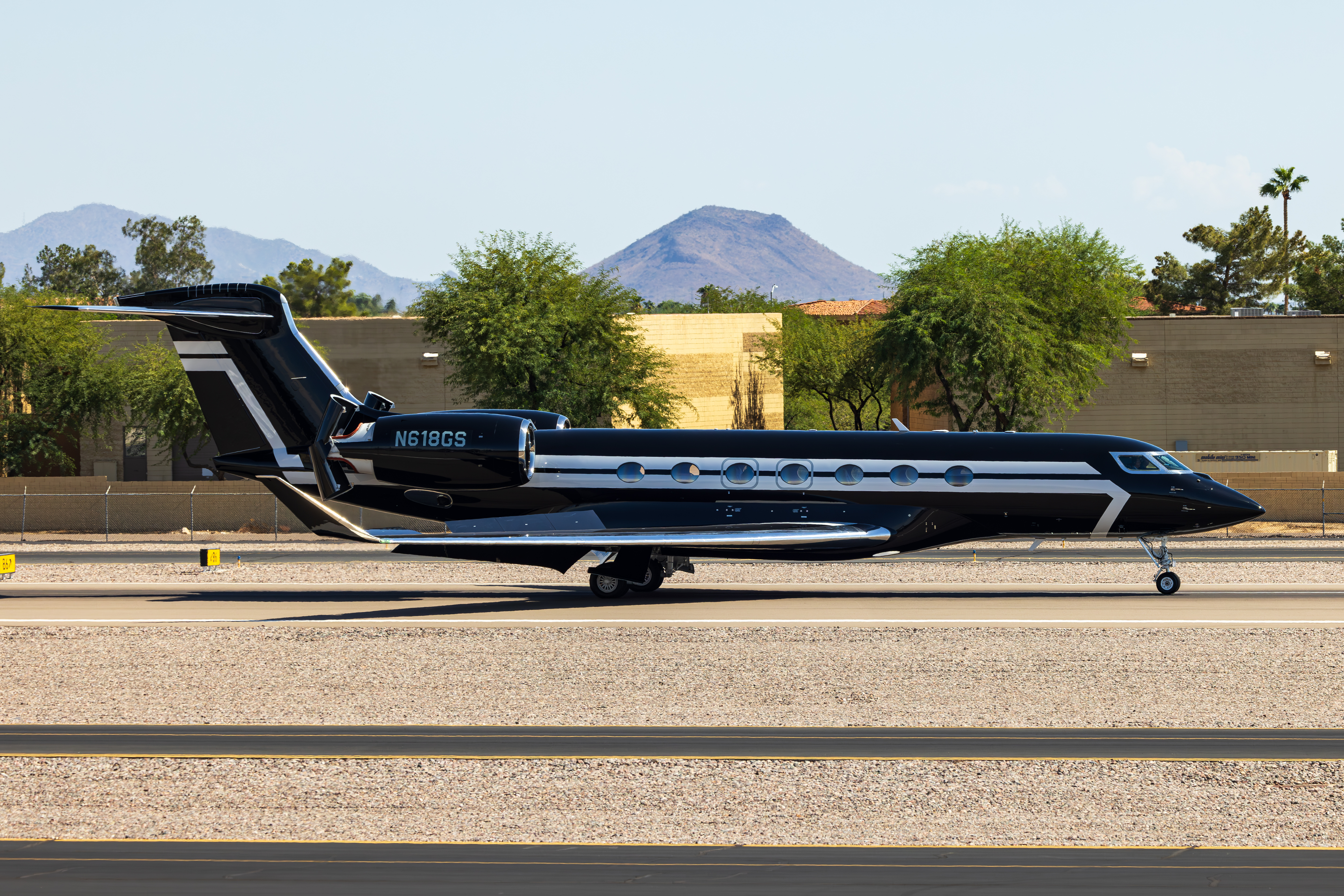
A Gulfstream G600 landing at Scottsdale Airport, Arizona, in 2023

Certification and introduction for the G600 was to happen in 2018 like the G500. The five flight-test G600s accumulated 1,950 hours in 510 flights, were completing mechanical systems certification testing in May 2018 before airfield-performance testing in summer. By August, 600 flights over 2,290 hours were completed after trials for ice shapes and stall speed testing and before field-performance testing, towards U.S. approval by year-end and deliveries in 2019. By October, the test aircraft had accumulated 685 flights in over 2,600 hours. The FAA's rigorous review delayed the certification as the test program had logged more than 3,150h over 840 flights by the end of April 2019, and approval was targeted before the end of June for a second half of 2019 service entry.

On June 28, 2019, Gulfstream announced the G600 type and production certificates from the FAA. The first G600 was delivered on August 8, 2019. The first EASA-certified G600 was delivered in December 2020 to an Austrian operator.

In 2022, its equipped price was $59.5M.

=== G400 ===
On October 4, 2021, Gulfstream introduced the 4,200 nmi (7,780 km) range G400, powered by Pratt & Whitney PW812GA engines with deliveries planned for 2025. Priced at $34.5 million, the G400 has a shortened G500 fuselage, with 2.5 zones and 10 windows, instead of 3 zones and 12 windows (the G600 has 3.5 zones and 14 windows). By March 2022 the prototype was not yet rolled out, so Gulfstream was anticipating a more extensive flight-test and certification campaign for the five test aircraft, as the G400 is powered by a different PW800 variant and the US government strengthened some certification requirements after the Boeing 737 Max groundings, but the 2025 first delivery goal remained. First flight occurred in August 2024.

== Design ==
The G500 replaces the G450, flying nearly 30 knots (56 km/h) faster and 18% farther with the same fuel burn. The larger G600 succeeds the G550.

=== Airframe ===
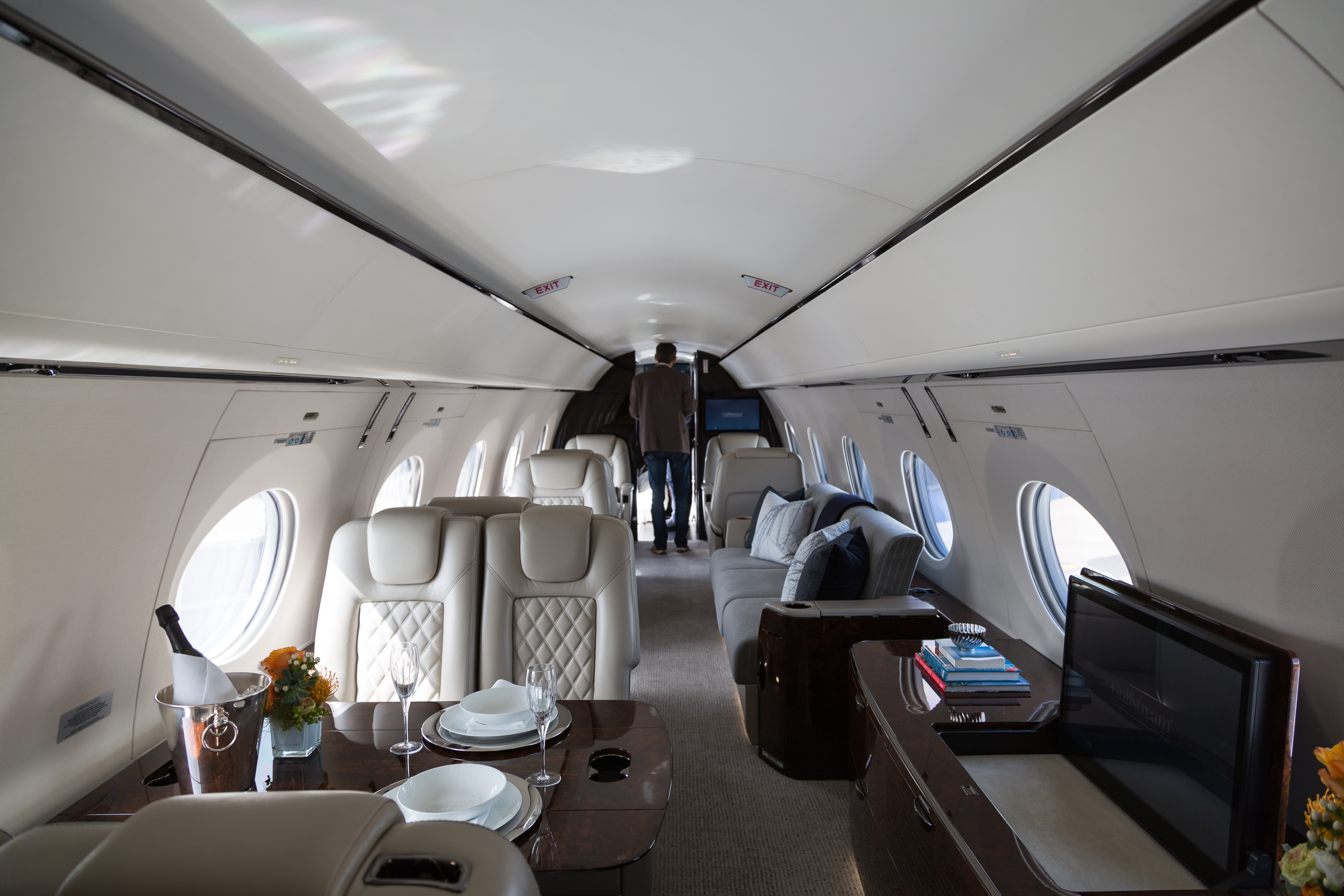
G500 cabin

Both models have a four circular arcs cross-section fuselage, similar to the Gulfstream G650, with a 7 in (18 cm) reduction in width and height. Similar in dimension to the Dassault Falcon, the G500/600 have 2 in (5.1 cm) more headroom, 7 in (18 cm) more cabin width and 8 in (20 cm) more floor width than Gulfstream's G450 and G550. The fuselage has an external height of 8 ft 4 in (2.54 m), and width of 8 ft 5 in (2.57 m). The production G500 has 14 windows, two more than prototype models. The G600 cabin is 3.7 ft (1.1 m) longer than the G500, allowing up to four passenger zones or three 8.75 ft (2.67 m) long zones, a longer galley and a forward crew rest.

The wing is a supercritical design with a 0.87 to 0.88 drag divergence Mach number depending upon lift coefficient. It is based on the G650 wing design with the same 36° sweep. The G600 wingspan is 8 ft (2.4 m) wider than the G500, allowing for 11,250 lb (5,100 kg) of additional fuel. Both models have a new tail design based on the aerodynamic shape and systems of the G650 tail.

The airframe is primarily high strength aluminum alloys with limited use of steel and titanium alloys. The horizontal stabilizer, fairings, main landing gear doors, rudder and elevators, radome, rear pressure bulkhead and winglets are composite materials. The semi-monocoque fuselage structure is made of stressed skin, frame and longeron.

=== Engines ===
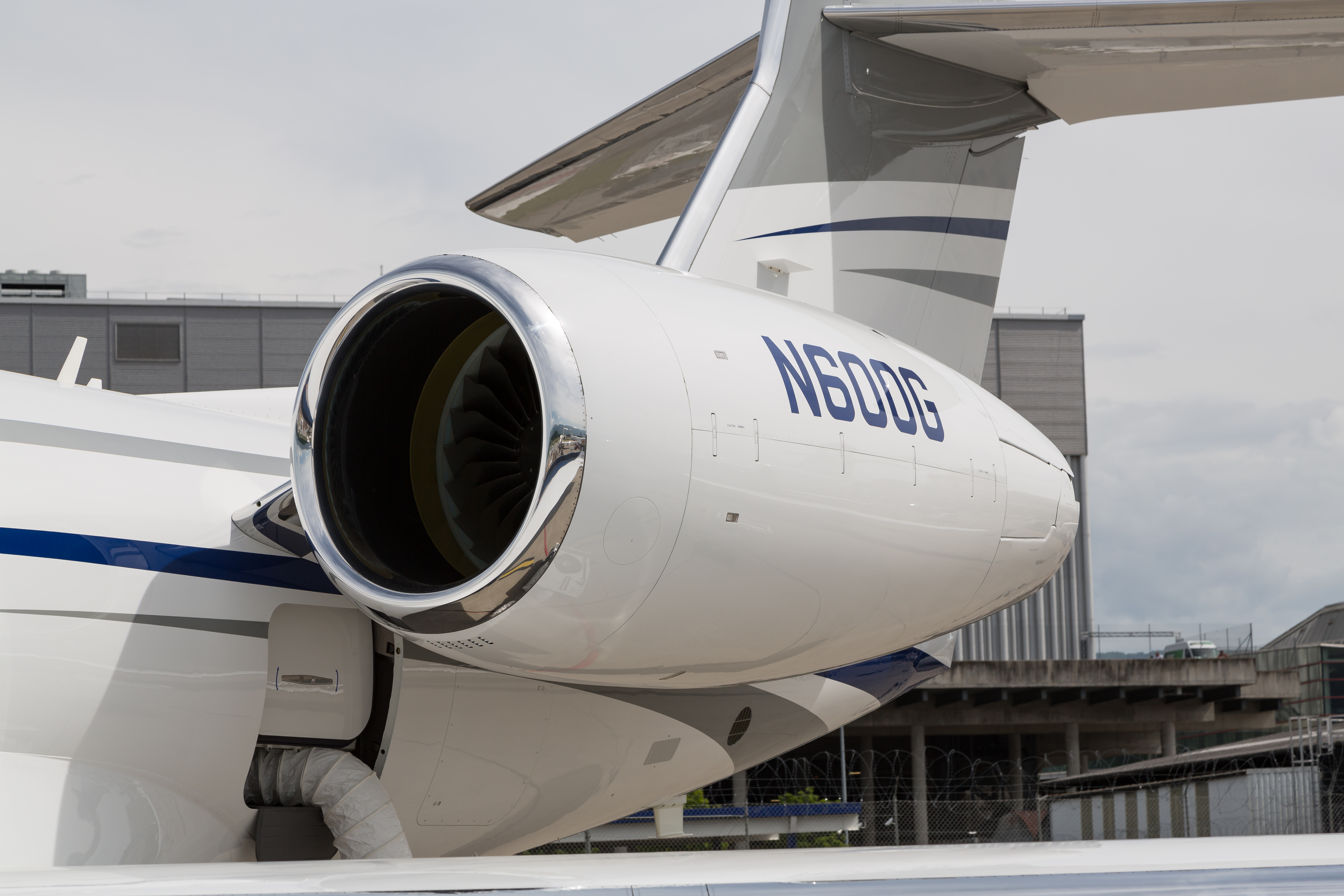
PW815 on a G600

The G500/G600 is powered by the Pratt & Whitney Canada PW800 series turbofan engines (PW814GA for G500 and PW815GA for G600) originally conceived for the Cessna Citation Columbus program. The PW800 is based on the Pratt & Whitney Geared Turbofan core without gear reduction. The departure from Rolls-Royce Aero Engines is rare for Gulfstream. For the G500 cruising at FL400, ISA -5 °C, total fuel flow is 2,920 lb (1,320 kg)/h at M0.90/510 kn (945 km/h) TAS, 2,400 lb (1,090 kg)/h at M0.85/476 kn (882 km/h; 548 mph) TAS. At FL450, Mach 0.90/506 kn (582 mph; 937 km/h) TAS and ISA -8 °C, it burns 2,600 lb (1,200 kg)/h.

At Mach 0.90, 512 kn (589 mph; 948 km/h) TAS, the G600 burns 2,960 lb (1,340 kg) per h at FL430, ISA-3 °C and a weight of 62,300 lb (28,300 kg), compared to a 3,100 lb (1,400 kg) per h book value. At Mach 0.85 479 kn (887 km/h; 551 mph) TAS, the same G600 burns 2,200 lb (1,000 kg) per h at FL470, ISA-10 °C and a weight of 62,000 lb (28,000 kg), below the 2,309 lb (1,047 kg) prediction.

=== Systems ===
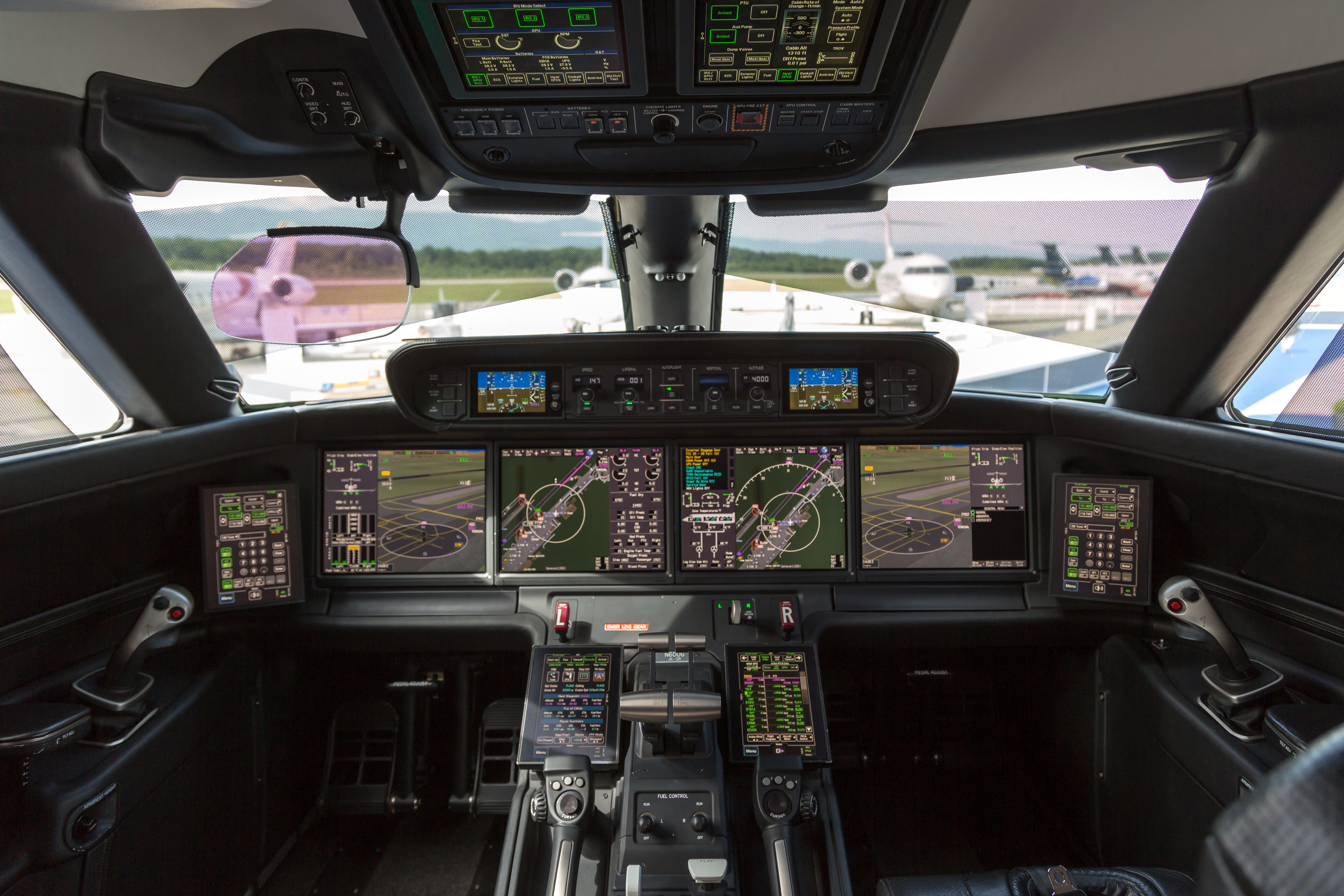
G600 flight deck

Electric and hydraulic systems are from the G650, as well as the digital air data computers, secondary power distribution with electronics, cabin acoustical treatment, primary avionics, satcom, and improved cabin management system. The digital fly-by-wire system is similar except for new active control sidesticks and dual channel remote electronic units which replace single channel units from G650. The oxygen, cabin pressurization, landing gear control, aircraft health and trend monitoring systems are adapted from the G650. The auxiliary power unit is a Honeywell HTG400G. The cabin pressurization reaches 10.69 psi (0.737 bar).

It is equipped with BAE Systems active sidesticks, appearing mechanically linked by being electrically back-driven, the first civil aircraft to be so equipped. The Honeywell Symmetry Flight Deck features four portrait main displays, three touchscreens on the overhead panel instead of stand-alone switches; there are four force-touchscreens in the glareshield and left and right touch standby displays at each seat. The enhanced flight vision system is displayed through 42×30° field-of-view head-up display.

== Operators ==
=== Civil ===
The G500 and G600 are primarily operated by private individuals and companies. Companies operating the G600 include Honeywell, Coca-Cola and BMW. Companies operating the G500 include General Dynamics, Procter & Gamble and Eli Lilly and Company.

=== Government and military ===
Algeria

- Algerian Air Force: Operates one G600.

Pakistan

- Pakistan Army: Operates one G600.
- Punjab Government: Operates one G500.

== Specifications ==
Model	G400	G500	G600
Cockpit crew	Two		
Capacity	12	19	
Length	86 ft 3 in (26.29 m)	91 ft 2 in (27.79 m)	96 ft 1 in (29.29 m)
Wingspan	86 ft 4 in (26.31 m)	86 ft 4 in (26.31 m)	94 ft 2 in (28.70 m)
Height	25 ft 4 in (7.72 m)	25 ft 6 in (7.77 m)	25 ft 3 in (7.70 m)
Cabin length	36 ft 4 in (11.07 m)	41 ft 6 in (12.65 m)	45 ft 2 in (13.77 m)
Cabin cross section	Height: 6 ft 2 in (1.88 m), Width: 7 ft 7 in (2.31 m)		
Cabin volume	1,441 cu ft (40.8 m^{3})	1,715 cu ft (48.6 m^{3})	1,884 cu ft (53.3 m^{3})
Baggage volume	175 cu ft (5.0 m^{3})		
Maximum takeoff weight (MTOW)	69,850 lb (31,680 kg)	79,600 lb (36,100 kg)	94,600 lb (42,900 kg)
Basic operating weight (BOW) (Note: Includes three crew members for the G400 and G500 while including four crew for the G600.)	43,100 lb (19,500 kg)	46,850 lb (21,250 kg)	50,900 lb (23,100 kg)
Maximum payload	4,050 lb (1,840 kg)	5,250 lb (2,380 kg)	6,540 lb (2,970 kg)
Fuel capacity	25,350 lb (11,500 kg)	30,250 lb (13,720 kg)	41,500 lb (18,800 kg)
Turbofans (x2)	P&WC PW812GA	P&WC PW814GA	P&WC PW815GA
Takeoff thrust (x2)	13,496 lbf (60.0 kN)	15,144 lbf (67.4 kN)	15,680 lbf (69.7 kN)
Range	4,200 nmi (7,778 km; 4,833 mi) (Note: At Mach 0.85, 8 pax, 3 crew, NBAA IFR reserves, unless otherwise noted.)	5,300 nmi (9,816 km; 6,099 mi) (Note: At Mach 0.85, 8 pax, 3 crew, NBAA IFR reserves, unless otherwise noted.)	6,600 nmi (12,223 km; 7,595 mi) (Note: At Mach 0.85, 8 pax, 4 crew, NBAA IFR reserves)
Cruise speed	Mach 0.85 – Mach 0.88 (488–505 kn; 903–935 km/h; 561–581 mph)	Mach 0.85 – Mach 0.90 (488–516 kn; 903–956 km/h; 561–594 mph)	
Max. operating speed, M_{MO}	Mach 0.90 (516 kn; 956 km/h; 594 mph)	Mach 0.925 (531 kn; 983 km/h; 611 mph)	
Takeoff distance (SL, ISA, MTOW)	5,000 ft (1,524 m)	5,300 ft (1,615 m)	5,700 ft (1,737 m)
Ceiling	51,000 ft (15,545 m) / Cabin altitude: 4,850 ft (1,480 m)		

== See also ==
Related development

- Gulfstream G650

Aircraft of comparable role, configuration, and era

- Bombardier Challenger 650
- Bombardier Global Express
- Dassault Falcon 2000LX
- Dassault Falcon 6X
- Dassault Falcon 7X/8X
