= Rotation (aeronautics) =

Beginning of flight, when an airplane's nose wheel lifts off to end the take-off roll

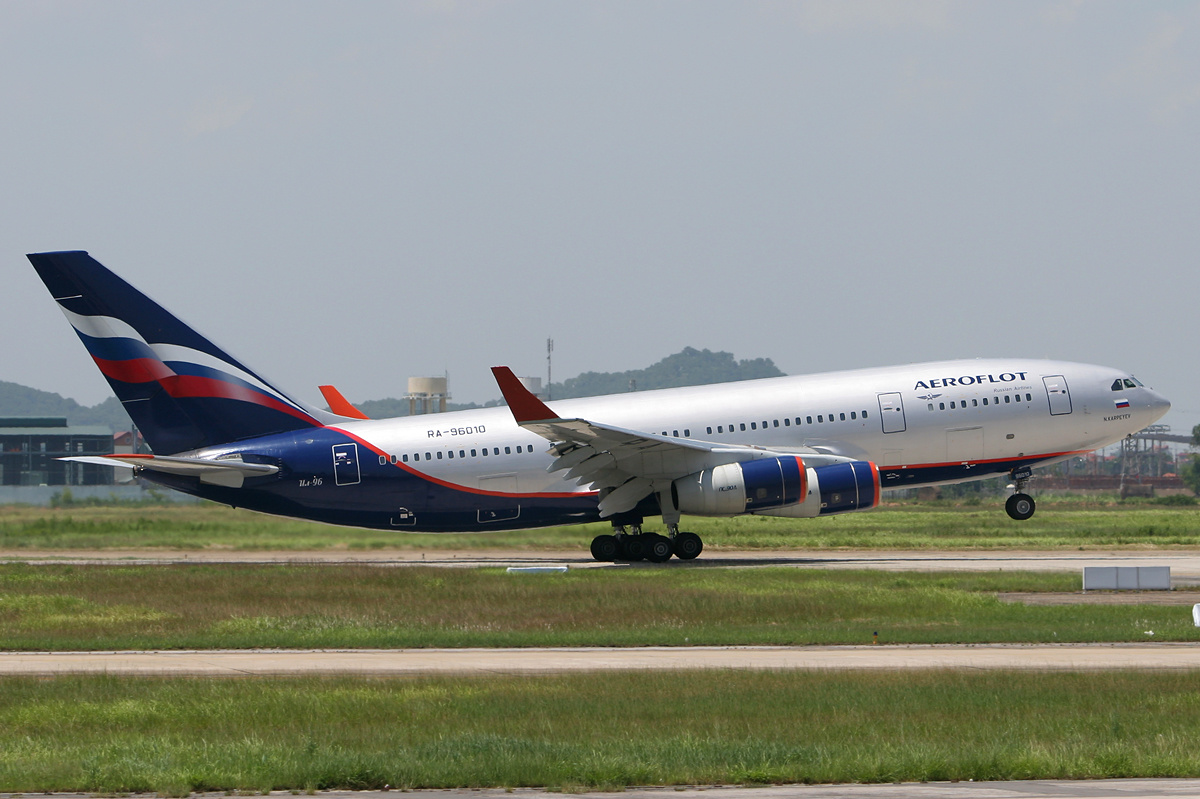
An Aeroflot Il-96 rotating

In aviation, rotation is the action of applying back pressure to a control device, such as a yoke, side-stick or centre stick, to lift the nose wheel off the ground during takeoff. An aircraft moves at any given moment in one or more of three axes: roll (the axis that runs the length of the fuselage), pitch (the axis running laterally through the wings), and yaw (the vertical axis around which the front of the aircraft turns to the left or right whilst its rear turns toward the opposite direction). Displacement along any of these axes is a form of rotation, but the term "rotation" in relation to takeoff is limited to the moment during which the aircraft's nose rises from the ground: the aircraft rotates around its lateral axis.

The first critical speed during takeoff (at which a pilot must decide whether to continue with takeoff or abort it) is called the "decision speed", or V_{1}, beyond which it would be unsafe to abort the takeoff. Rotation is begun at the speed known as V_{R}. Rotation at the correct speed and to the correct angle is important for safety reasons and to minimise takeoff distance. After rotation, the aircraft continues to accelerate until it reaches its liftoff speed V_{LO}, at which point it leaves the runway. After liftoff, a speed V_{2} will be called out, being the speed at which the aircraft is able to climb at a sufficient rate to reach its cruising altitude, and therefore at which the gear will be retracted.

Premature rotation or over-rotation can cause a tailstrike, which can damage the underside of the tail unless prevented by a protection device such as a tailskid or tail bumper. A certification test is required to show that a new aircraft design will still take off safely with the tail dragging on the runway. Using a higher V_{R} will increase tail clearance and reduce the probability of tailstrike. Over-rotation can also result in loss of lift, causing a stall.

== Comparison ==
Aircraft with tricycle landing gear (with nosewheel) rotate. The on-ground angle of attack of the wing has to be established during the design phase. The main and nose-gear leg lengths are chosen to give a negative angle of attack relative to the ground. This ensures that the wing has negative lift until the pilot rotates the aircraft to a positive angle of attack. During landing, the reverse happens when the nose-wheel touches the runway and the wing assumes a negative angle of attack with no lift.

Aircraft with the less-common "conventional landing gear" (with tailwheel) do not rotate. The pilot initially pushes forward on the yoke during the takeoff run, lifting the tailwheel off the runway, and the aircraft lifts off the runway when sufficient speed is achieved.
