= Cessna Citation Hemisphere =

Business jet aircraft project

Citation Hemisphere

General information
- Type: Corporate Jet
- National origin: United States
- Manufacturer: Textron Aviation
- Status: development suspended (July 2019)

The Cessna Citation Hemisphere was a business jet project by Cessna. Announced in November 2015, it was expected to fly in 2019 but its development was suspended in April 2018 due to a delay in the development of its Safran Silvercrest engines. It was designed for Mach 0.9 and a 4,500 nautical miles (5,200 mi; 8,300 km) range.

== Development ==
The aircraft was announced at the 2015 National Business Aviation Association (NBAA) conference with the widest cabin in its class, and was expected to fly in 2019.

Selection of the Snecma Silvercrest, with over 12,000 lbf (53 kN) thrust, was announced at the 2016 NBAA Convention, along with the Honeywell Primus Epic cockpit and Thales Group fly-by-wire flight control system.

The Silvercrest axial-centrifugal high-pressure compressor architecture is common for engines below 7,000 lbf (31 kN) but unusual for an engine with the higher thrust of the Silvercrest. Compressor operability problems made Dassault cancel its Silvercrest-powered Falcon 5X.

In April 2018, development was suspended pending future progress by Safran in managing the Silvercrest problems. In May 2018, Safran announced it had launched a high-pressure compressor redesign.

On October 15, 2018, fractional operator NetJets announced the purchase of up to 150 Hemispheres, priced at $35 million each, along 175 Citation Longitude, ordered for $26 million each.

In July 2019, Textron suspended development of the Hemisphere as the Silvercrest engines did not meet requirements. In October 2019, Textron reaffirmed that the project was still suspended, but not terminated.

== Specifications ==
Data from Citation Hemisphere

General characteristics

- Capacity: 12 passengers
- Fuselage diameter: 102 inches (260 cm)
- Powerplant: 2 × Safran Silvercrest turbofans, 12,000 lbf (53 kN) thrust each

Performance

- Cruise speed: 516 kn (594 mph, 956 km/h) mach 0.9
- Range: 4,500 nmi (5,200 mi, 8,300 km)
- Cabin Altitude: 5,000 ft (1,500 m)

== See also ==
Related development

- Cessna Citation series
- Cessna Citation Columbus

Aircraft of comparable role, configuration, and era

- Bombardier Challenger 650
- Dassault Falcon 2000LXS/EX
- Dassault Falcon 900
