= Dassault Falcon family =

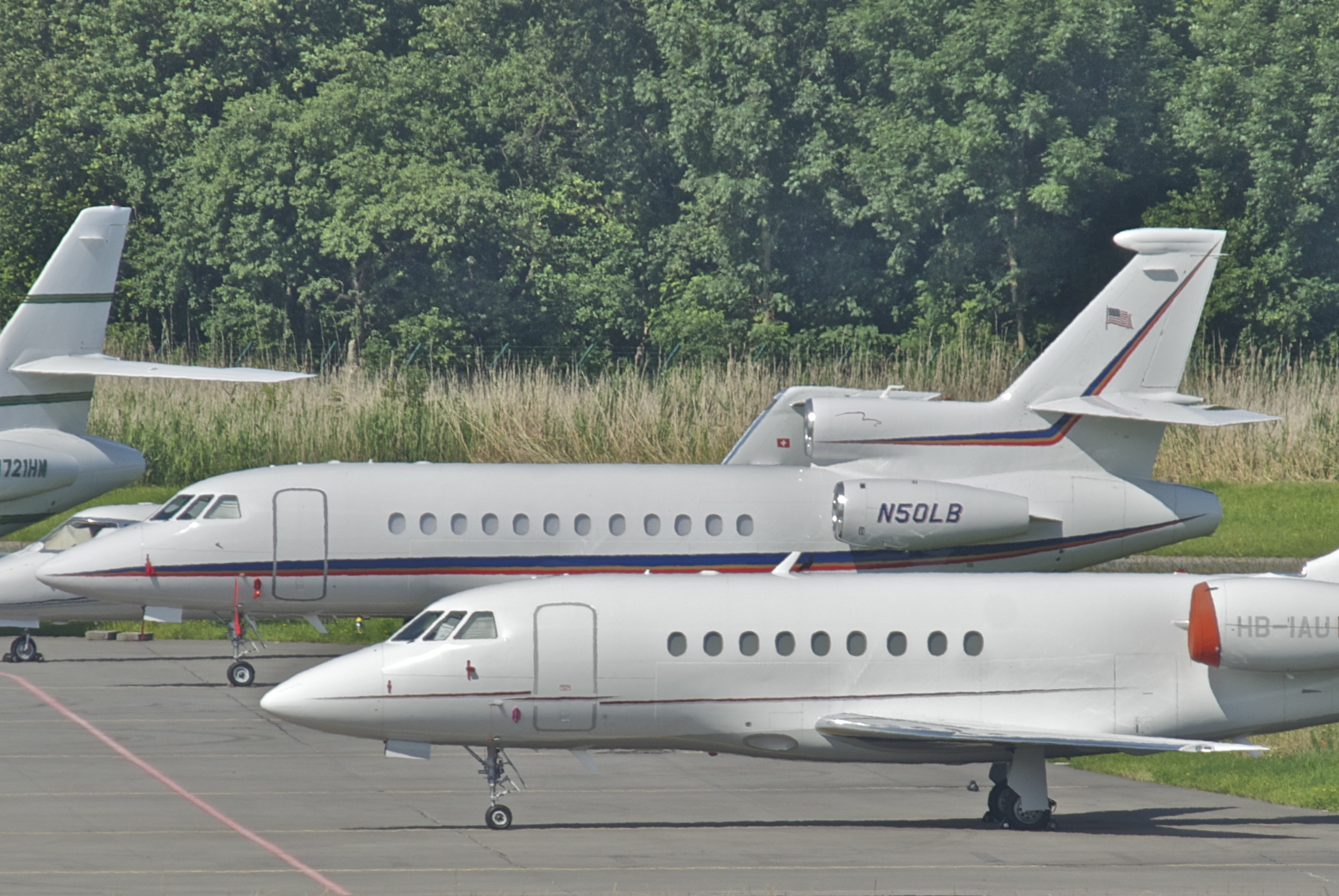
A Falcon 900 behind a Falcon 2000

The Dassault Falcon is a family of business jets, manufactured by Dassault Aviation. Dassault produce the midsize Falcon 2000S/LXS twinjet, the long-range Falcon 6X twinjet and Falcon 900LX trijet, and ultra-long range Dassault Falcon 7X/8X trijets.

The first Falcon 20 took off on its first flight on 4 May 1963, and was handed over to a customer in 1965. The Falcon 900 was rolled out in 1984, and the Falcon 7X made its first flight in 2005. The 2,000th Falcon was delivered in 2009, and the Falcon 8X made its first flight in 2015. The 2,500th Falcon was delivered in July 2017, as more than 2,100 were in service with 1,230 operators in 90 countries, having accumulated 17.8 million flight hours.

In 2018, Dassault launched the Falcon 6X with a 5,500 nmi (10,200 km) range. By May 2023, more than 2,700 business jets have been delivered. The Falcon 10X is planned for certification in late 2025.

== Aircraft ==
Model	Intro.	End	Range	Description
Falcon 20/200	1963	1988	1,810 nm	original model in family of aircraft, later versions known as Falcon 200
Falcon 75	1968	project	2,000 km	Transonic (Mach 1.2) swing-wing, powered by two Pratt & Whitney JT8Ds.
Falcon 10/100	1970	1989	1,920 nm	scaled down Falcon 20, later versions known as Falcon 100
Falcon 30/40	1973	1975	1,150 nm	enlarged 30-seat Falcon 20, prototype only, Falcon 40 outside North America
Falcon 50	1976	2008	3,220 nm	trijet derived from the Falcon 20
Dassault Falcon 900	1984	2025	4,750 nm	trijet, larger cross section development of the Falcon 50
Dassault Falcon 2000	1993	current	4,150 nm	scaled down Falcon 900 twinjet
Dassault Falcon 7X	2005	current	5,950 nm	trijet, development of the Falcon 900 with its cross-section
Dassault Falcon 8X	2016	current	6,450 nm	larger, improved Falcon 7X
Dassault Falcon 5X	2017	2017	5,200 nm	new cross section twin jet discontinued due to Safran Silvercrest issues
Dassault Falcon 6X	2021	current	5,500 nm	longer, heavier 5X, announced in Feb. 2018
Dassault Falcon 10X	2025	planned	7,500 nm	wider cross section, longer, heavier, longer range.

== Timeline ==
Dassault Falcon timeline
1960s							1970s										1980s										1990s										2000s										2010s										2020s
3	4	5	6	7	8	9	0	1	2	3	4	5	6	7	8	9	0	1	2	3	4	5	6	7	8	9	0	1	2	3	4	5	6	7	8	9	0	1	2	3	4	5	6	7	8	9	0	1	2	3	4	5	6	7	8	9	0	1	2	3	4	5
Falcon 20⁑
							Falcon 10⁑
													Falcon 50⁂
																					Falcon 900⁂
																														Falcon 2000⁑
																																										Falcon 7X/8X⁂
																																																						5X⁑ ... 6X⁑
																																																														10X⁑
cross section:										= Falcon 20										= Falcon 900										= Falcon 5X										= Falcon 10X										⁑: twinjet										⁂: trijet
