= Nordam =

American aerospace company

NORDAM
- Type: Private company
- Industry: Aerospace
- Founded: 1969
- Founder: Ray H. Siegfried II
- Headquarters: Tulsa, Oklahoma, United States
- Owner: The family of Ray H. Siegfried II and The Carlyle Group
- Number of employees: >2,300 (2019)
- Website: nordam.com

NORDAM, or Northern Oklahoma Research, Design, and Manufacturing is an American aerospace company. It concentrates on Interiors, Structures, Nacelle & Thrust Reverser Systems, Repair & Transparency.

== History ==
NORDAM was founded in 1969 by Ray H. Siegfried II.

President and CEO Charles B. Ryan was killed in a plane crash in 2001.

In 2018 NORDAM filed for bankruptcy.

In 2018 NORDAM halted production of nacelles for the Pratt & Whitney Canada PW800 due to a contract dispute with Pratt & Whitney Canada. In order to recover its financial position NORDAM sold the Pratt & Whitney Canada PW800 nacelle program to Gulfstream Aerospace.

In 2019 NORDAM exited bankruptcy through a cash injection from The Carlyle Group which resulted in Carlyle becoming a 45% shareholder in the company.

== Operations ==
In 2019 NORDAM had 1,800 employees in the Tulsa area and 500 elsewhere.

In 2022 NORDAM opened a major MRO facility at Taoyuan which will serve as their regional hub replacing operations in Singapore. The Taoyuan operation is a joint venture with China Airlines.
