= Pratt & Whitney Canada PW800 =

Turbofan engine

PW800
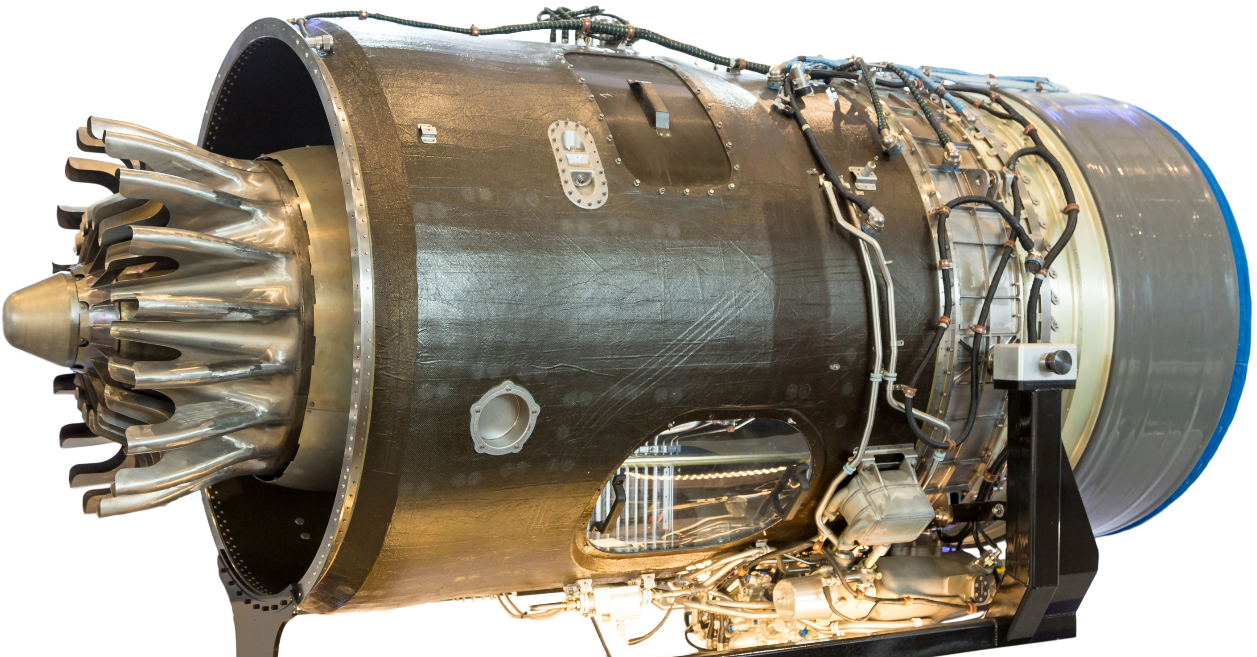
- Type: Turbofan
- National origin: Canada
- Manufacturer: Pratt & Whitney Canada
- First run: April 2012
- Major applications: Gulfstream G400/G500/G600; Dassault Falcon 6X

The Pratt & Whitney Canada PW800 is a series of turbofan engines in the 10,000–20,000 lbf (44–89 kN) thrust class, manufactured by Pratt & Whitney Canada. Intended for the regional jet and business jet market, the gear-less PW800 shares a common core with the larger, geared PW1000G. The first variants were certified on February 15, 2015, to power the new Gulfstream G500/G600. A later variant was certified in 2021 for the Dassault Falcon 6X.

== Development ==
The development of the PW800 stretches back to demonstration projects in 1999, soon after the development of the PW600 very light engine and the PW300 business jet engine. After the Advanced Technology Fan Integrator demonstrator first ran on March 17, 2001, which became the PW1000G, Pratt & Whitney Canada was searching for a launch customer for the initially geared PW800, in the 10,000–19,000 lbf (44–85 kN) thrust range, bridging the gap between P&WC's PW300 and P&W's PW6000, intended for the regional- and business-jet engine market.

The PW800 core was to be the basis for the Pratt & Whitney Canada PW180, a 12,000 shaft horsepower (8,900 kilowatts) turboprop engine proposed for the Airbus A400M Atlas. However the Europrop TP400 was selected instead.

Pratt & Whitney Canada showcased at the 2007 Paris Air Show its PW-10X engine development, within the 10,000-pound-thrust-class among the Rolls-Royce RB282, General Electric CF34 successor which became the General Electric Passport, Snecma Silvercrest and Honeywell pushing its HTF10000 development of the HTF7000.

=== PW810 for the Citation Columbus ===
In 2008, the PW810 variant was announced as the engine for the Cessna Citation Columbus business jet with an anticipated first flight of 2011. However Cessna canceled the program in 2009, which halted the PW810 program, but Pratt & Whitney continued the PW800 series development.

Pratt & Whitney announced that the core high pressure spool with eight compressor and two turbine stages should start testing before the end of 2009. In December 2009, PWC announced that the core testing had begun. It made its first run in April 2012 and first flew in April 2013.

=== PW814/815 for the Gulfstream G500/G600 ===
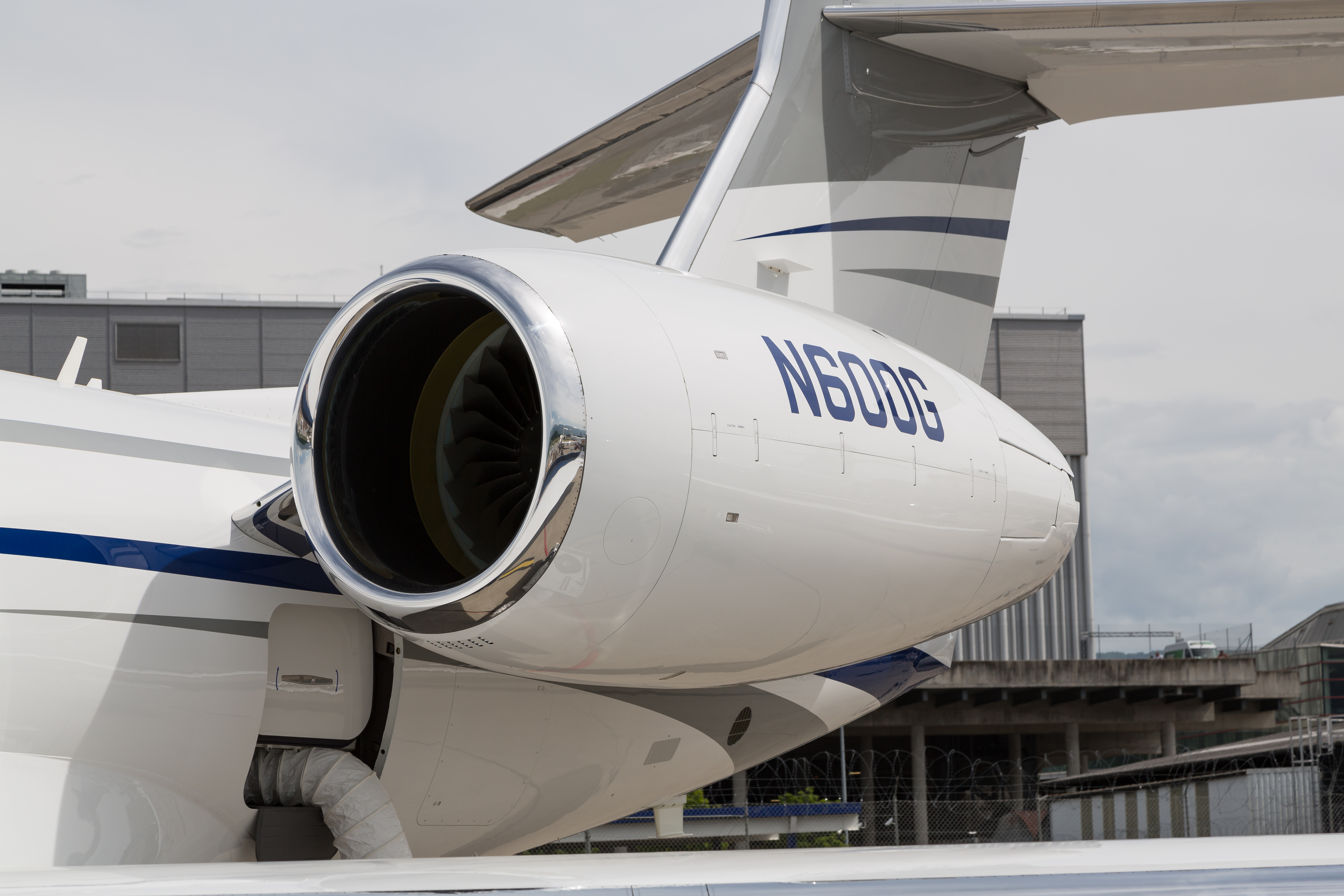
PW815 on a Gulfstream G600

On October 20, 2014, the engine was selected by Gulfstream for its new Gulfstream G500/G600. Pratt & Whitney Canada (P&WC) announced on February 17, 2015, that it had received Transport Canada type certification for its PW814GA and PW815GA engines, which will power the new Gulfstream G500 (5,300 nmi range) and G600 (6,600 nmi range) business jets, respectively.

On May 18, 2015, the Gulfstream G500 took its first flight using the PW814A engine after the PW800 engine family has surpassed 3,600 hours of full engine testing, including rigorous endurance testing that simulates a multitude of aircraft missions and environments, and more than 470 hours on P&WC's 747 Flying Test Bed.

The United States Federal Aviation Administration validated the PW814GA and PW815GA type certificate on February 24, 2017. In May 2017, 13,000h of testing were completed, including 3,500h in flight. In October this rose to 16,600 hours and 16,800 cycles, the first shop visit is scheduled at 10,000 hours and it needs 20% fewer inspections and 40% lower on-wing maintenance than its competitors

In September 2018, the first Gulfstream G500 was delivered with the 14,000 lbf (62.3 kN) PW814. The Gulfstream G600 should be first delivered in June 2019, powered by the 15,000 lbf (67 kN) PW815.

=== PW812 for the Falcon 6X ===
The 12,000–13,000 lbf (53–58 kN) PW812D variant was selected for the Dassault Falcon 6X, replacing the cancelled 5X after troubles with its Safran Silvercrest engines, expecting a 2022 service entry. By May 2019, five test engines were tested over 1,000 h, including bird strikes, ice issues and blade off testing. By December 2021, a type certificate was issued by Transport Canada after more than 4,900h of testing, including more than 1,150h of flight testing, to allow the 6X to enter service on schedule in late 2022.

== Design ==
The PW800 was originally going to be a geared turbofan like the PW1000G. While the PW814/PW815 shares the core of the PW1500G (powering the Airbus A220) and the PW812D shares the core of the PW1200G (powering the Mitsubishi MRJ), neither model ultimately incorporated the reduction gear system.

The engine will feature the Technology for Advanced Low NOx (TALON) X combustor, allowing it to exceed International Civil Aviation Organization (ICAO) standards for NOx by 50%, Carbon monoxide (CO) by 35% and that the engine should meet upcoming stage IV aircraft noise requirements. A previous version of the TALON combustor is in service with the Pratt & Whitney PW4000.

MTU Aero Engines has a 15% share in the program, developing and producing various stage of the high-pressure compressor and the low-pressure turbine.

== Variants ==
PW810

- was to produce 8,830 lbf (39 kN) thrust to power the cancelled Cessna Citation Columbus.

PW812D

- powers the Dassault Falcon 6X business jet.

PW812GA

- powers the Gulfstream G400 business jet.

PW814GA

- powers the Gulfstream G500 business jet.

PW815GA

- powers the Gulfstream G600 business jet.

== Applications ==
- Cessna Citation Columbus (cancelled)
- Dassault Falcon 6X
- Gulfstream G400
- Gulfstream G500
- Gulfstream G600

== Specifications (PW810) ==
Data from FAA

==== General characteristics ====
- Type: Twin spool Turbofan
- Length: 105.8 in (269 cm) (flange to flange) / 130.44 in (331.3 cm) (fan spinner face to aft tail cone)
- Diameter: 50 in (130 cm) fan case
- Dry weight: 3,135.7 pounds (1,422.3 kg) (dry)

==== Components ====
- Compressor: 24-blade, single-piece Single-stage fan, 2-stage LP and 8-stage HP compressor
- Turbine: 2 stage HP and 5 stage LP turbine LP: max 6,240 rpm, HP: max 24,043 rpm

==== Performance ====
- Maximum thrust: PW814GA: 15,429 lbf (68.63 kN), PW815GA: 16,011 lbf (71.22 kN) (33°C flat rated)
- Bypass ratio: 5.5:1 (approx)
- Turbine inlet temperature: 965 °C / 1769 °F (ITT)
- Thrust-to-weight ratio: 4.92 - 5.11

== See also ==
Related development

- Pratt & Whitney PW1000G

Comparable engines

- Rolls-Royce Pearl
- Rolls-Royce RB282
- General Electric Passport
- Snecma Silvercrest
