= General Electric Passport =

High-bypass turbofan aircraft engine

Passport
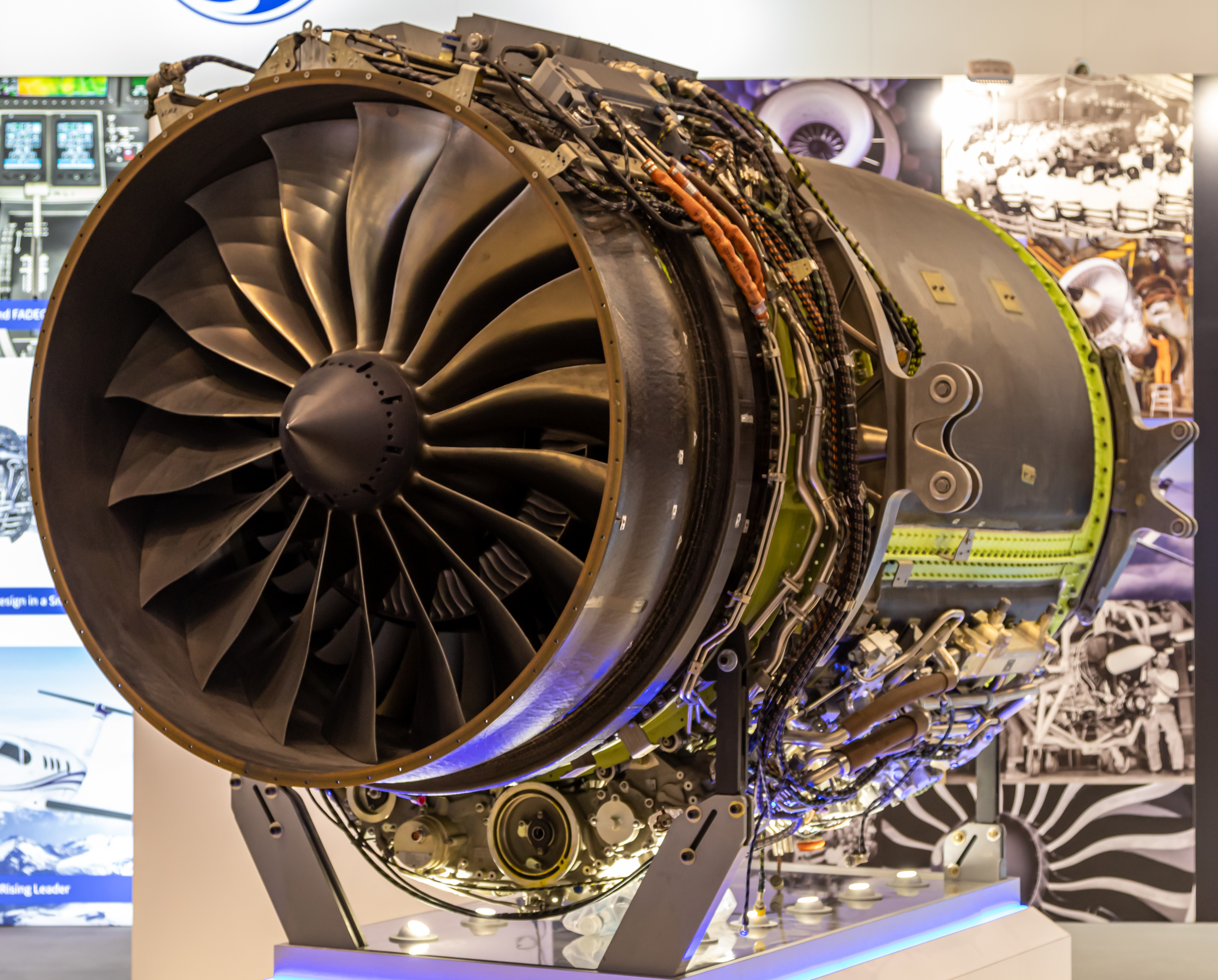
- Passport engine exhibited at the EBACE 2019
- Type: Turbofan
- National origin: United States
- Manufacturer: GE Aerospace
- First run: June 24, 2013
- Major applications: Bombardier Global 7500 and 8000
- Developed from: General Electric CF34; CFM International LEAP

The General Electric Passport is a turbofan developed by GE Aerospace for large business jets. It was selected in 2010 to power the Bombardier Global 7500 and 8000, first run on June 24, 2013, and first flown in 2015. It was certified in April 2016 and powered the Global 7500 first flight on November 4, 2016, before its 2018 introduction. It produces 14,000 to 20,000 lbf (60 to 90 kN) of thrust, a range previously covered by the General Electric CF34-10. A smaller scaled CFM LEAP, it is a twin-spool axial engine with a 5.6:1 bypass ratio, a 45:1 overall pressure ratio and one-piece 52 in (130 cm) titanium fan blisk with 18 blades.

== Development ==
The GE eCore research program, which developed a common architecture for business, narrowbody and regional jets, resulted in the CFM LEAP engine which replaced the CFM56 on the Boeing 737 MAX and Airbus A320neo. After a market study, GE pursued the long-range, large business jet requirement and selected a 14,000–20,000 lbf (62–89 kN) thrust range using technology it had developed for its commercial and military engine programs. Preliminary design work started in 2009. In 2010, Bombardier Aerospace selected the engine with a 16,500 lbf (73 kN) rating for the Global 7000 announced at the same year NBAA convention. Testing of the engine core began in 2010. On May 16, 2011, the TechX was renamed the Passport.

In 2011, rig testing started for components such as the combustor and high-pressure turbine. In 2012, a fan blade-off test was done to confirm whether the fan case could stop blade parts from passing through the case and causing further damage. By 2013, testing of engines had started at the GE outdoor testing site at Peebles, Ohio. In 2014 bird ingestion and endurance tests were done. In 2015, the Passport first flew installed on the GE Boeing 747-100 flying testbed based at Victorville, California. Icing and water ingestion tests up to simulated altitudes of 51,000 feet were done at the U.S. facility in Tennessee.

In April 2016, it was FAA Certified after 3,380 hours and 3,385 cycles of testing. The Global 7000 made its maiden flight with it on November 4, 2016. It flew 100 hours on the Boeing 747 before logging more than 900 hours aboard the Global 7000 prototypes. By May 2017, the engines had completed 3,100h in ground and flight test.

On 15 August 2017, the Global 7000 second prototype's right engine suffered an in-flight flameout at FL410, after “high vibration and high inter-turbine temperature readings”; subsequently, the airplane returned to Wichita Airport (290 km away) for a single engine landing. It was traced to a mis-assembled part and a fleet-wide inspection revealed it was a one-off error.

In autumn 2017, GE was building the flight test engines for Bombardier while preparing for early manufacturing. By service entry in 2018, 4,000 hours and 8,000 cycles of testing should be completed.

In 2021, General Electric tendered Passport to the USAF to be assessed in a contest against Rolls-Royce and Pratt & Whitney to reengine the B-52H Stratofortress. The contract was awarded to Rolls-Royce.

== Design ==
The GE Passport is a high bypass ratio turbofan

The engine is a twin-spool, axial-flow turbofan with a high bypass ratio of 5.6:1 and an overall pressure ratio of 45:1. The front fan is attached to the three-stage low-pressure compressor; the 23:1 pressure ratio 10-stage high-pressure compressor includes five blisk stages for weight reduction. The low-emission combustor has a case with integrated OGV diffuser for weight reduction. There is a two-stage high-pressure and four-stage low-pressure turbine. The engine and aircraft accessory drive extracts energy from the high-pressure, high-speed rotor. It is equipped with a dual-channel Full Authority Digital Engine Control (FADEC) control system, providing fault isolation and engine functionality and diagnostics capability.

A smaller scaled CFM LEAP, its HP compressor has five titanium blisks then five stages with insertable nickel alloy blades for higher temperatures. Its bleed air cooled turbine blades are made of advanced alloys from the eCore program. Blade tip active clearance control is modulated with cooling air from an enclosing manifold to the case, controlling its expansion and contraction depending on the flight envelope.

The 52 in (130 cm) fan blisk, the first application of such technology on an engine this size, eliminates the need to balance a hub and blade system. Blisk fans are usually found in small GE Honda HF120 or Williams International turbofans but the Passport titanium blisk is larger than the GE90 first stage compressor blisk. The 18 highly twisted wide chord forged titanium blades are friction welded by translations to the hub. The one piece fan reduces the vibration for cabin comfort, lowers wear and maintenance due to fewer parts, is lighter by a third and improves performance with less leaks and a smaller hub. Fuselage-mounted business jet engines are high off the ground and shielded by the wing from most foreign object damage. Its blades are more damage-resistant by being thicker at the leading edges due to their great efficiency. The fan can be changed on-wing as a LRU to be evaluated for repair in the shop.

Its core cowling, exhaust cone and mixer are made in ox-ox composites, with inorganic high-temperature-tolerant resins and oxide ceramics CMCs to withstand 1,000 °C without deformation, saving weight and allowing complex molding. The carbon fiber composite fan cowl can contain a separated fan blade. GE provides the whole nacelle including the thrust reverser. Developed with Safran, the slimline nacelle with clam-shell cowl openings reduce weight and drag.

Its TSFC is 8% lower than the competing BR725 of the Gulfstream 650, and over 10% better than the BR710. GE's Strother Field plant in Arkansas City, Kansas, was the initial final assembly location. GE's plant in Lafayette, Indiana, is the current assembly site for the engine as of 2020.

== Applications ==
- Bombardier Global 7500/8000

== Specifications (Passport 20) ==
Data from type certificate data sheet

==== General characteristics ====
- Type: High-bypass turbofan
- Length: 132.5 in (337 cm)
- Diameter: 52 in (130 cm)
- Dry weight: 4,554 lb (2,066 kg)

==== Components ====
- Compressor: Axial, 1 stage fan, 3 stage LP compressor, 23:1 pressure ratio 10 stage HP compressor
- Combustors: Low emission TAPS combustor
- Turbine: Axial, 2 stage high pressure turbine, 4 stage low pressure turbine
- Fuel type: Aviation/Low Freeze/High Flash/Low Flash Kerosene

==== Performance ====
- Maximum thrust: 17,745–18,920 lbf (78.93–84.16 kN)
- Overall pressure ratio: 45:1
- Bypass ratio: 5.6
- Turbine inlet temperature: Indicated Turbine exhaust gas temperature : Takeoff, 5 minutes at 1,895 °F (1,035 °C)
- Thrust-to-weight ratio: 3.9 - 4.2

== See also ==
- General Electric CF34

Related development

- CFM International LEAP

Comparable engines

- Pratt & Whitney Canada PW800
- Snecma Silvercrest
- Rolls-Royce BR700 BR725/Pearl

Related lists

- List of aircraft engines
