= Rolls-Royce RB282 =

2000s British turbofan aircraft engine

RB282
- Type: Turbofan
- Manufacturer: Rolls-Royce plc

The Rolls-Royce RB282 is a new series of twin-spool turbofan engines under development by Rolls-Royce.

The first variant of this engine was intended to power the future Dassault Falcon 5X super mid-sized business jet, the replacement for the Falcon 50 EX, entering service in 2012. The engine developed 10,000 pounds of thrust. In October 2013, Dassault chose to power the Falcon 5X with the Safran Silvercrest instead.
