= Side-stick =

Aircraft control

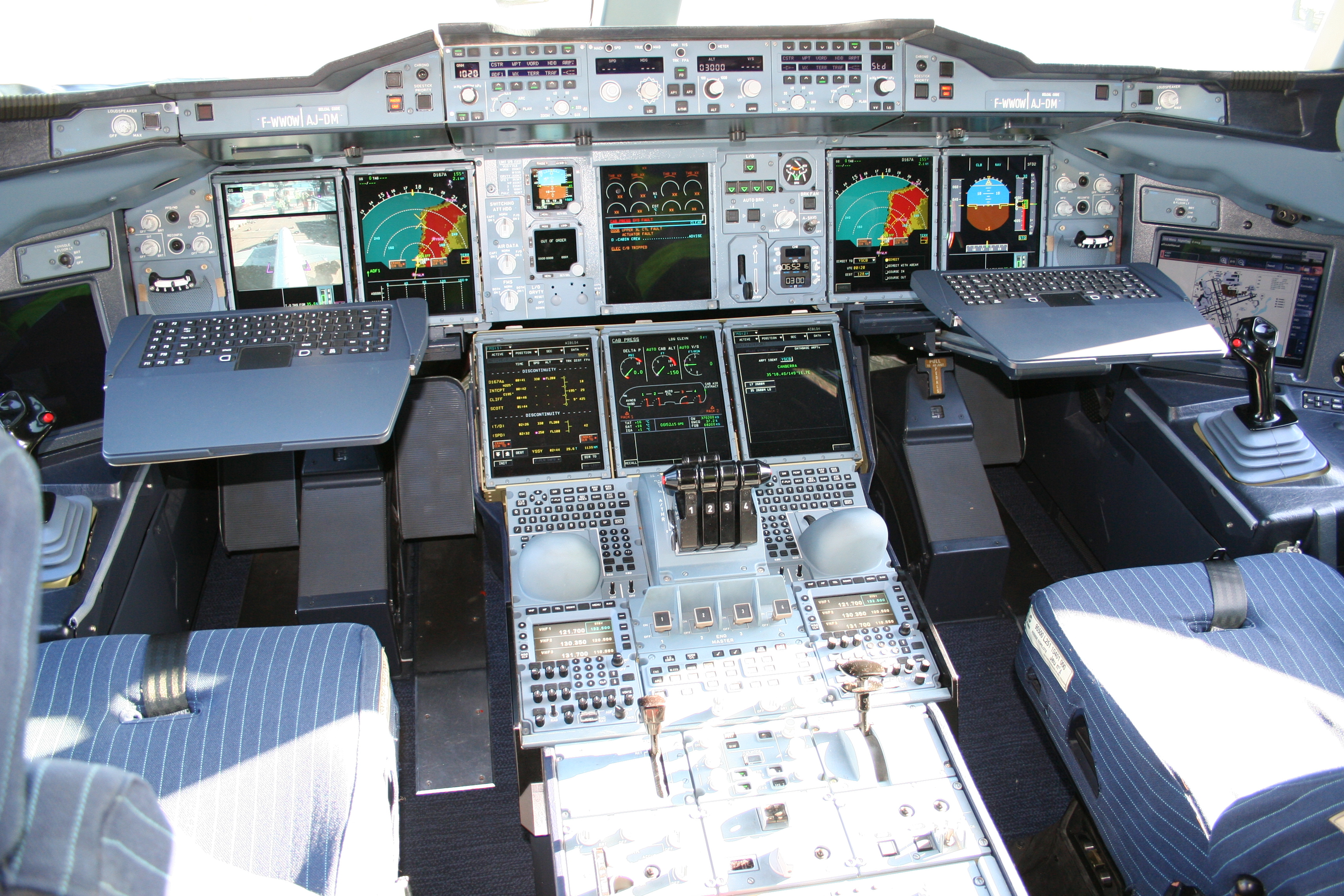
Airbus A380 flight deck with black side-sticks on the left side of the left seat and on the right side of the right seat. The throttle controls in the central console are black, labeled 1–4.

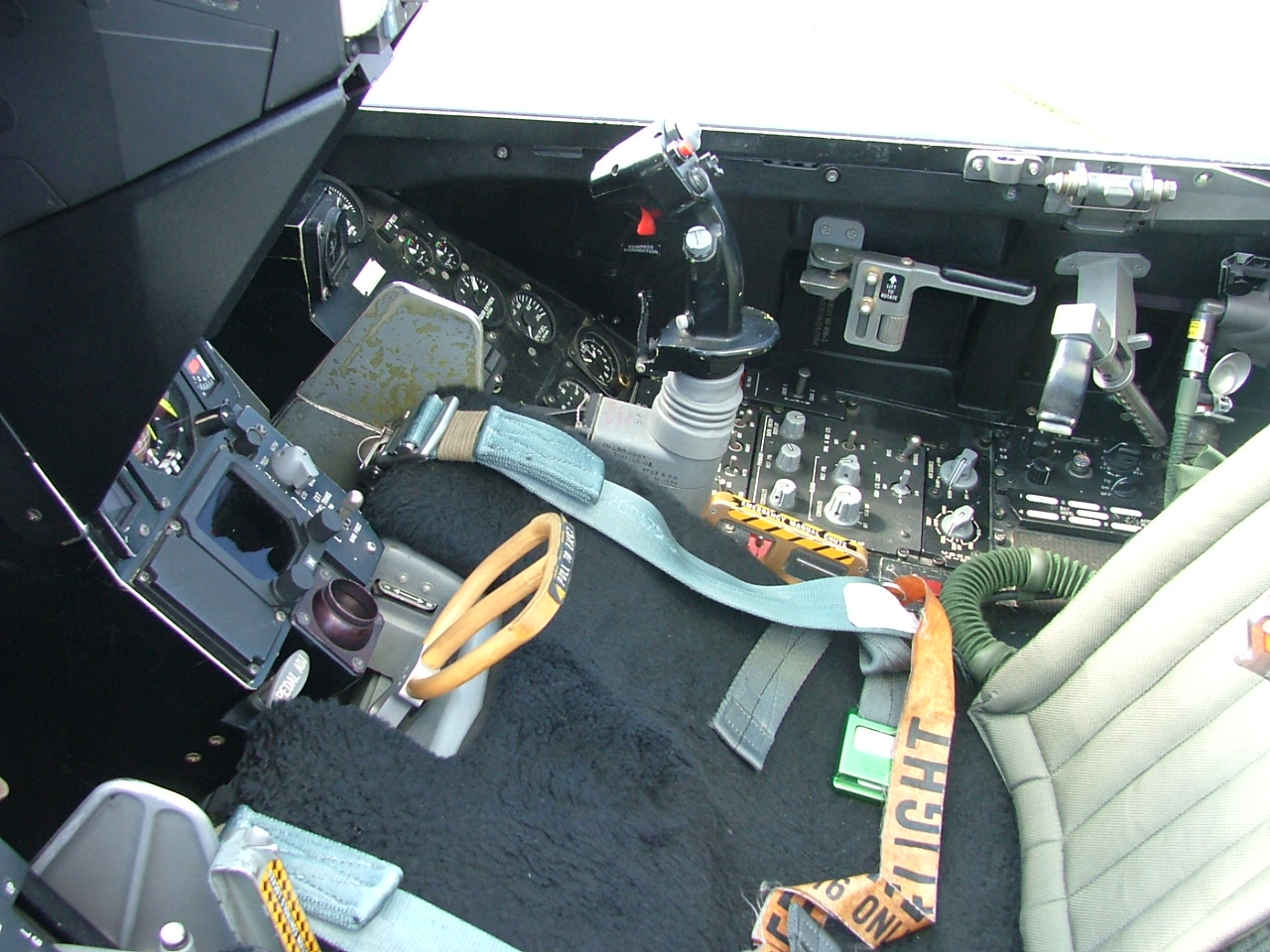
F-16 cockpit showing side-stick

A side-stick or sidestick controller is an aircraft control stick that is located on the side console of the pilot, usually on the righthand side, or outboard on a two-seat flightdeck. Typically this is found in aircraft that are equipped with fly-by-wire control systems.

The throttle controls are typically located to the left of a single pilot or centrally on a two-seat flightdeck. Only one hand is required to operate them; two-handed operation is neither possible nor necessary.

== History ==
The use of side sticks became possible by the mid 1970s with the development of fly-by-wire technology.

== Prevalence ==
The side-stick is used in many modern aircraft, such as the:

- Fighter aircraft:
  - F-16 Fighting Falcon (1974)
  - Dassault Rafale (1986)
  - AIDC F-CK 1 Ching-Kuo (1989)
  - Mitsubishi F-2 (1995)
  - F-22 Raptor (1996)
  - F-35 Lightning 2 (2006)
  - Chengdu J-20 (2009)
  - Shenyang FC-31 (2012)
  - KAI KF-21 Boramae (2022)
- Jet trainers and light attack
  - KAI T-50 Golden Eagle (2001)
  - Boeing–Saab T-7 Red Hawk (2016)
  - TAI Hürjet (2023)
- Civil aircraft
  - Airbus A320 (1984) and all subsequent Airbus aircraft, including the largest passenger jet in service, the Airbus A380
  - Sukhoi Superjet 100 (2007)
  - Gulfstream G400/G500/G600 (2014)
- Helicopters
  - Bell 525.

== Compared to centre sticks ==
A side-stick arrangement contrasts with the more conventional design where the stick is located in the centre of the cockpit between the pilot's legs, called a "centre stick". A side-stick arrangement increases ejection seat safety for the pilot as there is less interference among flight controls.

== Handling of dual input situations ==
In Airbus's implementation, input values of both side-sticks are normally added up, except when the "priority takeover button" is held down, causing any inputs on the other side-stick to be ignored. Holding this button down for a minimum of 40 seconds will disable the other side-stick, which can be reversed by pressing the button on either side-stick again. If one stick is disabled a red light will show on it, and a green light on the active one.

While the inputs are added up, the sum is clamped to the value of the maximum possible deflection a single side-stick; but this still means that when both side-sticks are deflected 50% in the same direction, the resulting effective input will be that of a fully deflected side-stick. Also, because the inputs are added, any deflection of the other side-stick in the opposite direction will in effect be subtracted, resulting in the inputs partially cancelling each other out. For example, if two inputs have opposite directions but equal magnitudes, the sum will be zero, and the flight control surfaces will not move.

In addition to visual indications, detection of more than a single side-stick deflection greater than 2° from neutral without the priority takeover button being held down results in an aural "DUAL INPUT" warning repeated every five seconds. This aural warning has the lowest priority, and is overridden by a warning of higher priority, such as from the EGPWS, posing a potential risk. Examples of this occurring include the 2009 crash of Air France Flight 447 (an Airbus A330 flying from Rio de Janeiro to Paris), the 2010 crash of Afriqiyah Airways Flight 771 an Airbus A330 from flying Johannesburg to Tripoli and the 2014 crash of Indonesia AirAsia Flight 8501 (an Airbus A320 flying from Surabaya to Singapore)..

== Comparison of passive and active side-sticks ==
=== Passive side-sticks ===
In the centre stick design, like traditional airplane yokes, both the pilot flying, PF's, and pilot not flying, PNF's, controls are mechanically connected together so each pilot has a sense of the control inputs of the other.

In aircraft with passive side-sticks, on the other hand, they move independently from each other, and do not offer any haptic feedback on what the other pilot is inputting. This can lead to "dual input" situations, which should be avoided.

=== Active side-sticks ===
However a later, significant, development is the "active" side-stick. The concept was being researched as early as 1990, and was eventually used in the Gulfstream G500/G600 series business jet aircraft. In this system, movements in one side-stick produce the same actions in the other side-stick and therefore provide valuable feedback to the other pilot. This addresses the earlier criticisms of the "passive" side-stick. The active side-stick also provides tactile feedback to the pilot during manual flight. In 2015, the three largest avionics manufacturers – Honeywell, Rockwell Collins and Thales – were predicting this would become the standard for all new fly-by-wire aircraft. In 2015, Ratier-Figeac, a subsidiary of UTC Aerospace Systems and supplier of passive side-sticks to Airbus since the 1980s, became the supplier of active side-sticks for the Irkut MC-21. This is the first airliner to use them.

Such an active side-stick can also be used to increase adherence to a safe flight envelope by applying force feedback when the pilot makes a control input that would bring the aircraft closer to (or beyond) the borders of the safe flight envelope. This reduces the risk of pilots entering dangerous states of flight outside the operational borders while maintaining the pilots' final authority and increasing their situational awareness.

== See also ==
- Centre stick
- Yoke (aeronautics)
- Fly-by-wire
- Dual control (aviation)
- Rudder pedals

=== Accidents ===
- Air France Flight 447
- Afriqiyah Airways Flight 771
- Armavia Flight 967
- Indonesia AirAsia Flight 8501
