= Dassault Falcon 6X =

French business jet

Falcon 6X
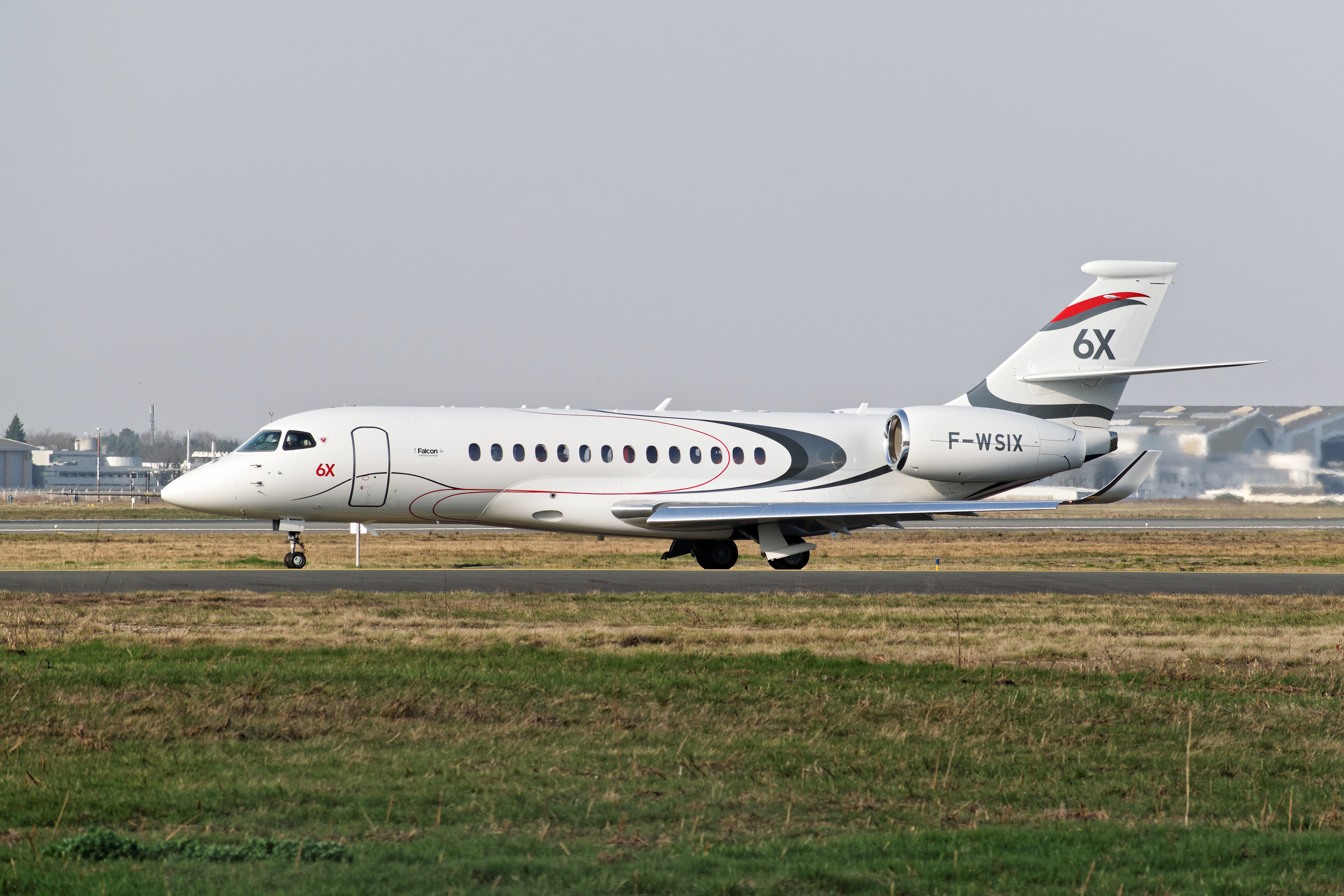
- Falcon 6X at Bordeaux-Mérignac Airport in March 2021

General information
- Type: Business jet
- National origin: France
- Manufacturer: Dassault Aviation

History
- Introduction date: 30 November 2023
- First flight: 10 March 2021

The Dassault Falcon 6X is a large, long-range business jet developed by Dassault Aviation in France. Its precursor, the Falcon 5X twinjet, was launched in 2013, rolled-out in 2015 and made its first flight on July 5, 2017, but its development was frozen as its Safran Silvercrest engine failed to meet performance objectives.

In December 2017, the Falcon 6X was launched as a stretched version with PW812D turbofans, made its first flight on 10 March 2021, and entered service on 30 November 2023.

It has the widest purpose-built business jet cabin at 2.58 m (102 in). Its 70.7 m^{2} (761 ft^{2}) wing allows a 35,135 kg (77,459 lb) maximum weight with 59.9 kN (13,460 lbf) engines, for a 5,500 nmi (10,200 km) range and a Mach 0.90 top speed.

== Development ==
=== Falcon 5X ===
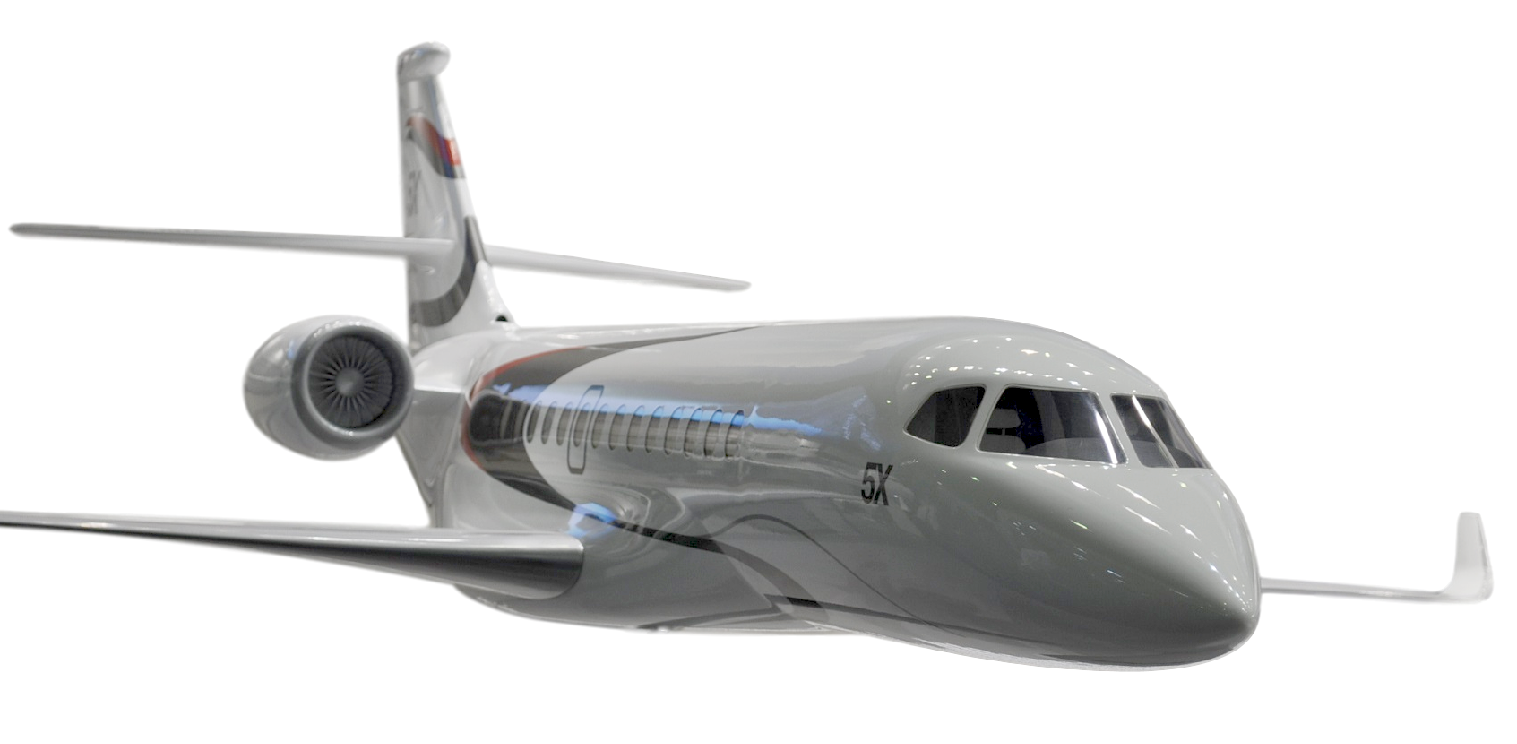
Dassault Falcon 5X Model at the 2015 Paris Air Show

Design work began in 2006 under the codename SMS for super-midsize, and was envisioned to compete with the Hawker 4000, the Bombardier Challenger 300 and the Gulfstream G200 or the Embraer Legacy 600 with a 3,400 nmi (6,297 km) range. Few details were publicized, except that the model was to be powered by two 44 kN (10,000 lb_{f}) Rolls-Royce RB282 engines.

The project was revamped after the Great Recession when demand for super midsized and smaller aircraft decreased dramatically, while demand for the large-cabin, long-range models remained vigorous. In 2009, the design was re-evaluated and the engine choice was reassessed.

Falcon 5X roll-out on 2 June 2015

The 5X was unveiled at the National Business Aviation Association's annual convention on 21 October 2013, to be powered by two Snecma Silvercrests. Compliant Silvercrest engines were originally planned for the end of 2013 but technical issues led Safran to postpone them to the end of 2017, leading to delay the 5X introduction from 2017 to 2020, and the high pressure compressor issues in the fall of 2017 delayed it further with performance shortfalls, preventing a 2020 service entry.

On 29 January 2016, Dassault Aviation confirmed a two-year delay and production freeze on the Falcon 5X because of ongoing problems with the Snecma Silvercrest engine, the same engine responsible for delaying the development of the Citation Hemisphere. As Dassault endured a near three-year delay to 2020 with 12 cancellations in 2016, it demanded compensation from Safran for the engine delays.

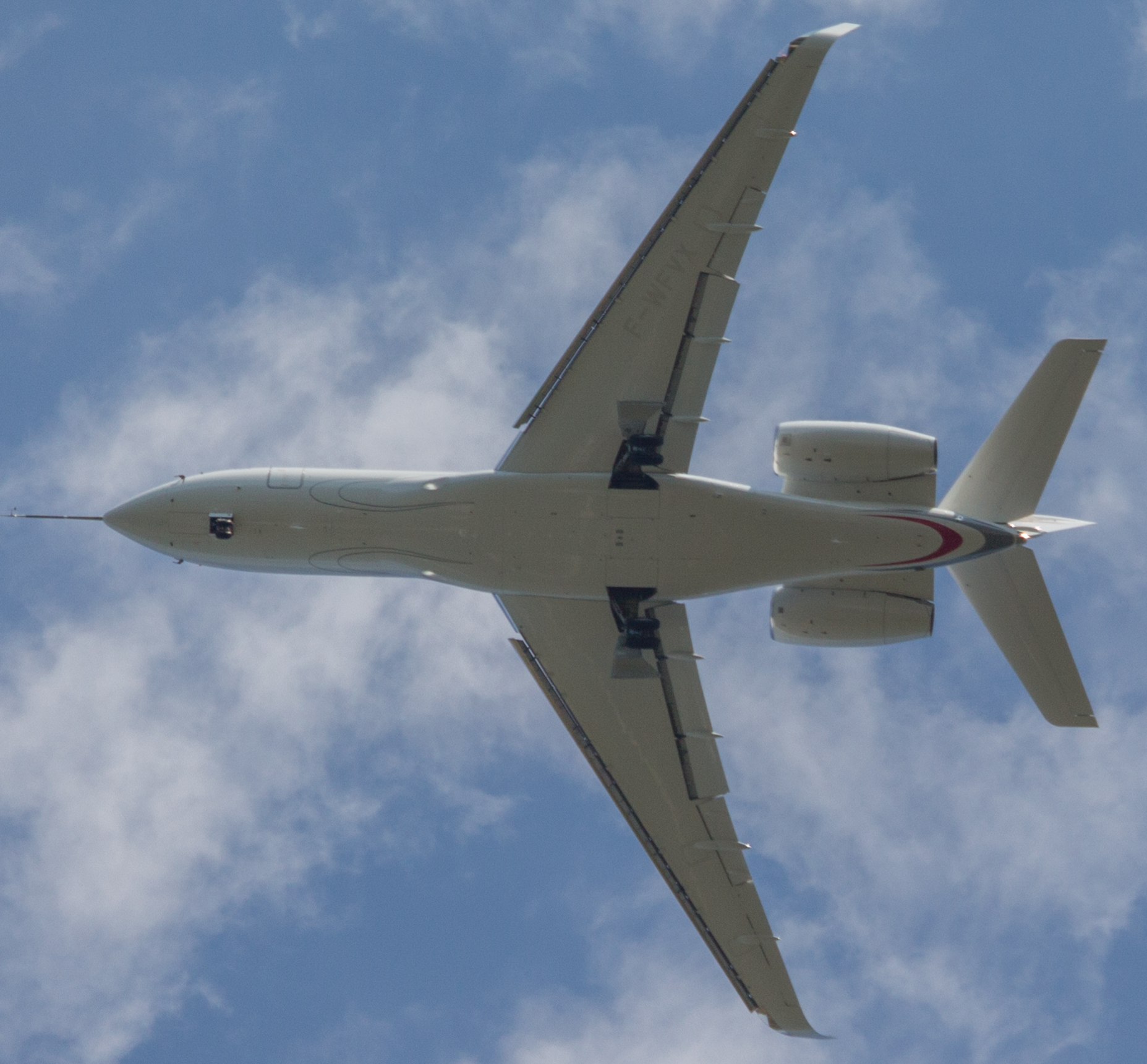
Planform view on Dassault Falcon 5X maiden flight

After ground tests in spring 2017 including low and high speed taxi, the 5X made its first flight from Bordeaux-Mérignac Airport with a preliminary version of the engines on 5 July 2017. The preliminary flight tests were intended to streamline the development program, leading to full flight testing in 2018. That program was planned to fly with certifiable engines for flight validation and type certification, "limiting the consequences of the four year engine development delay as much as possible". It was then scheduled to enter service in 2020.

By October 2017, the prototype had completed 50 flight hours, testing system performance and basic handling qualities. Dassault then announced the aircraft's service introduction could be further delayed after Safran discovered high-pressure compressor response problems at high altitudes and low airspeeds on its flying testbed in San Antonio. Dassault did not rule out switching its engine supplier at that point. The prototype reached Mach 0.8 and 41,000 ft.

=== Falcon 6X ===
On 13 December 2017, Dassault abandoned the Silvercrest due to technical and schedule risks, ending the 5X development. In its place the company launched a new Falcon model with the same fuselage cross section, Pratt & Whitney Canada engines and a 5,500 nmi (6,300 mi; 10,200 km) range, planned for a 2022 introduction. The new jet used Pratt & Whitney Canada PW800s, already powering the Gulfstream G500/G600.

The design was unveiled in February 2018, was forecast to make its first flight in early 2021 and begin deliveries in 2022. Dassault hoped to launch a larger and longer-range variant of the 6X, to compete with the 7,700 nm (14,300 km)-range Bombardier Global 7500 and the 7,500 nm-range Gulfstream G650ER. On 6 September 2018, Dassault Aviation and Safran ended their dispute with US$ 280 million in compensatory damages paid by Safran to Dassault. By October 2018, Dassault had started construction of the lower wing and rear fuselage parts.

By February 2019, the 6X's PW812D engines had accumulated 120 hours of flight tests. By May 2019, the design was frozen, the engines had 1,000 h of test time, and assembly was expected in 2020 for an on-track program. By October 2019, the first aircraft's front, main and rear fuselage sections were completed before being assembled and joined with the wing in early 2020.

The Falcon 6X was rolled out on 8 December 2020. The initial flight was on 10 March 2021. On 30 November 2021, a type certificate was issued by Transport Canada for the PW812 engine. It came after more than 4,900 hours of testing and will allow the 6X to enter service on schedule in late 2022.

By March 2022, Dassault had completed cold weather testing in Iqaluit, Canada, reaching -37 °C (-35 °F), towards certification expected later in 2022 as the test fleet had accumulated 650 flight hours across 220 sorties. By May 2022, as the three test aircraft have logged 850 hours, service entry was pushed to mid-2023 due to the supply chain crisis following the COVID-19 pandemic and the Russian invasion of Ukraine. In 2023, its equipped price was $54 million.

The 6X received both its Federal Aviation Administration and European Union Aviation Safety Agency type certificates in August 2023. The 6X entered service on 30 November 2023.

The first Part 91 Dassault Falcon 6X in the United States was delivered in late 2024.

== Design ==
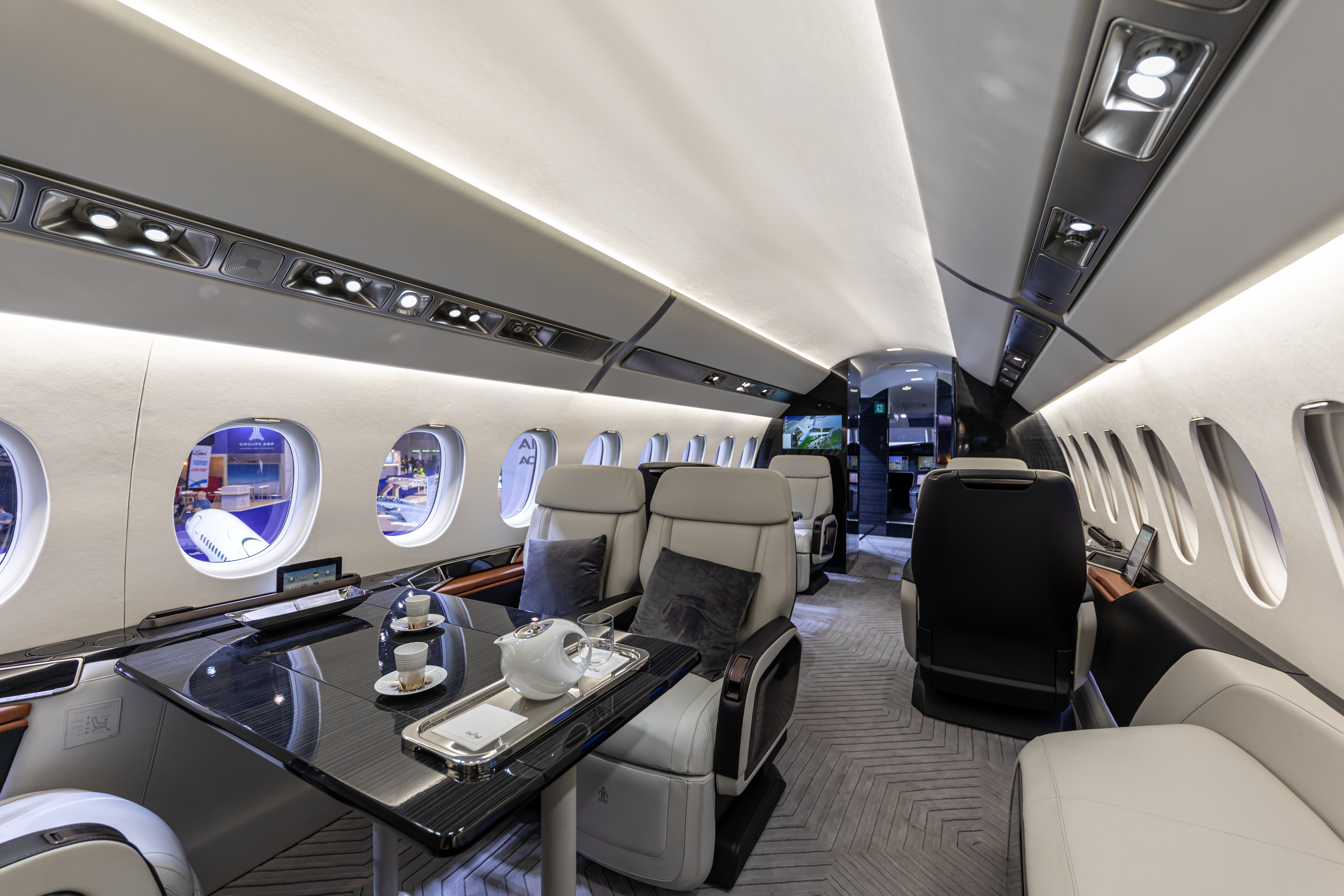
Falcon 6X cabin mock-up

The Falcon 6X is largely based on the Falcon 5X aerodynamics and systems, validated during its preliminary flight test program, but it is optimized to take advantage of its 58–62 kN (13,000–14,000 lbf) PW812D engines for a longer cabin and a greater 5,500 nmi (10,200 km) range, a Mach 0.90 top speed and a Mach 0.85 cruise. Its cabin is 12.3 m (40 ft) long, is 1.98 m (78 in) high by 2.58 m (102 in) wide (the largest in a purpose-built business jet), and can accommodate 16 passengers in three zones with 29 windows, including a galley skylight.

A front-fuselage extension makes its cabin 51 cm (20 in) longer. The Falcon 6X reinforces the 5X new 70.7 m^{2} (761 ft^{2}) wing and keeps its digital flight control system and Honeywell Primus Epic EASy III flight deck The new engine fans have a diameter of 110 cm (44 in), 15 cm (6 in) narrower than the Gulfstreams, with four low-pressure turbine stages instead of five, engine weight is reduced by 91 kg (200 lb). Its empty weight increases by 1,030 kg (2,270 lb) or 5.7%, from 18.1 to 19.2 t (40,000 to 42,300 lb), due to heavier engines, fuel system and structural reinforcements. The Falcon 6X will be the first Dassault aircraft with a nitrogen inerting system.

== Operators ==
=== Military ===
Ireland

- Irish Air Corps: One delivered 2025

Serbia
Government of Serbia: One delivered in 2025

== Specifications ==
Model	Falcon 5X	Falcon 6X
Crew	2	
Passengers	16	
Length	25.2 m (83 ft)	25.68 m (84.3 ft)
Height	7.5 m (25 ft)	7.47 m (24.5 ft)
Wingspan	25.9 m (85 ft)	25.94 m (85.1 ft)
Wing area	72.4 m^{2} (779 sq ft)	70.7 m^{2} (761 sq ft)
Wing aspect ratio	9.27	9.52
Max Takeoff Weight	31,570 kg (69,600 lb)	35,135 kg (77,459 lb)
Empty Weight	18,144 kg (40,000 lb)	19,170 kg (42,270 lb)
Fuel Capacity		15,325 kg (33,786 lb)
Turbofan	2 × Snecma Silvercrest	2 × P&WC PW812D
Thrust	2 × 50.9 kN (11,450 lbf)	2 × 59.9 kN (13,460 lbf) (Note: ISA+20°C Flat rated)
Max Speed	Mach 0.9 (594 mph; 516 kn; 956 km/h)	
LR cruise		Mach 0.8 (528 mph; 459 kn; 850 km/h)
Ceiling	51,000 ft (15,545 m)	
Range	5,200 nmi (6,000 mi; 9,600 km) (Note: 8 passengers + 3 crew, NBAA IFR reserves, ISA, full fuel, Mach 0.8)	5,500 nmi (6,300 mi; 10,200 km)
Balanced Takeoff		1,670 m (5,480 ft) (Note: (MTOW, SL, ISA))
Landing		760 m (2,490 ft) (Note: FAR 91, typical landing weight)

== See also ==
Aircraft of comparable role, configuration, and era

- Bombardier Global 6000
- Gulfstream G500/G600

Related lists

- List of civil aircraft
