= Cessna Citation Columbus =

Cancelled American business jet project

General information
- Type: Business jet
- National origin: United States
- Manufacturer: Cessna
- Status: Development canceled 10 July 2009

The Cessna Citation Columbus was a business jet project by Cessna, part of the Cessna Citation family. The Model 850 was launched in February 2008 and cancelled in July 2009. It would have been the largest model of the family at the time. Powered by 8,830 lbf (39.3 kN) PW810 turbofans and a 4,000 nmi (4,600 mi; 7,400 km) range, the $27 million aircraft had a 709 sq ft (66 m^{2}), 30° swept wing.

== Development ==
Cessna began research on the largest Citation in 2002 with market studies, surveys, concept testing, focus groups and customer advisory boards. A mockup of the large cabin concept was unveiled on October 17, 2006, at the National Business Aviation Association convention

Cessna formally announced the aircraft on February 6, 2008; FAA certification was planned by the end of 2013, with deliveries beginning in 2014. The Columbus had a target range of 4,000 nmi (4,603 mi; 7,408 km) with 8 passengers. The cockpit would have featured a synthetic vision system, autothrottles, optional head-up display and Collins' MultiScan weather radar with optional windshear prediction.

Cessna was going to invest $780 million into the development including a new plant, major suppliers were Pratt & Whitney Canada for the engines; Rockwell Collins for the avionics; Vought Aircraft Industries for the wing; Spirit AeroSystems for the fuselage and Spirit AeroSystems Europe Ltd. for the empennage; Parker Hannifin for the powered flight control system; Goodrich Corporation for the landing gear.

On April 29, 2009 Cessna announced that it was suspending the Citation Columbus program, but indicated at that time that the program might be restarted once economic conditions improved. The company also indicated that it would lay off 1,600 workers, including up to 700 workers from the Columbus program.

On July 8, 2009, Cessna reported the cancellation of the program in documents filed with the Securities and Exchange Commission (SEC). The company said "Upon additional analysis of the business jet market related to this product offering, we decided to formally cancel further development of the Citation Columbus". Cessna's parent company, Textron will write-off US$43 million as a results of the cancellation. The SEC-filed documents indicate that Cessna spent approximately US$50 million on tooling, facilities and other costs for the project. Most of these costs are unrecoverable and cannot be used for other projects.

Pratt & Whitney Canada immediately stopped the PW810 engine program, but continued the PW800 series. On July 11, 2009, Cessna announced that it would return US$10M to the City of Wichita and Sedgwick County. The money was received as an economic incentive for developing the aircraft in Wichita and was part of $70M in cash assistance and tax breaks received from those two governments.

== Specifications ==
Data from Flight International 2008

General characteristics

- Capacity: 10 passengers
- Length: 77 ft (23 m)
- Wingspan: 80 ft (24 m)
- Height: 27 ft 7 in (8.41 m)
- Wing area: 709.3 sq ft (65.90 m^{2})
- Powerplant: 2 × Pratt & Whitney Canada PW810 turbofans, 8,830 lbf (39.3 kN) thrust each

Performance

- Maximum speed: Mach 0.85
- Cruise speed: 488 kn (562 mph, 904 km/h) Mach 0.85
- Range: 4,000 nmi (4,600 mi, 7,400 km) Mach 0.8, 8 passengers
- Service ceiling: 45,000 ft (14,000 m)
- Time to altitude: 27 min to 41,000 ft (12,000 m)

== See also ==
Related development

- Cessna Citation series
- Cessna Citation Hemisphere (comparable range)

Aircraft of comparable role, configuration, and era

- Bombardier Challenger 605
- Dassault Falcon 2000EX
- Gulfstream IV G350
