= Safran Silvercrest =

French turbofan aircraft engine

Silvercrest
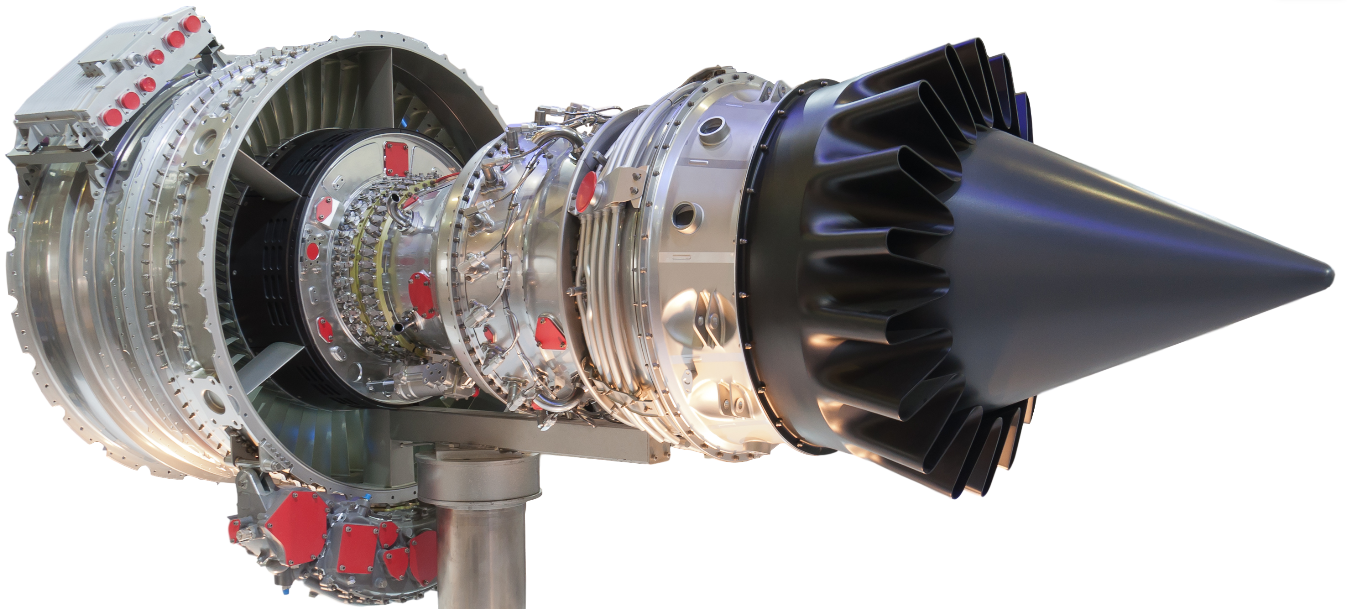
- The engine on display at the Paris Air Show 2013
- Type: Turbofan
- National origin: France
- Manufacturer: Safran
- First run: September 2012
- Major applications: Cessna Citation Hemisphere
- Status: Development is practically ceased
- Number built: 7

The Safran Silvercrest was a French turbofan unsuccessful development intended to power the Dassault Falcon 5X and Cessna Citation Hemisphere. A project of Safran Aircraft Engines, it did not meet the requirements for either aircraft program and was cancelled while still in the development stage.

== Development ==
The Silvercrest was announced at the 2006 National Business Aviation Association convention.

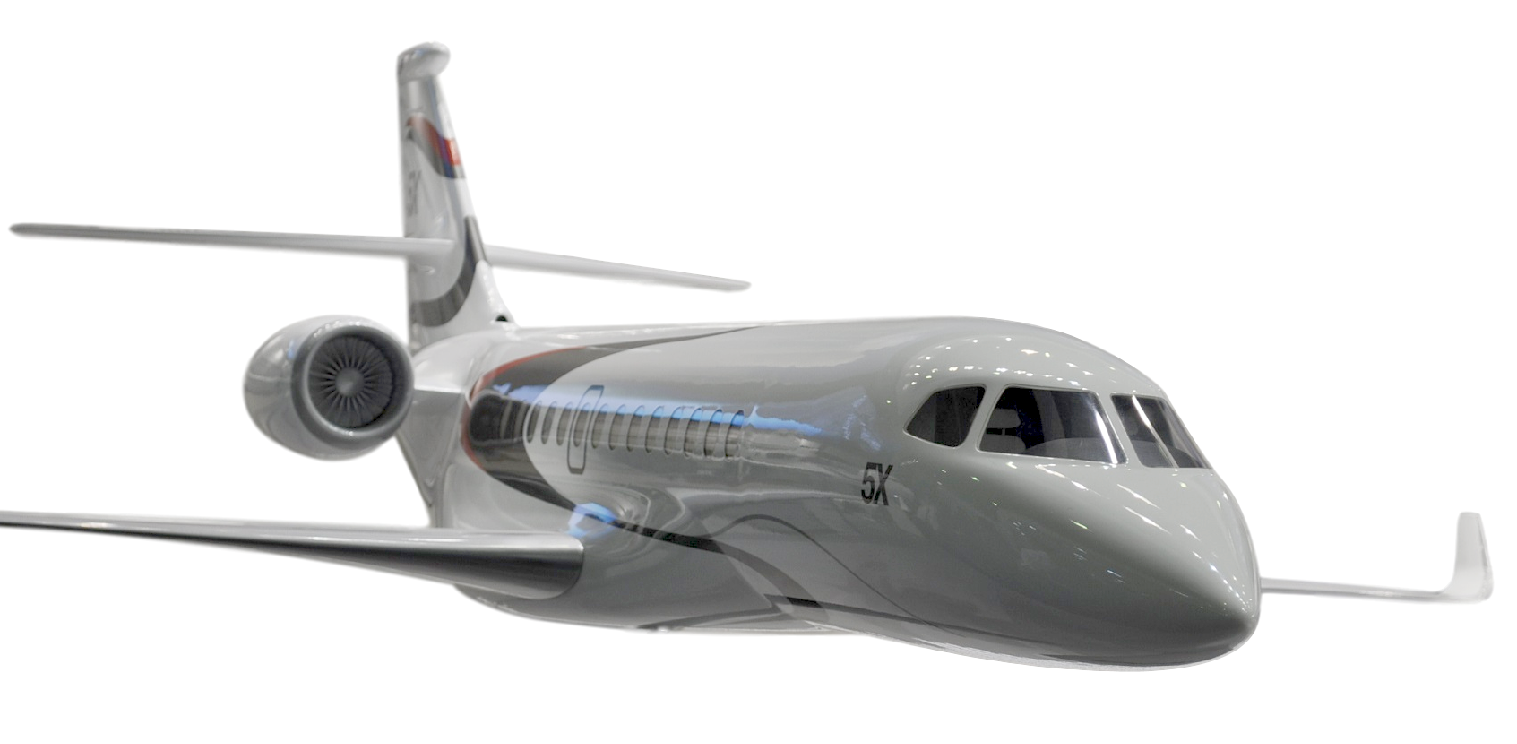
Falcon 5X Dassault Falcon model at the 2015 Paris Air Show

The first engine went to test in September 2012. Flight testing started in July 2014 on a Grumman Gulfstream II at [Lackland Air Base, San Antonio, Texas]. Later, in 2017 moved to Istres-Le Tubé Air Base. Problem areas disclosed at the time included high-pressure compressor operability, oil-fuel heat exchanger performance, carcass distortion and turbine tip clearance control.

In December 2017, Dassault abandoned the Silvercrest due to technical and schedule risks. It terminated the 5X program and launched a new Falcon with the same cross section, Pratt & Whitney Canada engines and a 5,500 nmi (6,300 mi; 10,200 km) range for a 2022 introduction.

In July 2019, Textron suspended the Cessna Citation Hemisphere development due to engine shortcomings.

== Design ==
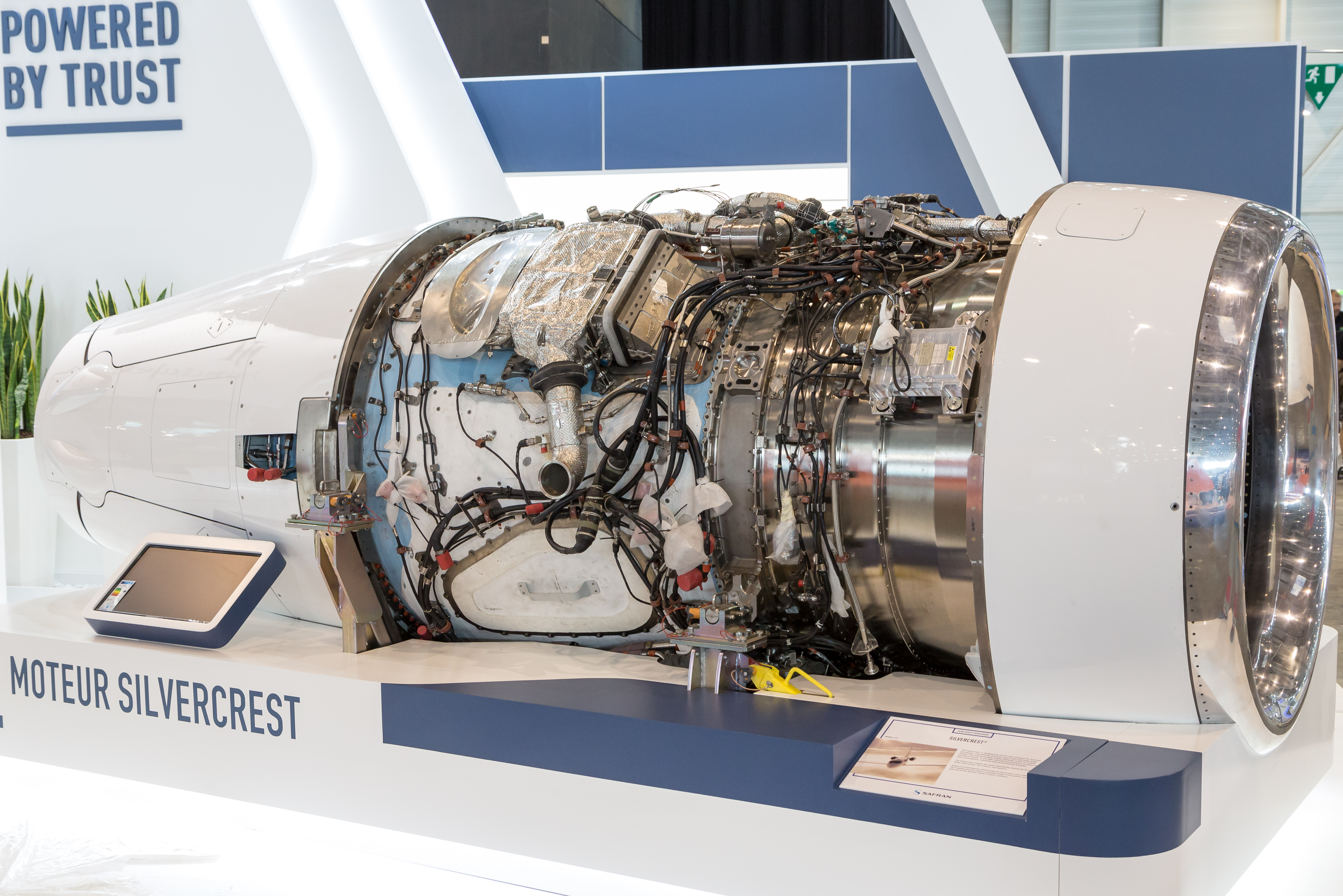
A Silvercrest with inlet and thrust reverser presented at the EBACE in 2018

It was originally designed as an 8,500–10,500 lbf (38–47 kN) thrust turbofan. It was meant for large-cabin business jets and 40 to 60-seat regional jets with a maximum takeoff weight of 45,000 to 60,000 lb (20,000 to 27,000 kg). In 2016 the thrust range was quoted as 10,000–12,000 lbf (44–53 kN).

The two-shaft engine included a 42.5 in (108 cm) fan with solid wide-chord swept blades, followed by 4 booster stages, all driven by a 4-stage low pressure turbine. The high pressure spool had 4 axial compressor stages and 1 centrifugal stage, driven by a single-stage turbine. An axi-centrifugal compressor was unusual for an engine with more than 10,000 lb thrust.

A related design in 2007 used a smaller 40-inch fan with a lower 4.5 bypass ratio, no booster, an extra high-pressure compressor stage, one less low-pressure turbine stage, a 27:1 overall pressure ratio and a core pressure ratio of "over 17".

== Applications ==
Silvercrest 2C
Cessna Citation Hemisphere development aircraft only, first flight 2019.

Silvercrest SC-2D
Dassault Falcon 5X development aircraft only; thrust 11,450 lbf (50.9 kN). Both aircraft and engine were simultaneously unveiled at the National Business Aviation Association annual convention on October 21, 2013, with entry into service in 2020. Dassault announced the cancellation of the 5X program on 13 December 2017.

== Specifications (2D) ==
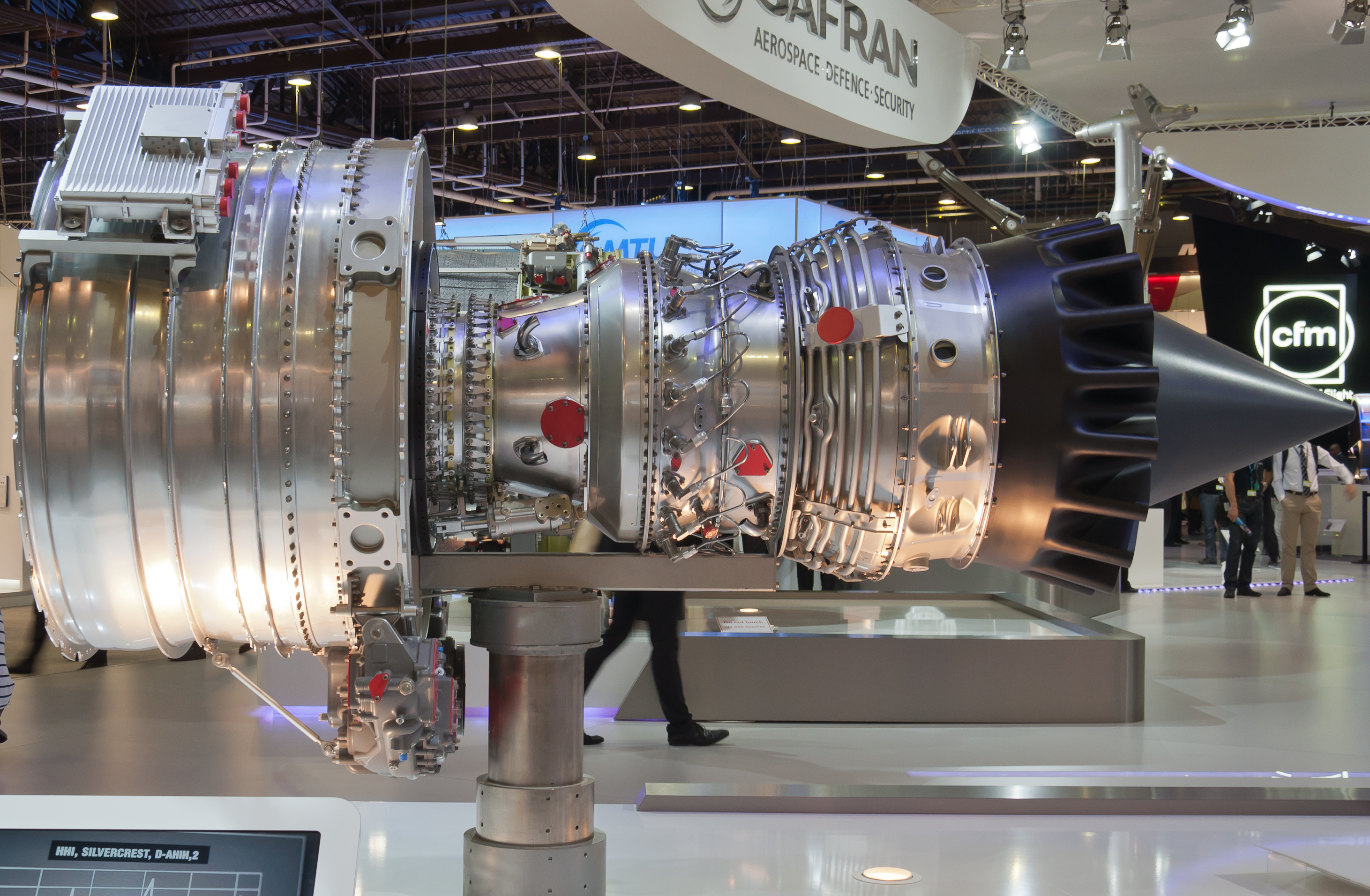
A Silvercrest bare engine.

Data from Snecma.

==== General characteristics ====
- Type: axial and centrifugal flow, twin-shaft, bypass turbofan engine
- Length: approx. 74 inches (190 cm)
- Diameter: 42.5 inches (108 cm) Fan
- Dry weight: 2,290 lb (1,040 kg)

==== Components ====
- Compressor: 4 low-pressure stages, 4 high-pressure blisks + 1 centrifugal stage
- Turbine: 1 high-pressure, 4 low-pressure stages

==== Performance ====
- Maximum thrust: 11,450 lbf (50.9 kN)
- Overall pressure ratio: 38.5
- Bypass ratio: 5.9:1
- Thrust-to-weight ratio: 5

== See also ==
Comparable engines

- General Electric Passport
- Pratt & Whitney Canada PW800

Related lists

- List of aircraft engines
