= Centre stick =

Aircraft cockpit control

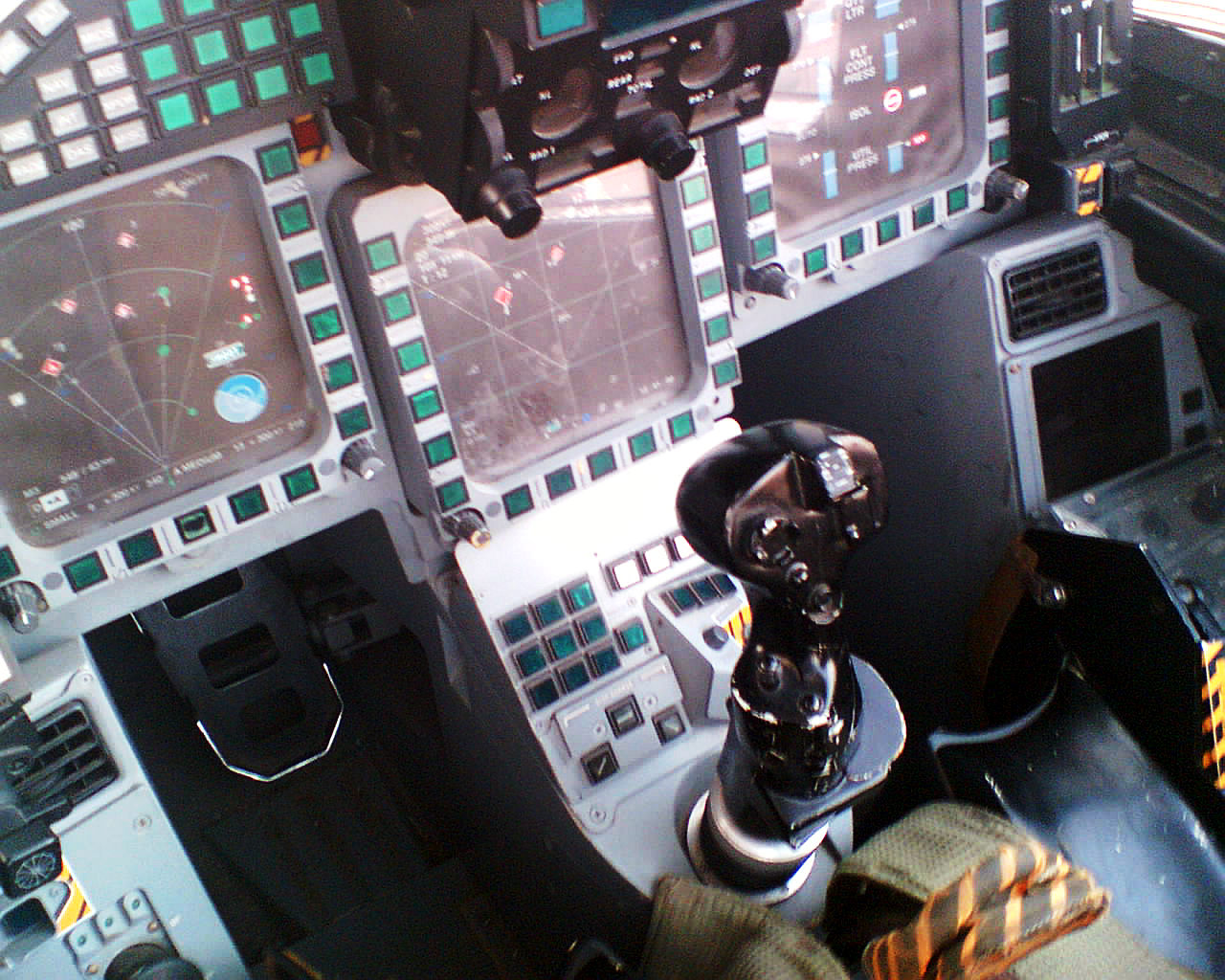
A fly-by-wire centre stick in a preproduction Eurofighter Typhoon cockpit

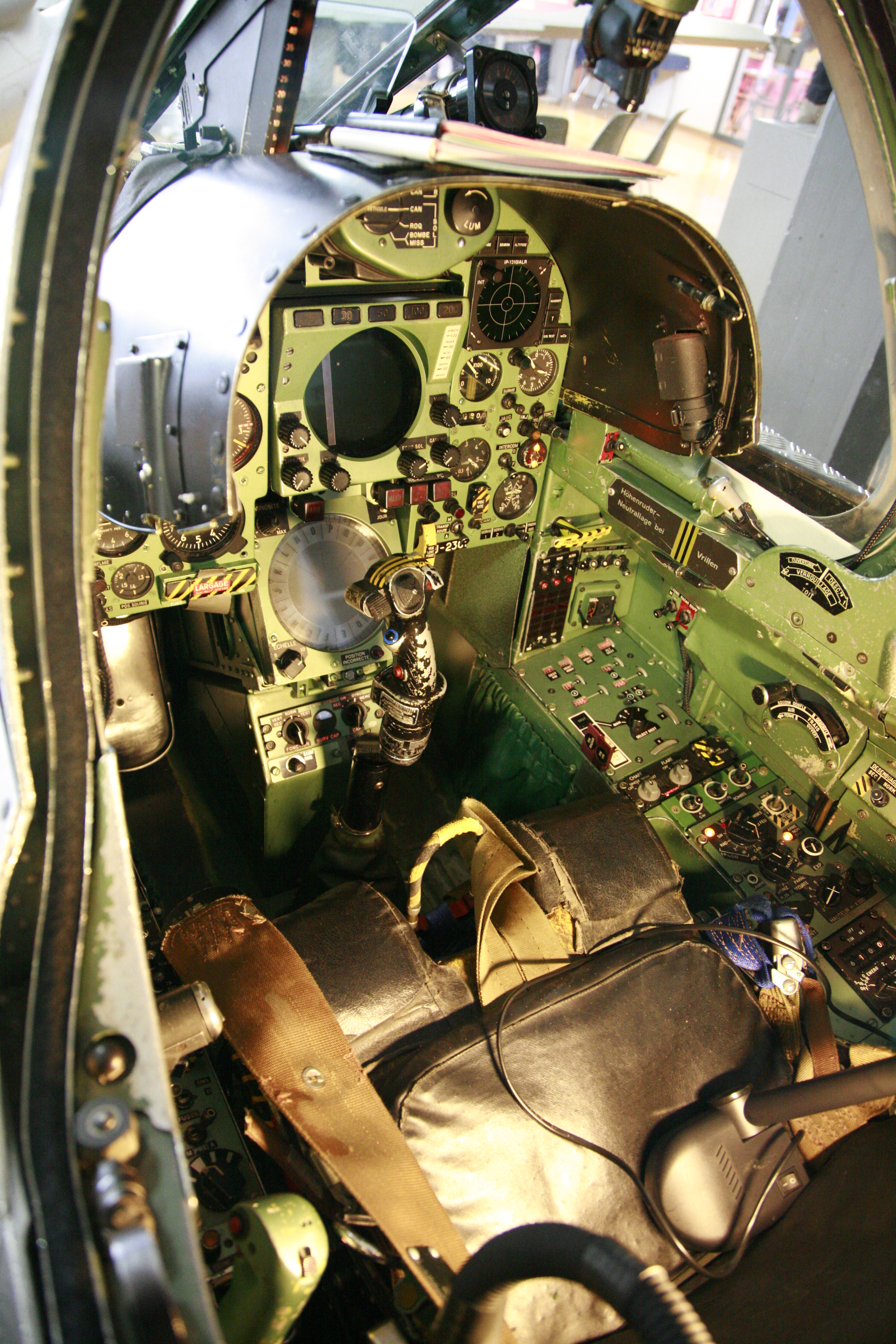
Central forward area of the Mirage III cockpit, showing a centre stick

A centre stick (spelled center stick in American English), or simply control stick, is an aircraft cockpit arrangement where the control column (or joystick) is located in the center of the cockpit either between the pilot's legs or between the pilots' positions. Since the throttle controls are typically located to the left of the pilot, the right hand is used for the stick, although left-hand or both-hands operation is possible if required.

The centre stick is a part of an aircraft's flight control system and is typically linked to its ailerons and elevators, or alternatively to its elevons, by control rods or control cables on basic aircraft. On heavier, faster, more advanced aircraft the centre stick may also control power-assist modules. Modern aircraft centre sticks are also usually equipped with a number of electrical control switches within easy finger reach, in order to reduce the pilot's workload.

== History ==
The centre stick originated at the turn of the twentieth century. In 1900, Wilhelm Kress of Austria developed a control stick for aircraft, but did not apply for a patent. Instead, a patent was awarded to the French aviator, Robert Esnault-Pelterie who applied for it in 1907.

== Split stick ==
A two-handed variation of the centre stick has existed as a split stick, with a similar arrangement to a yoke as it is bifurcated for the pilot to operate with both hands. This is not only used to operate the aircraft but for the pilot to also use radar controls. For example, some variants of the F-8 Crusader used a split stick.

== Popularity ==
The centre stick is used in many military fighter jets such as the Eurofighter Typhoon and the Mirage III, but also in light aircraft such as Piper Cubs and the Diamond Aircraft line of products such as the DA20, DA40 and DA42.

This arrangement contrasts with the more recently developed "side-stick", which is used in such military fighter jets as the F-16, the F-35 Lightning II and Rafale and also on civil aircraft such as the Airbus A320.

== See also ==
- Index of aviation articles
- Aircraft flight control system
- Dual control (aviation)
- HOTAS
- Rudder pedals
- Side-stick
- Yoke (aeronautics)
