= Operability =

Operability is the ability to keep a piece of equipment, a system or a whole industrial installation in a safe and reliable functioning condition, according to pre-defined operational requirements.

In the development and implementation of industrial and civil plants, operability is generally defined in terms of performance and reliability, as well as the traceability of information relevant to the design, procurement, construction and commissioning of facilities.

In the context of systems engineering or information technology, operability refers to a system's ability to perform its functions effectively and efficiently, providing users with an accessible, intuitive, and obstacle-free interaction.

Operability is considered one of the non-functional requirements (also called “ilities”), and is closely related to the concepts of reliability, availability, scalability, testability and maintainability.

Operability also refers to whether or not a surgical operation can be performed to treat a patient with a reasonable degree of safety and chance of success.

== Operability of industrial plants ==
The following aspects are considered essential for evaluating the operability of an industrial plant:

- Reliability, Availability, and Maintainability (RAM): Aspects related to the rate of occurrence of plant failures and the ease with which the plant can be maintained and repaired.
- Controllability and Stability: The ability of automation and control systems to handle sudden disturbances (such as component failures, power surges, or abrupt changes in ambient temperature) while keeping critical system and equipment parameters within safe operating limits.
- Flexibility: The ability to operate the plant efficiently and safely while adapting to changes in market demand and the supply chain.
- Human Factors: Ease of operation, ergonomics, and safety for the professionals who operate and manage the plant.

== Operability assessment ==
Since the cost of physical interventions to correct operability issues in existing civil and industrial plants is very high, modern engineering practices incorporate operability assessment methods during the design phase:

- 3D Model Review: Analysis of the plant's three-dimensional digital model to verify that its components meet construction, operation, maintenance, and safety requirements.
- Hazard and Operability Study (HAZOP): A structured methodology used by multidisciplinary teams (designers, operators, and safety specialists) to qualitatively analyze risk factors, identifying hazards and operational issues within the facility.

== Operability in systems engineering ==
The operability of a computer system is associated with the following aspects:

- Effectiveness: The ability of software and related processes to meet predefined functional specifications, operating quickly and responsively even under heavy workloads.
- Reliability: The system should operate consistently while minimizing failures and errors.
- Maintainability: The system should support updates and maintenance without causing significant interruptions.
- Scalability: The ability to adapt to increased demand without loss of performance.
- Usability: Simplicity and ease of use of its interfaces.
- Documentation: Adequate documentation to support the operation and maintenance of the system.

== Normalization ==
Among the international standards that establish operability requirements, the following are noteworthy:

- IEC 61511: Addresses functional safety in the process industry, with a focus on Safety Instrumented Systems (SIS).
- IEC 61508: Covers the functional safety of electrical and electronic systems, establishing reliability and operability requirements.
- IEC 61882: Establishes criteria and methodology for HAZOP studies in industrial plants, identifying risks and operability issues.
- ISO 14224: Defines reliability and maintainability criteria for equipment used in oil and gas facilities.
- ISO/IEC 25010:2023: Defines quality, operability, and usability characteristics for software systems.
- ISO 9241-11: Covers, in Part 11 (Usability: Definitions and Concepts), ergonomic aspects of human–machine interaction.
