= 2018 in aviation =

This is a list of aviation-related events in 2018.

== Orders and deliveries ==
Up from 763 in 2017, Boeing delivered 806 commercial jets in 2018, including 580 737s and 145 787s; and won 893 net orders valued at $143.7 billion: 675 737s and 218 widebodies including 109 787s and 51 777s.

Airbus delivered 800 aircraft to 93 customers including 20 A220s (since July 2018), 626 A320s, 49 A330s, 93 A350XWBs and 12 A380s, 11% more than the 718 delivered in 2017; and received 747 net orders.

== Events ==
=== January ===
3 January
AeroVironment announces it will design and develop solar-powered high-altitude unmanned aircraft and ground control stations for a joint venture with Japanese telco SoftBank (95%) for $65 million.

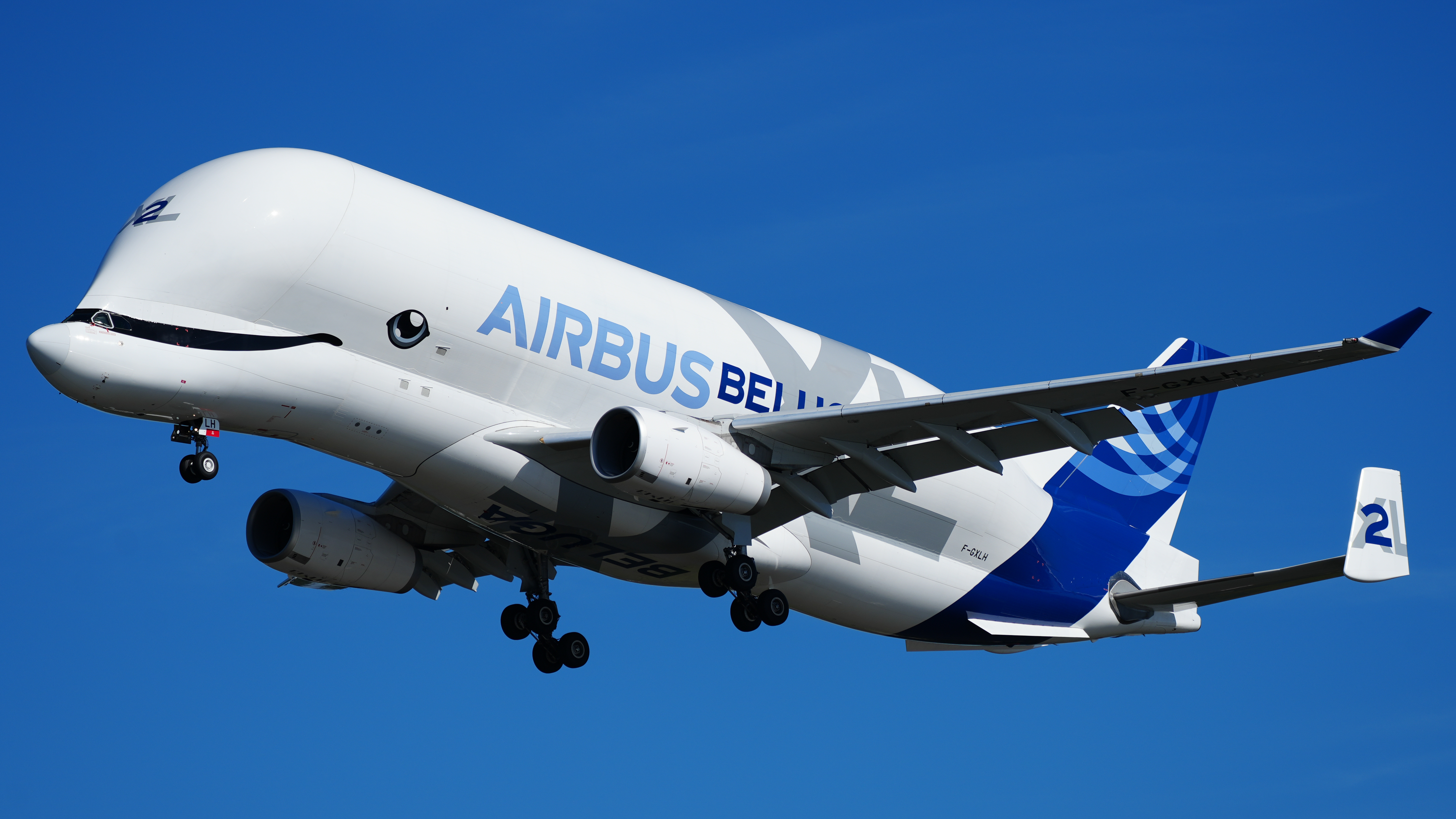
An Airbus Beluga XL

4 January
The first Airbus BelugaXL rolls off the assembly line, unpainted and without engines.
5 January
The A321neo Cabin Flex rolls out before ground tests and first flight in the following weeks, it should be delivered in mid-2018 and the layout will become the A321neo default from 2020.
9 January
Boeing announces it had won 912 net orders in 2017 for $134.8 billion at list prices including 745 737s, 94 787s and 60 777s, and delivered 763 airliners including 529 737s, 136 787s and 74 777s.
10 January
Geophysical technology company Ocean Infinity confirms the Government of Malaysia accepted its proposal to search for Malaysia Airlines Flight 370 and sends its vessel Seabed Constructor for 90 days, receiving a reward only if the wreckage is located.
The Canadian government files a complaint at the World Trade Organization against the USA over the CSeries dumping petition by Boeing.
China is set to order 184 Airbus A320 airliners, mainly for A320neo jets to be delivered to 13 airlines in 2019 and 2020, after French president Emmanuel Macron visited his Chinese counterpart Xi Jinping.
13 January
Pegasus Airlines Flight 8622, a Boeing 737-800, landing in Trabzon Airport from Ankara, runs off the left side of the runway and partially down a cliff, injuring no passengers or crew.
15 January
Airbus announces it received 1,109 net orders from 44 customers in 2017, and delivered 718 aircraft to 85 customers: 558 A320 Family (including 181 A320neo); 67 A330s; 78 A350 XWBs and 15 A380s.
18 January
Airbus secures a preliminary agreement from Emirates for up to 36 A380s: 20 potentially firm orders and 16 options, to be delivered from 2020, valued at $16 billion at list prices.
19 January
The Boeing 787-10 variant is approved by the FAA.
23 January
Following the Air Berlin insolvency, Austrian carrier Niki is sold to Laudamotion, controlled by former Formula 1 champion Niki Lauda, while IAG had previously tentatively acquired its assets for €20 million ($24 million) at the end of 2017 before the proceedings were re-opened.
24 January
The revised NAL Saras-PTN1 with 14 seats instead of 19 and improved systems first flew from HAL Airport for 40 minutes, reaching 8,500 ft (2,600 m) and 145 kn (269 km/h) before 20 flights to freeze the production design.
26 January
In the CSeries dumping petition by Boeing, the USITC four commissioners unanimously determined the U.S. industry is not threatened and no duty orders will be issued.
31 January
The Airbus A³ Vahana full-scale single passenger prototype makes its maiden flight self-piloted in Pendleton, Oregon, reaching 5 meters (16 feet) over 53 seconds.

=== February ===
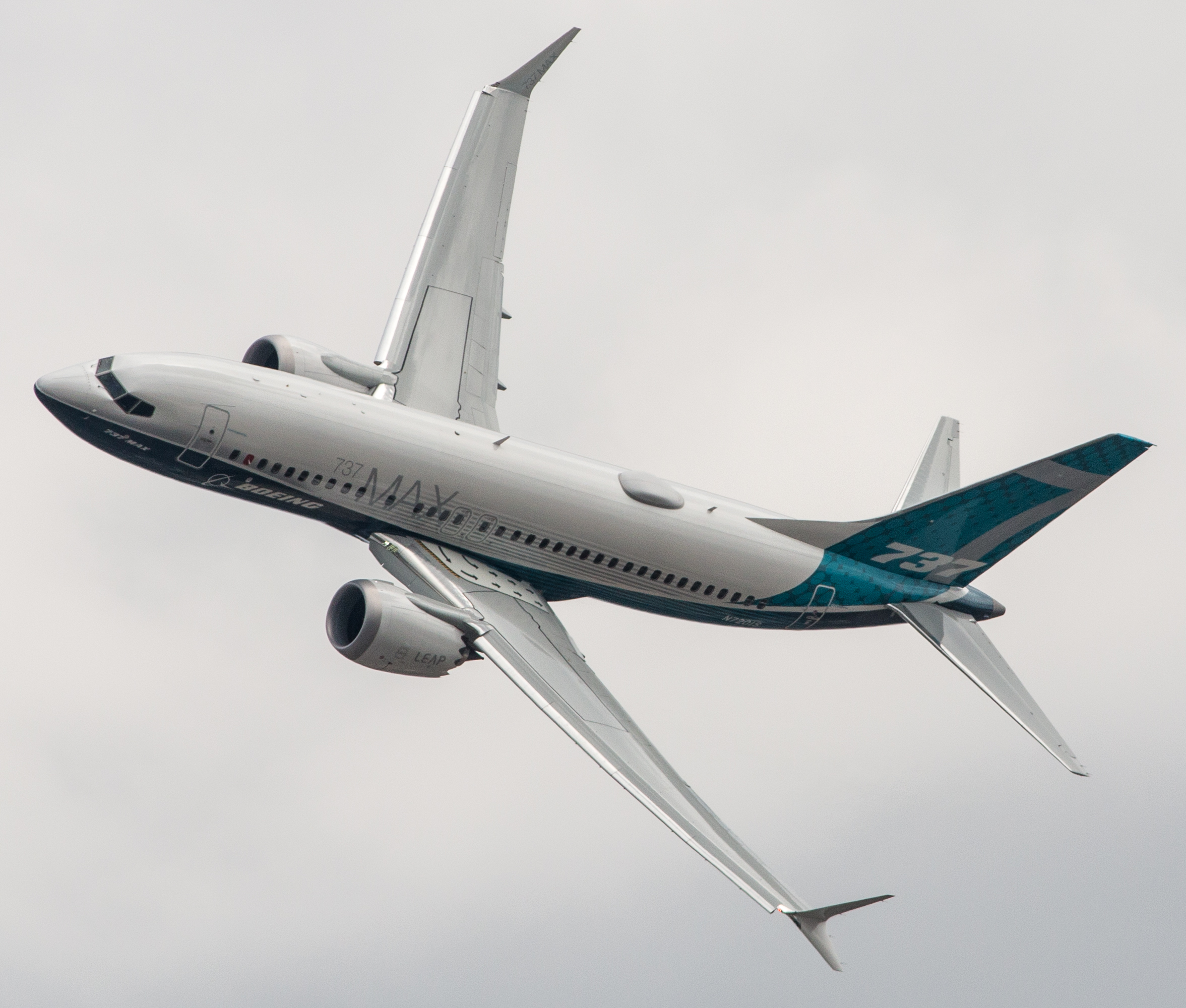
A Boeing 737 MAX 7

1 February
Amid surging global demand, UPS orders 14 Boeing 747-8F and four Boeing 767 freighters worth $7.3 billion at list prices.
5 February
The smallest Boeing 737 MAX 7 is rolled-out in Renton, Washington, before flight testing in coming weeks; first delivery and introduction by Southwest Airlines was scheduled for 2019.
6 February
Singapore Airshow is held 6–11 February.
7 February
A light Business Jet, the first Pilatus PC-24 is delivered to PlaneSense.
9 February
After in-flight failures of PW1100G turbofans with its high pressure compressor aft hub modified –apparently problems of its knife edge seal, the EASA and Airbus grounds some Airbus A320neo aircraft until they are fitted with spares.
11 February
Saratov Airlines Flight 703, an Antonov An-148-100B, crashed shortly after takeoff from Domodedovo Airport killing all 71 people on board.
13 February
United Airlines Flight 1175, a Boeing 777-222 registered as N773UA, suffered an in-flight separation of a fan blade on the right engine over the Pacific Ocean. The pilots continued flying for 120 miles and then executed an emergency landing at its destination airport.
16 February
Boeing announces the 737 MAX-9 variant is certified, clearing it for introduction with Lion Air.
18 February
Iran Aseman Airlines Flight 3704, an ATR 72-200, flying from Tehran to Yasuj, crashed into the Zagros Mountains, south of Ispahan after it disappeared from radar, 50 minutes after taking off from Mehrabad Airport, killing all 66 people on board.
20 February

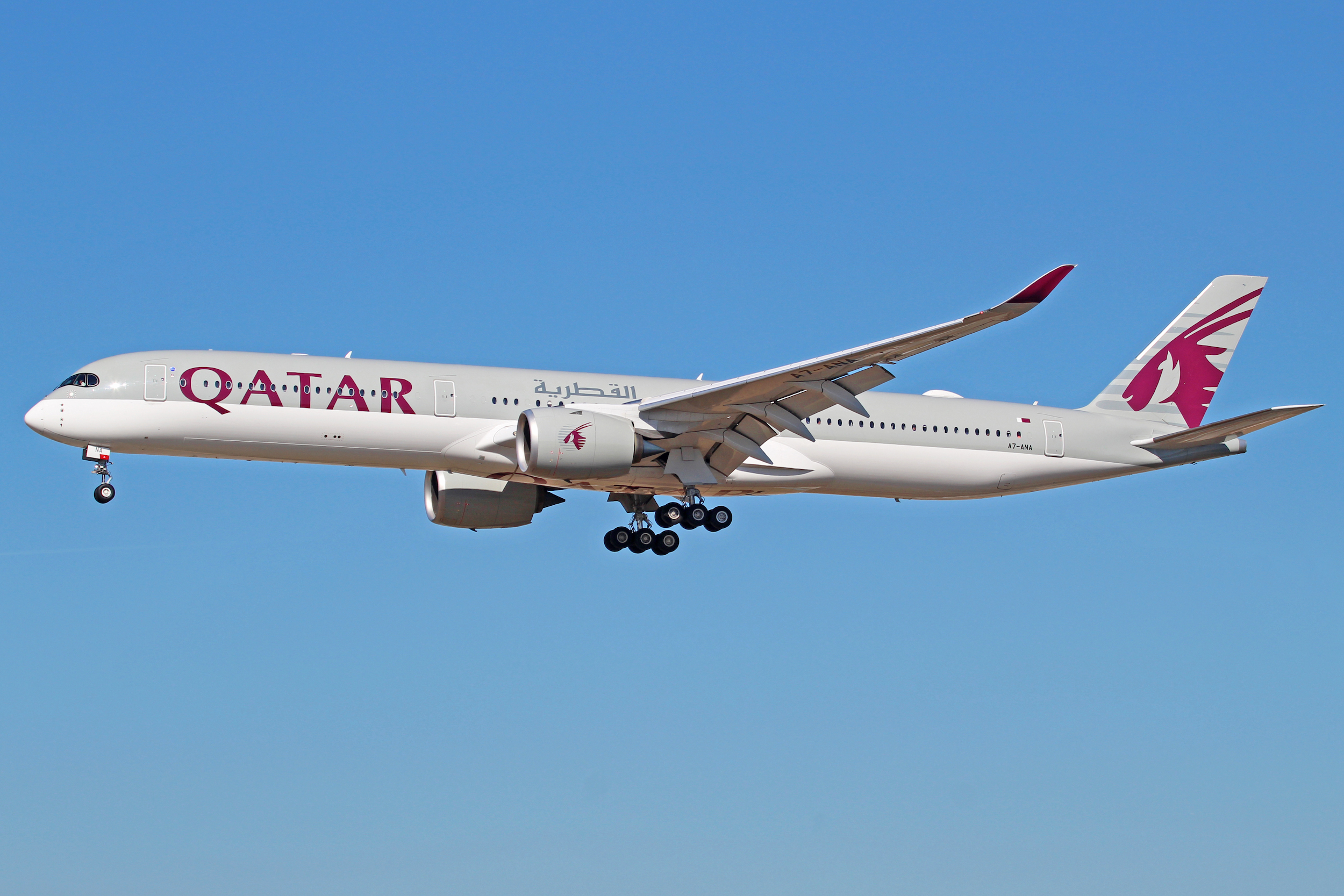
The first Airbus A350-1000 of Qatar Airways

The first stretched A350-1000 is delivered to Qatar Airways, and will be introduced on its London Heathrow route on 24 February.
28 February
Dassault Aviation unveils the Falcon 6X large business jet based on the Falcon 5X: it should make its first flight in early 2021 and begin deliveries in 2022.
Embraer receives its type certificate from the ANAC, FAA and EASA for the first member of the E-Jets E2 family, the E190-E2.

=== March ===
6 March
An Antonov An-26 of the Russian Air Force crashes shortly before landing at Syria killing all 39 occupants onboard.
9 March
Turkish Airlines ordered 25 Boeing 787-9 and 25 Airbus A350-900 with five options each, to be delivered from 2019 to 2024, as the catalogue price of the A350s alone is $9.5 billion.
11 March
A Turkish Bombardier Challenger CL-604, registered as TC-TRB, crashed in the Zagros Mountains near Shahr-e Kord, Iran, killing all 11 people on board.
12 March
US-Bangla Airlines Flight 211, a Bombardier Dash 8 Q400 registered as S2-AGU, crashed while landing at Tribhuvan International Airport near Kathmandu, killing 51 of the 71 people on board.
13 March

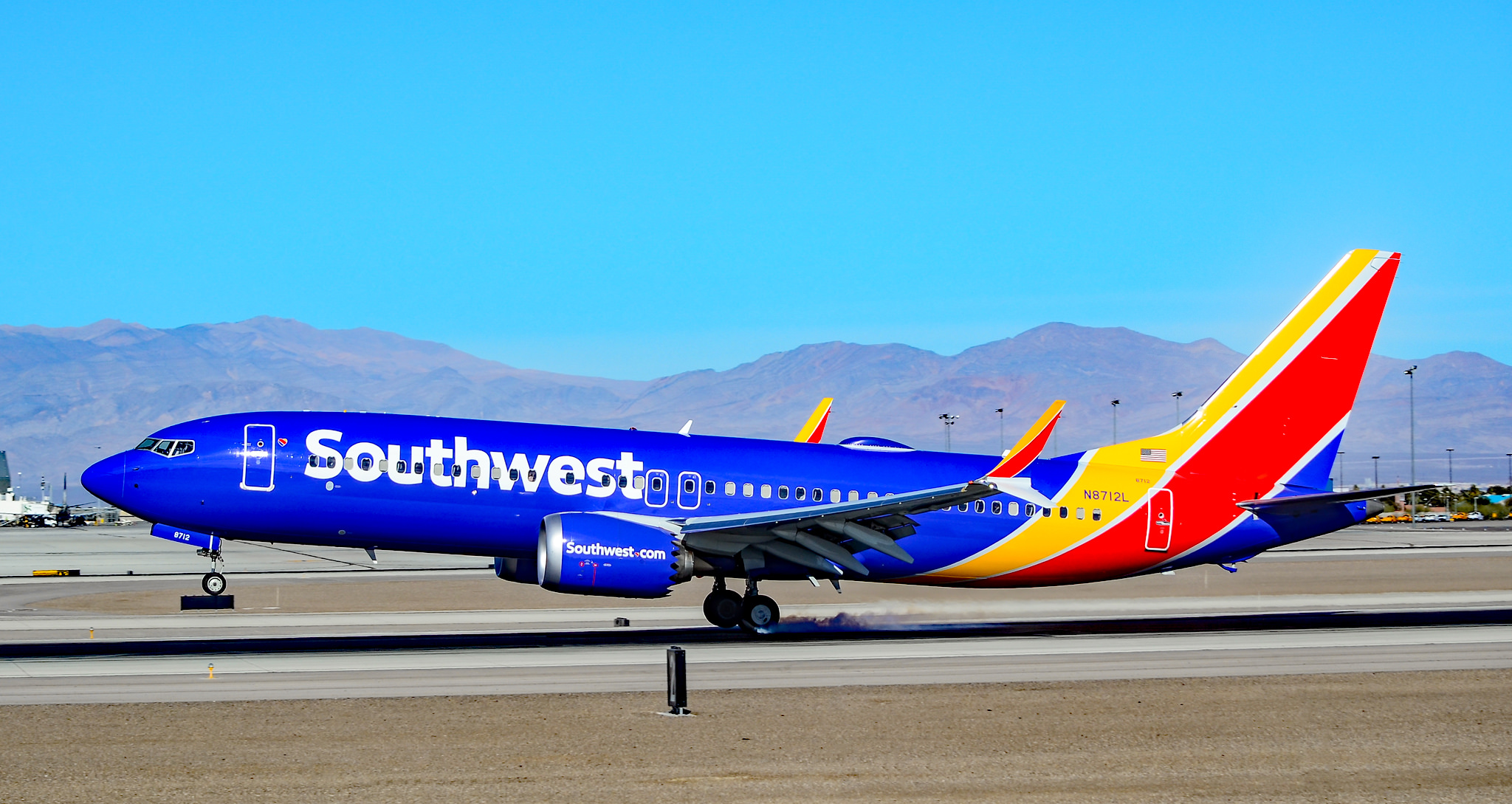
The 10,000th Boeing 737 is rolled-out on 13 March, a MAX 8 for Southwest like the one pictured

The 10,000th Boeing 737 is rolled-out, a MAX 8 destined for Southwest Airlines: continuously manufactured since 1967, over 4,600 orders are pending.
The General Electric GE9X, the Boeing 777X engine, makes its first flight.
16 March
The smallest 737 MAX 7 took off for its first flight from its Renton factory for three hours, reached 250 kn (460 km/h) and 25,000 ft (7,600 m), and landed in Moses Lake, WA, Boeing's flight test centre.
20 March
Ryanair announces it will acquire - subject to EU Competition approval - 75% of Austrian airline Laudamotion, built from the assets of the former Niki including A320 airliners, for €50m plus €50m for year 1 start up and operating costs, aiming for profitability by year 3 and a fleet of 30.
21 March
Asian low-cost carrier Lion Air Group takes delivery of the first stretched 737 MAX 9 before entering service with Thai Lion Air.
22 March
Boeing declines to appeal the US ITC ruling in its CSeries dumping petition.
All Nippon Airways announces the integration of its two low cost carrier subsidiaries Peach Aviation and Vanilla Air, starting in the second half of the FY2018 and to be completed by the end of FY2019 into Peach, planning over 50 aircraft beyond FY2020, up from 35 today, operating on more than 50 routes, up from 39 currently, and targeting a ¥150 (1.37) billion revenue and a 10% operating profit for FY2020.

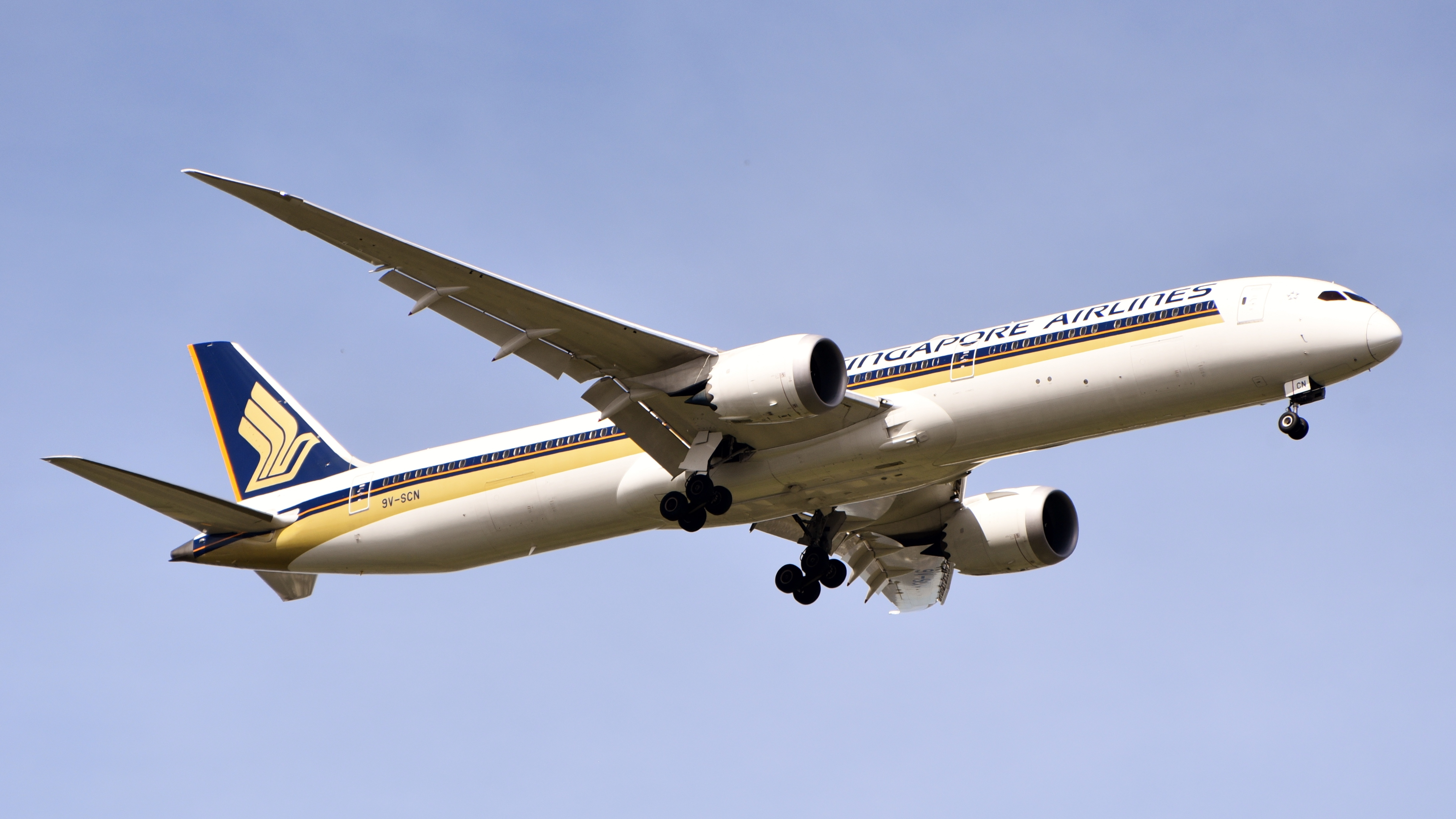
A Boeing 787-10 belonging to Singapore Airlines

25 March
Boeing delivers the first stretched 787-10 to Singapore Airlines.
26 March
Founded in 1977 and once the largest provider of US Essential Air Service from 1992 to 2002, Great Lakes Airlines stopped scheduled passenger flights due to pilot shortage caused by US regulations requiring first officers to have 1,500 flight hours, up from 250 hours since 2013, leaving a fleet of 28 Beechcraft 1900Ds and six Embraer 120s, but continue to support Aerodynamics Inc. flights.
29 March
A takeover bid of £8.1 billion ($11.4 billion), up from £7 billion initially in January, from turnaround specialist Melrose Industries for UK aerostructure specialist GKN is accepted by a majority of the later's shareholders, while Melrose aims for an over £10 billion market capitalisation.

=== April ===
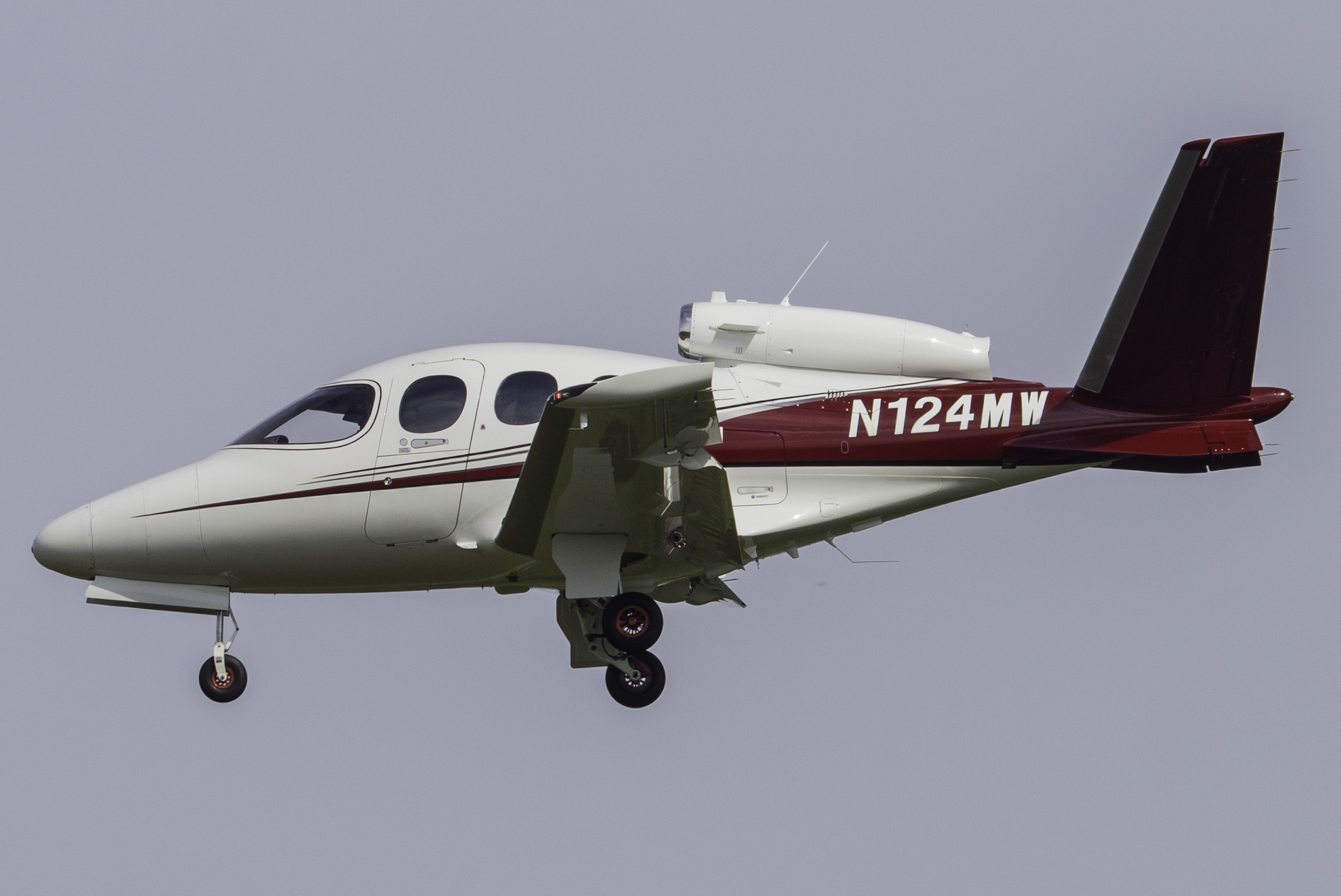
The Cirrus Vision SF50 is awarded the 2017 Collier Trophy on 4 April

1 April
The 100th anniversary of the formation of Royal Air Force on 1 April 1918 in the United Kingdom it is the oldest independent air force in the world.
2 April
NASA awards Lockheed Martin a $247.5 million contract to design, build and deliver in late 2021 the Quiet Supersonic Technology Low-Boom X-plane.
3 April
Already a Boeing 737 MAX 8 customer, Indian Jet Airways order 75 more, not disclosing the variant, valued at $7.2 to $9.7 billion before customary discounts.
4 April
Cirrus Aircraft is awarded the 2017 Collier Trophy for designing, certifying, and entering-into-service the SF50 Vision, the first single-engine personal jet.
China proposes 25% tariffs on Boeing airliners in retaliation to Trump tariffs, with a weight cap apparently to leave negotiations open.
Widerøe takes delivery of its first of three 114-seat Embraer 190-E2 in Sao Jose dos Campos.
6 April
Adding to its previous order for 42, American Airlines orders 47 Boeing 787s, 22 -8s and 25 -9s, for over $12 billion at list prices. American simultaneously cancels its 22 Airbus A350s order originally placed by US Airways.
11 April
In northern Algeria, an Algerian Air Force Il-76 transport plane crashes shortly after take-off from Boufarik Airport, killing its 257 occupants.
17 April
A failure of the left engine on Southwest Airlines Flight 1380 broke a window, causing a passenger to be partially sucked out. That person died and seven other people were injured. The plane was flying from New York's LaGuardia Airport to Dallas Love Field and made an emergency landing at Philadelphia International Airport.
24 April
Widerøe introduces the Embraer 190-E2 between Bergen and Tromsø, Norway.
Virgin America made its final flight from San Francisco to Los Angeles before being taken over by Alaska Airlines.
25 April
ILA Berlin Air Show is held 25–29 April.

=== May ===
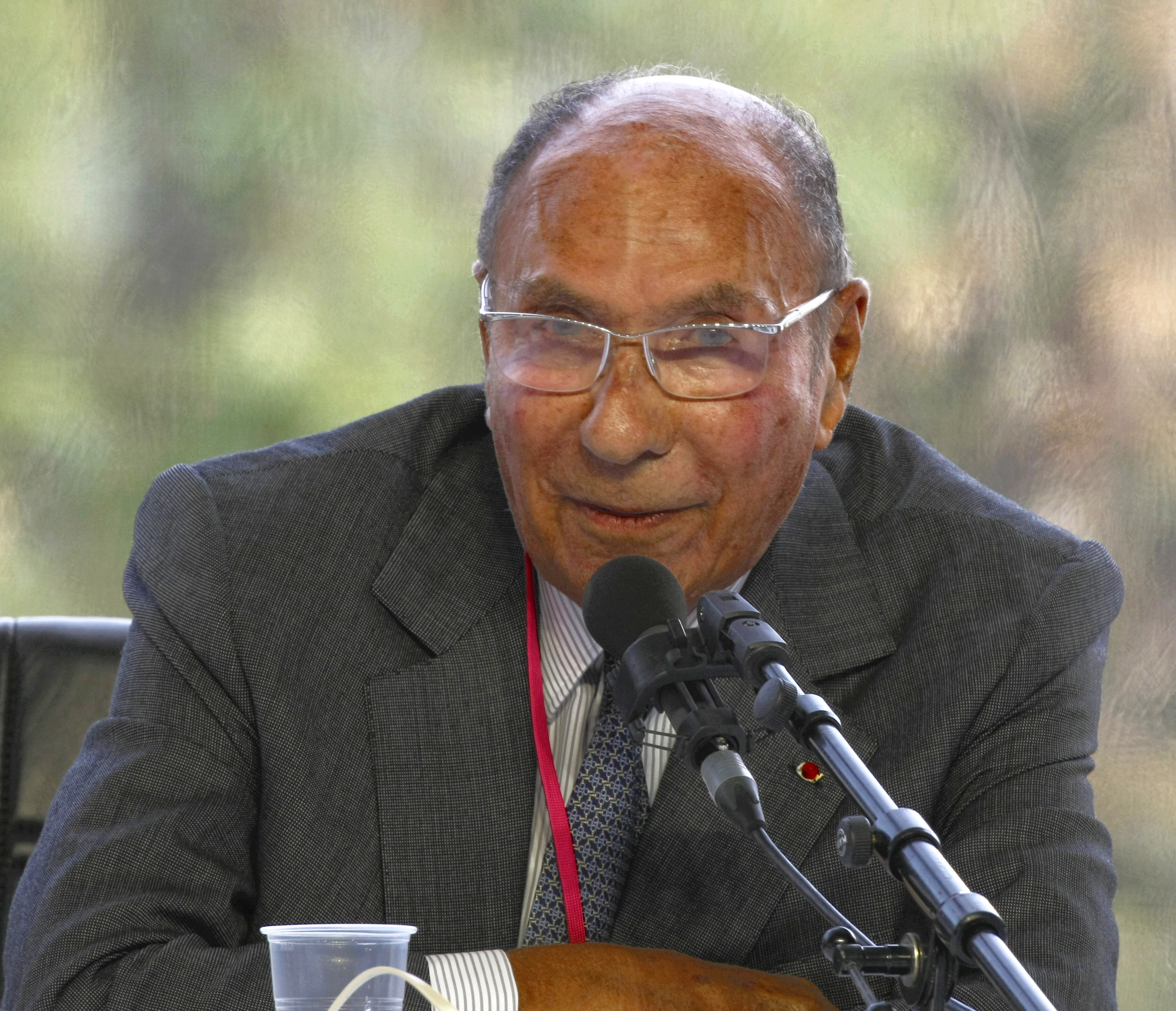
Serge Dassault dies at 93 on 28 May

1 May
Boeing acquires aircraft parts manufacturer KLX, Inc for $3.2 billion, valuing it at $4.25 billion including $1 billion of net debt. In over 15 countries, KLX sells $1.4 billion per year of fasteners and consumables within its 1 million items catalog, and will be integrated within Aviall with its 2,000 employees.
2 May
A Lockheed WC-130H of the Puerto Rican Air National Guard crashed shortly after take-off after an engine failure killing all nine occupants onboard.
3 May
BAE Systems and Prismatic Ltd announce their collaboration to develop the 150 kg (330 lb), 35 m (115 ft) wingspan BAE Systems PHASA-35 solar powered high altitude UAV for flight tests in 2019, offering a one year endurance for surveillance and communications alternatively to satellites.
4 May
Air France-KLM CEO Jean-Marc Janaillac resigns after 55% of the airline's staff rejected a 7% wage increase over 4 years proposal.
7 May
At the ICAO, the North Korean Government requests to launch routes between its capital Pyongyang and South Korea capital Seoul through Air Koryo after the 2018 inter-Korean summit.
8 May
United States President Donald Trump withdraws from the Iran Nuclear Deal, effectively cancelling $38 billion of Airbus and Boeing orders from Iran Air.
11 May
Challenged by four unions representing 135,000 airline workers, the US Department of Transportation approval for Norwegian Air International is maintained by a judicial panel.
14 May
An Airbus A319 from Sichuan Airlines Flight 8633, departing Chongqing Jiangbei International Airport and bounded to Lhasa Gonggar Airport, diverts to Chengdu Shuangliu International Airport after its right windshield cracked and blew off in cruise at 33,000 feet (FL330) without any fatalities.
15 May
Air France-KLM's board of directors adopt a transitional management, with Anne-Marie Couderc as non-executive Chairman and a management committee composed of Frédéric Gagey, AF-KLM's CFO,as CEO and spokesperson, fr:Franck Terner, Air France CEO, and Pieter Elbers, KLM CEO.
Subject to regulatory approval, Air France-KLM, Delta Air Lines and Virgin Atlantic agrees on their expanded joint venture on transatlantic flights; Air France-KLM will acquire 31% of Virgin Atlantic from Virgin Group for £220 million which will retain 20% and Chairmanship while Delta will retain its 49%.
In the WTO dispute between Airbus and Boeing, the WTO concludes that the Airbus A380 and Airbus A350 received improper subsidies through repayable launch aids or low interest rates; Boeing claims victory but Airbus counters it is thin with 94% of the complaints rejected, and US tariffs could see retaliation from the EU.
17 May
Following the mid-March 2018 completion of its restoration for display at the National Museum of the United States Air Force, the B-17F Memphis Belle, the first World War II 8th Air Force American heavy bomber to complete its then-25-mission tour of duty in the European Theater of World War II is officially unveiled to the public.
18 May
A Boeing 737-200, Cubana de Aviación Flight 972 crashes after taking off at José Martí International Airport, claiming 112 fatalities and leaving one survivor.
25 May
After their Joint Investigation Team determined the Buk missile which downed MH17 belonged to the Russian army, the Government of the Netherlands and Government of Australia hold Russia responsible for the death of its 298 occupants.
27 May
Bombardier unveils its Global Express 5500 and 6500 developments expected to enter service at the end of 2019 with an optimized wing, a revamped cabin and new more efficient Rolls-Royce Pearl engines for better operating costs, performance and range.
28 May
Serge Dassault, son of founder Marcel Dassault, former chairman and CEO of Dassault Aviation from 1986 to 2000, initiator of the Dassault Falcon business jet family, dies at 93.
29 May
EBACE is held 29–31 May in Geneva.
As the Malaysian government changes, Ocean Infinity's search for Malaysia Airlines Flight 370 ends.

=== June ===
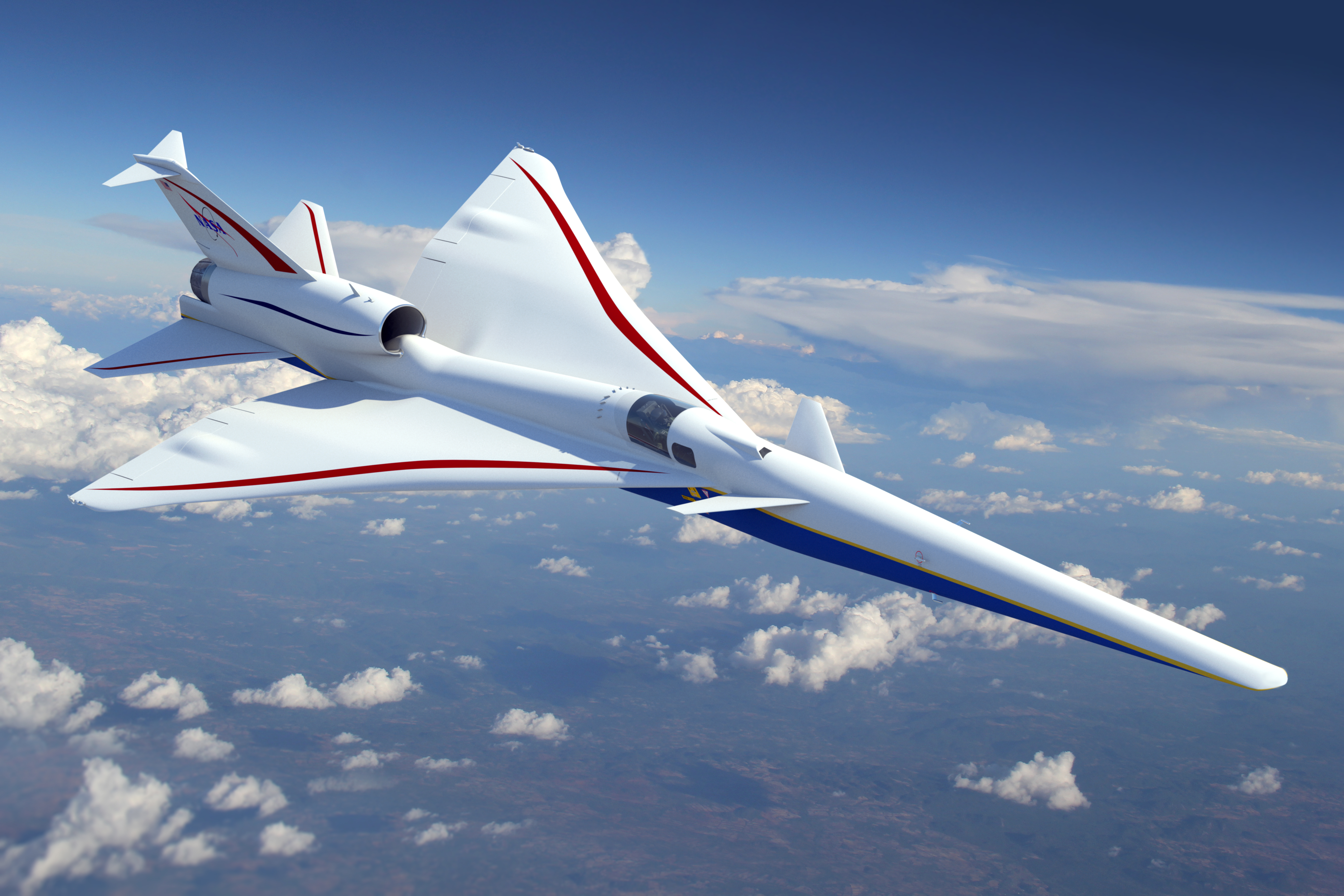
The NASA Low-Boom Flight Demonstrator is named X-59 QueSST

4 June
Boeing and Safran announce their 50-50 partnership to design, build and service APUs after regulatory and antitrust clearance in the second half of 2018.
8 June
After having gained regulatory approval, Airbus and Bombardier announce that Airbus will get a majority stake of the CSeries on 1 July 2018, leaving its main operations in Mirabel, Québec as Bombardier will fund its cash shortfalls for up to US$610 million till 2021.
12 June
NASA flies a 36 feet long by 66-foot (11 by 20-meter) demilitarised MQ-9 Predator for the first time through the National Airspace System with no chase aircraft and controlled from Armstrong Flight Research Center, towards unmanned aircraft operations in civil airspace.
14 June
Along a larger and modernised delivery centre, Airbus inaugurates its fourth Hamburg A320 production line, with two seven-axis robots to drill 80% of fuselage upper side holes, autonomous mobile tooling platforms and following Design Thinking principles.
Rolls-Royce plc announces its restructuring, cutting 4,600 jobs to save £400m per year by 2020. Two-thirds of the cuts will happen in Britain where 26,000 work including 15,700 at the Derby headquarters among 55,000 worldwide.
26 June
The US Air Force informed NASA it had assigned the X-59 QueSST designation to the Low Boom Flight Demonstrator.
28 June
After failing to place two Airbus A380s, lessor Dr. Peters should decide to tear them down over two years for $80 million per aircraft.

=== July ===
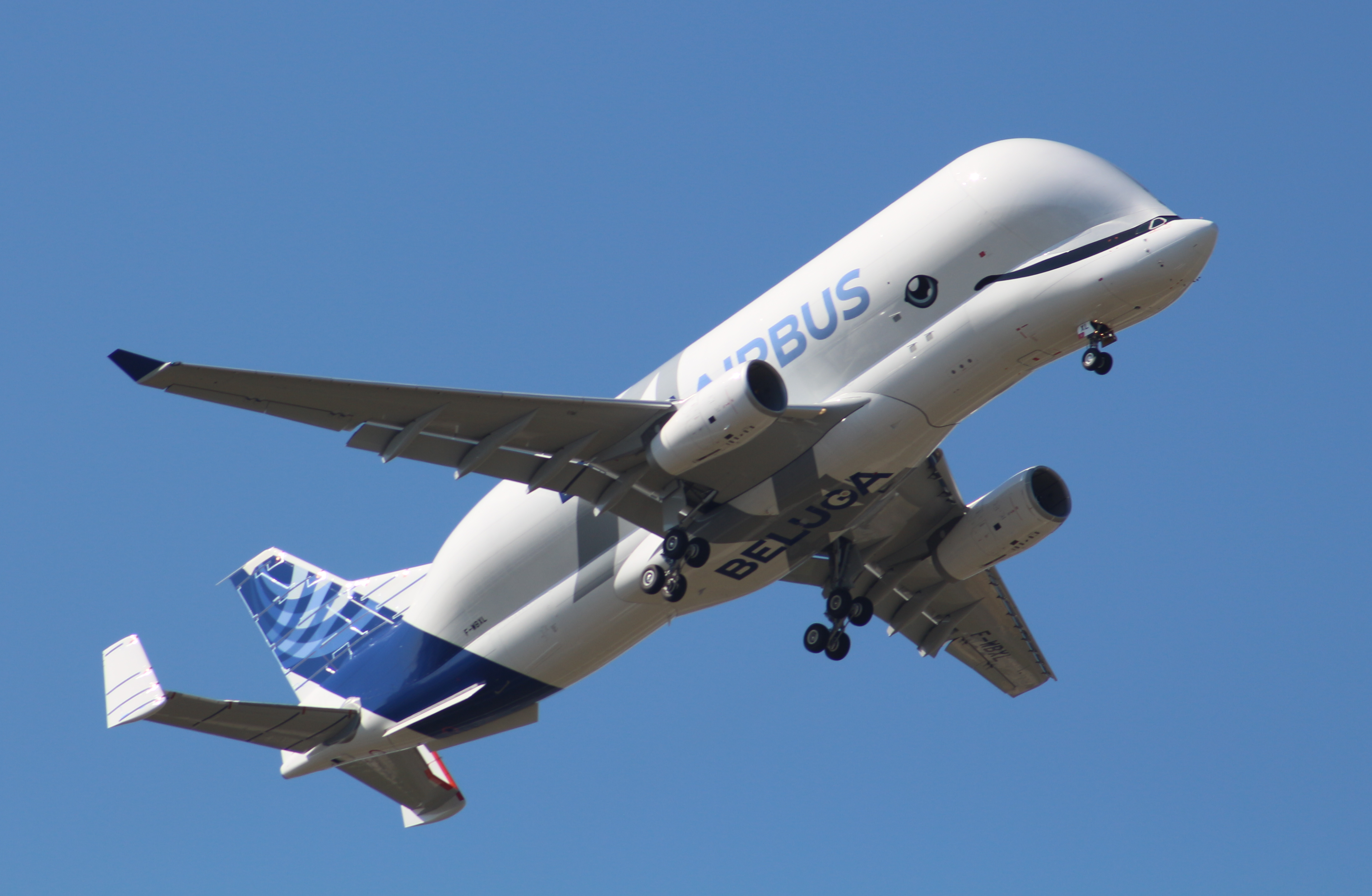
The Airbus Beluga successor, the Airbus A330-based BelugaXL, makes its first flight on 19 July.

5 July
A Memorandum of Understanding is announced for a strategic partnership: for $3.8 billion Boeing will hold 80% of a Boeing-Embraer joint venture for Embraers's airliners and services, valued at $4.75 billion, and Embraer will own the remaining 20%.
10 July
Ten days after taking control of the program, Airbus renames the Bombardier CSeries Airbus A220-100/300.
Hours after its rebrand, JetBlue ordered 60 A220-300s to replace its 60 Embraer 190s from 2020 for $5.4 billion before customary discounts, with 60 options pending from 2025, a blow to Embraer which was marketing the E195-E2 to the carrier.
A Convair 340, while operating a test flight in preparation for its delivery flight, crashes shortly after take-off after suffering an engine failure. Out of the 19 occupants on board, 17 survive.
16 July
Farnborough International Airshow was held 16–22 July.
17 July
Valencia-based Air Nostrum and Dublin-bound CityJet announce their cooperation to create the largest European regional airline, subject to regulatory approval, employing 2700 people and flying 94 aircraft including 30 CRJ1000 and 22 CRJ900, for a combined revenue of €700m with over 170,000 flights per year.
A February agreement was formalized for two Boeing 747-8 at $3.9 billion to replace from December 2024 the two Boeing 747-200-based Air Force One Boeing VC-25A presidential aircraft delivered in 1991.
19 July
The Airbus BelugaXL oversized freighter makes its maiden flight.
At the end of Farnborough International Airshow business days, Embraer sold 300 jets for $15 billion at list prices, including 100 firm orders and 100 options for the E175-E1s from US carrier Republic Airways, convertible to E2s; Airbus sold 431 airliners (93 firm and 338 MoUs): 60 A220-300s, 304 A320s, 42 A330neos and 25 A350XWBs; Boeing signed 673 aircraft to 21 customers for a $98.4 billion list value, 145 of these were unidentified prior to the airshow, leaving 528 airshow sales. Of those 673, Boeing secured 564 Boeing 737 MAXs including 110 MAX 10s, 52 Dreamliners, 48 777Fs and five 747-8Fs.
23 July
EAA AirVenture Oshkosh is held 23–29 July.
28 July
Air Vanuatu Flight 241, an ATR 72-500 suffered a runway excursion during an emergency landing. Consequently, the aircraft collided with two empty Britten-Norman BN-2 Islanders. All 43 occupants onboard the ATR 72 survived.
31 July
Aeroméxico Connect Flight 2431, an Embraer 190, crashed after takeoff from Durango International Airport in Mexico with 101 persons on board and no fatalities.

=== August ===
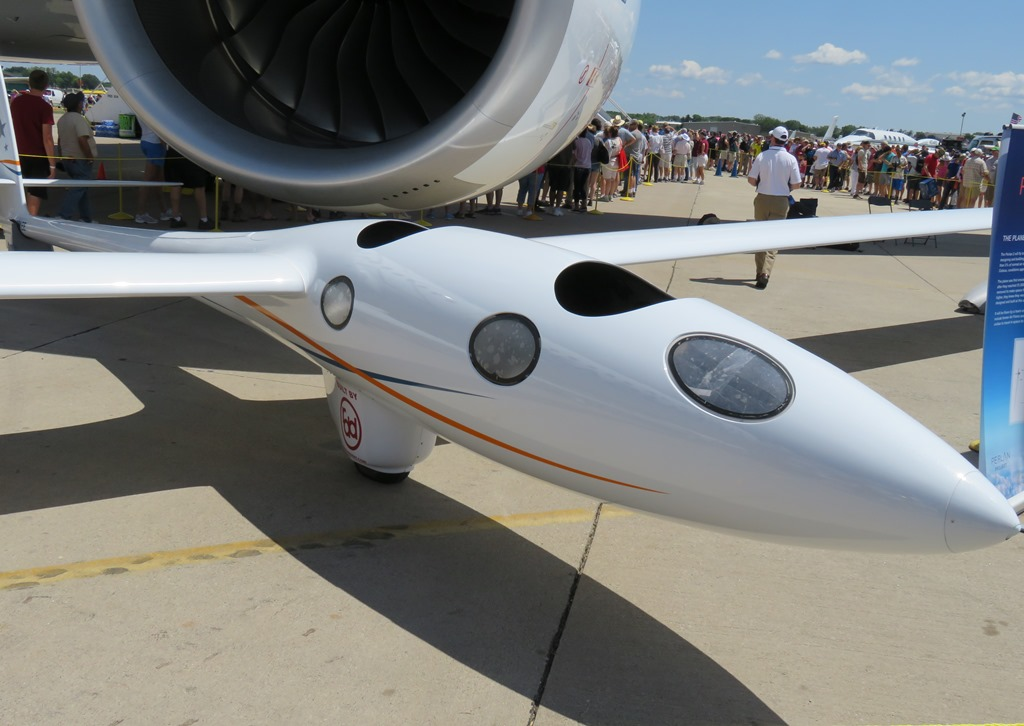
The Perlan II reached 60,669 ft / 18,492 m without an engine

4 August
A historic Junkers Ju 52 crashes in the Swiss Alps in a Ju-Air sightseeing flight, killing all its 20 occupants.
8 August
Airbus announces its Zephyr S remained aloft for 25 days 23h 57min for its maiden flight from Arizona, nearly twice as long as the previous record flight of 14 days set by its predecessor.
10 August
A Horizon Air Dash 8 Q400 is stolen from Seattle–Tacoma Airport by Richard Russell, a ground service agent, ultimately killed when crashing on Ketron Island in Puget Sound.
Ryanair cancels 20% of its fights in Europe, mostly in Germany, as pilots staged strikes to support their claims.
A mid-air collision between an unmanned aerial vehicle and a hot air balloon occurs in Driggs, Idaho, United States; the first reported to the NTSB.
16 August
The Air France-KLM Board of Directors appoints Air Canada's Benjamin Smith as its Chief Executive Officer before 30 September 2018.
XiamenAir Flight 8667, a Boeing 737-85C (WL) registered as B-5498, suffered a runway excursion while landing in the Philippines. All 165 occupants survived the accident.
26 August
Within the Airbus Perlan Mission II from El Calafate (Patagonia, Argentina), the Perlan II sets a new unofficial flight altitude record without an engine of 60,669 ft / 18,492 m GPS (61,982 ft / 18,892 m pressure altitude), piloted by Jim Payne and Morgan Sandercock : the third time ever high altitude wave soaring occurred above the tropopause.
29 August
After a seven years run, Swiss regional SkyWork Airlines cease operations after fleet renewal efforts failed to improve the business.
31 August
Boeing Phantom Works wins the MQ-25 carrier-based unmanned aerial tanker competition with its Stingray to build four prototypes for $805 million, to fly in 2021, before a $3.8 billion development and $9.2 billion to build 72 aircraft from 2024, beating General Atomics Aeronautical Systems and Lockheed Martin Skunk Works.

=== September ===
1 September
Utair Flight 579, a Boeing 737-800, registration VQ-BJI, on a flight from Vnukovo with 164 passengers and 6 crew, overran the runway and caught fire while landing in Sochi, injuring 18 people. One airport worker suffered a heart attack and couldn't be revived.
2 September
Within the Airbus Perlan Mission II, Jim Payne and Tim Gardner reached an altitude of 76,124 ft (23,203 m), surpassing the 73,737 ft (22,475 m) attained by Jerry Hoyt on 17 April 1989 in a Lockheed U-2: the highest subsonic flight.

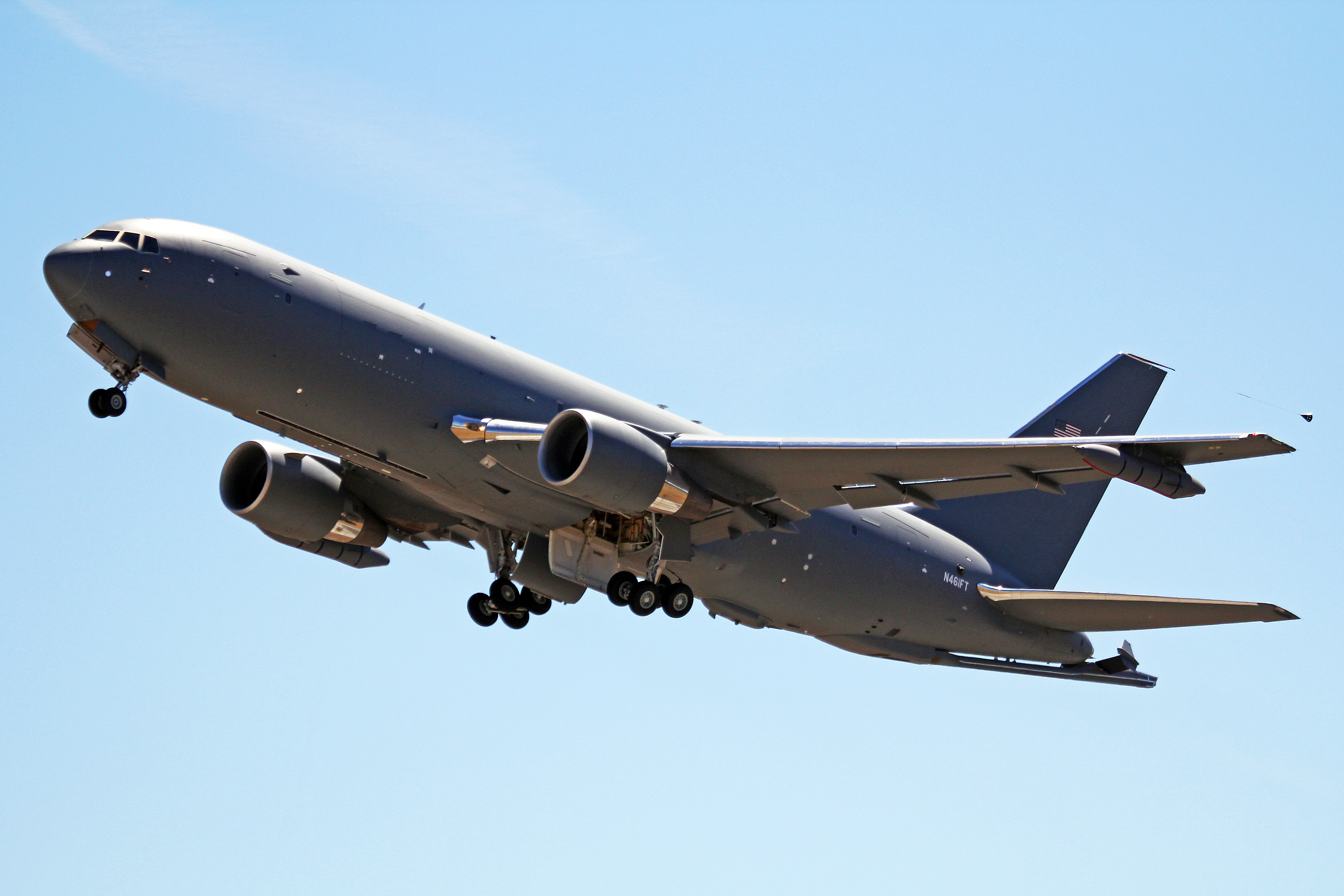
A Boeing KC-46 Pegasus

4 September
Boeing announces the Boeing KC-46 FAA certification.
6 September
Dassault Aviation and Safran ends their dispute over the Silvercrest engine for the Falcon 5X with US$280 million compensatory damages.
The Turkish Aerospace TAI T625 6 t (13,000 lb) MTOW helicopter makes a 10 min first flight from Ankara powered by two LHTEC CTS800s; the 165 kn (306km/h) max, 400 nmi (740km) range aircraft development began in 2010, certification including from EASA is targeted in 2020 and production from 2021.
8 September
The first assembled Boeing 777X rolls out in Everett, Washington: a non-flying airplane to be ground tested over a year.
9 September
A Let L-410UVP crashes while landing at Yirol Airport in South Sudan, killing 20 out of the 23 occupants onboard.
13 September
Eric Schulz left the Airbus Chief Commercial Officer role, to be replaced by Christian Scherer, CEO of ATR since October 2016.
17 September
ATR replaces Christian Scherer as its chief executive by Stefano Bortoli, president of ATR's board and Leonardo aircraft's senior vice-president for strategy and marketing.

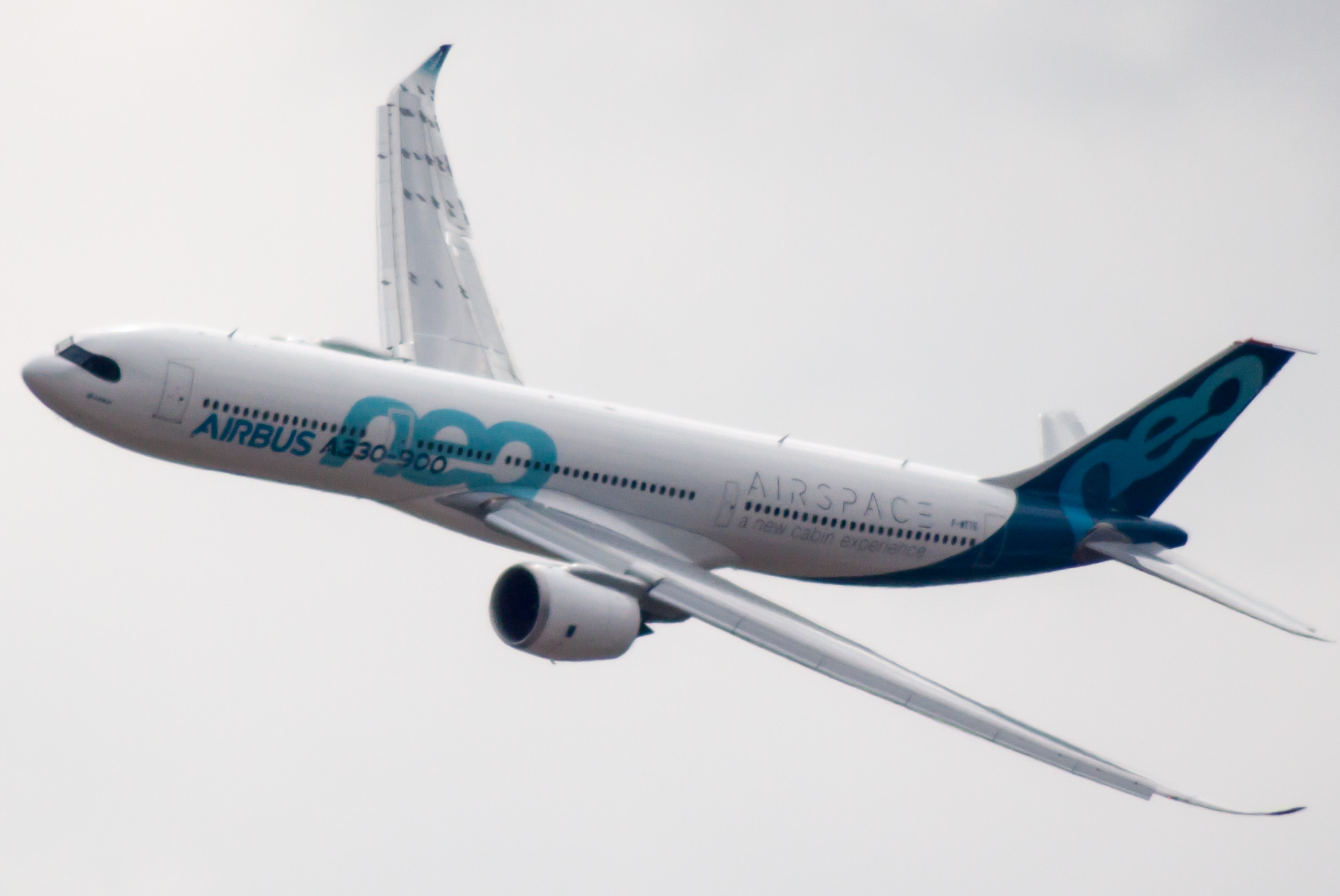
The Airbus A330neo got its type certificate from the EASA on 26 September

26 September
EASA grants the Airbus A330neo-941 type certificate, including beyond 180 min ETOPS.
27 September
The first Gulfstream G500 is delivered.
Boeing wins the U.S. Air Force $9.2 billion T-X program for 351 jets, 46 simulators and the associated ground equipment with the Boeing T-X trainer, designed with Saab. The original design defeated the Lockheed Martin T-50A based on the Korea Aerospace Industries FA-50, and the Leonardo T-100 based on the Alenia Aermacchi M-346. The initial $813 million order provides for the development of the first five aircraft and seven simulators, to be delivered in 2023, for an initial operational capability by 2024 and full operational capability by 2034.
28 September
Transport Canada awards the Bombardier Global 7500 its type certification.
Air Niugini Flight 73, a Boeing 737-800, unintentionally ditches 135 meters short of the runway and came to rest in a lagoon at Chuuk International Airport in the Federated States of Micronesia, with one person being killed while all other 34 passengers and 12 crew escaped serious injury.

=== October ===
1 October
Darryl Greenamyer, American air racing and test pilot dies aged 82.
2 October
As it lacks funds to continue after 14 years, Northern European carrier Primera Air cease operations ahead of the winter season, after grounded aircraft and delivery delays led to flight cancellations, revenue loss and costly leases, exacerbated by low fares and high fuel costs.
8 October
The Airbus board of directors selects Guillaume Faury to succeed Tom Enders as CEO from 10 April 2019.
12 October
Singapore Airlines lands the world's Longest Flight in New York/Newark from Singapore Changi after 17 h 52 mn, in an Airbus A350-900ULR in two-classes, with 67 Business seats and 94 Premium Economy seats. The flight covered 16,562 km (8,943 nmi) for a 15,353 km (8,290 nmi) orthodromic distance.
14 October
Embraer introduces the Praetor 500 and 600 business jets with 3,250 nmi and 3,900 nmi of range, to be certified in 2019. Both have larger winglets, the 500 boosts the fuel capacity of the Legacy 450 while the 600 is based on the Legacy 500 with tanks on the fuselage belly and more powerful engines.
15 October
Fractional operator NetJets announced the purchase of up to 325 Cessna Citations for nearly $10 billion: 175 Citation Longitude, sold for $26 million each, and up to 150 Citation Hemispheres, priced at $35 million.
16 October
NBAA convention is held 16–18 October in Orlando.
Helitech is held 16–18 October in Amsterdam.
17 October

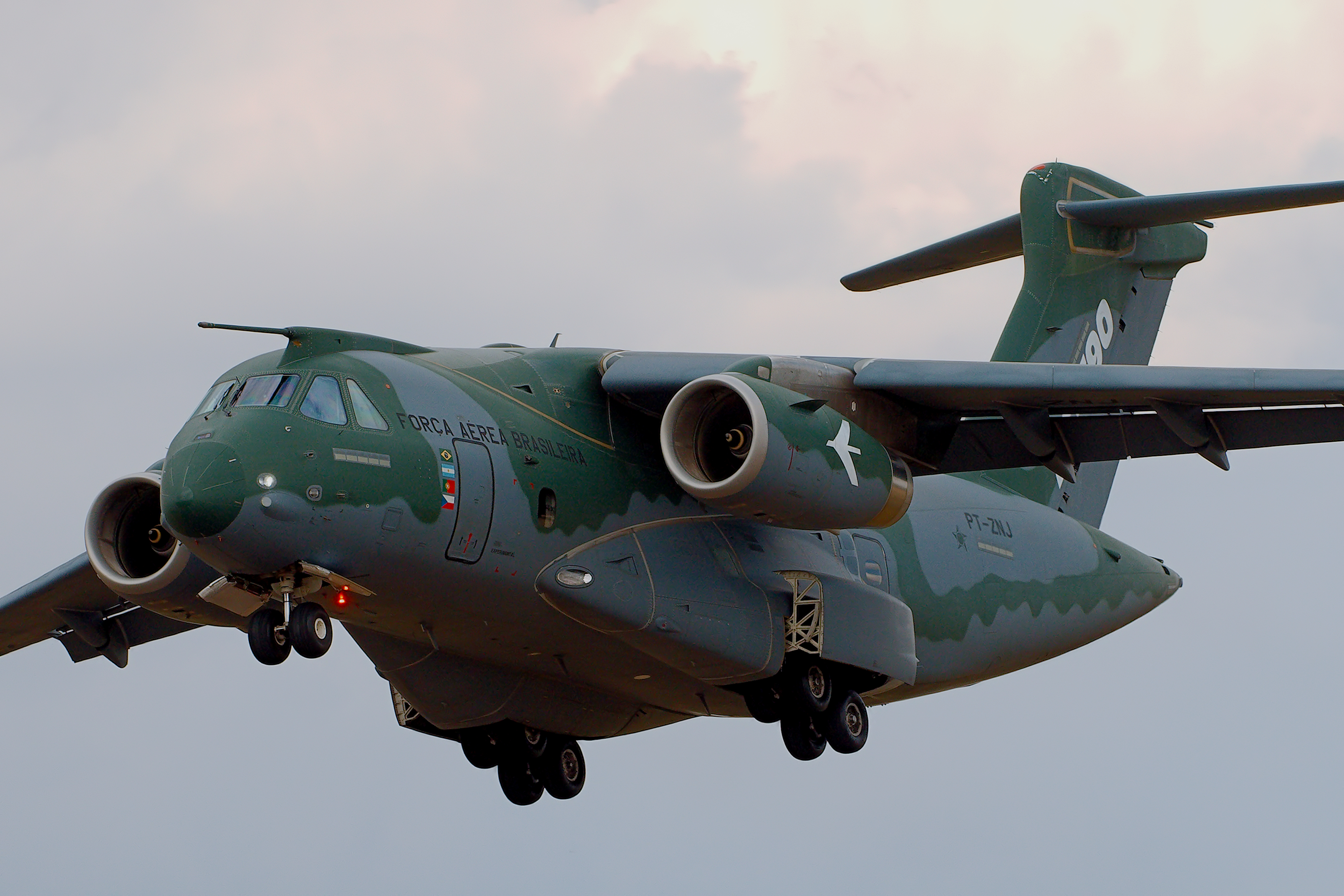
The Embraer KC-390 received its Brazilian civil type certification on 23 October 2018

Cypriot airline Cobalt Air ceases operations and cancels all flights.
23 October
After 1,900 flight hours, the Embraer KC-390 received its Brazilian civil type certification, the first production aircraft will be delivered to the Brazilian Air Force in the first half 2019 and it should reach its military certification by the end of 2019.
25 October
Belgium selects 34 Lockheed Martin F-35A valued at $6.53 billion to replace its fleet of 52 F-16s averaging 31.2 years, defeating the Dassault Rafale and Eurofighter Typhoon, after the Saab Gripen NG and the Boeing F/A-18 E/F were withdrawn.
29 October
Lion Air Flight 610, a Boeing 737 MAX 8, crashed into the Java Sea just after takeoff from Jakarta Soekarno–Hatta Airport killing all 189 aboard.

=== November ===
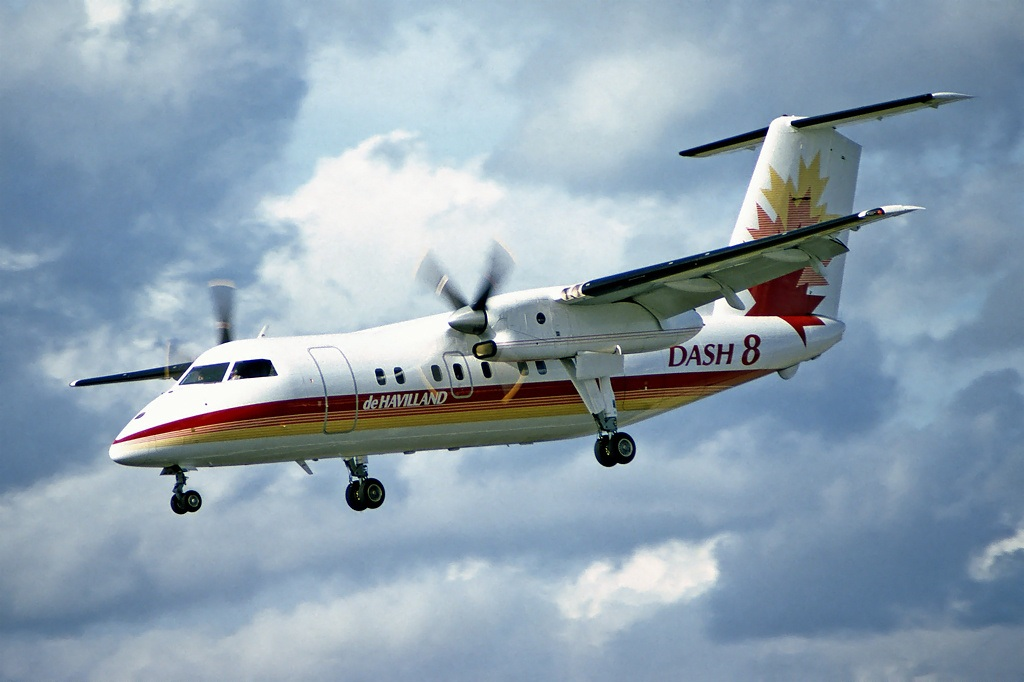
On 8 November, Viking Air parent acquires the Dash 8 from Bombardier

5 November
Icelandair Group announces a purchase agreement to acquire all shares of low-cost competitor WOW Air, subject to shareholder agreement.
6 November
The shorter -800 variant of the A330neo makes its maiden flight. The 4h 4min flight inaugurated a 350h test program aiming for a mid-2019 type certification and a first half of 2020 delivery to launch operator Kuwait Airways.
Airshow China is held 6–11 November in Zhuhai.
7 November
Following the crash of Lion Air Flight 610, the United States Federal Aviation Administration (FAA) issues an Emergency Airworthiness Directive for the Boeing 737 MAX 8 and MAX 9 aircraft types.
A Boeing 747-400F, operating Sky Lease Cargo Flight 4854, overran the runway on landing at Nova Scotia airport, damaging the aircraft beyond repair and resulting in injuries for the crew. The accident was attributed to pilot fatigue.
8 November
Viking Air parent Longview Aviation Capital Corp. acquires the Dash 8 from Bombardier
Fly Jamaica Airways Flight 256, a Boeing 757-23N registered as N524AT, suffered a runway excursion. Out of the 128 occupants onboard, 127 survive whereas 1 dies. The aircraft was written-off.
11 November
Air Astana Flight 1388 from Lisbon Alverca Airport loses flight control during takeoff. After one and a half hours in the air, the pilots manage to regain some control and make an emergency landing at Beja Airport.
21 November
First electroaerodynamic thrust ion plane test flight at MIT using ionic wind.
22 November
Italian manufacturer Piaggio Aerospace requests to be placed into receivership after declaring itself insolvent as its restructuring plan failed, less than a year after its owner, Abu Dhabi investor Mubadala, injected €255 million ($308 million) and repurchased its bank debt, as the P.180 Avanti deliveries fell to four in 2018 from 30 in 2008.
26 November
Leased from Avolon, the first Airbus A330neo-900 is delivered to TAP Air Portugal, featuring 298 seats: 34 full-flat business, 96 economy plus and 168 economy seats, and to be deployed from Portugal to the Americas and Africa.
United Technologies announces the completion of its Rockwell Collins acquisition, renaming systems supplier UTC Aerospace Systems as Collins Aerospace, for $23 billion of combined sales in 2017 and 70,000 employees.
27 November
The Ilyushin Il-112 first prototype is rolled out at the Voronezh Aircraft Production Association before the military transport aircraft maiden flight.
28 November
The Indonesian NTSC releases its preliminary accident investigation report on Lion Air Flight 610.
29 November
Icelandair abandons its plan to take over low cost carrier WOW Air, as the shareholders' meeting pre-conditions were unlikely to be met.
Bill Franke-managed private equity firm and low-cost carrier investor Indigo Partners reaches a preliminary agreement to buy WOW Air.
30 November
A 7.0 magnitude earthquake temporarily disrupts flight operations at Anchorage Airport in Alaska.

=== December ===
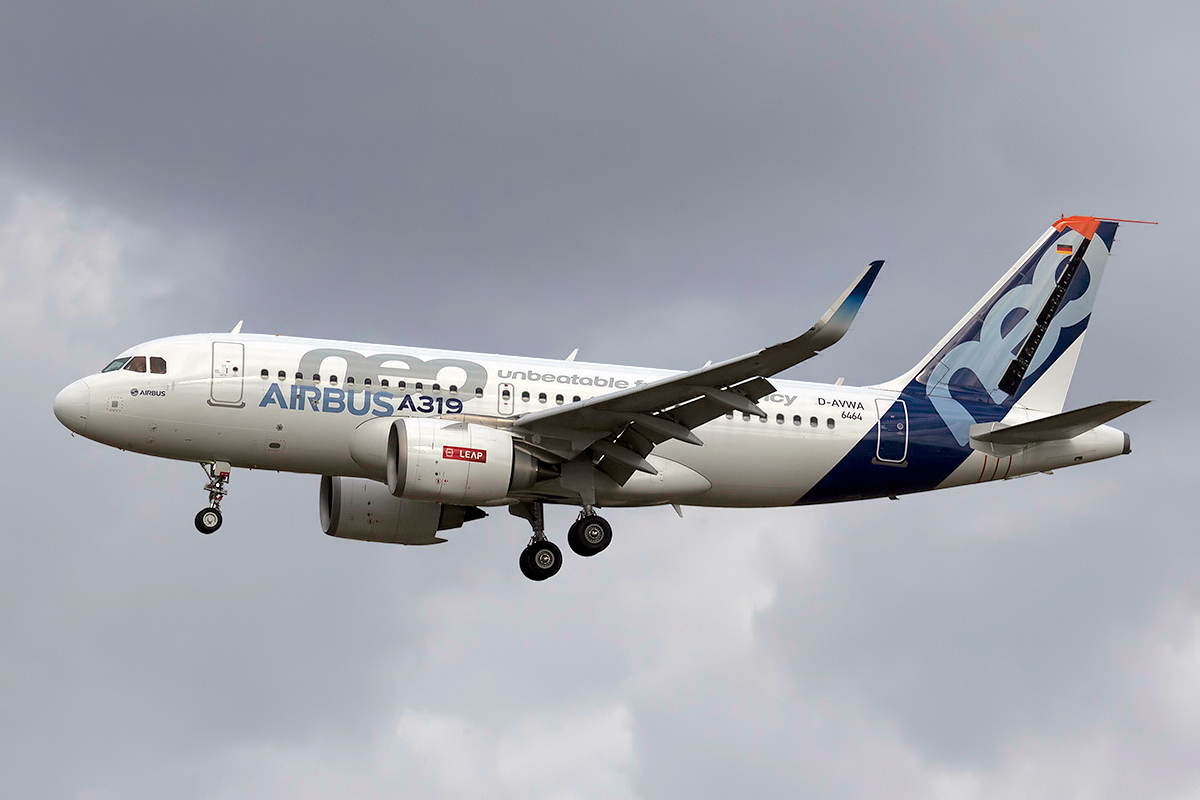
The CFM Leap powered Airbus A319neo was certified by the EASA/FAA on 21 December

5 December
Swiss business jet and wet lease operator PrivatAir files for insolvency and ceases operations, as well as its German subsidiary.
The airline alliance Oneworld announces that Royal Air Maroc will become a new member in 2020, the first African airline in the alliance.
6 December
At the demand of four congressmen of the left-wing Brazilian Workers Party, a Brazilian federal court forbids the regional plane-maker's board of directors to form the Boeing-Embraer joint venture, as that would give away for free the profitable airliner division and would remove it from the Brazilian government control.
10 December
Avianca Brazil files for bankruptcy protection as three lessors wants to get back 30% of its 50 aircraft fleet, R$100 million ($26 million) are owed to airports and bank debt grew by 50% in 2018, while United Airlines extended a loan of $456 million to Avianca owner Synergy Group.
MEBAA is held 10–12 December in Dubai.
14 December
Air Berlin's insolvency administrator sues its former owner Etihad for 0.5 to 2 billion euros of damages caused by withdrawing its funding before the promised 18 months from April 2017.
15 December
The first Boeing 737 is delivered, a MAX 8, to Air China, from the new Chinese completion center in Zhoushan, 20 months after construction of the 666,000 sq ft (61,900 m^{2}) facility began in a joint venture with COMAC, as one third of 737 deliveries are going to Chinese customers and China should become the largest airliner market.
17 December
A strategic partnership was announced for the Boeing-Embraer joint venture for airliners, subject to multiple approvals, while another joint venture to market the KC-390 will be owned for 51% by Embraer and 49% by Boeing, and will also need similar authorizations.
18 December
VLM Airlines Brussels files for bankruptcy.
Aircraft maintenance provider StandardAero is purchased by asset management company The Carlyle Group from Veritas Capital for $5 billion, the deal should close in the first quarter of 2019.
SkyWest, Inc. sells Atlanta-based ExpressJet Airlines to KAir Enterprises-United Airlines joint venture ManaAir for $70 million, the transaction is expected to close in early 2019. A Continental Airlines subsidiary before 2002 and purchased by SkyWest in 2010, ExpressJet lost $302 million in 2016, $32.5 million in 2017, and $0.23 million in the third quarter of 2018. With 128 aircraft (105 Embraer ERJ-145s, 14 Bombardier CRJ700s and nine CRJ100/200s) ExpressJet operates regional services for United, and American Airlines until April 2019. Utah-based SkyWest will retain the CRJs, but will lease 20 CRJ200s to ExpressJet, which will operate 25 United-owned, 70-seat Embraer 175s.
Brazilian plane maker Embraer delivered the 1500th E-Jet, an E175, to Horizon Air, a subsidiary of Alaska Airlines.
20 December
The Tecnam P2012 Traveller receives its European type certification, while the US approval is expected to follow shortly.
After 4,050 hours in 1,650 test flights, the Cessna Citation Longitude receives a provisional FAA type certification, allowing deliveries in early 2019.
After being delivered in early December, the Bombardier Global 7500 enters service with 100 secured orders.
21 December
The Airbus A319neo with CFM Leap-1A engines received a joint type certificate from the EASA (European Aviation Safety Agency) and the FAA (Federal Aviation Administration).

== Safety review ==
The EASA reported 530 fatalities in 11 fatal accidents worldwide in 2018 for commercial air transport with large aircraft, up from 67 fatalities in 9 accidents in 2017. The Aviation Safety Network reported 556 fatalities in 15 accidents of commercial aircraft for at least 14 passengers or their cargo variants, excluding military aircraft. The IATA reported an accident rate of 1.35 per million flights, improving from 1.79 for the previous 5-year period, and 0.19 for jets, down from 0.29, with 11 fatal accidents with 523 fatalities for 4.3 billion passengers on 46.1 million flights.

== First Flights ==
- 31 January
  - Airbus A³ Vahana N301VX
  - Airbus A321LR D-AVZO
- 16 March
  - Boeing 737 MAX-7 N7201S
- 10 April
  - Bye Aerospace Sun Flyer 2 N502SF
- 19 July
  - Airbus BelugaXL F-WBXL
- 6 September
  - TAI T625 TC-HLP
- 6 November
  - Airbus A330neo-800 F-WTTO

== First deliveries ==
- 7 February: Pilatus PC-24 N124AF
- 27 September: Gulfstream G500 A7-CGP

== Entered Service ==
- 24 February: Airbus A350-1000 A7-ANA
- 3 April: Boeing 787-10 9V-SCB
- 24 April: Embraer E190-E2 PR-EFL
- 20 December : Bombardier Global 7500 OE-IIL

== Deadliest crash ==
The deadliest crash of this year was a military accident, namely the 2018 Algerian Air Force Ilyushin Il-76 crash, which crashed near Boufarik, Algeria on 11 April, killing all 257 people on board. The deadliest civil aviation crash of the year was Lion Air Flight 610, a Boeing 737 MAX 8 which crashed shortly after takeoff from Jakarta, Indonesia on 29 October, killing all 189 people on board.
