= Bob Lamson =

Bob Lamson may refer to:

- Bob Lamson, inventor of Lamson L-106 Alcor
- Bob Lamson, a character in two episodes of The Walking Dead (season 5)
