= Einar Enevoldson =

American test pilot (1932–2021)

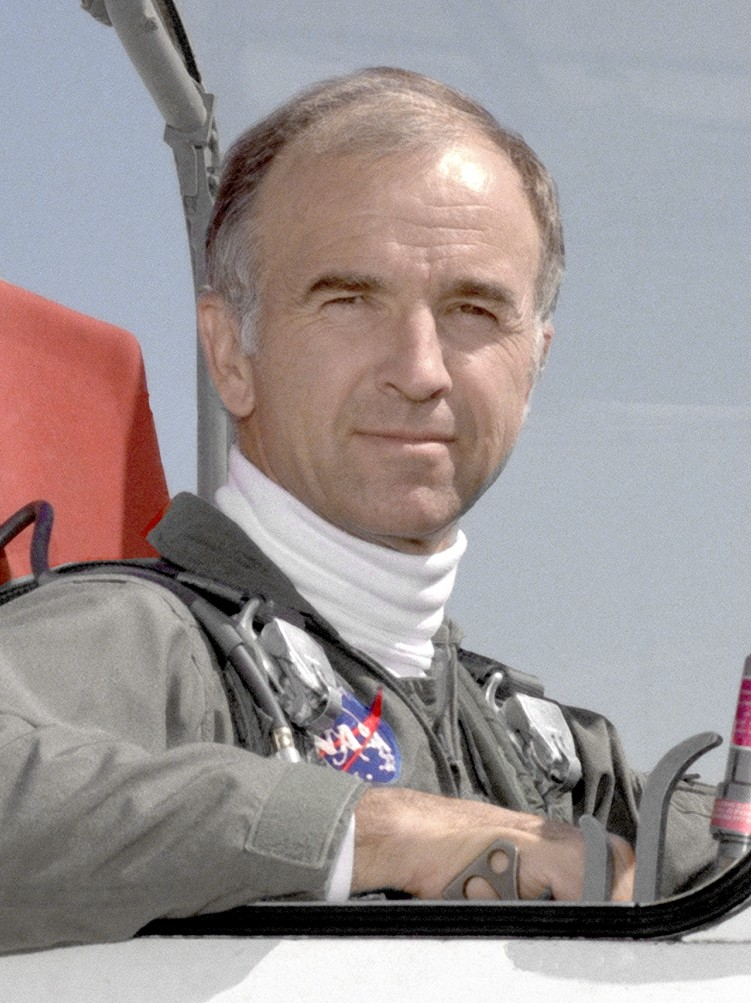
Einar Enevoldson

Einar K. Enevoldson (June 15, 1932, in Seattle, Washington – April 14, 2021) was the director of the Perlan Project. He was a civilian research pilot for NASA's Hugh L. Dryden Flight Research Center, Edwards, California, from 1968 until 1986. He was involved in many research programs, including those with experimental wings, propulsion and digital computer flight control systems.

== Career ==
Enevoldson attended several colleges. He received his B.S. degree in Mechanical Engineering and his M.S. degree in Aeronautical Engineering from the University of Wyoming in 1963.

He was a jet fighter pilot in the United States Air Force (USAF), and as an exchange officer with the Royal Air Force attended the Empire Test Pilot's School in Farnborough, Hampshire, England. Following graduation, he served at Boscombe Down as a test pilot on the Hawker Hunter, English Electric Lightning, and Gloster Javelin British fighter aircraft from 1966 to 1967.

Enevoldson was awarded the USAF Distinguished Flying Cross in 1959 for his record flights in a Lockheed F-104 Starfighter. In 1974 he was awarded the NASA Exceptional Service Medal, for his contributions as NASA Project Pilot on the F-111 Supercritical Wing Program and on the F-15 Remotely Piloted Research Vehicle. In 1980 he was awarded a second NASA Exceptional Service Medal for contributions as project pilot on F-14 stall and spin resistance tests.

In 1986 he retired from NASA and accepted a full-time position as the chief test pilot for the Grob Egrett in Mindelheim, West Germany in 1988. The Egrett was a high-altitude reconnaissance aircraft for the German Air Force. Enevoldson set the absolute altitude record for all turboprop aircraft in the prototype Egrett in 1988, as well as time-to-climb. With the fall of the Berlin Wall in 1989 the requirement for the Egrett diminished, and the project was cancelled after six aircraft had been built.

Subsequently, he was the test pilot for the Grob Strato 2C. This was an extremely advanced, all carbon, very high altitude, propeller driven aircraft, built to carry two pilots, two scientists, and 2,000 pounds (910 kg) of scientific instruments to an altitude of 80,000 feet (24,000 m) for 8 hours, or to 60,000 feet (18,000 m) for 60 hours. On its 29th and final flight, Enevoldson reached an altitude of over 60,700 feet (18,500 m), which exceeded the official altitude record for all propeller-driven aircraft by over 5,000 feet (1,500 m). The German Aerospace Center (DLR) cancelled the project due to the cost of proposed final modifications necessary to make the aircraft mission-ready.

Among the NASA aircraft that Enevoldson flew were the F-111, F-14, F-8 Digital Fly-By-Wire and Supercritical Wing, YF-12A, the oblique wing AD-1, Controlled Deep Stall Sailplane, sub-scale F-15 remotely piloted spin research vehicle and the X-24B lifting body.

Among the pressure suits in which he flew are the US MC-4, US A/P22S-6, US S-1000, US 1030/1034, UK pressure jerkin with Taylor helmet, the Russian KK0-15, the US copy of the UK pressure jerkin with P-mask.

Enevoldson said that he had never intended to specialize in high altitude testing, but over a long career he probably accumulated more diverse experience there than anyone. He flew above 50,000 feet (15,000 m) in 14 different types of jet aircraft, one turboprop (record altitude), one reciprocating engine (5,000 feet (1,500 m) above record altitude), one sailplane (record altitude), and one rocket aircraft (glide flights). He also held several time-to-climb records in the F-104 (3, 6, 9, 12, 15, 20, 25 km — which have since been broken). He may also hold the record for longest time between record flights — 48 years.

== Perlan Project ==
While working in Germany with the DLR he developed the meteorological basis for the Perlan Project. The theory, briefly, posits that the coincidence of the stratospheric polar night jet and the polar jet stream, when occurring over a mountain barrier, creates the necessary conditions for the amplification of standing mountain waves through the tropopause, in accordance with the Eliassen-Palm theorem. Enevoldson initiated a search for funding for the project. When balloonist and adventurer Steve Fossett heard about it from his friend Barron Hilton, Fossett enthusiastically joined the project as its sponsor. Using NASA and USAF full pressure suits Fossett and Enevoldson set the world sailplane absolute altitude record of 50,724 feet (15,461 meters), flying from El Calafate in the south of Argentine Patagonia, above the Andes Mountains in the wind field of the stratospheric polar night jet.

Enevoldson was chosen to be the pilot for the Perlan II follow-up project aircraft.

== Bibliography ==
- Ryan, Bertha M. (2010) "Soaring Beyond the Clouds: Einar Enevoldson Reaches for 100,000 Feet" Soaring Society of America ISBN 0615402259, 9780615402253
