= Lamson L-106 Alcor =

American research glider

L-106 Alcor
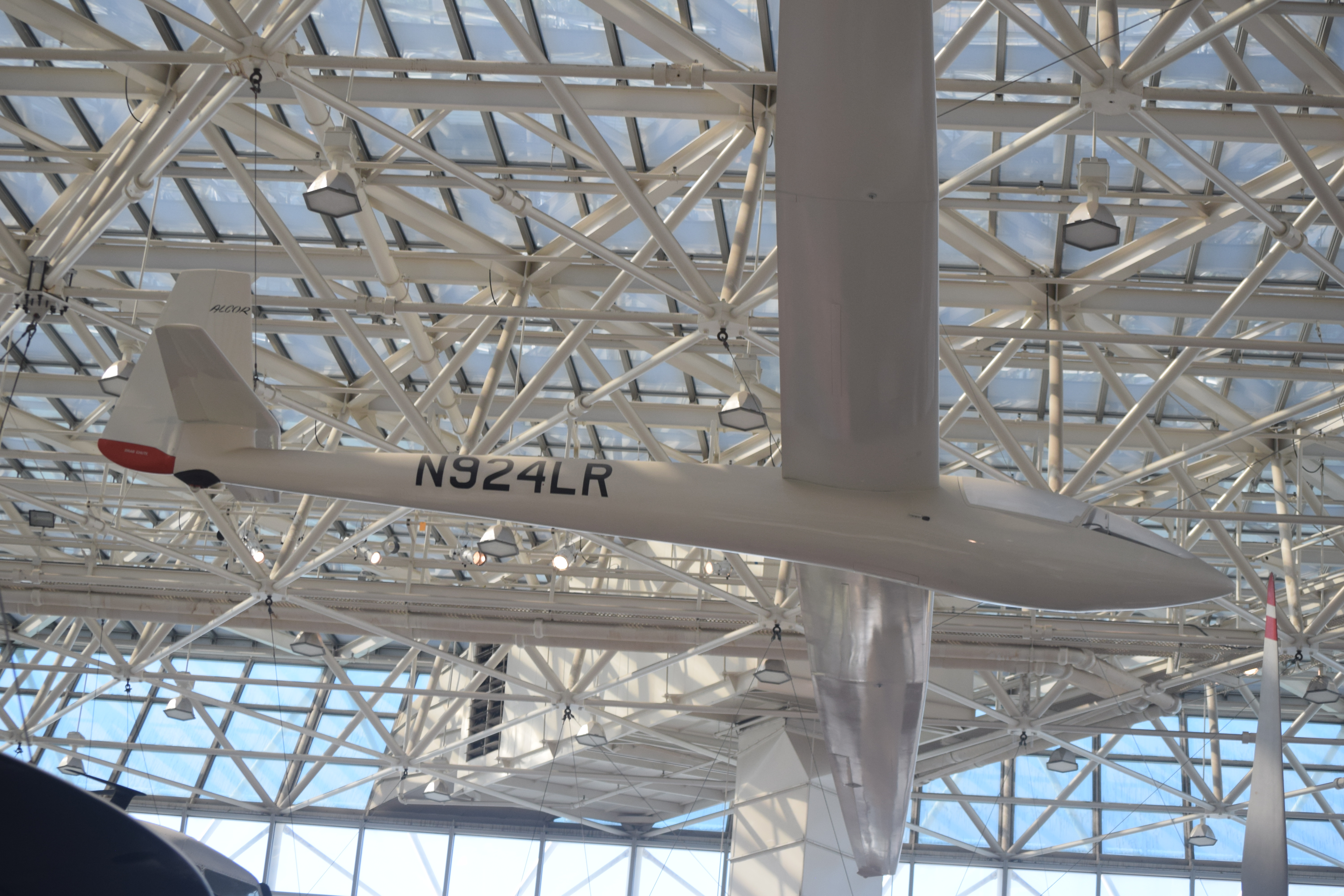
- At the Museum of Flight

General information
- Type: Glider
- National origin: United States
- Designer: Bob Lamson
- Status: Sole example preserved in the Museum of Flight
- Primary user: Bob Lamson
- Number built: One

History
- Introduction date: 1972
- First flight: 1973

The Lamson L-106 Alcor is an American, high-wing, experimental, pressurized research glider that was designed and built by Bob Lamson. The Alcor was the first pressurized sailplane ever built.

== Design and development ==
The Alcor was conceived during the 1960s as a high altitude research aircraft by Lamson. He had served in the US Army Air Corps and also worked for the Boeing Aircraft Company as a test pilot. While at Boeing during the 1940s, he worked on high-altitude oxygen systems, which led him to investigate aircraft pressurization. He attended the University of Washington.

The Alcor is named for the star in Ursa Major and was optimized for flight in weak mountain wave soaring conditions. The aircraft is constructed from Sitka spruce veneer, covered with layers of fiberglass. The wings and tail use foam sandwiches, covered in S-glass. The Alcor was one of the first gliders to be built from composites.

The Alcor's 65.6 ft (19.99 m) span wing employs a Feifel airfoil. The pressurization system provides two to three inches of Mercury pressure differential. The cockpit also incorporates a solar heater to keep the canopy clear of ice condensation at high altitude and also provide pilot warmth.

== Operational history ==
The Alcor was registered with the Federal Aviation Administration as completed in 1968, but reportedly first flew in 1973. In 1983 Lamson indicated that the aircraft has flown 180 hours and had exceeded 20,000 ft (6,096 m) "four or five times".

Between 1985 and 1989, the aircraft was used in southern Alberta, Canada as a research aircraft for a study of the chinook arch, proving ideal for this sort of high-altitude work.

In 1992 the aircraft was transferred to the Museum of Flight in Seattle, Washington, where it is on display.

== Aircraft on display ==
- Museum of Flight - sole example

== Specifications (Alcor) ==
Data from Sailplane Directory and Soaring

General characteristics

- Crew: One
- Length: 25 ft (7.6 m)
- Wingspan: 65.6 ft 7 in (20.17 m)
- Wing area: 154 sq ft (14.3 m^{2})
- Aspect ratio: 28:1
- Airfoil: Feifel
- Empty weight: 550 lb (249 kg)
- Gross weight: 950 lb (431 kg)

Performance

- Never exceed speed: 139.97 mph (225.26 km/h, 121.63 kn)
- Maximum glide ratio: 43:1 at 55 mph (89 km/h)
- Rate of sink: 90 ft/min (0.46 m/s) at 50 mph (80 km/h)

== See also ==
Aircraft of comparable role, configuration, and era

- Windward Performance Perlan II

Related lists

- List of gliders
