= Christian Scherer =

German/French Business executive

- Born: 1962 (age 63–64); Duisburg, Germany
- Education: University of Ottawa; Ecole Supérieure de Commerce de Paris
- Occupation: Business executive
- Known for: Former Chief Executive Officer of the Commercial Aircraft business at Airbus

Christian Scherer (born in 1962) is a German-French business executive. He was the chief executive officer of the commercial aircraft business of Airbus.

== Early life ==
Born in Duisburg, Germany, and raised in Toulouse, France, he holds an MBA in international marketing from the University of Ottawa and graduated from the Ecole Supérieure de Commerce de Paris.

== Career ==
He started his career in 1984 at Airbus where he was Head of Contracts, Leasing Markets and Deputy Head of Sales as well as Head of Strategy and Future Programmes. He moved to Airbus Defence and Space in 2012 and headed Marketing & Sales there until 2015.

In October 2016, he was appointed CEO of ATR. Schrerer returned to Airbus to replace Eric Schulz as Airbus' Chief Commercial Officer (CCO) on 13 September 2018.

In January 2024, he became chief executive officer of the commercial aircraft business of Airbus. On 30 October 2024, Airbus announced that Scherer would be replaced by Lars Wagner, who was previously the CEO of MTU Aero Engines, starting in 2026.
