= Perlan Project =

American high altitude research organization

The Perlan Project, Inc.
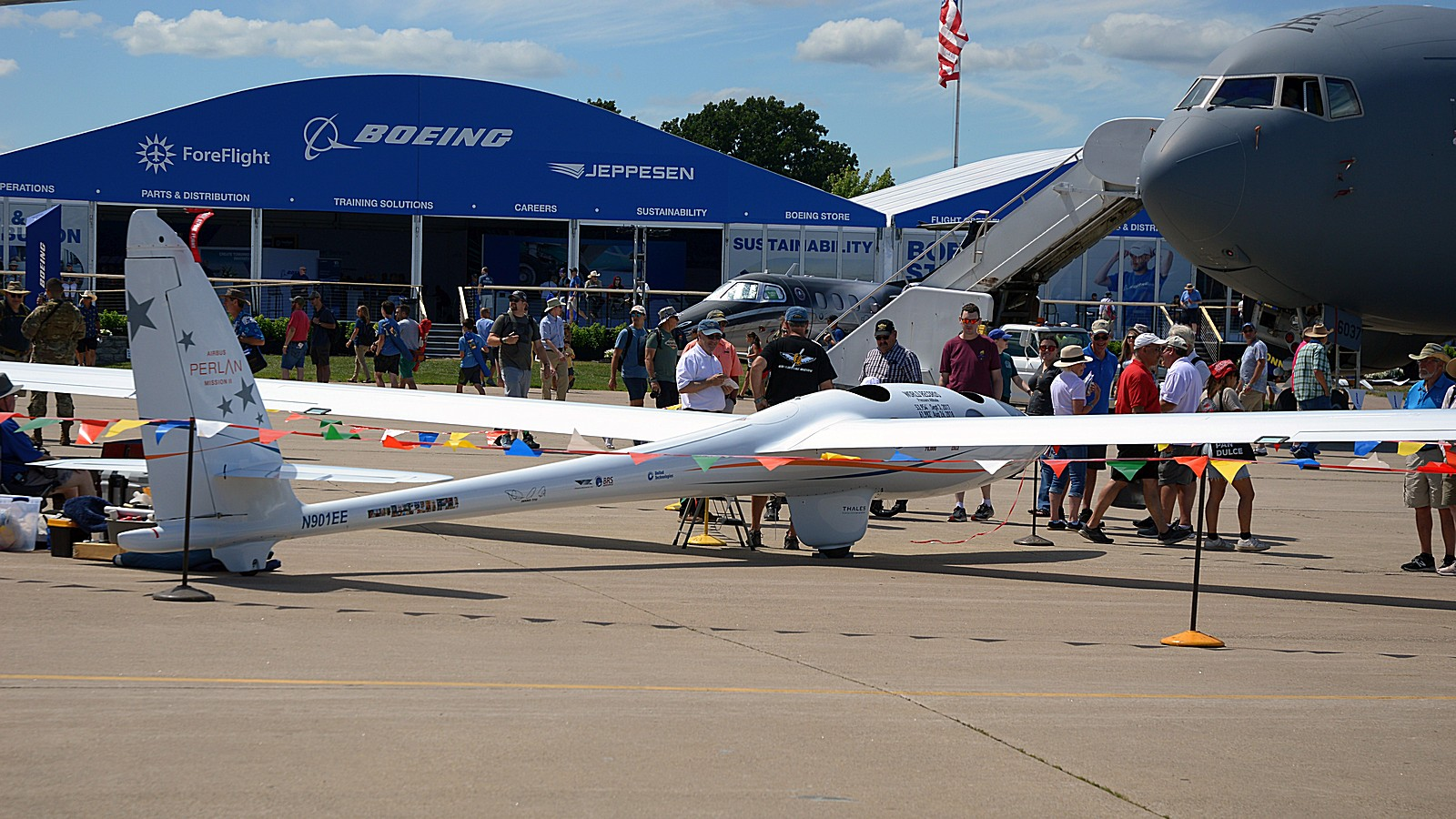
- Perlan II
- Type: Non-operating private foundation IRS 501(c)(3)
- Founded: 1992
- Founder: Einar Enevoldson
- Number of locations: Beaverton, Oregon, USA
- Area served: Global
- Key people: Einar Enevoldson, Founder and chairman Elizabeth Austin, Chief Meteorologist; Ed Warnock, CEO; Jim Payne,Chief Pilot; Morgan Sandercock, Donor and Project Manager; Dennis Tito, Major Donor; Stéphane Fymat, Head of Build and Fundraising
- Products: Aerospace and Atmospheric Science Research, Development, Innovation and Education
- Website: www.perlanproject.org

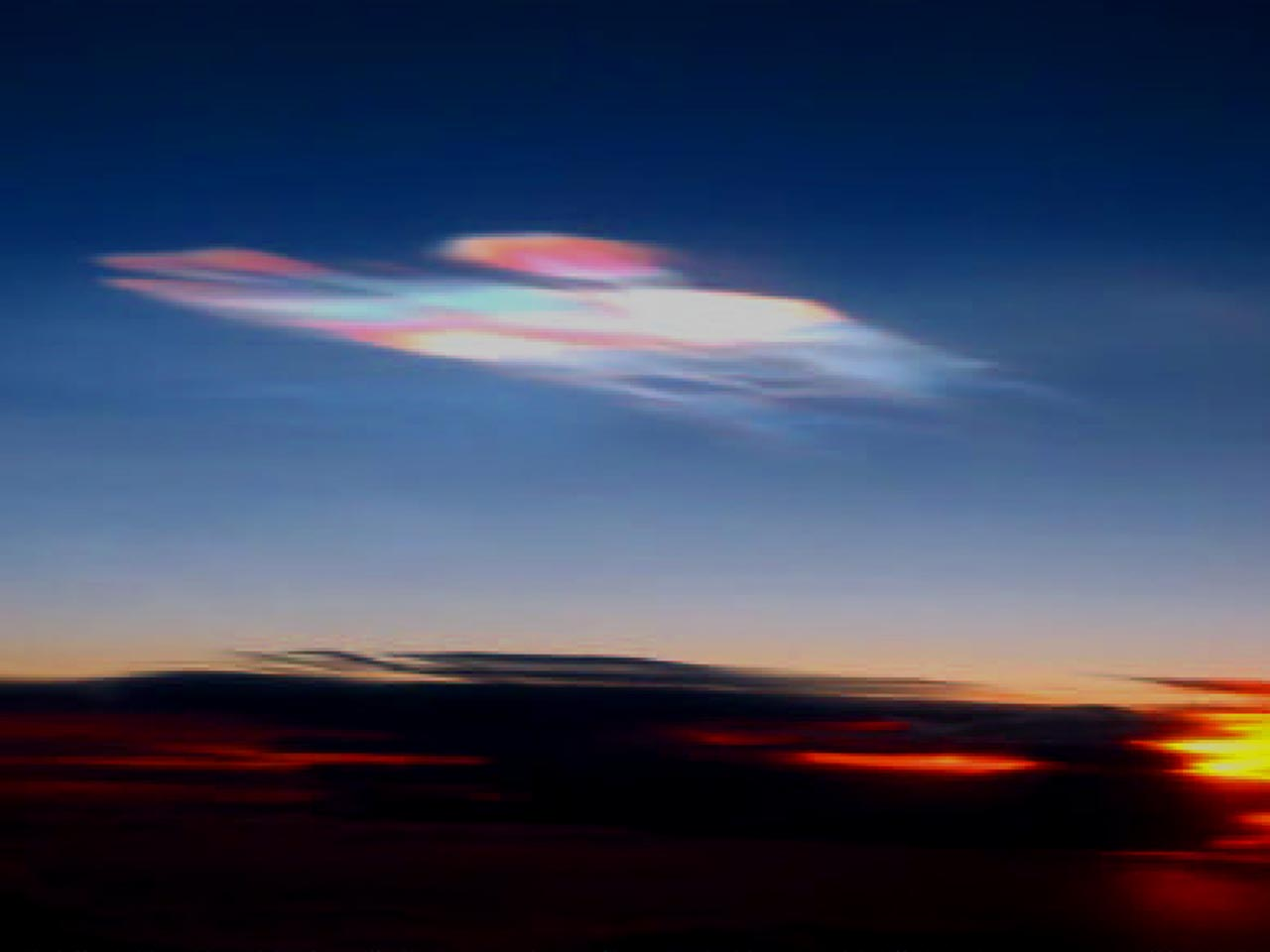
Arctic stratospheric cloud (Mother of Pearl cloud)

Perlan Project Inc. is a not-for-profit aeronautical exploration and atmospheric science research organization that utilizes sailplanes (gliders) designed to fly at extremely high altitudes.

On 29 August 2006 Steve Fossett and Einar Enevoldson, the pilots of Perlan Mission I, broke the existing altitude record for gliders by soaring up to 50,671 feet (15,460m) in a standard glider using stratospheric waves of air.

The Fédération Aéronautique Internationale has ratified the altitude record of 22,657 metres (74,334 ft) achieved on 2 September 2018, a substantial improvement over the previous year's best altitude of 15,902 metres (52,172 ft), which was set on 3 September 2017. These flights used the custom designed and built pressurized high-altitude Windward Performance Perlan II glider, sponsored by Airbus. They also collected data about Earth's atmosphere and its ozone layer.

== Meteorological basis of the missions ==
Standing mountain waves are a source of rising air used in the sport of soaring. Riding these waves, similar in some ways to surfing on an ocean wave, has been widely used to reach great altitudes in sailplanes since they were discovered by German glider pilots, including Wolf Hirth, in 1933 in the Riesengebirge. This method uses the powerfully rising and sinking air in mountain waves. Gliders regularly climb in these waves to high altitudes.

Prior to the 4 September 2017 flight, the glider absolute world altitude record stood at 15,460 meters (50,727 feet), which is the altitude reached by Steve Fossett and Einar Enevoldson during Perlan Mission I. The previous record was 14,938 meters (49,009 feet). It was set in 1986 by Robert R. Harris, flying from California City and reaching his record height over Mount Whitney, California. This may be near the limit for standing mountain waves in temperate latitudes, although in unusual meteorological conditions much higher altitudes may be achievable.

Standing waves normally do not extend above the tropopause at temperate latitudes. A strong west wind usually decreases above the tropopause, which has been shown to cap or prevent the upward propagation of standing mountain waves. However, at the outer boundary of the polar vortex, in winter, the stratospheric polar night jet exists. Its wind field can join with the wind field of the polar jet stream. The result is a wind which increases with altitude through the tropopause and upward to 100,000 feet or above. When this conjunction of winds occurs over a barrier mountain, standing mountain waves will propagate through that entire altitude range. Einar Enevoldson, former NASA test pilot, sought to demonstrate the feasibility of riding these stratospheric standing mountain waves. The weather conditions favorable, although not in every case required to exist simultaneously for a climb into the stratospheric waves, are not exceptional. The following list of requirements for record attempts was given in an article published in 2014:

- Prefrontal conditions
- Ridge top winds ≥ 40 knots
- Winds within 30 degrees of perpendicular to ridgeline
- Strong low-level winds
- A stable atmosphere
- A gradual wind increase in altitude
- A weak tropopause

These conditions often occur during late winter and early spring over the southern Andes and Scandinavia.

These conditions are likely to occur in the southern region of Patagonia three to four times per year between mid-August and mid-October. They probably occur in New Zealand, but less frequently; over the Antarctic Peninsula more frequently; and at several locations in the northern hemisphere, but closer to the North Pole at latitudes above 60° north.

== Objectives ==
The overall objective of the project is to show that sailplane flight well into the middle stratosphere—in the vicinity of 90,000 feet—can be done safely, repeatedly and economically. A sailplane is an ideal platform for several scientific and technological research endeavors:

- A sailplane can maneuver precisely at very high altitudes to traverse or remain relatively stationary in a desired portion of the wave structure, as the structure is determined in flight.
- A sailplane can remain on station for several hours to record the evolution of the wave.
- A sailplane with modern, compact, low power instrumentation makes possible the recording of air mass motion precisely, as well as the collection of samples for later ground analysis or analysis in flight.
- A sailplane has high strength and great controllability. It is ideal for penetrating breaking waves to determine the turbulence structure and ensuing flight dynamics.
- A sailplane at 90,000 feet altitude flies in approximately the same aerodynamic regime—Mach and Reynolds numbers—to be experienced by a moderate size aircraft flying near the surface of Mars.
- A sailplane may carry aerodynamic instrumentation to measure the boundary layer behavior in this regime better than can be done in any wind tunnel.

== History ==
Einar Enevoldson conceived the project in 1992, after seeing the new LIDAR images of standing mountain waves west of Kiruna, Sweden, that Wolfgang Renger of the DLR, Oberpfaffenhofen, Germany had posted on his office wall. Enevoldson collected evidence on the location, prevalence, and strength of stratospheric mountain waves during the period 1992-1998. Starting in 1998 Elizabeth Austin expanded the data analysis and put the project on a firm meteorological basis, with the observation that the stratospheric polar night jet was the principal factor enabling the propagation of standing mountain waves high into the middle stratosphere. At this time a small group at the NASA Dryden Flight Research Center analysed the flight dynamics and aerodynamics of sailplane flight up to 100,000 feet.

In 1999, Steve Fossett heard that Enevoldson was trying to find funding, and immediately asked to join the project. United States Air Force, on the basis of NASA request, loaned the project full pressure suits. A Glaser-Dirks DG-500 (DG 505M) motorized glider was modified to remove all engine and related equipment and the space used for storage of liquid oxygen and a large supply of Li-SO_{2} primary batteries. Most of the instruments and electronics were replaced with equipment suitable for the extreme altitudes that the sailplane would encounter. Duncan Cummings, of San Pedro, California, built special, lightweight, efficient, reliable faceplate heat controllers. Butler Parachute Company built special high altitude stabilized parachutes.

Enevoldson and Fossett flew the sailplane from California City for shakedown and preliminary high altitude flights in the Sierra Nevadas of California, reaching over 42,000 feet in Spring 2002. In Summer 2002, the sailplane was shipped to Omarama, New Zealand, where it flew during three winters without reaching the stratosphere. The timing was too early in the season.

Perlan Mission I was designed to prove Enevoldson's thesis by actually flying into and climbing these stratospheric mountain waves. In 2005, the sailplane was shipped to El Calafate, Argentina, a small town at 50° south latitude. Five attempts in a three-week period, none in favorable weather conditions, were unsuccessful. In 2006, the forecast offered very favorable conditions on 28 August but at 33,000 feet, in a strong climb, Steve Fossett's pressure suit inflated prematurely and excessively, and the flight was aborted. The next day, on 29 August, after one of the pressure suit regulators had been changed, the weather conditions were still favorable, the team made another attempt. After a four-hour climb, Enevoldson and Fossett reached the record altitude of 50,671 feet (15,460m), validating the concept.

Because the record flight of 29 August 2006 proved Enevoldson's thesis, Steve Fossett agreed to fund, progressively, the next mission: to build a special purpose sailplane with a pressurized cabin to fly to 90,000 feet. At the time of Steve's death on 3 September 2007, the structural and aerodynamic design of the fuselage had been completed, along with the aerodynamic design of the entire sailplane. Funding for the remainder of the Perlan Project was lost with Steve's death, and a search for new funding was begun.

== Airbus Perlan Mission II ==
After Fossett's death in 2007, it appeared for a time that the mission was on permanent hiatus. However, a new team gradually reassembled around Enevoldson and partial funding was secured thanks to commitments from partners in the United States and Australia. Einar Enevoldson reported in September 2008, that Morgan Sandercock, an experienced sailplane pilot from Australia, had provided funds to restart the project. This funding was put to completing the fuselage with pressure cabin and do the structural tests on it, but additional funds were needed to complete the aircraft.

In June 2010, Dennis Tito joined the mission as a pilot and major funder, which enabled significant progress towards the completion of the aircraft. That same year Jim Payne, holder of numerous world soaring records, joined the project as chief pilot.

A great deal of design work has been done by Greg Cole of Windward Performance to show that a sailplane for 90,000 feet is relatively straightforward, while 100,000 feet is possible, although more difficult and expensive. Windward Performance would build the sailplane of high performance pre-preg in production-quality tooling. The sailplane required relatively high-end design, analysis, and construction to be flutter-safe at very high true air speeds, and strong enough for the potentially heavy turbulence that could be encountered at 90,000 feet. It must also have well-proven, fail-safe pressurization and cabin air re-cycling systems.

In 2014, Airbus agreed to become the title sponsor, and provide sufficient funding for completion of the aircraft, flight testing and the altitude flights. The mission was renamed the Airbus Perlan Mission II. RDD Enterprises, an aviation research, design and development company based in Redmond, Oregon, took over the manufacture of the Perlan 2.

=== Flight campaigns ===
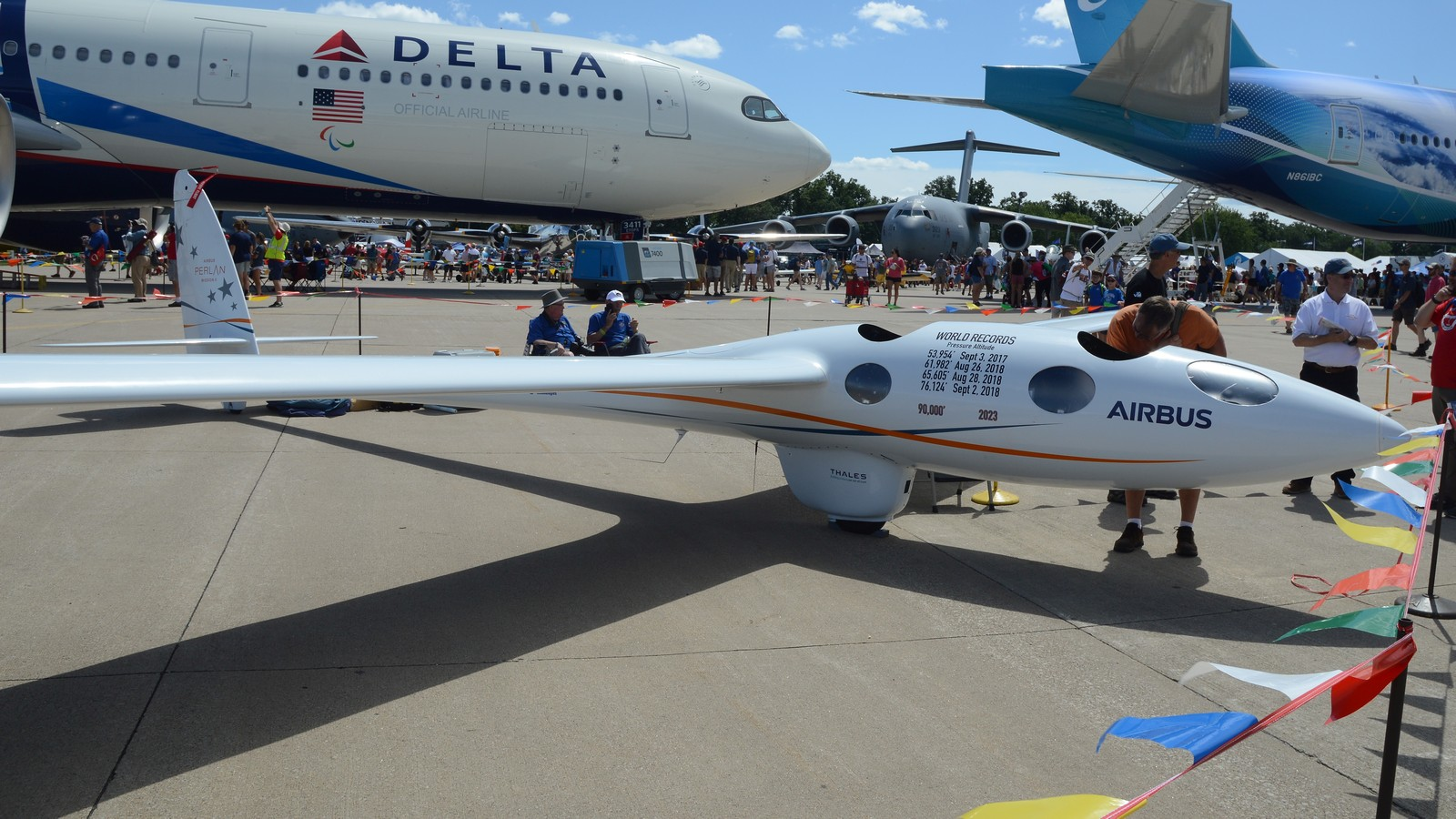
Perlan II N901EE at EAA AirVenture Oshkosh in 2022

The aircraft was completed in the summer of 2015, with first flight scheduled for 7 September. Windy conditions that day prevented the flight, which finally occurred on 23 September. Flight testing started in Minden, NV in fall and winter of 2015, using a new hangar donated by Tito. The first attempts to reach 90,000 feet will be launched from El Calafate, Argentina, deep in the south of Patagonia, in the Southern Hemisphere soon afterwards in summer of 2016.

Jim Payne (USA) and Morgan Sandercock (Australia) set a new altitude record of 15,902 metres (52,172 feet) from Comandante Armando Tola International Airport in El Calafate, Argentina. The flight took place on 3 September 2017.

The 2018 season was again based at El Calafate. The project acquired a Grob G 520 Egrett turboprop aircraft for use as a tow plane. This enabled Perlan II to be towed to 44,000 ft (13,411 m) This seems to be the highest glider tow, although such records are not registered.

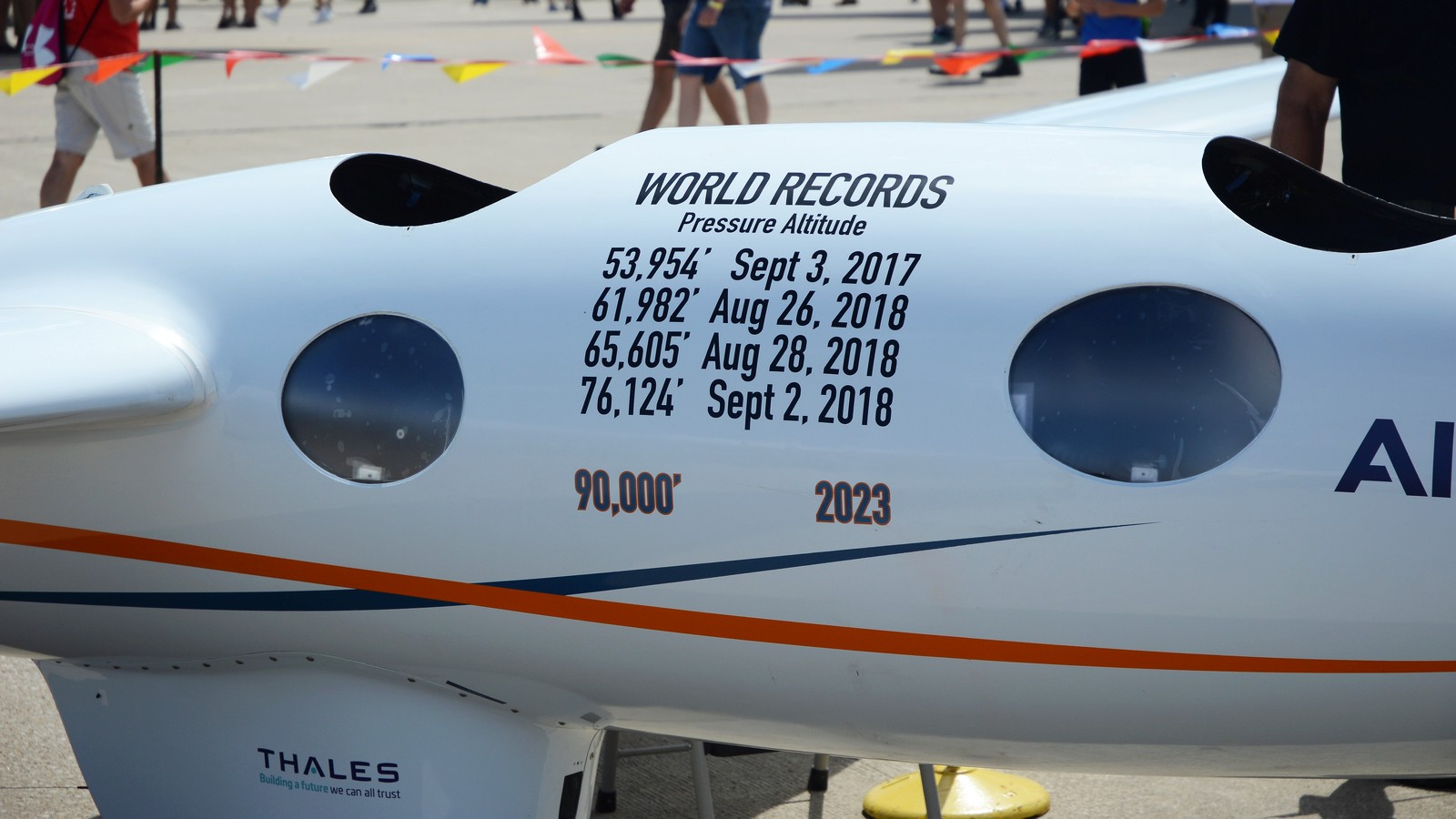
Perlan II's list of actual and hoped-for records as of 2022

On 26 August 2018 Jim Payne and Morgan Sandercock reached an altitude of 18,492 m (60,669 ft). This was followed by 19,439 m (63,776 ft) with Jim Payne and Miguel Iturmendi on 28 August 2018. On 2 September 2018, Jim Payne and Tim Gardner reached an altitude of 22,657 m (74,334 ft), surpassing the 73,737 ft (22,475 m) attained by Jerry Hoyt on 17 April 1989 in a Lockheed U-2: the highest manned, heavier-than-air, subsonic flight. The Perlan 2 could fly to 90,000 ft (27,000 m) if conditions allow, higher than the manned level flight altitude record of the SR-71 Blackbird at 85,069 ft (25,929 m). Previous records were measured with pressure altitude; high altitude soaring records now require GPS data.
