= Windward Performance Perlan II =

American research glider

Perlan 2
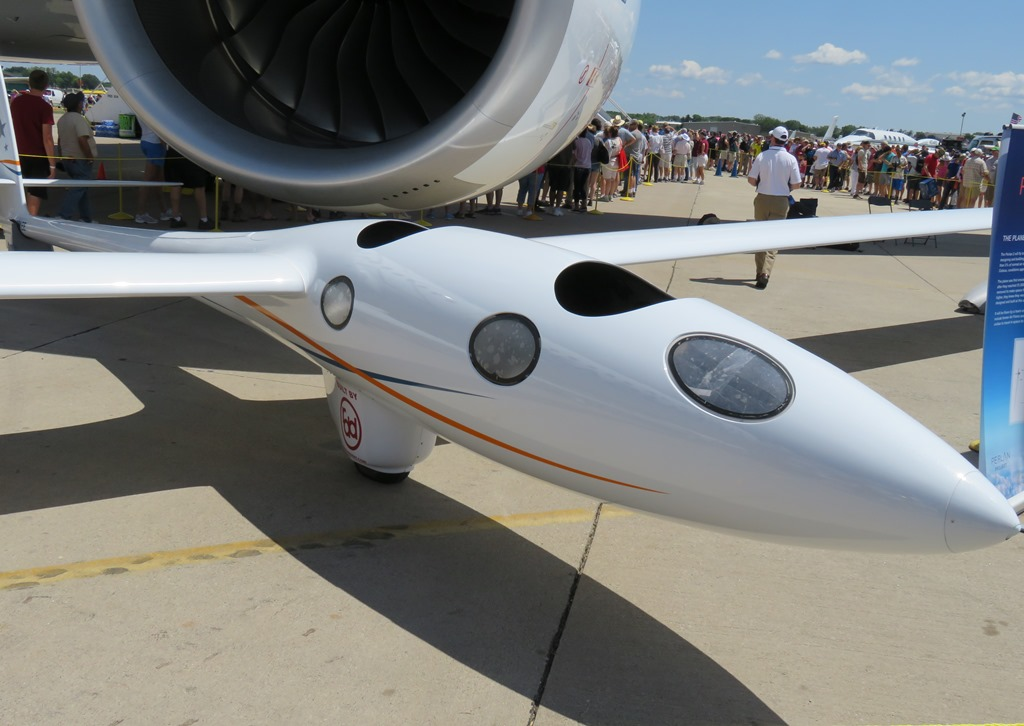
- Perlan 2 on display with an Airbus A350 XWB for scale in background

General information
- Type: Glider
- National origin: United States
- Manufacturer: Windward Performance
- Designer: Greg Cole
- Status: Under development
- Primary user: Perlan Project

History
- First flight: 23 September 2015

The Windward Performance Perlan 2 (English: Pearl) is an American mid-wing, two-seats-in-tandem, pressurized, experimental research glider that was designed by Greg Cole and built by Windward Performance for the Perlan Project. The aircraft first flew on 23 September 2015 at Redmond Municipal Airport, Oregon.

== Design and development ==
The Perlan 2 is a follow-up design to the successful Perlan 1. Its design goal is to reach and exceed 90,000 ft (27 km) in altitude. The project's goals include science, engineering and education. The aircraft will be used to study the northern polar vortex and its influence on global weather patterns. It has already surpassed the sub-sonic altitude record set in 1989 by a Lockheed U-2. The program also hopes to beat the 85,069 ft altitude record set in 1975 by a Lockheed SR-71 Blackbird.

The aircraft is made from composites. Its 83.83 ft (25.55 m) span wing has a high aspect ratio of 27.1 and is equipped with airbrakes. The pressurization system produces an 8.5 psi differential, and the two-person crew will not wear pressure suits. The landing gear is a fixed monowheel gear. Because the aircraft will operate at extreme altitudes, in only 3% of sea level atmospheric pressure, it will also be flying at true airspeeds in excess of 0.5 Mach. The aircraft was designed to minimize flutter and manage shock wave formation.

The original funding for the Perlan Project was provided by Steve Fossett and he flew the Perlan 1, along with test pilot Einar Enevoldson to a glider altitude record of 50,761 ft (15 km) in the mountain waves of El Calafate, Argentina on 30 August 2006. Fossett was killed in a light aircraft crash a year later and the project floundered without funding. Since then more than US$2.8M has been raised to build the Perlan 2, including a donation in 2010 from Dennis Tito. In November 2013, a crowd-funding effort was undertaken. In August 2014 Airbus became a partner in the project and the title sponsor.

The Perlan 2 first flew in 2015 and started with flights in the U.S. Sierra Nevada mountain wave. The record setting and research flights started in southern Argentina in 2016, by Einar Envoldson or Perrenod using rebreather oxygen systems. The aircraft was displayed at AirVenture in July 2015.

== World records ==
On 3 September 2017 Perlan 2, flown by Jim Payne and Morgan Sandercock, reached an altitude of 52,172 ft (15,902 m), establishing a new world record for gliders over the Andes Mountain range in Argentina.

On 2 September 2018, Jim Payne and Tim Gardner reached an altitude of 76,124 ft (23,203 m), surpassing the 73,737 ft (22,475 m) attained by Jerry Hoyt on April 17, 1989, in a Lockheed U-2: the highest subsonic flight.

=== Complete list of records ===
Date	Record type	Pressure altitude	Pilot	Crew
2017-09-03	Gliders - Absolute altitude	52,172 ft (15,902 m)	James M. Payne (USA)	Morgan Sandercock (USA)
2018-08-26	Gliders - Absolute altitude	61,882 ft (18,862 m)	James M. Payne (USA)	Morgan Sandercock (USA)
2018-08-28	Gliders - Absolute altitude	65,605 ft (19,996 m)	James M. Payne (USA)	Miguel A. Iturmendi Copado (USA)
2018-09-02	Gliders - Absolute altitude	22,657 m	James M. Payne (USA)	Timothy Gardner (USA)
2018-09-02	Subsonic wing-borne human flight	76,124 ft (23,203 m)	James M. Payne (USA)	Timothy Gardner (USA)

== Specifications (Perlan 2) ==
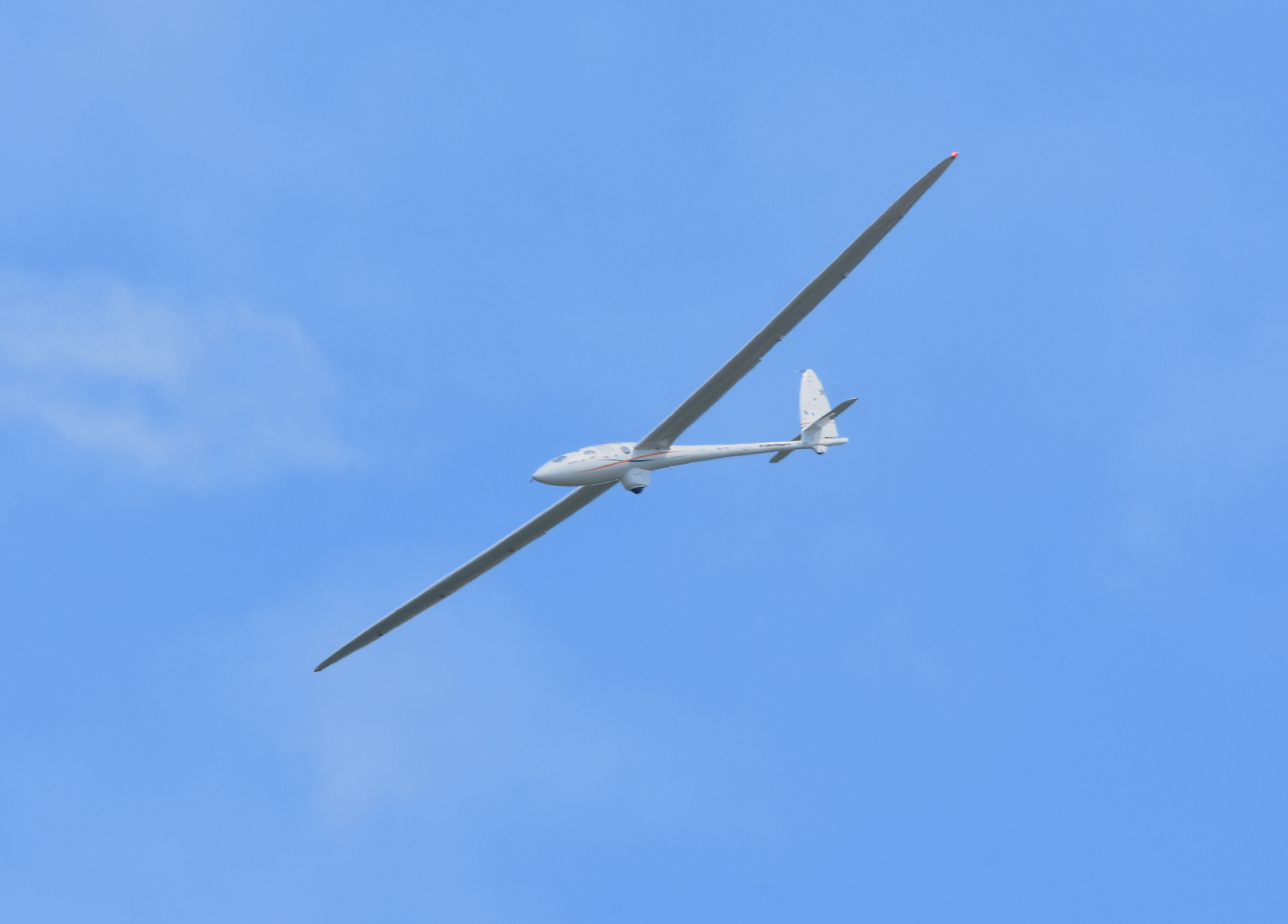
Perlan II in the air

Data from FreeFlight

General characteristics

- Crew: two
- Length: 33.33 ft (10.16 m)
- Wingspan: 83.83 ft (25.55 m)
- Height: 7.25 ft (2.21 m)
- Wing area: 263 sq ft (24.4 m^{2})
- Aspect ratio: 27.1
- Empty weight: 1,265 lb (574 kg)
- Gross weight: 1,800 lb (816 kg)

Performance

- Never exceed speed: 377 kn (434 mph, 698 km/h) true airspeed, 56 kn (104 km/h; 64 mph) indicated (0.633 Mach)
- Service ceiling: 90,000 ft (27,000 m)
- g limits: +6/-4
- Maximum glide ratio: 43

== See also ==
Aircraft of comparable role, configuration, and era

- Lamson L-106 Alcor

Related lists

- List of gliders
