= Business jet =

Jet-powered executive transport aircraft

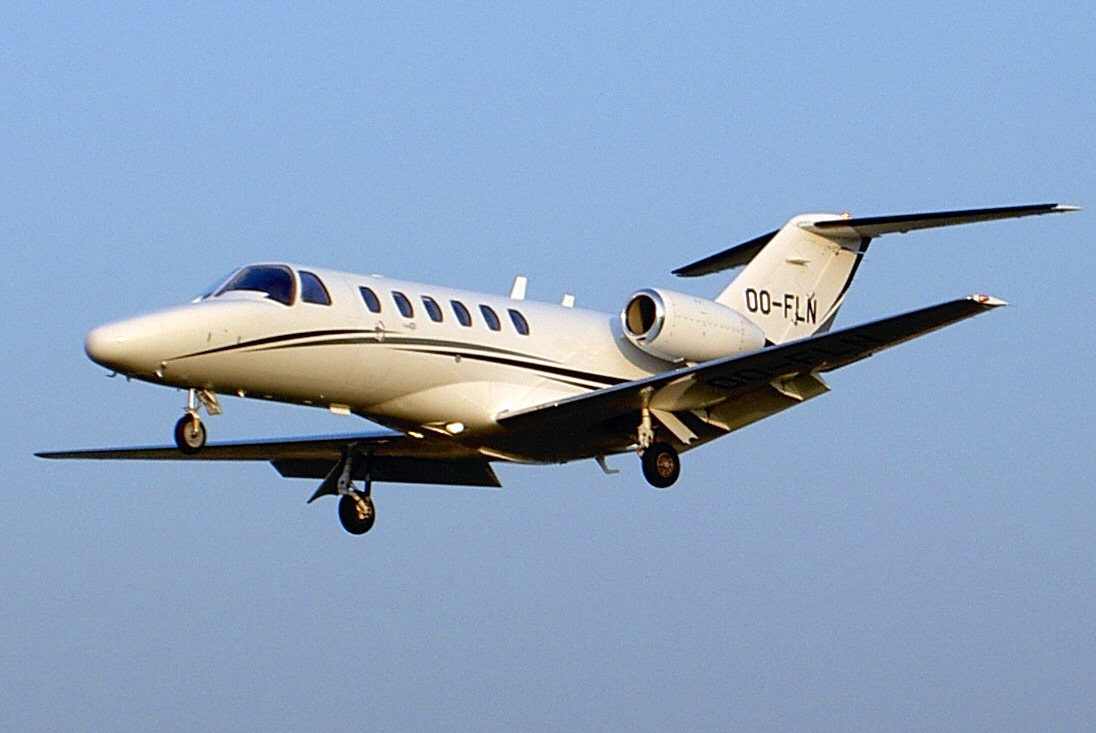
Over 2,000 Cessna CitationJets have been delivered, making it the most popular line of business jets.

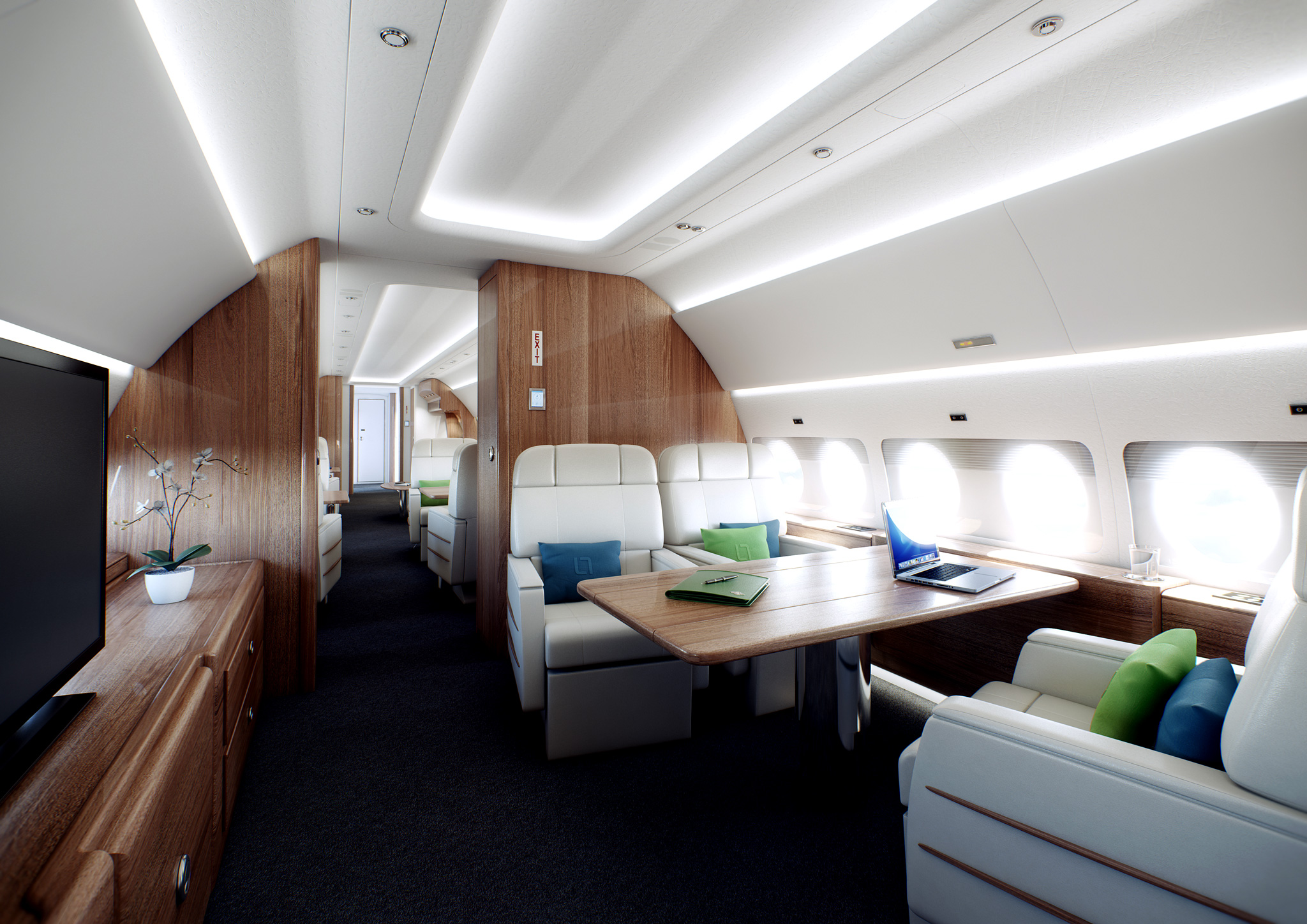
View of the cabin, inside a business jet

A business jet, private jet, or bizjet is a jet aircraft designed for transporting small groups of people, typically business executives and high-ranking associates. Business jets are generally designed for faster air travel and more personal comfort than commercial aircraft, and may be adapted for other roles, such as casualty evacuation or express parcel deliveries, and some are used by public bodies, government officials, VIPs, or even the military.

== History ==
=== Early developments ===
The first small, jet-powered civilian aircraft was the Morane-Saulnier MS.760 Paris, developed privately in the early 1950s from the MS.755 Fleuret two-seat jet trainer. First flown in 1954, the MS.760 Paris differs from subsequent business jets in having only four seats arranged in two rows without a center aisle, similar to a light aircraft, under a large sliding canopy similar to that of a fighter. A U.S. type certificate was awarded in July 1958, but commercial sales were limited, with most examples going to the military; an improved civilian version similar to a modern very light jet, with a six-seat enclosed cabin and a conventional door, never proceeded past the prototype stage. The commercial failure of the MS.760 Paris prompted the cancellation of projects by Cessna and Douglas Aircraft to market similar jets.

The development of center-aisle cabin business jets was accelerated by an August 1956 United States Air Force (USAF) letter of the requirement for two "off-the-shelf" aircraft, the larger UCX (cargo) and smaller UTX (trainer). These requirements differed from standard USAF procurement contracts in that no formal competitions would occur, and manufacturers were expected to develop the aircraft without government funds; despite this, a substantial USAF purchase would offset the large investment necessary to develop prototypes. Both Lockheed Corporation and McDonnell Aircraft began the development of UCX aircraft, while North American Aviation pursued the UTX requirement.

=== 1950s first flight ===
The Morane-Saulnier MS.760 Paris had a gross weight of 7,650 lb (3.47 t), initially powered by two Turboméca Marboré turbojets of 880 lbf (3.9 kN) thrust, although most aircraft were later upgraded to 1,058 lbf (4.71 kN) units. The aircraft seated a single pilot and up to three passengers under a sliding canopy, and was first flown on 29 July 1954; 219 were built.

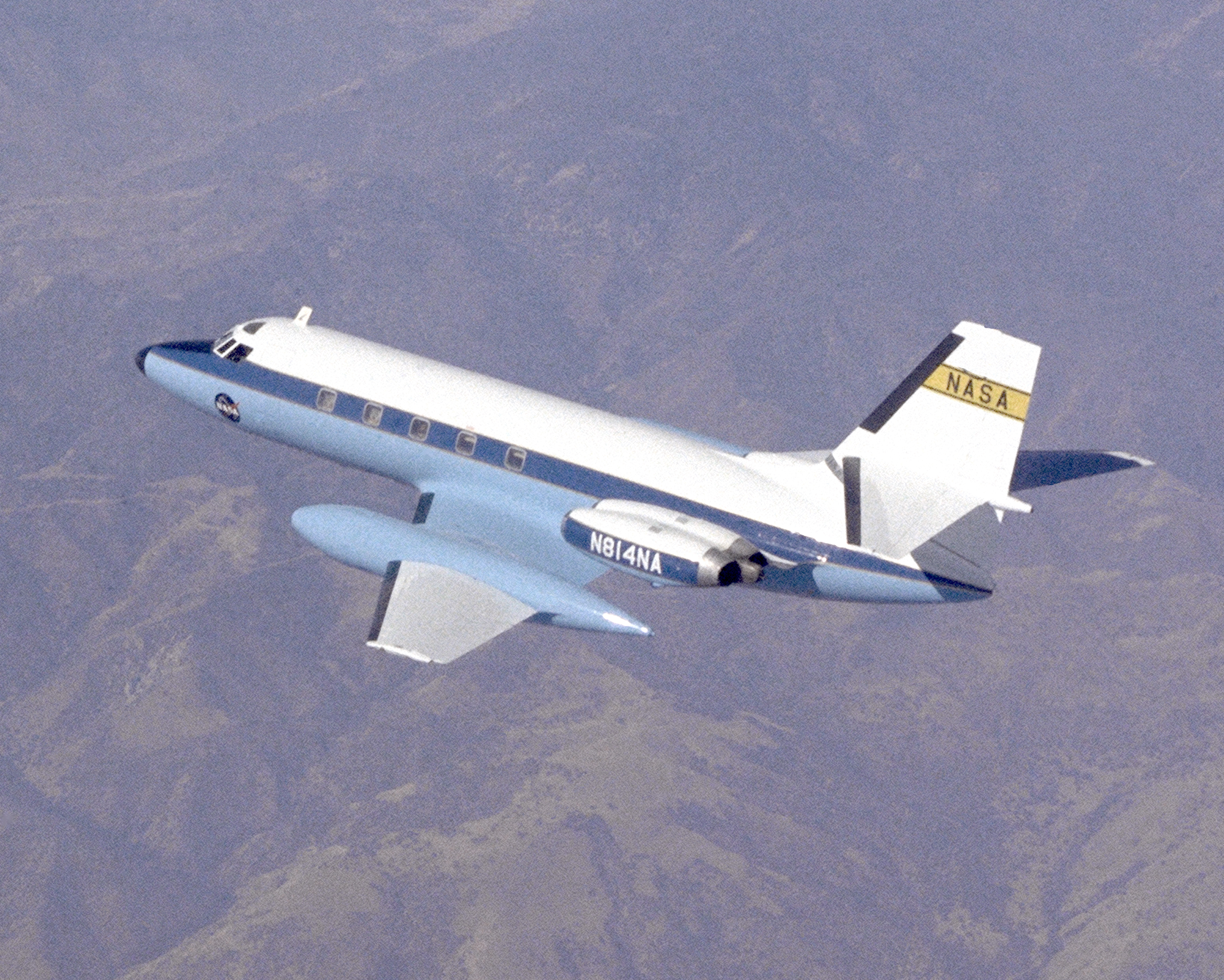
The Lockheed JetStar is the earliest business jet with a center aisle.

The Lockheed JetStar, designed to meet USAF UCX requirements and seating 10 passengers and 2 crew, first flew on 4 September 1957. In total, 204 aircraft were produced from 1957 to 1978 powered by several different engines; four 3,300 lbf (15 kN) Pratt & Whitney JT12 turbojets, then Garrett TFE731 turbofans for a 44,500 lb (20.2 t) maximum take-off weight (MTOW), then two General Electric CF700 turbofans.

The smaller, 17,760-pound (8.06 t) MTOW North American Sabreliner, tailored to the USAF UTX requirement, first flew on 16 September 1958. Powered by two Pratt & Whitney JT12 turbojet engines then Garrett TFE731s, more than 800 were produced from 1959 to 1982.

Designed in 1957 for the UCX requirement, the McDonnell 119 was delayed by the cancellation of the Fairchild J83 engine program, and first flew on 11 February 1959 powered by four Westinghouse J34 turbojets. The 119 was certified for a 45,328 lb (20.6 t) MTOW with four Pratt & Whitney JT12 or General Electric CF700 engines, but no firm orders were received, and only the single prototype was completed.

=== 1960s first flight ===
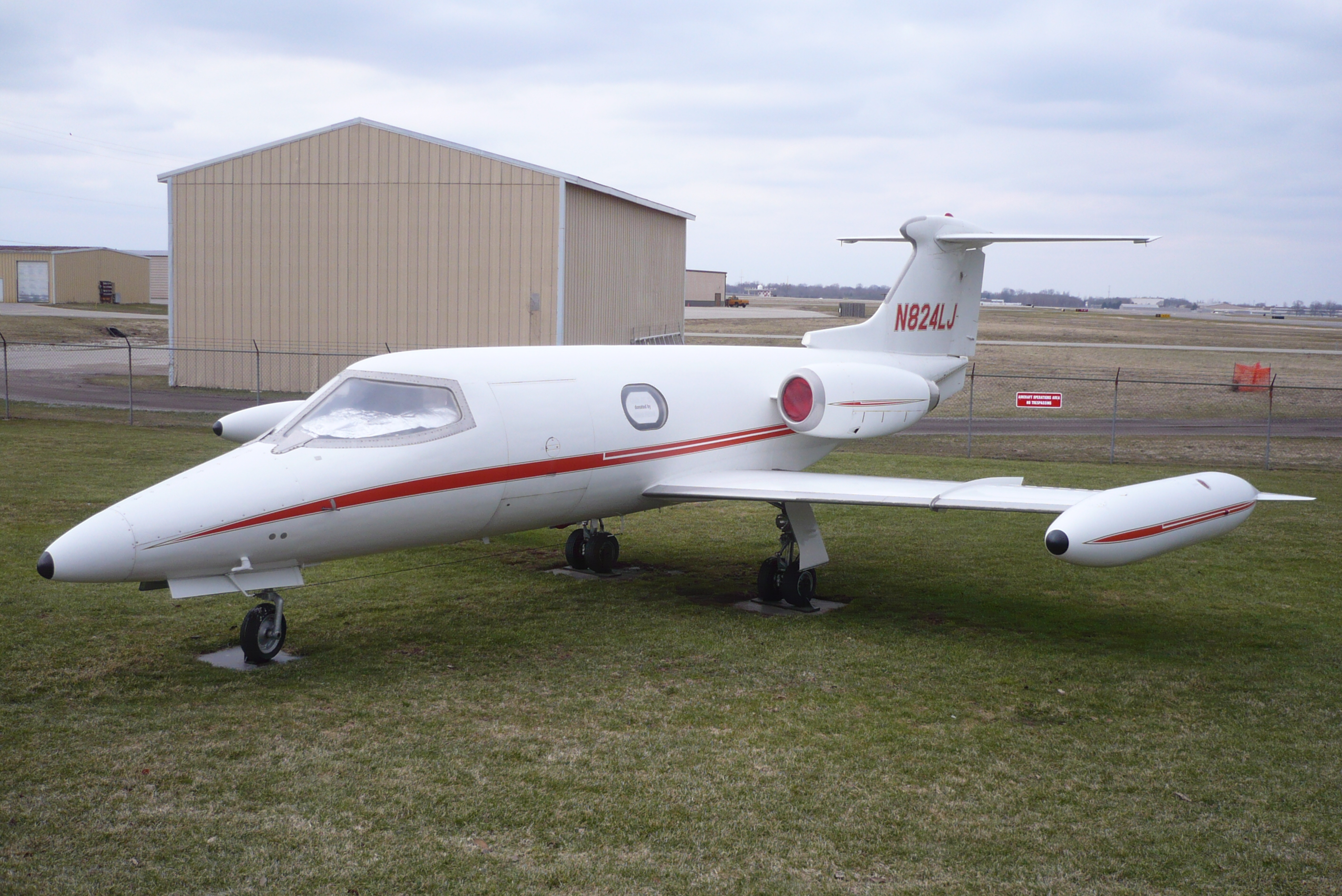
The 1963 Learjet 23 was the first light jet.

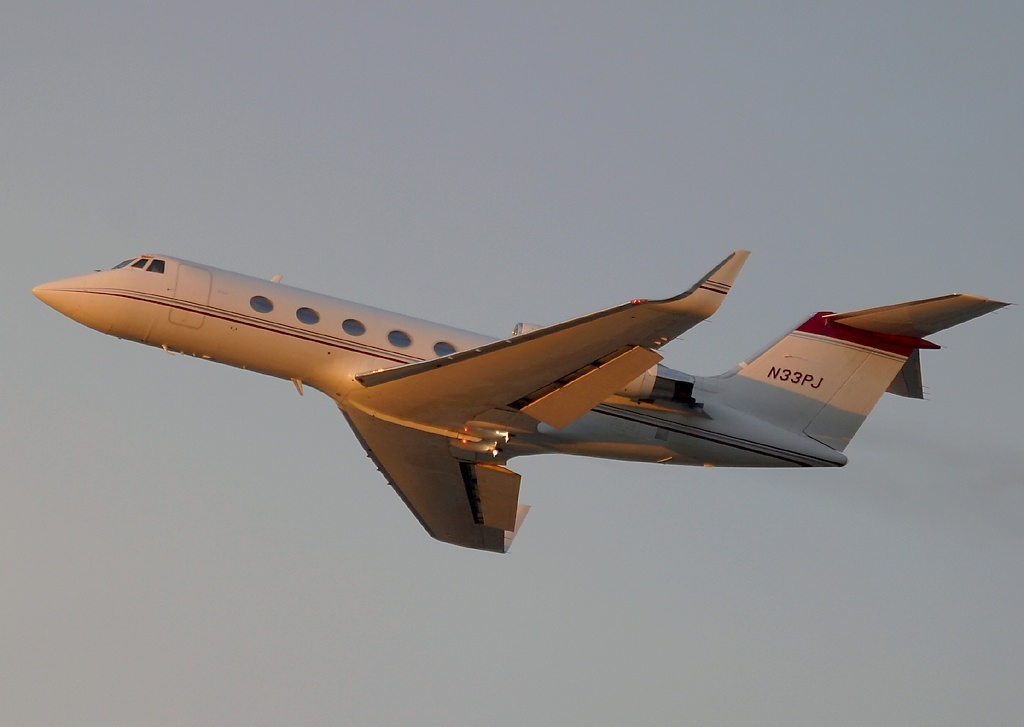
The first large, long-range jet was the Grumman Gulfstream II in 1966.

The 25,000 lb (11 t) MTOW British Aerospace 125 first flew on 13 August 1962 as the de Havilland DH.125, powered by two 3,000 lbf (13 kN) Armstrong Siddeley Viper turbojets. Its engines were replaced by Garrett TFE731s, then Pratt & Whitney Canada PW300 turbofans. Almost 1,700 aircraft of all variants, including the Hawker 800, were produced between 1962 and 2013.

The Aero Commander 1121 Jet Commander, which later became the IAI Westwind, first flew on 27 January 1963, powered by two General Electric CJ610 turbojets, then Garrett TFE731s. Production of Jet Commanders and Westwinds from 1965 to 1987 came to 442 aircraft, and it was developed as the IAI Astra, later rebranded as the Gulfstream G100.

The 29,000 lb (13 t) MTOW Dassault Falcon 20 first flew on 4 May 1963, powered by two General Electric CF700s, then Garrett ATF3 turbofans and Garrett TFE731s. In total, 508 were built from 1963 to 1988, and it is the basis of the Dassault Falcon family.

The first light jet first flew on 7 October 1963 - the Learjet 23. Powered by two 2,850 lbf (12.7 kN) General Electric CJ610s, its 12,500 lb (5.7 t) MTOW complies with FAR Part 23 regulations. The first member of the Learjet family, 104 were built between 1962 and 1966.

The forward wing-sweep, 20,280 lb (9.20 t) MTOW Hamburger Flugzeugbau HFB 320 Hansa Jet first flew on 21 April 1964, powered by two General Electric CJ610s; 47 were built between 1965 and 1973. The joint Piaggo-Douglas, 18,000 lb (8.2 t) MTOW Piaggio PD.808 first flew on 29 August 1964, powered by two Armstrong Siddeley Vipers; 24 were built for the Italian Air Force.

On 2 October 1966 the first large business jet first flew, the 65,500 lb (29.7 t) MTOW Grumman Gulfstream II, powered by two 11,400 lbf (51 kN) Rolls-Royce Spey turbofans. From 1967 to the late 1970s, 258 were built, and it led to the ongoing Gulfstream Aerospace long-range family.

The 11,850 lb (5.38 t) MTOW Cessna Citation I first flew on 15 September 1969, powered by two 2,200 lbf (9.8 kN) Pratt & Whitney Canada JT15D turbofans. Produced between 1969 and 1985, for a total of 689 examples, it is the first of the Cessna Citation family.

=== 1970s first flight ===
The trijet Dassault Falcon 50 made its first flight on 7 November 1976. The 40,000 lb (18 t) MTOW airplane is powered by three 3,700 lbf (16 kN) TFE731 engines. With the cross-section of the Falcon 20, it is the basis of the larger Falcon 900.

On 8 November 1978, the prototype Canadair Challenger took off. The 43,000–48,000 lb (20–22 t) MTOW craft, usually powered by two 9,200 lbf (41 kN) General Electric CF34s, formed the basis of the long range Bombardier Global Express family and of the Bombardier CRJ regional airliners. The 1000th Challenger entered service in 2015.

On 30 May 1979 the all-new 22,000 lb (10.0 t) MTOW Cessna Citation III took off for the first time, powered by two 3,650 lbf (16.2 kN) TFE731s.

The Mitsubishi MU-300 Diamond made its first flight on 29 August 1978. The 16,100 lb (7.3 t) MTOW jet was powered by two 2,900 lbf (13 kN) JT15D. The design was later sold and was renamed Beechjet 400 then Hawker 400, with a total of 950 produced of all variants.

=== 1980s first flight ===
The 1980s only saw the introduction of derivatives and no major new designs. The late 1980s saw the advent of fractional ownership for business jets. For much of the 1980s, sales of new aircraft slumped.

=== 1990s first flight ===
On 29 April 1991, the Cessna CitationJet was first flown. Powered by two 1,900 lbf (8.5 kN) Williams FJ44 engines, the 10,500 lb (4.8 t) light jet used a modified Citation II fuselage with a new wing and tail, and was subsequently developed into the CJ series and M2, ultimately replacing the Citation I, Citation II and Citation V series. The 2,000th CitationJet was delivered in 2017.

The first flight of the all-new Learjet 45 was on 7 October 1995. All of the 642 aircraft built since then have been powered by two 3,500 lbf (16 kN) TFE731 engines.

Powered by two 2,300 lbf (10 kN) Williams FJ44s, the 12,500 pounds (5.7 t) Beechcraft Premier I light jet made its first flight on 22 December 1998. Nearly 300 had been made before production stopped in 2013.

=== 2000s first flight ===
In the opposite way compared to Bombardier, which developed airliners from a business jet, Embraer derived the Legacy 600 from the Embraer ERJ family of regional jet airliners. Powered by two 8,800 lbf (39.2 kN) Rolls-Royce AE 3007s, the first flight of the 50,000-pound (22.5 t) aircraft was on 31 March 2001. M

On 14 August 2001, the Bombardier Challenger 300 made its first flight. The 38,850-pound (17.62 t) aircraft is powered by two 6,825 lbf (30.36 kN) HTF7000s. The 500th example was delivered in 2015.

The first very light jet, the 5,950-pound (2.70 t) MTOW Eclipse 500, took off for the first time on 26 August 2002, powered by two 900 lbf (4.0 kN) Pratt & Whitney Canada PW600s. Between then and the end of production in 2008, 260 were produced.

Another new small jet, the 10,701-pound (4.854 t) Honda HA-420 HondaJet, first flew on 3 December 2003 powered by two 2,050 lbf (9.1 kN) GE Honda HF120 engines mounted above the wing in a configuration unique amongst business jets. As of March 2020, 150 had been delivered.

It was followed by the 8,645-pound (3.921 t) MTOW Cessna Citation Mustang on 23 April 2005, powered by two 1,460 lbf (6.5 kN) Pratt & Whitney Canada PW600s and with more than 450 produced.

The Embraer Phenom 100 made its maiden flight on 26 July 2007. The 10,500-pound (4.75 t) MTOW airplane is powered by two 1,600 lbf (7.2 kN) Pratt & Whitney Canada PW600s. With its Phenom 300 development, nearly 600 have been built.

=== 2010s first flight ===
The first flight of the midsize, fly-by-wire, 7,000 lbf (31 kN) Honeywell HTF7000-powered Embraer Legacy 500 was on 27 November 2012. It was followed by the shorter Legacy 450 on 28 December 2013.

=== New models ===
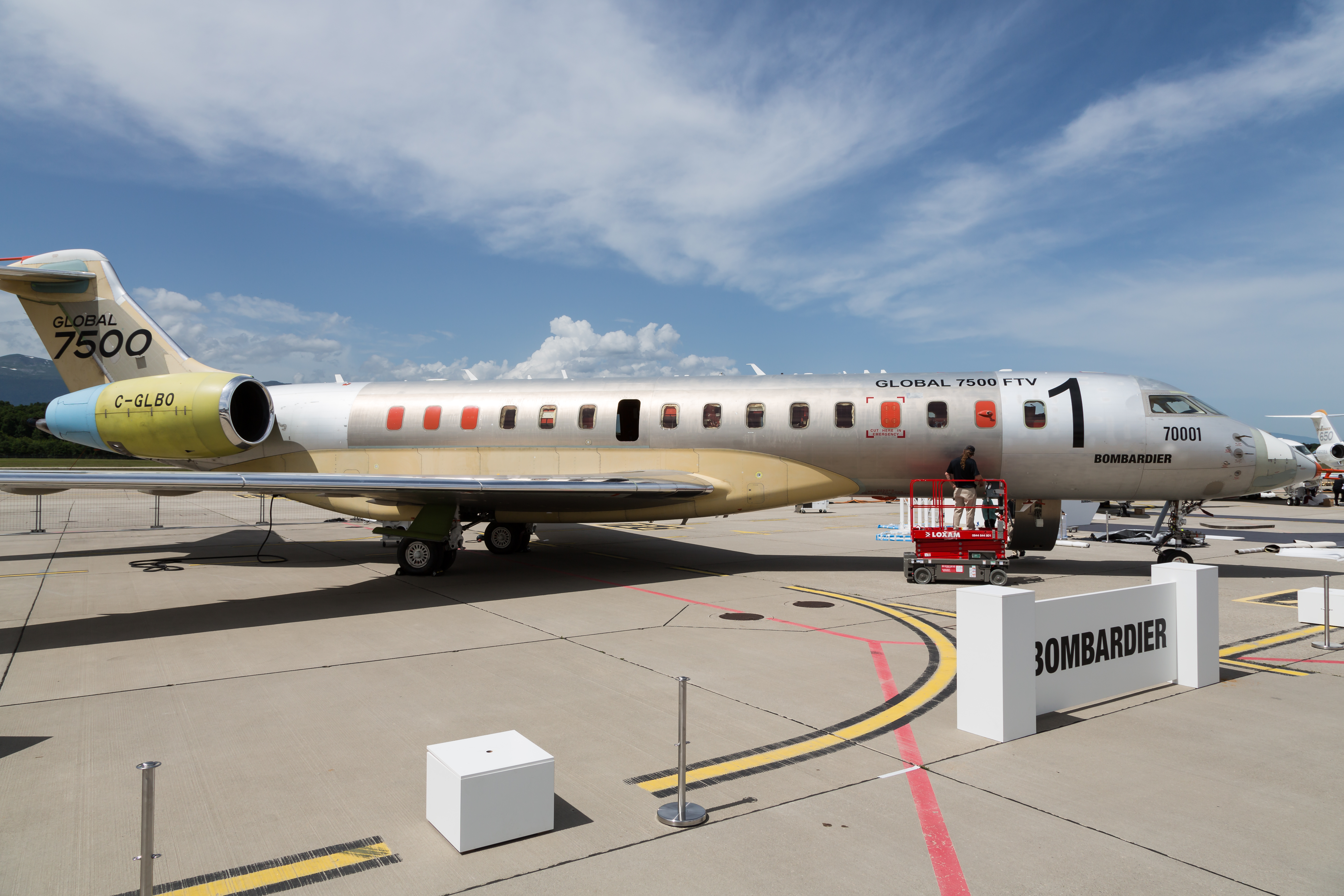
A Global 7500 prototype in 2018

After peaking in 2008, deliveries slowed due to political instability but the industry hopes to revive demand by introducing more attractive and competitive new models, four in 2018:

- the 7,400 nmi (13,700 km) range Bombardier Global 7500 large-cabin jet, before the 7,900 nmi (14,600 km) Global 8000 in 2019;
- the 5,200 nmi (9,600 km) large-cabin Gulfstream G500, replacing the Gulfstream G450, then the longer, 6,500 nmi (12,000 km) G600 eventually superseding the G550;
- the 3,500 nmi (6,500 km) Cessna Citation Longitude super midsize jet;
- the superlight Pilatus PC-24.

In October 2018, consultant Jetcraft expected 20 variants or new designs to enter service before 2023 (seven large, seven midsize and six small): in 2019 the Global 5500/6500, Gulfstream G600, Citation XLS++ and a CitationJet CJ4+/, while the Embraer Praetor 500/600 to be introduced in 2019 were predicted for 2021/2022; in 2020 a Gulfstream G750; in 2021 the Dassault Falcon 6X, Learjet 70XR/75XR and Global 7500XR; in 2022 the Bombardier Challenger 350XRS; in 2023 the Citation Hemisphere, an Embraer Legacy 700, Phenom 100V+, Dassault Falcon 9X, Bombardier Challenger 750 and Gulfstream G400NG; in 2025 a Citation Mustang 2+.

== Configuration ==
Most production business jets use two jet engines as a compromise between the operating economy of fewer engines and the ability to safely continue flight after an engine failure. Exceptions include the early Lockheed JetStar with four engines; the Dassault Falcon 50 and derivatives with three; and the Cirrus Vision SF50 with one, a configuration also used in several similar very light jet design concepts. Most business jets use podded engines mounted on the rear fuselage with a cruciform tail or T-tail to reduce interference drag and increase exhaust clearance. Practical limits on the ground clearance of these smaller aircraft have prompted designers to avoid the common jetliner configuration of a low wing with underslung podded engines. The sole business jet to use this layout, the early McDonnell 119, was rejected by the USAF due to foreign object damage concerns, leading to the failure of the program. The recent HondaJet uses wing-mounted engines but mitigates this problem with its unique over-the-wing engine pods.

As with jetliners, swept wings are often used to increase cruise speed, but straight wings are also commonplace; notably, Cessna deliberately prioritized docile low-speed handling in choosing straight wings for many models in its popular Citation family, envisioning that owners transitioning from slower piston engined or turboprop aircraft would want to maintain the ability to use relatively short runways, and that lower approach speeds would ease single-pilot operations, particularly by relatively inexperienced owner-pilots.

Rolls-Royce plc powers over 3,000 business jets, 42% of the fleet: all the Gulfstreams and Bombardier Globals, the Cessna Citation X and Embraer Legacy 600, early Hawkers, and many small jets with the Williams-Rolls FJ44.

== Market ==
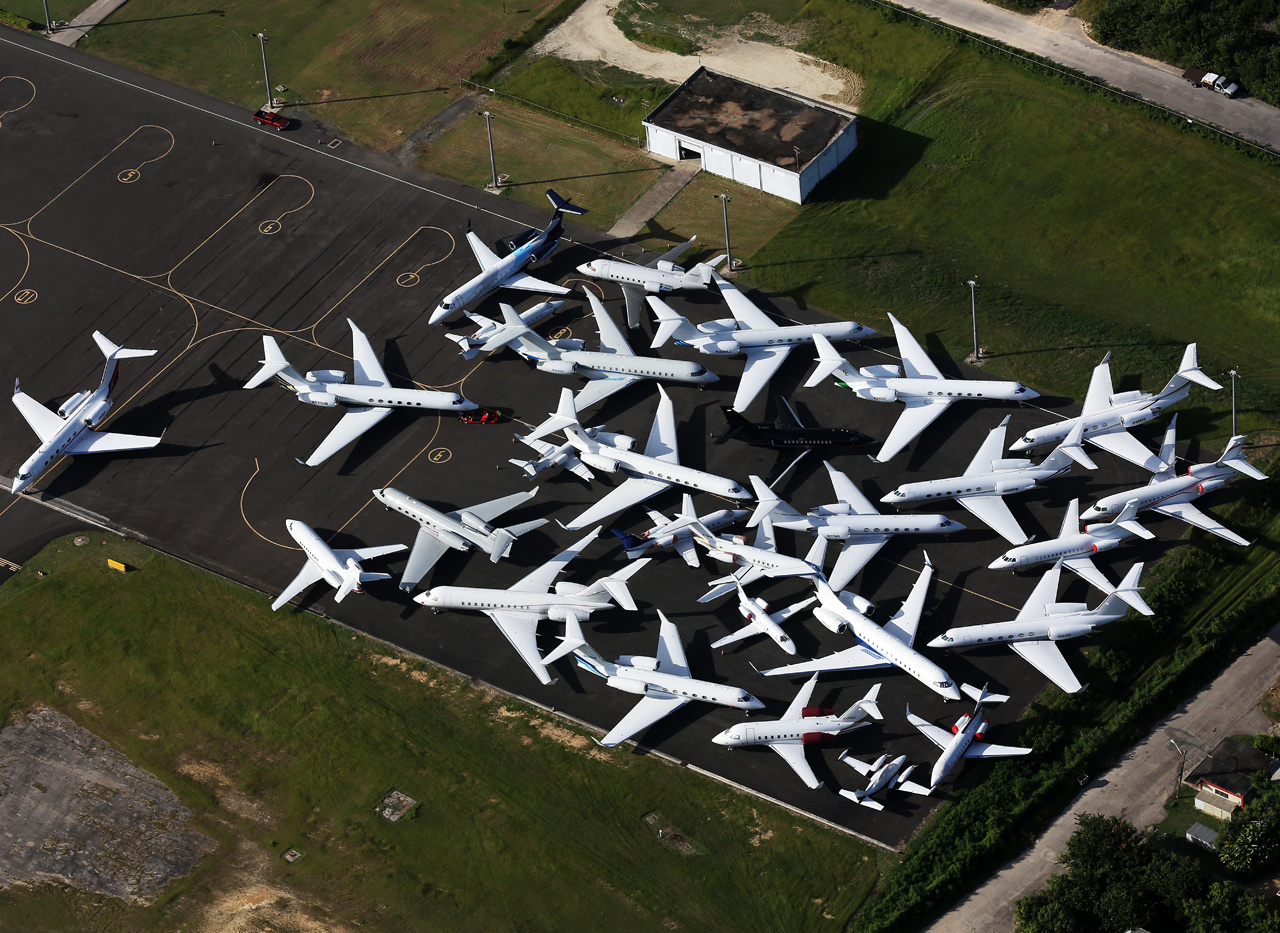
The apron at Anguilla Wallblake Airport clogged with business jets

=== Fleet ===
About 70% of the fleet was in North America at the end of 2011, the European market is the next largest, with growing activity in the Middle East, Asia, and Central America.

On 1 April 2017, there were 22,368 business jets in the worldwide fleet, of which 11.2% were for sale.

By October 2018, the entire private jet fleet was dominated by Textron (Beechcraft, Cessna and Hawker branded aircraft) with 43.9%, then Bombardier with 22.4%, Gulfstream with 13.0%, Dassault with 9.6% and Embraer with 5.8%, mostly in North America (64.6%), followed by Europe (13.0%) South America (12.1%) and Asia-Pacific (5.9%).

As on March 31, 2019, there are 22,125 business jets in the worldwide fleet and top 20 country markets account for 89% of this total fleet.

=== Market shares ===
In 2015 the total airplane billing amounted to US$21.9 billion, and 718 business jets were delivered to customers across the globe: 199 (27.7%) by Bombardier Aerospace, 166 (23.1%) by Textron Aviation, 154 (21.4%) by Gulfstream Aerospace, 120 (16.7%) by Embraer and 55 (7.7%) by Dassault Aviation.

In 2017, 676 business jets were shipped, led by Gulfstream with $6.56 billion for 120 aircraft, Bombardier with $5.2 billion for 140, Textron with $2.87 billion (including propeller aircraft and 180 jets), Dassault with $2.42 billion for 49 and Embraer with $1.35 billion for 109.

In 2022, 712 business jets were shipped, led by Gulfstream with $6.60 billion for 120 aircraft, Bombardier with $6,04 billion for 123, Textron Aviation with $3,62 billion, Dassault Aviation with $1,76 billion for 32, Embraer with $1,36 for 102 and Pilatus with $900 million for 123 aircraft.

Worldwide market
| Year | 1994 | 1995 | 1996 | 1997 | 1998 | 1999 | 2000 | 2001 | 2002 | 2003 | 2004 | 2005 | 2006 | 2007 | 2008 | 2009 | 2010 | 2011 | 2012 | 2013 | 2014 | 2015 |
|---|---|---|---|---|---|---|---|---|---|---|---|---|---|---|---|---|---|---|---|---|---|---|
| Planes | 278 | 300 | 316 | 438 | 515 | 667 | 752 | 784 | 676 | 518 | 592 | 750 | 887 | 1137 | 1317 | 874 | 767 | 696 | 672 | 718 | 722 | 718 |
| Value ($B) | 2.92 | 3.35 | 3.88 | 6.02 | 10.19 | 7.22 | 11.66 | 12.12 | 10.43 | 8.62 | 10.40 | 13.16 | 16.56 | 19.35 | 21.95 | 17.44 | 18.00 | 17.26 | 17.11 | 21.06 | 22.02 | 21.87 |
| Average ($M) | 10.5 | 11.2 | 12.3 | 13.7 | 14 | 15.3 | 15.5 | 15.5 | 15.4 | 16.6 | 17.6 | 17.5 | 18.7 | 17 | 16.7 | 20 | 23.5 | 24.8 | 25.5 | 29.3 | 30.5 | 30.5 |

=== Second hand ===
The residual value level for a five-year old aircraft is at 56% of the list price. A new business aircraft typically depreciates by 50% in five years before depreciation flattens between years 10 and 15, and the owner of a 15-to-20 year old aircraft is often the last, matching luxury cars.

Business jets have varying value retention, between the leading Embraer Phenom 300E, sold for $9.45 million in 2018 and expected to retain 68% of its value 15 years later for $6.46 million in 2033, and the trailing $24.5 million Gulfstream G280, predicted to retain 42% of its value for $10.25 million.

=== Forecasts ===
In October 2017 Jetcraft forecast 8,349 unit deliveries in the next decade for $252 billion, a $30.2 million average. Cessna should lead the numbers with 27.3% of the deliveries ahead of Bombardier with 20.9%, while Gulfstream would almost lead the revenue market share with 27.8% trailing Bombardier with 29.2%. For 2016–2025, Jetcraft forecast Pratt & Whitney Canada should be the first engine supplier with 30% of the $24 billion revenue, in front of the current leader Rolls-Royce at 25%. Honeywell will hold 45% of the $16 billion in avionics revenue ahead of Rockwell Collins with 37% and Garmin.

For 2019–2028, Honeywell predicts 7,700 aircraft to be delivered for $251 billion. Its breakdown is 62% big (87% in value) – super-midsize to business liner, 10% midsize (7% in value) – light-medium to medium, and 28% small (6% in value). The global demand is expected to come from North America for 61%, 16% from Europe, 12% from Latin America, 7% from Asia-Pacific and 4% from Middle East and Africa.

For the next decade, Aviation Week predicts 8,683 business jets and 2,877 turboprops deliveries, from 792 jets in 2019 to 917 in 2028, and mostly in North America with 5,986 jets and 2,024 turboprops worth $126.1 billion. Most value will come from ultra-long-range jets with $104.7 billion, followed by super-midsize jets for $33.3 billion and large jets for $30.6 billion. The fleet was predicted to grow from 31,300 aircraft to nearly 35,600 with Textron leading the market with 25% of deliveries worth $32.1 billion. For the decade starting in 2018, 22,190 engine deliveries were forecast (including several turboprop engine models), led by the Honeywell HTF7000, Williams FJ44 and Pratt & Whitney Canada PW300. The average usage was forecast to be 365 flight hours per aircraft per year.

=== Engines ===
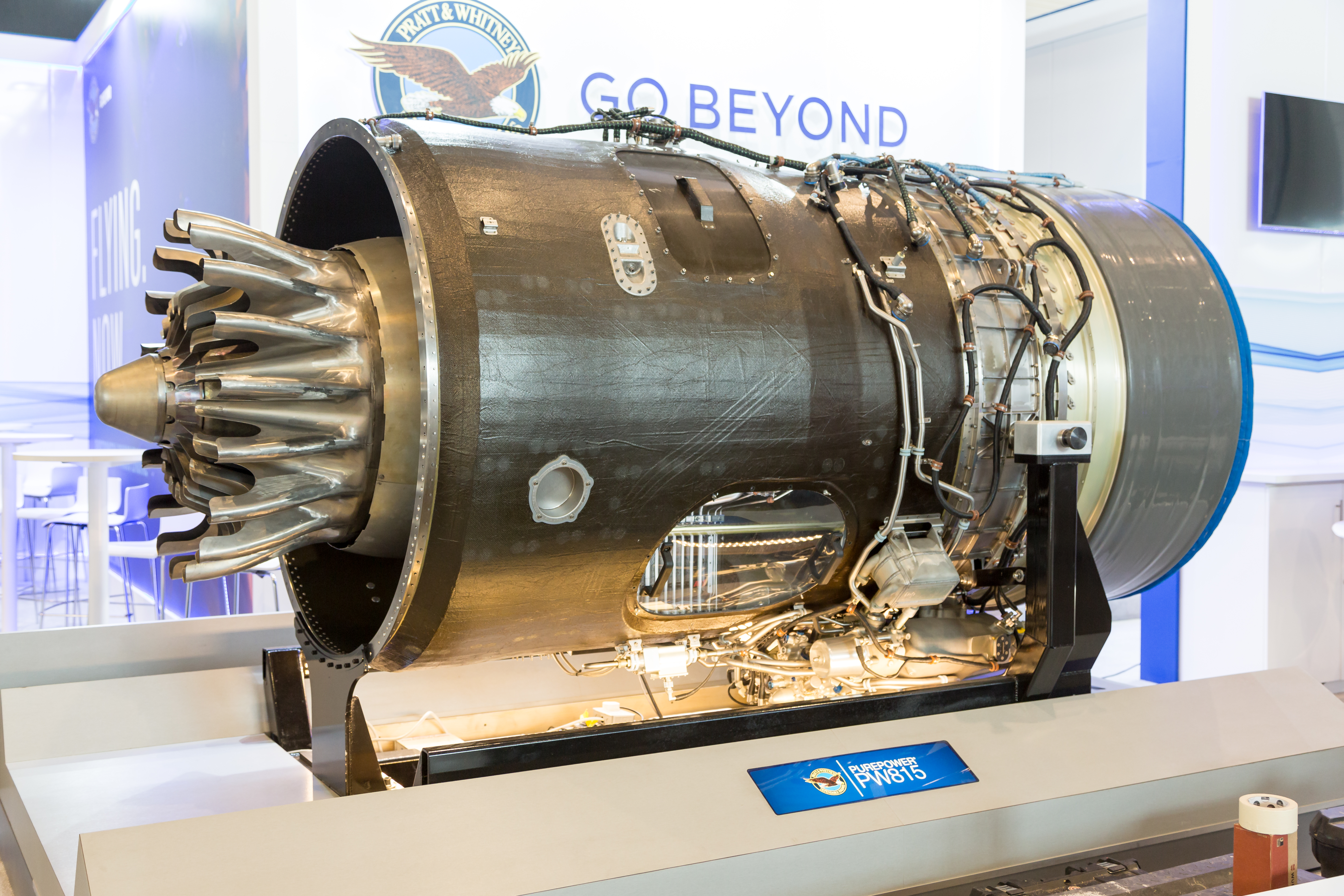
Pratt & Whitney Canada PW815

Built by Pratt & Whitney Canada, variants of the 4,700–8,000 lbf (21–36 kN) PW300 power the Dassault Falcon 7X and Dassault Falcon 8X trijets and Dassault Falcon 2000 twinjet. The 10,000–20,000 lbf (45–89 kN) PW800 was launched in 2008 but was selected for the Cessna Citation Columbus, cancelled a year after. It was then chosen for the Gulfstream G500/G600 launched in 2014 and due to enter service in 2018/2019, and picked in 2018 for the Dassault Falcon 6X 2021 first flight. The 12,000 lbf (53 kN) Safran Silvercrest was rejected for the cancelled Falcon 5X, it is still selected for the Cessna Citation Hemisphere, but the aircraft development is suspended until the turbofan is perfected. GE Aviation produces the 10,000–20,000 lbf (44–89 kN) Passport for the Bombardier Global 7500, due to enter service in 2018, and is developing an engine for the supersonic Aerion AS2.

Rolls-Royce plc was revealed as the engine supplier for the Global 5500/6500 with the Rolls-Royce Pearl 15, an improved BR710 resembling the Gulfstream G650's BR725. The AE3007C powered Cessna Citation X+ is near its production end. The Honeywell HTF7700L replaced the Silvercrest for the Citation Longitude, due to enter service in 2018, and already powers the Bombardier Challenger 300/350, Gulfstream G280 and Embraer Legacy 450/500. Its 3,500–5,000 lbf (16–22 kN) TFE731 powers the Learjet 70/75 and Dassault Falcon 900LX. Williams International's FJ44 powers the Pilatus PC-24, launched in 2013 and introduced in early 2018, the Nextant 400XTi and the in-development SyberJet SJ30i, as well as the Cessna Citation CJ3+/4, while the smaller FJ33 powers the Cirrus Vision SF50 single-engine business jet.

== Operators ==
There are three basic types of operators that own, manage and operate private jets.

=== Flight departments ===
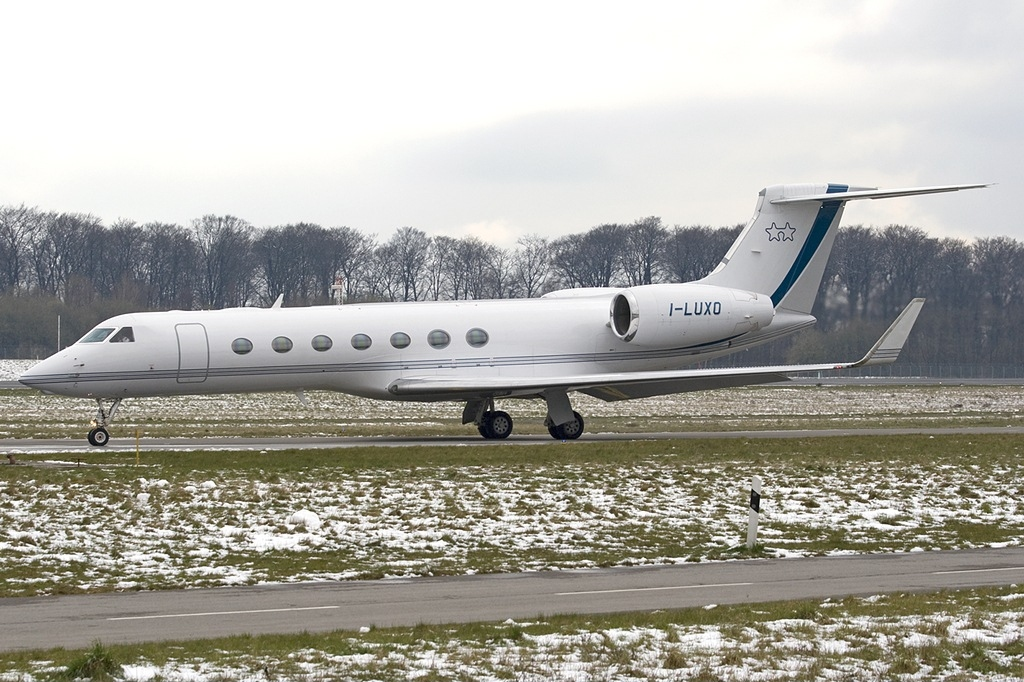
A Gulfstream G550 owned by Luxottica

Flight departments are corporate-owned operators that manage the aircraft of a specific company. Ford Motor Company, Chrysler, and Altria are examples of companies that own, maintain and operate their own fleet of private aircraft for their employees. Flight departments handle all aspects of aircraft operation and maintenance. In the United States, flight-department aircraft operate under FAR 91 operating rules.

A 2010 study by the United States National Business Aviation Association found that small and midsize companies that use private jets produce a 219% higher earnings growth rate than those that strictly use airlines.

=== Charter companies ===
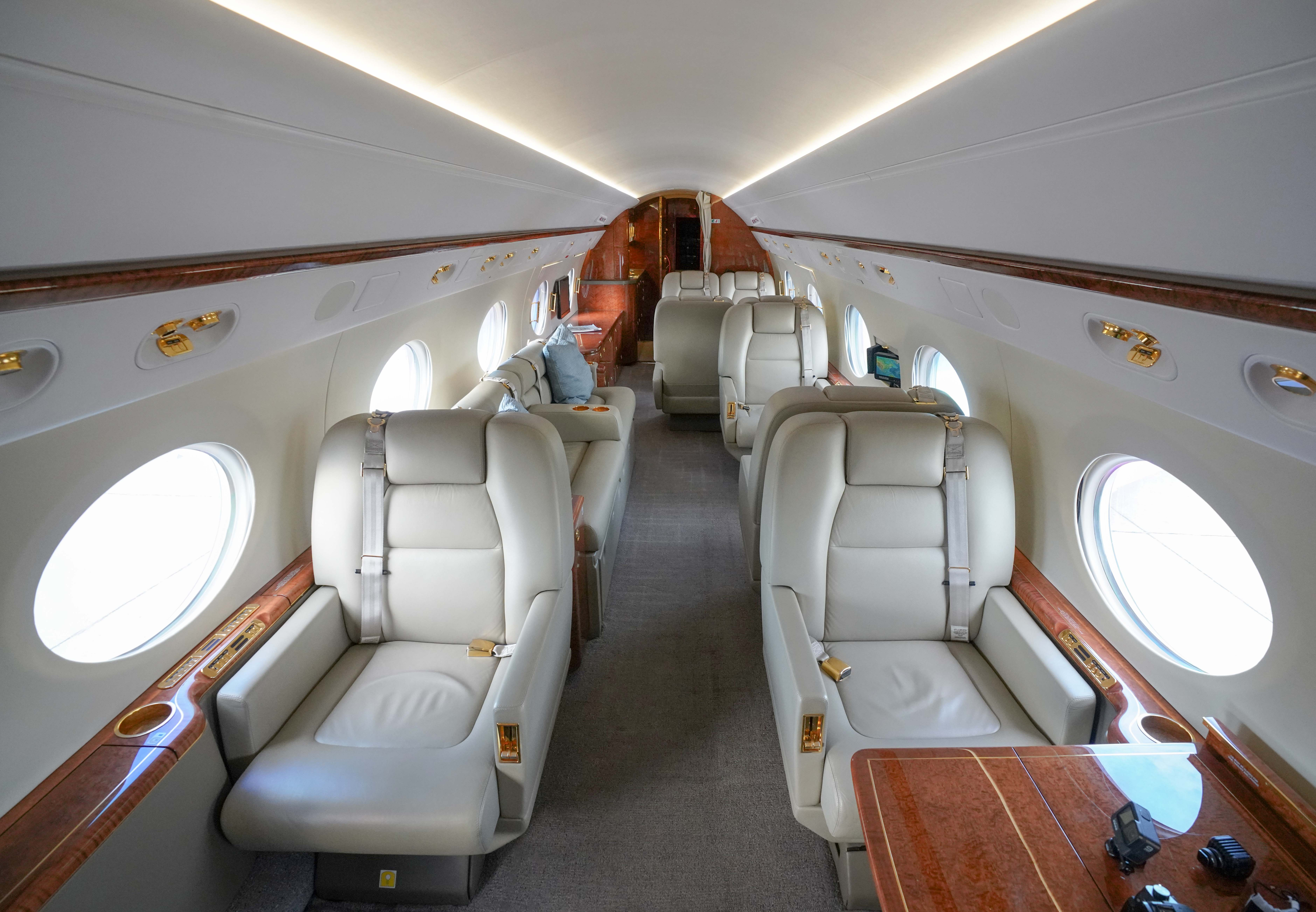
Interior of a NetJets Gulfstream G450

Charter operators own or manage private jets for multiple clients. Like traditional flight departments, charter companies handle all aspects of aircraft operation and maintenance. However, they are not aligned with just one corporation. They manage aircraft for a private owner or corporation and also handle the sales of available flight time on the aircraft they own or manage. Maintenance services can also be provided.

In the United States, business aircraft may be operated under either FAR 91 as private operations for the business purposes of the owner, or under FAR 135 of the Federal Aviation Regulations as commercial operations for the business purposes of a third party. One common arrangement for operational flexibility purposes is for the aircraft's owner to operate the aircraft under FAR 91 when needed for its own purposes, and to allow a third-party charter-manager to operate it under FAR 135 when the aircraft is needed for the business purposes of third parties (such as for other entities within the corporate group of the aircraft's owner).

Aircraft charter brokers have entered the marketplace through the ease of setting up a website and business online. Aircraft charter operators are legally responsible for the safe operation of aircraft and charter brokers require no economic authority and are largely unregulated. The Department of Transportation requires that air charter brokers disclose to the consumer that they do not operate aircraft and cannot use terms like "our fleet of aircraft", "we operate", "our charter service" and others.

=== Fractional ownership ===
Since 1996 the term "fractional jet" has been used in connection with business aircraft owned by a consortium of companies. Under such arrangements, overhead costs such as flight crew, hangarage and maintenance are split among the users.

Fractional ownership of aircraft involves an individual or corporation that pays an upfront equity share for the cost of an aircraft. If four parties are involved, a partner would pay one-fourth of the aircraft price (a "quarter share"). That partner is now an equity owner in that aircraft and can sell the equity position if necessary. This also entitles the new owner to a certain number of hours of flight time on that aircraft, or any comparable aircraft in the fleet. Additional fees include monthly management fees and incidentals such as catering and ground transportation. In the United States, fractional-ownership operations may be regulated by either FAA part 91 or part 135.

Buying blocks of time in predetermined increments involves buying blocks of time in hours. This model usually depends on how many flight hours a client will be needing. Pay as you fly resembles the business model used by commercial airlines where a client only pays for a flight they use. The downside to this model is that clients find it difficult to secure flights because most private flights are usually booked in advance.

Paying a flat rate for unlimited usage as the name implies, uses a business model where clients pay a flat rate, and then the jet is made available to them for the duration that payment lasts. This model makes it possible for a client to pay a certain amount for unlimited access and usage to a jet, or a fleet of jets for the duration. This model has been discontinued by most private jet hire companies because clients have exploited the usage in the past. This model now employs a fair usage policy.

=== Surveillance ===
With smaller equipment, long-range business aircraft can be modified as surveillance aircraft to perform specialized missions cost-effectively, from ground surveillance to maritime patrol:

- The 99,500 lb (45,100 kg), 6,000 nmi Bombardier Global 6000 is the platform for the USAF Northrop Grumman E-11A Battlefield Airborne Communications Node, the radar-carrying ground-surveillance Raytheon Sentinel for the UK Royal Air Force, and Saab's GlobalEye AEW&C carrying its Erieye AESA radar as UK's Marshall ADG basis for Elint/Sigint for the United Arab Emirates; it is also the base for the proposed Saab AB Swordfish MPA and the USAF Lockheed Martin J-Stars Recap battlefield-surveillance program, while IAI's ELI-3360 MPA is based on the Global 5000;
- The 91,000 lb (41,000 kg), 6,750 nmi Gulfstream G550 was selected for the IAI EL/W-2085 Conformal Airborne Early Warning AESA radar for Italy, Singapore and Israel (which also has IAI Sigint G550s) while L3 Technologies transfers the U.S. Compass Call electronic-attack system to the G550 CAEW-based EC-37B, like the NC-37B range-support aircraft, and will modify others for Australia's AISREW program, Northrop Grumman proposes the G550 for the J-Stars Recap;
- Dassault Aviation developed the Falcon 900 MPA and Falcon 2000 Maritime Multirole Aircraft for France (which delayed its Avsimar requirement), South Korea and the Japan Coast Guard with a mission system developed with L3 and Thales Group;
- Embraer delivered several EMB-145s as a platform for AEW&C, MPA and multi-intelligence;

== Classes ==
Business jets can be categorized according to their size.

=== Very light jets ===
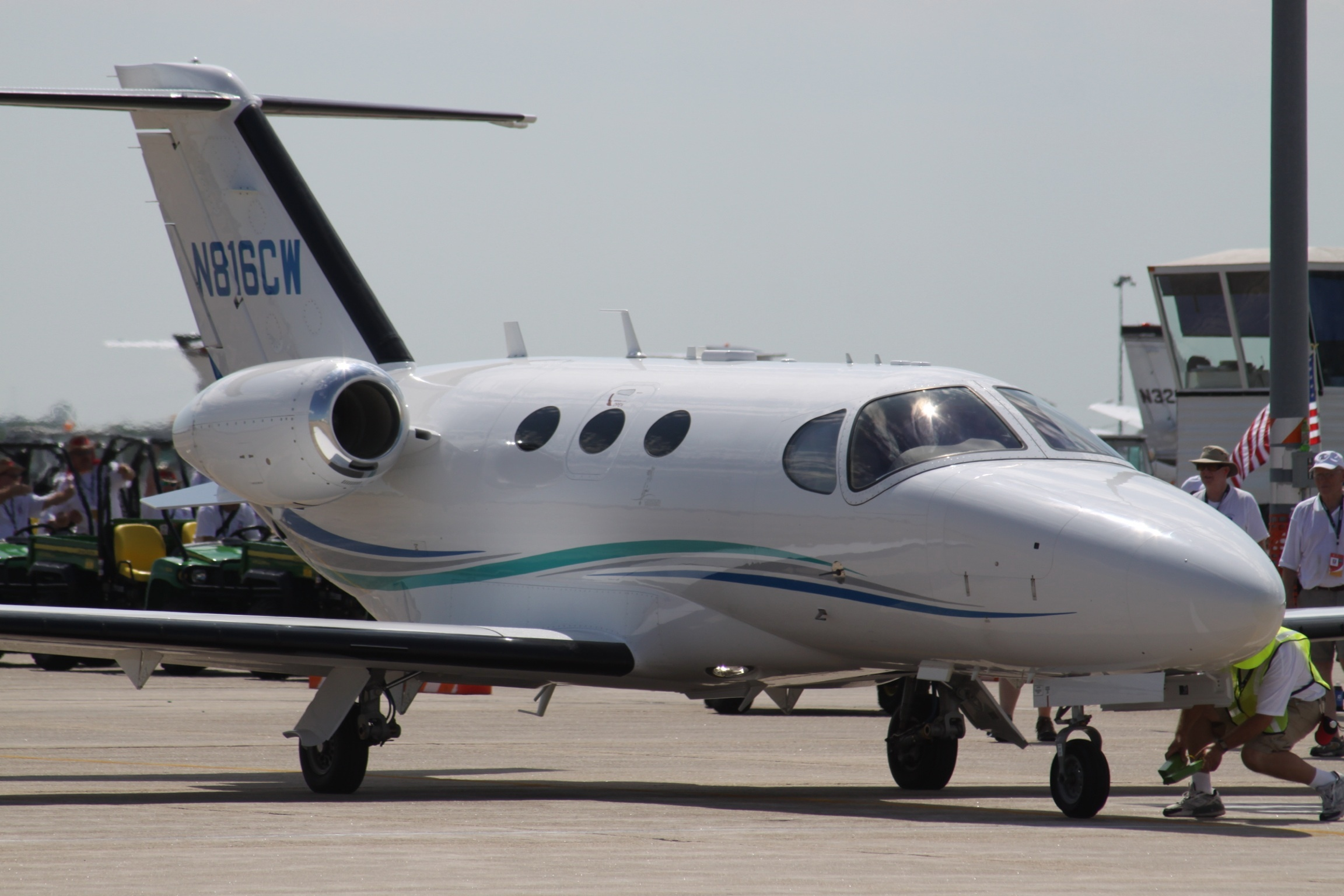
The most-sold VLJ is the Cessna Citation Mustang.

The very light jet (VLJ) is a classification initiated by the release of the Eclipse 500, on 31 December 2006, which was originally available at around US$1.5 million, cheaper than existing business jets and comparable with turboprop aircraft. Its introduction coincided with a speculative bubble for air taxi services, exemplified by DayJet, which ceased operations in September 2008. Eclipse Aviation failed to sustain its business model and filed for bankruptcy in February 2009.

A 10,010 lb (4,540 kg) MTOW limit was cited by engineering company Burns & McDonnell in 2005, Popular Mechanics in 2007, or GlobalSecurity.org.

Cessna simultaneously developed the Citation Mustang, a six-place twinjet (2 crew + 4 passengers), followed by the Embraer Phenom 100 and the Honda Jet. They have a maximum takeoff weight lighter than the FAR Part 23 12,500-pound (5,700 kg) limit, and are approved for single-pilot operation. They typically accommodate 6–7 passengers over a 1174 nmi average range, with a $4.4 million mean price.

Very light jets, 4 pax mission
| Model | Pax | Length | Span | int. L | int. W | Engines | Thrust | MTOW | Range | Cruise | Fuel/nmi |
|---|---|---|---|---|---|---|---|---|---|---|---|
| Cirrus SF50 G2 | 4–6 | 30.9 ft | 38.3 ft | 9.8 ft | 5.1 ft | 1 FJ33 | 1846 lbf | 6,000 lb | 622 nmi | 233 kn | 1.51 lb (0.68 kg) |
| Phenom 100EV | 5–7 | 42.1 ft | 40.4 ft | 11.0 ft | 5.1 ft | 2 PW617 | 3460 lbf | 10,703 lb | 1,092 nmi | 340 kn | 1.87 lb (0.85 kg) |
| Citation M2 | 7 | 42.6 ft | 47.3 ft | 11.0 ft | 4.8 ft | 2 FJ44 | 3930 lbf | 10,700 lb | 1,183 nmi | 370 kn | 1.99 lb (0.90 kg) |
| HondaJet Elite | 5–6 | 42.6 ft | 39.8 ft | 12.1 ft | 5.0 ft | 2 HF120 | 4100 lbf | 10,700 lb | 1,171 nmi | 342 kn | 1.75 lb (0.79 kg) |

=== Light jets ===
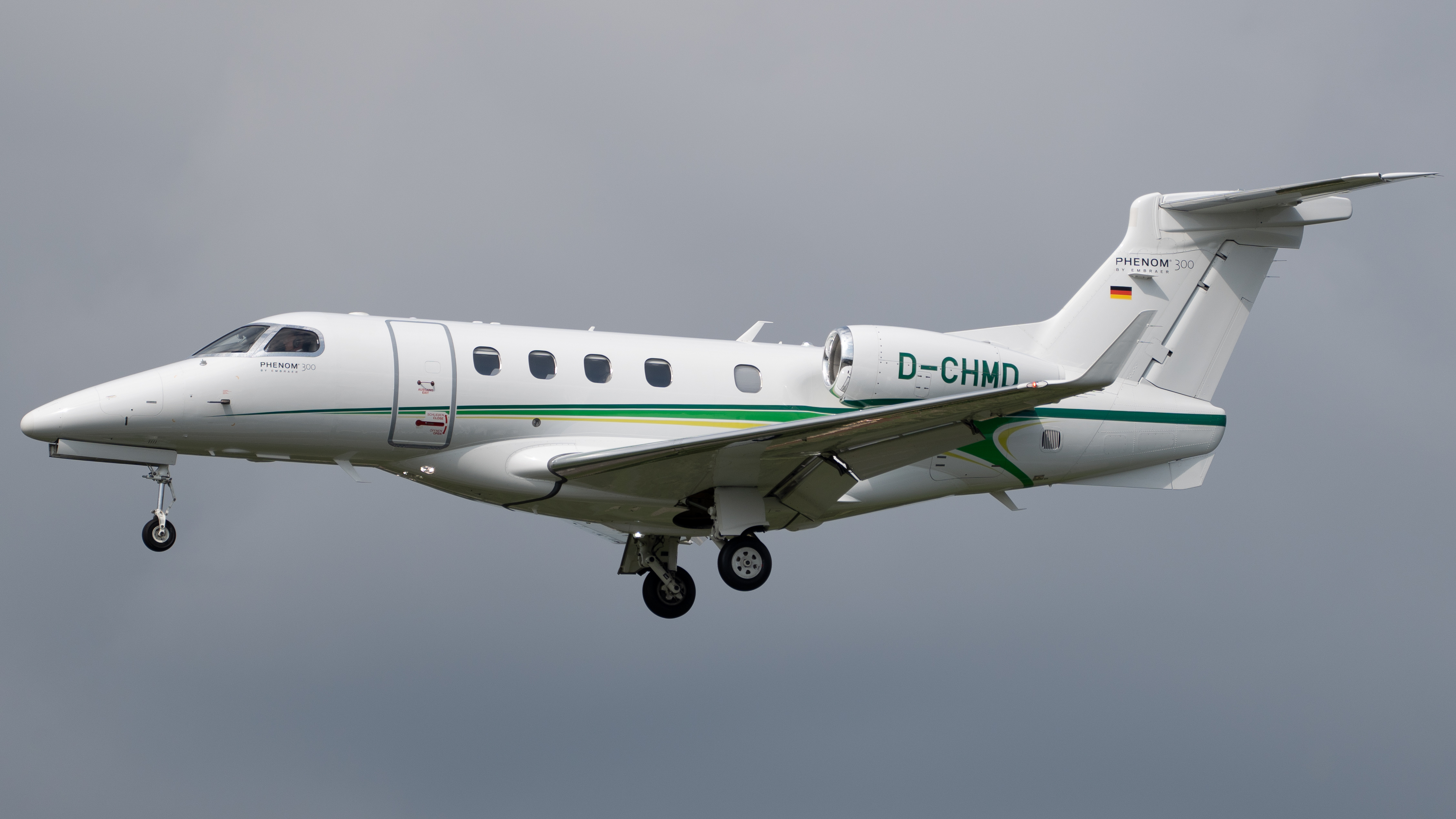
With over 800 deliveries from 2011 to 2024, the Embraer Phenom 300 has been the best-selling light jet for 13 consecutive years

Light jets have been a staple of the business jet industry since the advent of the Learjet 23 in the early 1960s. They provide access to small airports and the speed to be an effective air travel tool. Aircraft of this class include:

- Beechcraft Premier
- Cessna CitationJet/CJ1/2/3
- Cessna Citation II/Bravo/Ultra/Encore
- Embraer Phenom 300
- Hawker 400
- Learjet 31
- Learjet 40

They typically accommodate 6–8 passengers over a 1953 nmi average range, with a $9.6 million mean price.

Light Jets, 4 pax mission
| Model | Pax | Length | Span | int. L | int. W | Engines | Thrust | MTOW | Range | Cruise | Fuel/nmi |
|---|---|---|---|---|---|---|---|---|---|---|---|
| SyberJet SJ30i | 5–6 | 46.8 ft | 42.3 ft | 12.5 ft | 4.8 ft | 2 FJ44 | 4600 lbf | 13,950 lb | 2,205 nmi | 408 kn | 1.68 lb (0.76 kg) |
| Citation CJ3+ | 8–9 | 51.2 ft | 53.3 ft | 15.7 ft | 4.8 ft | 2 FJ44 | 5640 lbf | 13,870 lb | 1,825 nmi | 376 kn | 2.06 lb (0.93 kg) |
| Phenom 300E | 7–10 | 51.2 ft | 52.2 ft | 17.2 ft | 5.1 ft | 2 PW535E1 | 6956 lbf | 18,387 lb | 1,936 nmi | 411 kn | 2.33 lb (1.06 kg) |
| Nextant 400XTi | 7–9 | 48.4 ft | 43.5 ft | 15.5 ft | 4.9 ft | 2 FJ44 | 6104 lbf | 16,300 lb | 1,801 nmi | 406 kn | 2.06 lb (0.93 kg) |
| Citation CJ4 | 8–9 | 53.3 ft | 50.8 ft | 17.3 ft | 4.8 ft | 2 FJ44 | 7242 lbf | 17,110 lb | 1,927 nmi | 416 kn | 2.55 lb (1.16 kg) |
| Pilatus PC-24 | 8–11 | 55.2 ft | 55.8 ft | 23.0 ft | 5.6 ft | 2 FJ44-4A | 6840 lbf | 17,650 lb | 2,035 nmi | 367 kn | 2.42 lb (1.10 kg) |
| Learjet 70 | 6–7 | 56.0 ft | 50.9 ft | 17.7 ft | 5.1 ft | 2 TFE731 | 7700 lbf | 21,500 lb | 2,045 nmi | 426 kn | 2.48 lb (1.12 kg) |

=== Mid-size jets ===
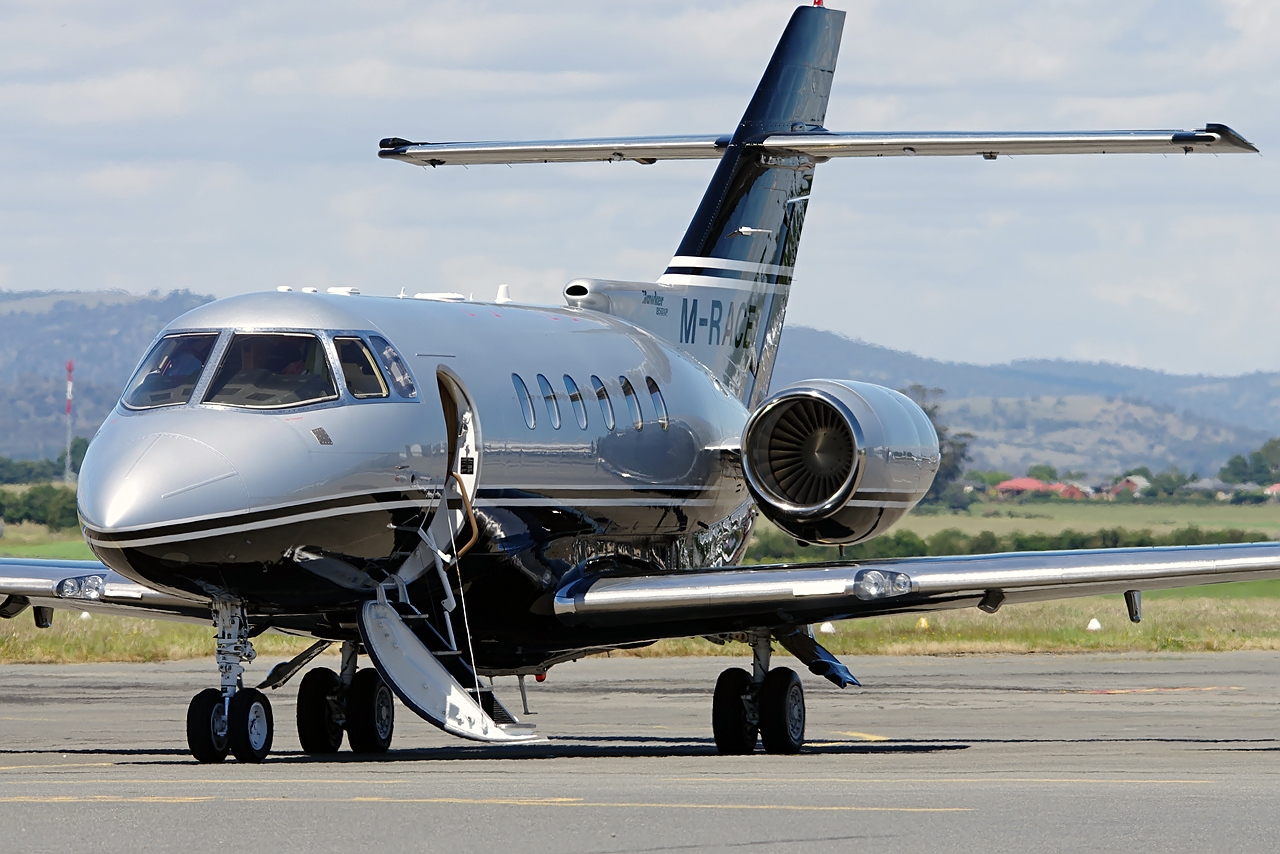
Nearly 1700 BAe 125/Hawker 800 have been built.

These aircraft are suitable for longer-range travel such as transcontinental flights and for travel with larger passenger capacity requirements. Aircraft of this class include:

- Citation Excel/XLS(+),
- Hawker 800/750/850/900/1000,
- Learjet 45
- Learjet 60.

They typically accommodate 9 passengers over a 2540 nmi average range, with a $15.7 million mean price.

Mid-size jets, 4 pax mission
| Model | Pax | Length | Span | int. L | int. W | Engines | Thrust | MTOW | Range | Cruise | Fuel/nmi |
|---|---|---|---|---|---|---|---|---|---|---|---|
| Citation XLS+ | 9–12 | 52.5 ft | 56.3 ft | 18.5 ft | 5.7 ft | 2 PW545 | 8238 lbf | 20,200 lb | 1,841 nmi | 398 kn | 2.98 lb |
| Learjet 75 | 8–9 | 58.0 ft | 50.9 ft | 19.8 ft | 5.1 ft | 2 TFE731 | 7700 lbf | 21,500 lb | 2,026 nmi | 427 kn | 2.50 lb |
| Legacy 450 | 7–9 | 64.7 ft | 66.5 ft | 20.6 ft | 6.8 ft | 2 HTF7000 | 13080 lbf | 35,759 lb | 2,904 nmi | 431 kn | 3.54 lb |
| Praetor 500 | 7–9 | 64.7 ft | 66.5 ft | 20.6 ft | 6.8 ft | 2 HTF7000 | 13080 lbf | | 3,250 nmi | | |
| Citation Latitude | 9 | 62.3 ft | 72.3 ft | 21.8 ft | 6.4 ft | 2 PW300 | 11814 lbf | 30,800 lb | 2,678 nmi | 401 kn | 3.58 lb |

=== Super mid-size jets ===
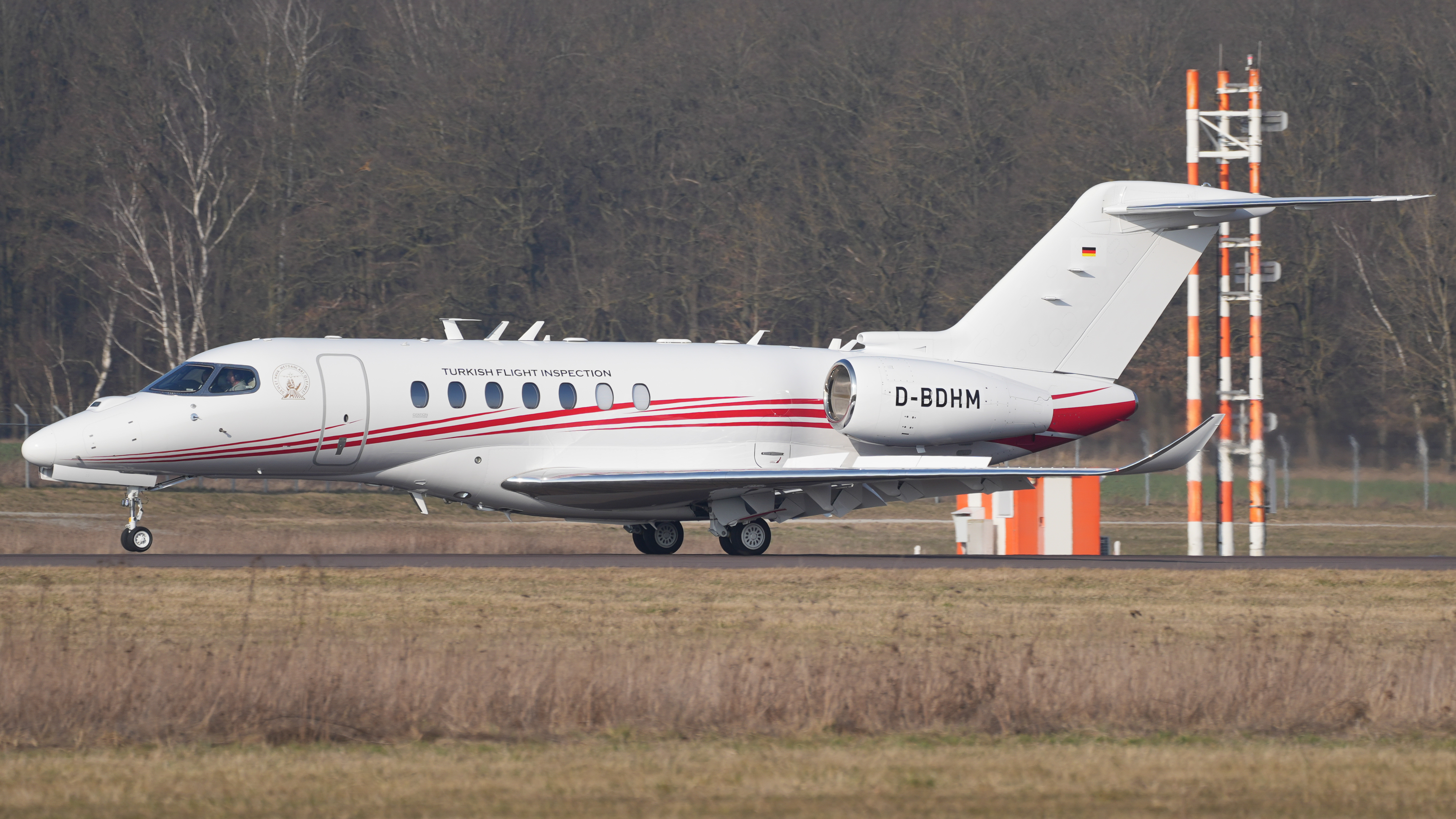
The newest clean-sheet super-midsize business jet is the Cessna Citation Longitude.

Super mid-size jets feature wide-body cabin space, high-altitude capability, speed, and long range. These jets combine transatlantic capability with the speed and comfort of a wide-body, high-altitude aircraft. Aircraft of this class include:

- Cessna Citation Longitude
- Cessna Citation Sovereign
- Cessna Citation X
- Bombardier Challenger 300/350
- Dassault Falcon 50
- Gulfstream G200/G250
- Hawker 4000

They typically accommodate 10–11 passengers over a 3420 nmi average range, with a $22.2 million mean price:

Super mid-size jets, 4 pax mission
| Model | Pax | Length | Span | int. L | int. W | Engines | Thrust | MTOW | Range | Cruise | Fuel/nmi |
|---|---|---|---|---|---|---|---|---|---|---|---|
| Citation Longitude | 8-12 | 73.2 ft | 68.9 ft | 25.2 ft | 6.4 ft | 2 HTF7700L | 15,300 lbf | 39,500 lb | 3,500 nmi | 483 kn | 3.79 |
| Citation Sovereign+ | 9–12 | 63.5 ft | 72.3 ft | 25.3 ft | 5.7 ft | 2 PW300 | 11814 lbf | 30,775 lb | 3,069 nmi | 402 kn | 3.15 lb |
| Legacy 500 | 8–12 | 68.1 ft | 66.4 ft | 24.6 ft | 6.8 ft | 2 HTF7000 | 14072 lbf | 38,360 lb | 3,125 nmi | 433 kn | 3.59 lb |
| Falcon 2000S/EX | 10–19 | 66.3 ft | 70.2 ft | 26.2 ft | 7.7 ft | 2 PW300 | 14000 lbf | 41,000 lb | 3,540 nmi | 430 kn | 3.60 lb |
| Praetor 600 | 8–12 | 68.1 ft | 66.4 ft | 24.6 ft | 6.8 ft | 2 HTF7000 | 15056 lbf | 42,857 lb | 4,018 nmi | 423 kn | 3.58 lb |
| Gulfstream G280 | 10–19 | 66.8 ft | 63.0 ft | 25.8 ft | 7.2 ft | 2 HTF7000 | 15248 lbf | 39,600 lb | 3,646 nmi | 451 kn | 3.50 lb |
| Challenger 350 | 9-11 | 68.7 ft | 69.0 ft | 25.2 ft | 7.2 ft | 2 HTF7000 | 14646 lbf | 40,600 lb | 3,250 nmi | 448 kn | 3.76 lb |

=== Large jets ===
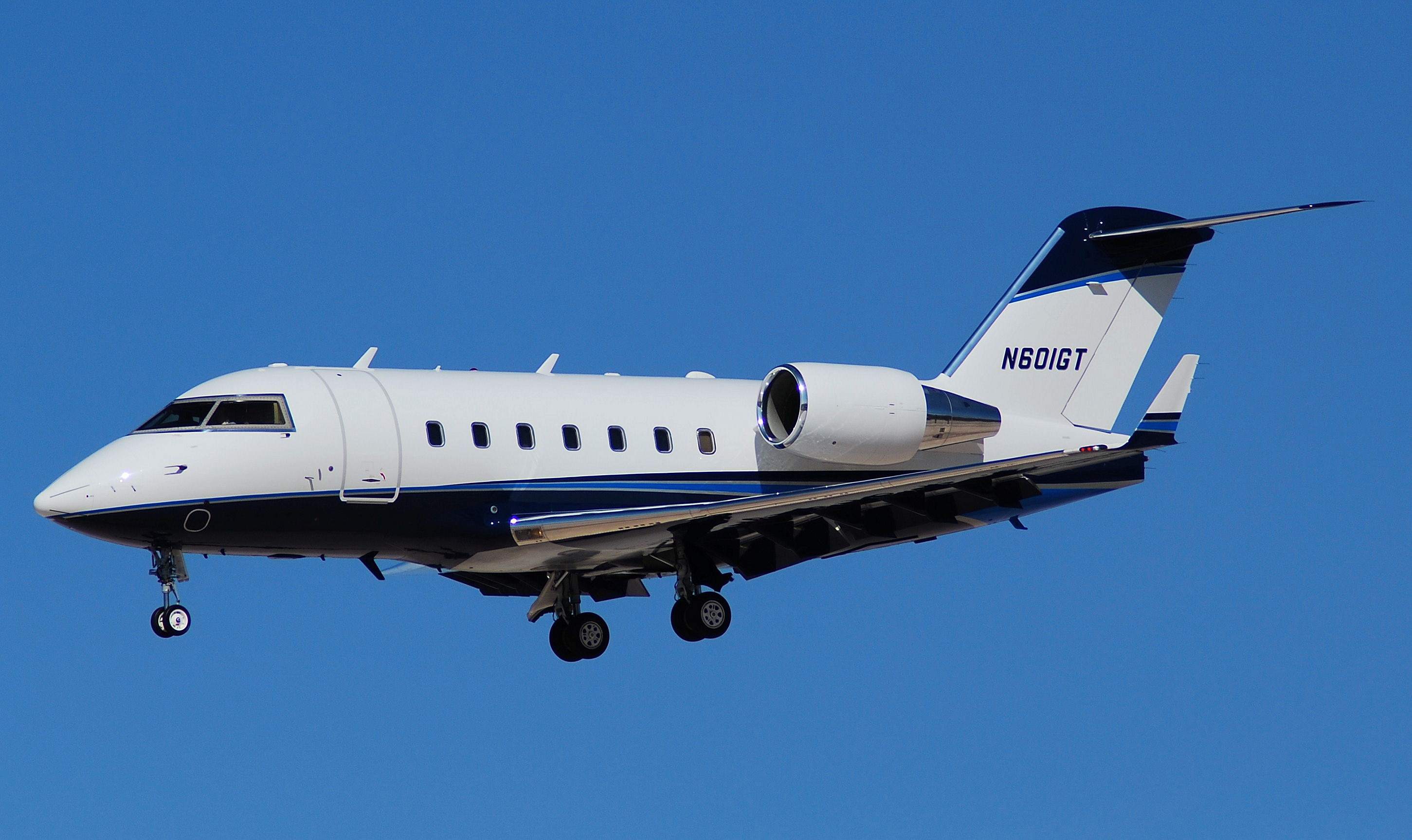
More than 1000 Challenger 600 have been produced.

- Bombardier Challenger 600
- Dassault Falcon 2000(ER)
- Dassault Falcon 900
- Embraer Legacy 600/650

They typically accommodate 13–14 passengers over a 4,000 nmi average range, with a $33.8 million mean price.

Large Jets, 4 pax mission
| Model | Pax | Length | Span | int. L | int. W | Engines | Thrust | MTOW | Range | Cruise | Fuel/nmi |
|---|---|---|---|---|---|---|---|---|---|---|---|
| Embraer Legacy 650E | 13–19 | 86.4 ft | 69.5 ft | 42.4 ft | 6.9 ft | 2 AE3007 | 18040 lbf | 53,572 lb | 3,919 nmi | 415 kn | 4.70 lb |
| Challenger 650 | 12–19 | 68.4 ft | 64.3 ft | 25.6 ft | 7.9 ft | 2 CF34 | 18440 lbf | 48,200 lb | 4,011 nmi | 419 kn | 4.48 lb |
| Falcon 2000LXS/EX | 8–19 | 66.3 ft | 70.2 ft | 26.2 ft | 7.7 ft | 2 PW300 | 14000 lbf | 42,800 lb | 4,065 nmi | 430 kn | 3.64 lb |
| Falcon 900LX/EX | 12–19 | 66.3 ft | 70.2 ft | 33.2 ft | 7.7 ft | 3 TFE731 | 15000 lbf | 49,000 lb | 4,650 nmi | 420 kn | 4.07 lb |
| Gulfstream 500 | 13–19 | 91.2 ft | 86.3 ft | 41.5 ft | 7.6 ft | 2 PW814 | 30288 lbf | 79,600 lb | 5,292 nmi | 480 kn | 5.18 lb |

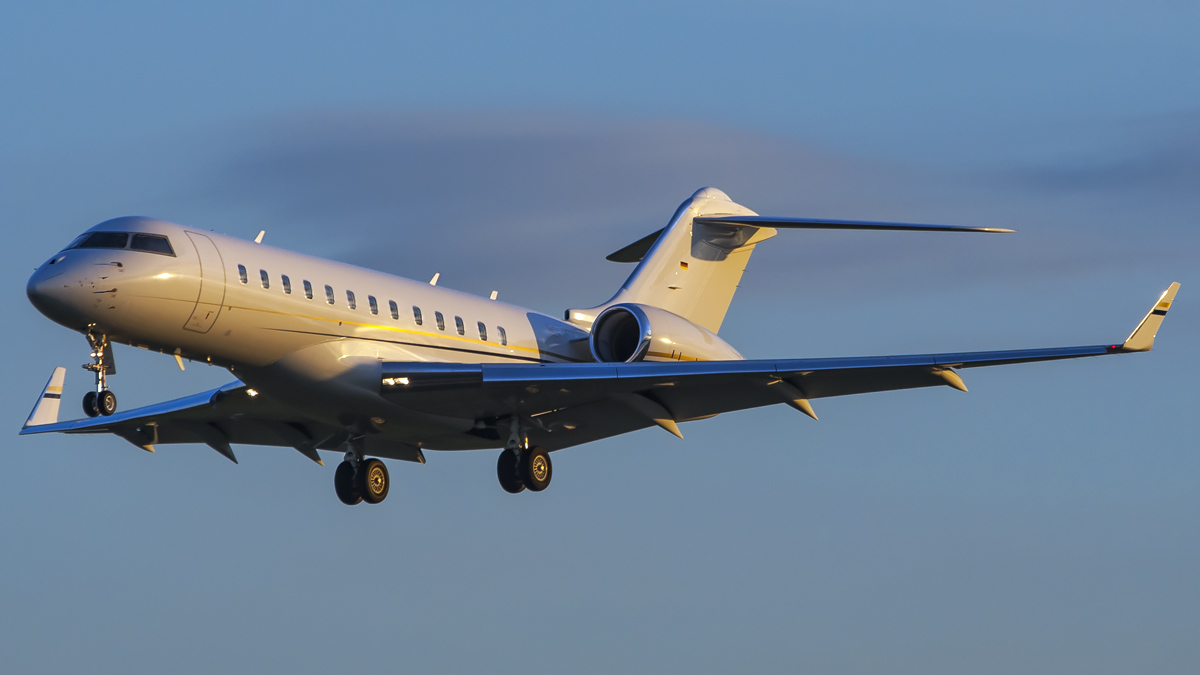
Over 750 Global Express have been made

=== Long range jets ===
- Dassault Falcon 7X
- Bombardier Global Express/5000/6000
- Gulfstream IV/G350/G450
- Gulfstream V/G500/G550
- Gulfstream G650(ER)
- Gulfstream G800

They typically accommodate 12–19 passengers over a 6500 nmi average range, with a $61.2 million mean price.

At 102 in (259 cm), the G650ER has the widest cabin yet but should be joined by the Falcon 5X (a Global 5000/G500 competitor) and its replacement, and the 4,500 nmi (8,300 km) Citation Hemisphere in 2021; at 98 in (249 cm), the Global 7000/8000 is wider than the 95 in (241 cm) Global 5000/6000, the same as the Gulfstream G500/G600 and the Canadair Challenger, while the Dassault Falcon 8X is 92 in (234 cm) wide and the G450/G550 88 in (224 cm).

Long Range Jets, 8 pax mission
| Model | Pax | Length | Span | int. L | int. W | Engines | Thrust | MTOW | Range | Cruise | Fuel/nmi |
|---|---|---|---|---|---|---|---|---|---|---|---|
| Global 5000 | 13–19 | 96.8 ft | 94.0 ft | 40.7 ft | 7.9 ft | 2 BR710 | 29500 lbf | 92,500 lb | 5,475 nmi (Note: 4 pax) | 463 kn | 6.52 lb |
| Falcon 7X | 12–19 | 76.1 ft | 86.0 ft | 39.1 ft | 7.7 ft | 3 PW300 | 19206 lbf | 70,000 lb | 5,760 nmi | 454 kn | 5.13 lb |
| Gulfstream G600 | 16–19 | 96.1 ft | 94.1 ft | 45.2 ft | 7.6 ft | 2 PW815 | 31360 lbf | 94,600 lb | 6,518 nmi | 481 kn | 5.97 lb |
| Falcon 8X | 12–19 | 80.3 ft | 86.3 ft | 42.7 ft | 7.7 ft | 3 PW300 | 20166 lbf | 73,000 lb | 6,235 nmi | 453 kn | 5.17 lb |
| Gulfstream G550 | 16–19 | 96.4 ft | 93.5 ft | 42.6 ft | 7.3 ft | 2 BR710 | 30770 lbf | 91,000 lb | 6,708 nmi | 453 kn | 5.70 lb |
| Global 6000 | 13–19 | 99.4 ft | 94.0 ft | 43.3 ft | 7.9 ft | 2 BR710 | 29500 lbf | 99,500 lb | 6,124 nmi | 464 kn | 6.77 lb |
| Gulfstream G650ER | 16–19 | 99.8 ft | 99.6 ft | 46.8 ft | 8.2 ft | 2 BR725 | 33800 lbf | 103,600 lb | 7,437 nmi | 482 kn | 6.07 lb |
| Global 7500 | 17–19 | 111 ft | 104 ft | 54.4 ft | 8.0 ft | 2 GE Passport | 37840 lbf | 114,850 lb | 7,725 nmi | 475 kn | 6.28 lb |

=== VIP airliners ===
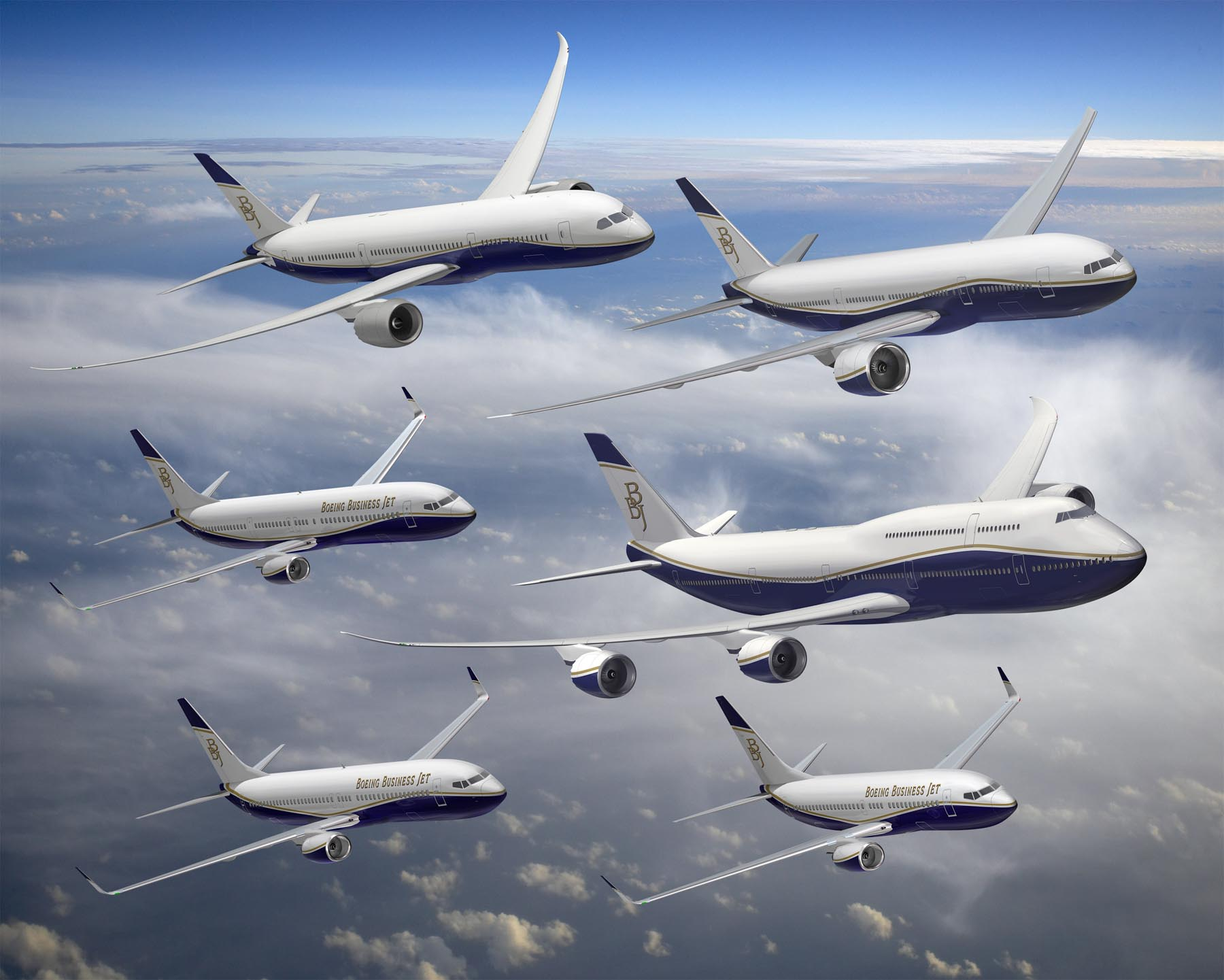
Boeing Business Jets are the most common 'bizliners'.

Business airliner can be contracted as bizliner. Airliners converted into business jets are used by sports teams or VIPs with a large entourage or press corps. Such airplanes can face operational restrictions based on runway length or local noise restrictions. They can be the most expensive type of private jet as they provide the greatest space and capabilities.

Aircraft of this class include:

- Airbus Corporate Jets
- Boeing Business Jet
- Embraer Lineage 1000

VIP Airliners, 8 pax mission
| Model | Pax | Length | Span | int. L | int. W | Engines | Thrust | MTOW | Range | Cruise | Fuel/nmi |
|---|---|---|---|---|---|---|---|---|---|---|---|
| Lineage 1000E | 13–19 | 118.9 ft | 94.2 ft | 84.3 ft | 8.8 ft | 2 CF34 | 37000 lb | 120,152 lb | 4,602 nmi | 446 kn | 9.61 lb (4.36 kg) |
| BBJ MAX-7 | 19-172 | 116.7 ft | 117.8 ft | 85.5 ft | 11.6 ft | 2 CFM LEAP | 58600 lb | 177,000 lb | 7,000 nmi | | |
| BBJ MAX-8 | 19-189 | 129.7 ft | 117.8 ft | 98.5 ft | 11.6 ft | 2 CFM LEAP | 58600 lb | 181,200 lb | 6,640 nmi | | |
| ACJ319 | 19-156 | 111.0 ft | 111.8 ft | 78.0 ft | 12.2 ft | 2 CFM56 | 54000 lb | 168,650 lb | 6,002 nmi | 442 kn | 10.92 lb (4.95 kg) |
| BBJ MAX-9 | 19–220 | 138.3 ft | 117.8 ft | 107.2 ft | 11.6 ft | 2 CFM LEAP | 58600 lb | 194,700 lb | 6,515 nmi | | |

== Environmental impact ==
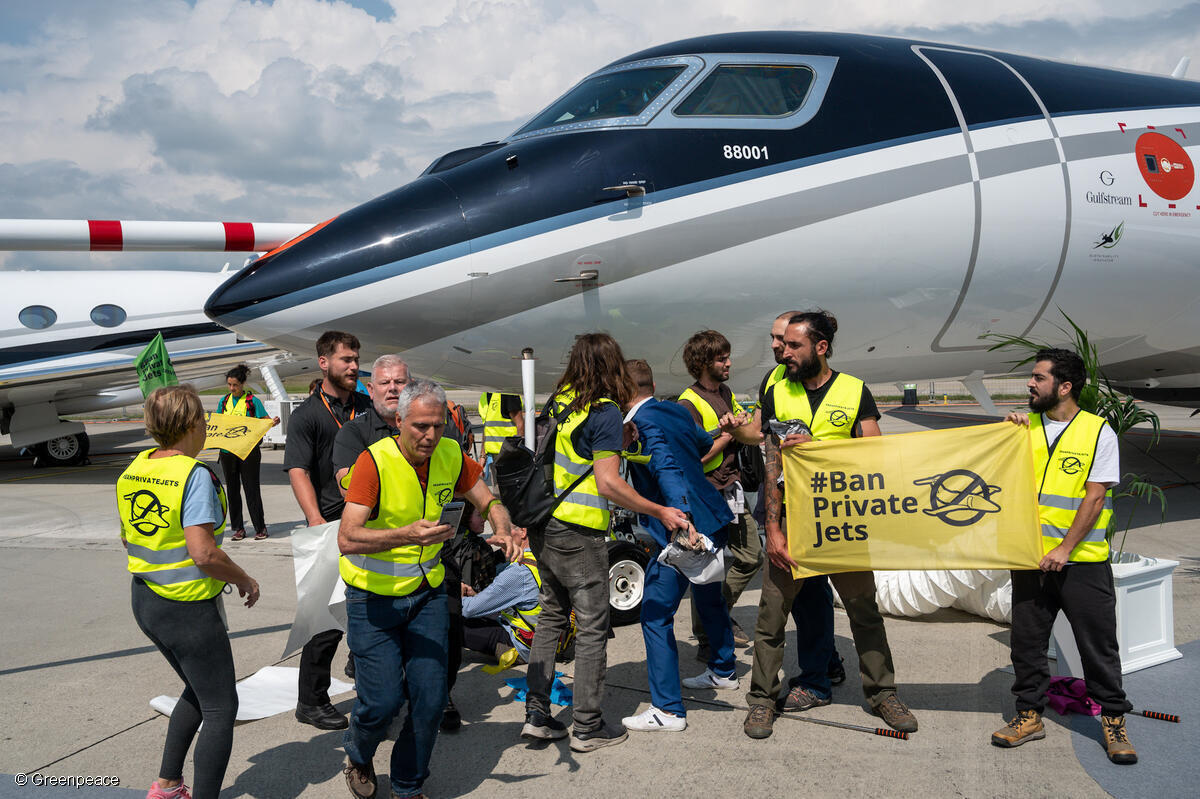
Demonstration against business jets (Switzerland, 2023)

Calculations suggest that people traveling in their own private jets leave a disproportionate carbon footprint relative to those who use commercial jetliners or other means of travel. Some individuals travel over 350,000 km (220,000 mi) annually, generating thousands of tons of CO_{2} emissions.

=== Tracking projects ===
As a reaction to the disproportionate emission of greenhouse gases by private jets, projects dedicated to tracking the movement of these airplanes in general, as well as the jets owned by specific celebrities, politicians, entrepreneurs and elite groups, have gained widespread attention by the internet public and the media. The programmer Jack Sweeney became known for his various social media accounts that track jets owned by individuals such as Taylor Swift, Elon Musk, Jeff Bezos, Mark Zuckerberg, Bill Gates, Donald Trump, and Drake.

== See also ==
- Very light jet – Class of small jet aircraft under 10,000 lb.
- Air transports of heads of state and government
- Supersonic business jet – Type of business jet
