= Morane-Saulnier MS.760 Paris =

Trainer aircraft in the French Navy

MS.760 Paris
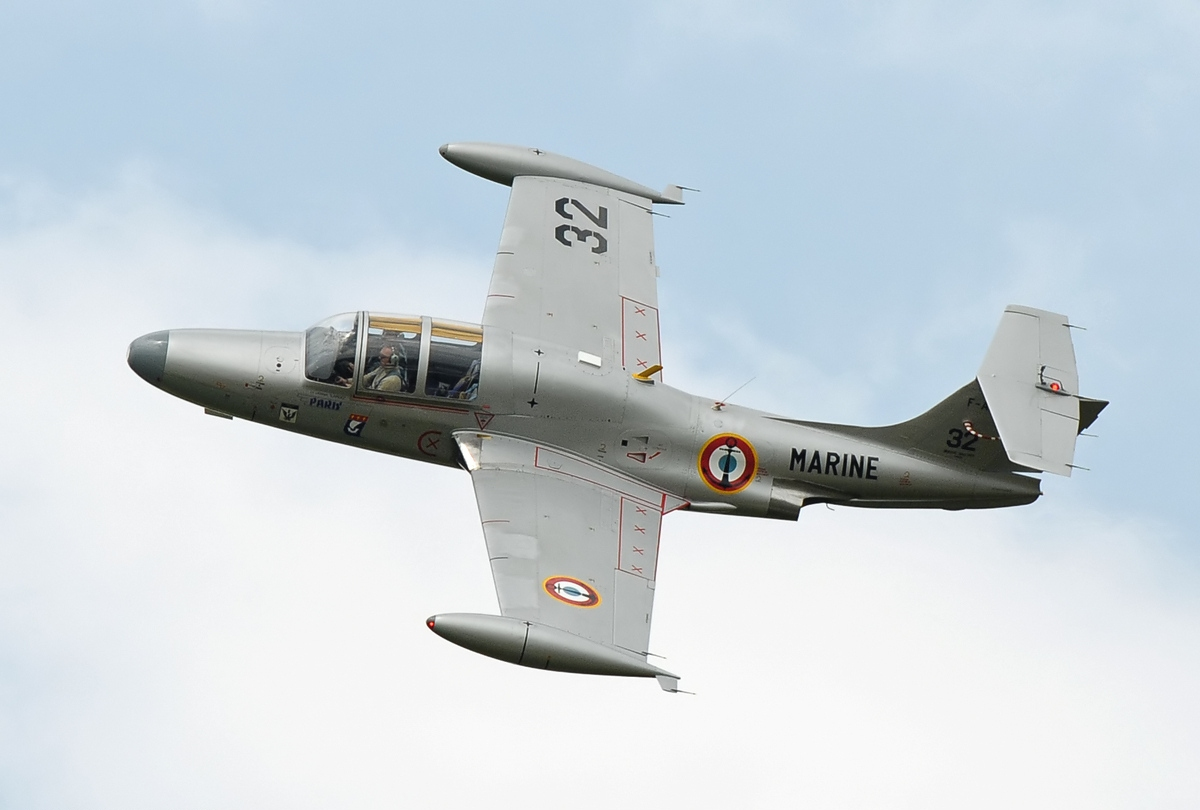
- A MS.760 over La Ferté-Alais, France

General information
- Type: Trainer aircraft
- National origin: France
- Manufacturer: Morane-Saulnier
- Primary users: French Navy French Air Force; Argentine Air Force
- Number built: 219

History
- Introduction date: 9 February 1959
- First flight: 29 July 1954
- Retired: 1997 (France); 2007 (Argentina)
- Developed from: Morane-Saulnier MS.755 Fleuret

The Morane-Saulnier MS.760 Paris is a French four-seat jet trainer and liaison aircraft designed and manufactured by Morane-Saulnier.

The Paris was based upon an earlier proposed trainer aircraft, the MS.755 Fleuret. Following the failure of the French Air Force to select the Fleuret, Morane-Saulnier opted to develop the design into a liaison aircraft and compact business jet. The primary difference between the two designs was the altered seating arrangement, the original side-by-side seating two-seat cockpit was modified to allow for the addition of another row of two seats to accommodate passengers. The Paris retained the flight characteristics of the Fleuret along with the option for installing armaments, which maintained its potential for use as a military trainer as well for civil aviation. On 29 July 1954, the prototype performed the type's maiden flight.

The primary operators of the Paris were the French air services, who used the type for liaison purposes between 1959 and 1997. During 1955, Morane-Saulnier and American aviation company Beech Aircraft formed a joint venture to market the Paris as the first business jet on the North American market, but the venture was dissolved a few years later due to a lack of customer interest. During the 1960s more advanced variants were developed such as the MS.760B Paris II and the six-seat MS.760C Paris III; the latter would not enter production however. While four-seat propeller planes are commonplace, jet-powered aircraft with this seating arrangement, such as the Grumman EA-6B Prowler combat aircraft, have remained comparatively rare.

== Design and development ==
=== Origins ===
The Paris has its origins within an earlier jet trainer aircraft developed by French aircraft manufacturer Morane-Saulnier. During the early 1950s, the French Air Force sought a jet trainer suitable to the ab-initio training sector; in response, Morane-Saulnier produced their own submission, designated as the MS.755 Fleuret. However, the military competition was ultimately won by another bid, which was produced in large numbers as the Fouga Magister. Shortly after this failure, Morane-Saulnier decided to embark upon a re-design of the MS.755 to allow it to function as a four-seat liaison aircraft instead; accordingly, the new aircraft was later given the designation of MS.760 Paris.

According to aerospace publication Flight International, the adaption from the earlier Fleuret to the Paris had been largely achieved via the elimination of the former's armament, the re-design of the cabin floor to remove the downward ejection hatch arrangement, and the repositioning of the cabin's rear bulkhead slightly aft. To avoid a reduction of the aircraft's available fuel tankage as a result of the latter change, the tank was re-profiled in other areas to expand it. In spite of these changes, the Paris still retained the favourable flying characteristics and did not entirely foreclose its use as a trainer aircraft.

The Paris differed from the majority of liaison aircraft then in service by its use of jet propulsion, instead of a turboprop or piston engine. According to M. Vichou, the head of the design department of Morane-Saulnier, the decision to adopt a pair of Turbomeca Marboré jet engines had been determined to be the superior option available; studies found that a single turboprop engine capable of providing at least 2,000 hp was necessary to produce a comparable performance, which would have resulted in the additional complications of appropriately accommodating a fairly large propeller in the design. Another alternative in using a pair of small turboprop engines was also less convenient than the Marboré engine, which could be positioned relatively low down in the airframe near the aircraft's centre-line.

The all-up weight of the Paris, including a payload of four passengers and 30 kg (66 lb) of baggage, was 3,397 kg (7,470 lb) and its maximum flight speed was 650 km/h (400 mph). According to the manufacturer, it was able to ascend to an altitude of 7,000m (22,900ft) in 18 minutes; at this altitude and at maximum continuous thrust, the aircraft had a flight endurance of 2 hours 45 minutes and a maximum range of 930 miles. In terms of fuel, the main fuselage tank contained up to 1,000 litres (220 gal), while a further 250 litres (55 gal) could be accommodated in each tip-tank. A feature that was intended to be used in emergency situations was the provisioning of the tip-tanks with electrically actuated valves, which enabled the rapid dumping of any remaining fuel. Actuation of the flaps, dive-brake and undercarriage was provided using electric motors delivering power via flexible shafts and Lear electric motors. The nose of the Paris contained much of the avionics and electrical systems, including the radio, alternators, batteries and motors. Access to the engines was provided via a completely detachable tail unit; the wings could also be similarly detached without the necessity of removing the undercarriage. The sizable main canopy was a one-piece moulding, being 8 mm (0.3 lin) thick. For increased passenger comfort, the cabin was both fully pressurized and air-conditioned.

On 29 July 1954, the prototype MS.760, registered F-WGVO (F-BGVO), took off on its maiden flight. Various features of its design, such as its T-shaped vertical stabilizer, low wing, and two Turbomeca Marboré II 400 kg turbojets internally mounted side by side within the aft fuselage, led to the aircraft being largely characterized for its inherent stability during flight. The French military emerged as a crucial early customer for the Paris, ordering a large batch of 50 aircraft to perform liaison duties for both the French Air Force and the French Navy, replacing older types such as the Nord Noralpha and Nord Norécrin. The securing of this order allowed Morane-Saulnier to proceed with quantity production of the type. On 27 February 1958, the first production aircraft performed its first flight. Early aircraft were provided with a total of four seats, two in the front and two in the back, and a retractable tricycle landing gear.

=== Production ===
French MS.760 Paris, 1987

By the early 1960s, the main production focus of Morane-Saulnier firmly set on the Paris. According to Flight International, by May 1961, 100 aircraft had been completed and the type was being manufactured at a rate of four per month. At the same time, roughly 200 aircraft were reportedly on order; while the French Air Force was still the primary customer for the type, additional export sales arrangements had been achieved with ten separate foreign countries. Flight International also reported that Morane-Saulnier had come to two separate agreements to license manufacturing of the Paris to other companies.

As early as 1955, even prior to the Paris having entered into production, it was known that American manufacturer Beech Aircraft held considerable interest in the programme, and was reportedly considered options for producing the type in North America under licence from Morane-Saulnier. For a time, the Paris was the only twin-jet civil aircraft and there was no direct competitors available. In response to this interest, senior design staff at the French company spent considerable time in the United States during the development phase of the programme. Reportedly, by 1955, Beechcraft had requested that the Paris, installed with the latest model of the Marboré engine, be dispatched to North American to perform demonstration flights totalling 500 flight hours. Later that year, this demonstration was conducted, during which the aircraft visited several major cities across both the United States and Canada.

Detailed production plans were mooted by Beechcraft and Morane-Saulnier; one key difference of the projected American-built aircraft was the adoption of the US-built Teledyne CAE J69 engine, a licence-built development of the Marboré, to take the place of the French-built powerplants. Beechcraft led approaches to both the United States Navy and the Royal Canadian Air Force, offering the Paris to meet their requirements for a jet-propelled trainer aircraft. During January 1958, the company announced a price of $210,000 for a single US-built Paris, spare parts, maintenance tooling, and a training course to familiarise operators with tending to the needs of the relatively unfamiliar jet engine; this measure was due to relatively few private companies, let alone private operators, possessing any experience with jet propulsion. However, American sales of the Paris were not forthcoming, reportedly, only two sales were made during Beechcraft's tenure as the type's distributor; by early 1961, when Beechcraft chose to abandon all distribution activities involving the type, a number of more advanced business jets, such as the Lockheed JetStar and the North American Sabreliner, had become available and gained traction in the market.

During 1961, production commenced on an improved variant of the type, designated as the MS.760B Paris II, fitted with a pair of Marboré VI 480 kg engines, wingtip fuel tanks, air conditioning, and an enlarged luggage compartment. Following the bankruptcy of Morane-Saulnier in 1961, the company was acquired by aviation firm Potez, who continued development on work on the type for a time. On 24 February 1964, a six-passenger version, designated MS.760C Paris III, performed its first flight; however, there was ultimately no production of this variant. Production of the Paris II ceased, and production of the Paris III never started as hopes of a substantial order to support its launch went unfulfilled. During the type's production run, a total of 153 aircraft (of both Paris I and Paris II variants) were manufactured for several different operators, including the French Air Force, the French Navy, the Argentinian Air Force, and the Brazilian Air Force.

== Operational history ==
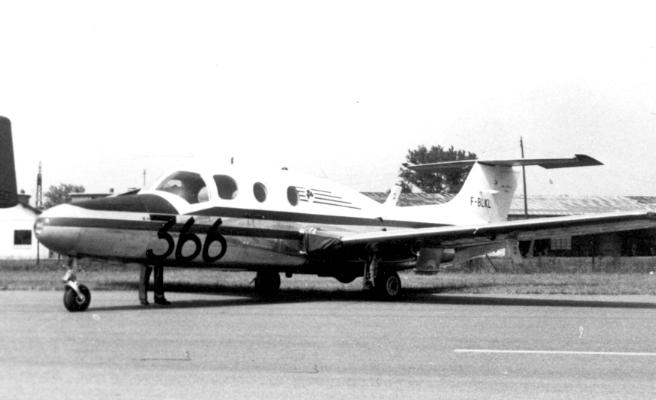
The sole MS.760C Paris III six-seat aircraft at the Paris Air Show in June 1967

On 18 July 1956, the French government requisitioned a batch of 50 aircraft, including 14 of which that were destined for the Navy, from Morane-Saulnier. The first plane was delivered on 9 February 1959 to Naval Air Station (N.A.S.) Dugny-Le Bourget, before going to the C.E.P.A. (directly translated as Aeronautical Practical Experiment Center - in English this would probably be "Flight Test Centre") in 1959–60, for the flight tests necessary to develop training programs and materials. The type was also purchased by several countries such as Brazil and Argentina; 36 planes were license-built by Fabrica Militar de Aviones (FMA) in Argentina. The MS.760B Paris II, with various systems improvements and integral fuel tanks in the leading edges of the wing, first flew on 12 December 1960.

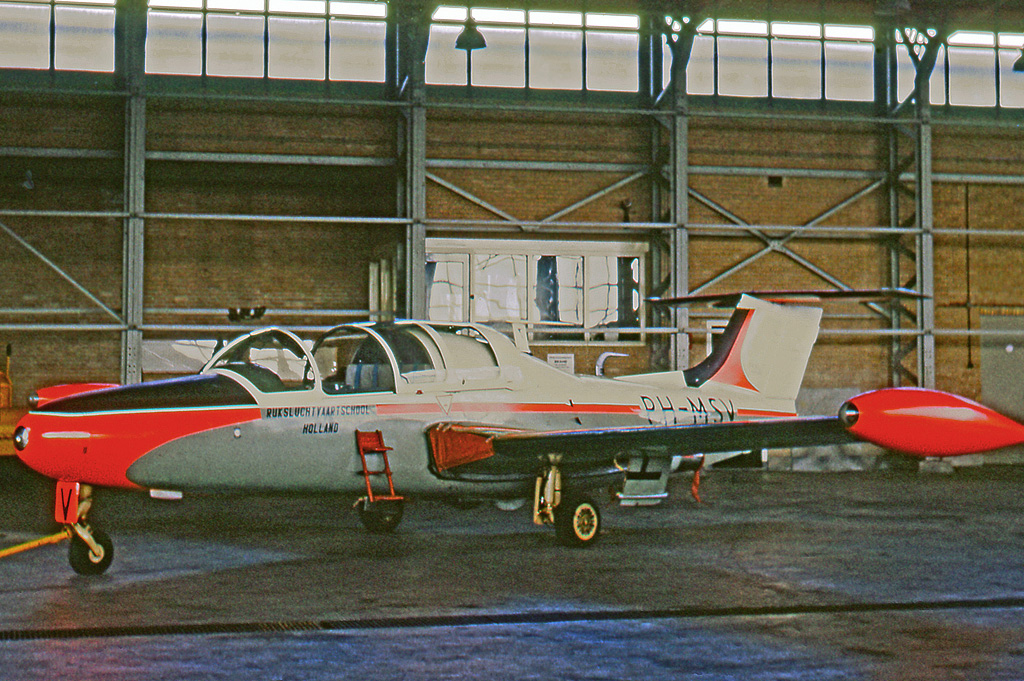
MS.760B of the Rijksluchtvaartschool at Groningen Airport in 1967

Between September 1962 and November 1974, a fleet of six MS.760Bs were flown on training duties by the Rijksluchtvaartschool based at Groningen Airport in the north of the Netherlands. From 1958 to the early 1970s, a single MS 760 was used as a flying classroom at the "College of Aeronautics" at Cranfield, United Kingdom; the aircraft was equipped to study stability and control together with performance as part of the MSc course.

The 14 MS.760 were assigned to Flight 11.S from 9 February 1959 onwards. The last plane, No. 88, was delivered on 27 July 1961. In 1965, MS.760 No. 48 was briefly assigned to Flight 3.S based at N.A.S Hyères. From 1970 onwards, all the 12 remaining MS.760s were assigned to Flight 2.S based at N.A.S. Lann-Bihoué. During May 1972, these aircraft were dispatched to the S.R.L. On 1 September 1981, this unit became Flight 57.S. Their missions were to provide various forms of training, such as Dassault Super Étendard and Vought F-8 Crusader pilot instrument flight rules (IFR) flight, all-weather flights, advanced training for new pilots, proficiency training for other pilots and A.L.P.A. (admirals commanding the carriers and Naval Aviation), and first and second Aerial Regions liaisons. Eight MS.760 Paris were on the unit's flightline. During October 1997, following 40 years of service, the aircraft were retired at Landivisiau Naval Air Station.

The MS.760s of the Argentine Air Force performed active combat operations during the suppression of the 1963 Argentine Navy Revolt, during which they were used to bomb a rebel-held radio station as well as the Punta Indio naval airfield, resulting in the destruction of several aircraft on the ground. During 2007, after 48 years of continuous service, the Argentine Air Force retired their last Paris.

During 2009, a private company, JetSet International Ltd, purchased in excess of 30 retired MS760s from the French and Argentinian governments, along with the acquisition of the type certificate, tooling, components, engineering plans and drawings from SOCATA, the successor company to Morane-Saulnier. The company reportedly had ambitions to refurbish existing airframes and to install current-generation jet engines and avionics for the purpose of selling them on to operators for approximately $550,000. That same year, a new two-ship aerial demonstration team, called Team MS760 Aerobatics, was formed, intending to use a pair of the refurbished aircraft.

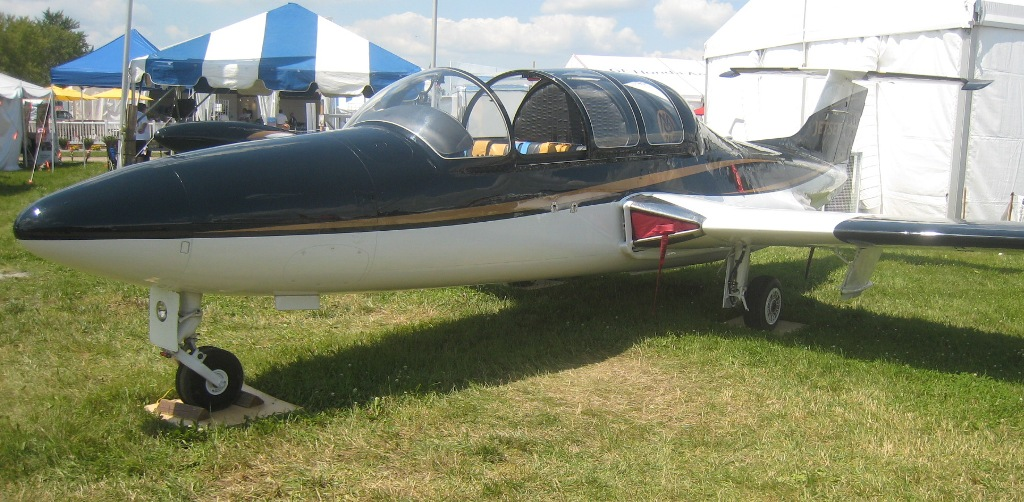
An updated MS.760 marketed for personal use

== Variants ==
- MS.760 Paris
- MS.760B Paris II
- MS.760C Paris III
- C-41: Brazilian Air Force designation of the MS.760A.

== Operators ==
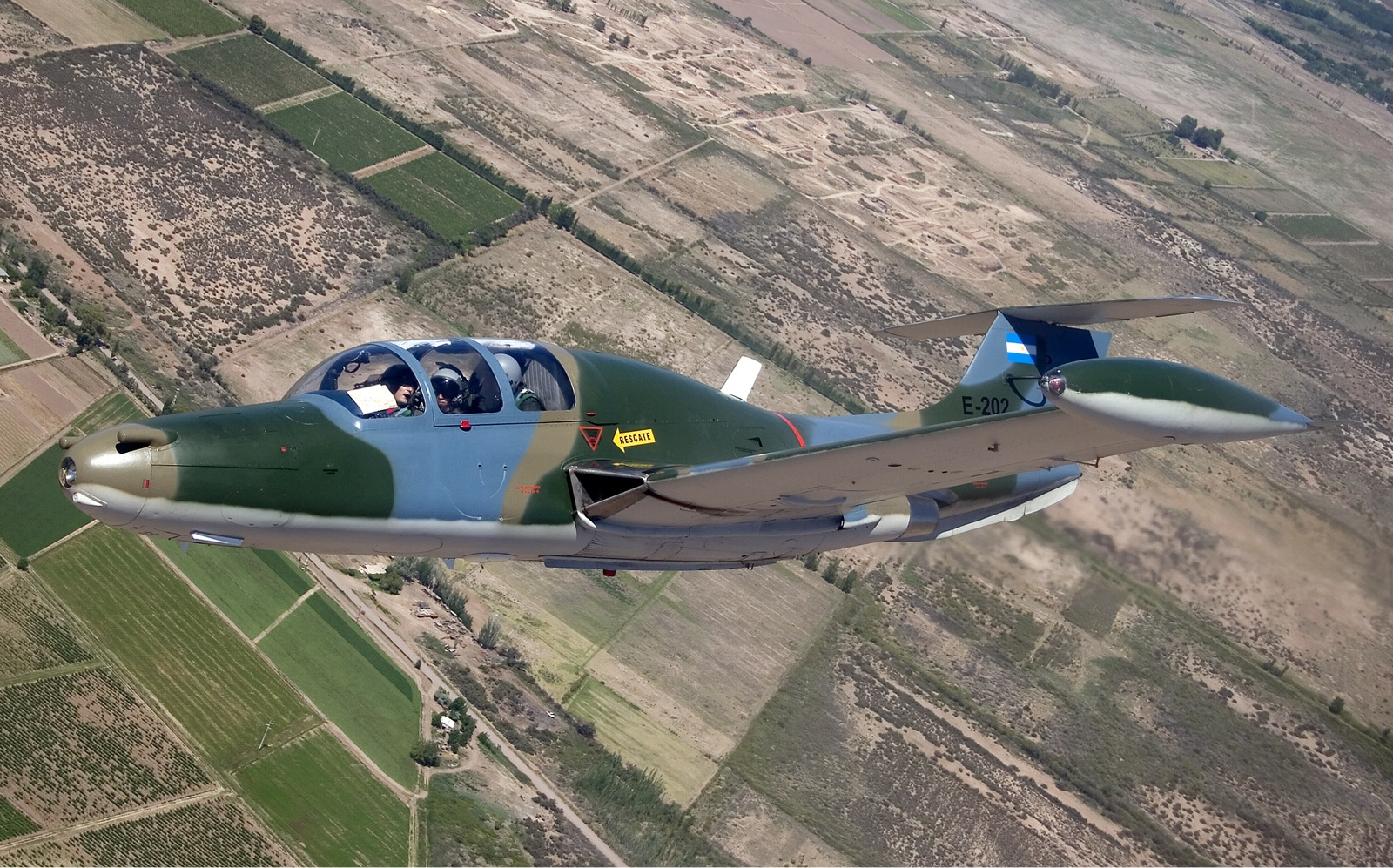
Argentinean MS.760 Paris in 2005

Argentina

- Argentine Air Force – 48, of which 36 were license-produced at Cordoba by FMA (c/n: 1A to 36A). Used between 1959 and 2007

Brazil

- Brazilian Air Force - 30 assembled locally. Used between 1960 and 1974.

France

- French Air Force
- French Army
- French Navy

== Specifications (MS.760 Paris I) ==
Data from Jane's All The World's Aircraft 1961–62

General characteristics

- Crew: 2
- Capacity: 2 passengers
- Length: 10.05 m (33 ft 0 in)
- Wingspan: 10.15 m (33 ft 4 in) (over tip tanks)
- Height: 2.60 m (8 ft 6 in)
- Wing area: 18.0 m^{2} (194 sq ft)
- Aspect ratio: 5.12:1
- Empty weight: 1,945 kg (4,288 lb)
- Gross weight: 3,470 kg (7,650 lb)
- Fuel capacity: 245 gallons in main tank, 115 gallons in wing tanks, 125 gallons in tip tanks.
- Powerplant: 2 × Turboméca Marboré II turbojets, 3.9 kN (880 lbf) thrust each

Performance

- Maximum speed: 650 km/h (400 mph, 350 kn) at sea level
- Cruise speed: 570 km/h (350 mph, 310 kn) at 5,000 m (16,000 ft)
- Range: 1,500 km (930 mi, 810 nmi) at 7,000 m (23,000 ft)
- Service ceiling: 10,000 m (33,000 ft)
- Rate of climb: 11.50 m/s (2,264 ft/min)
- Take-off run: 750 m (2,460 ft)

Armament

- Guns: Provision for 2× machine guns in nose
- Rockets: Racks for 4× 90 mm rockets
- Bombs: 2× 50 kg (110 lb) bombs

== See also ==
Related development

- Morane-Saulnier MS.755 Fleuret

Aircraft of comparable role, configuration, and era

- Fouga Magister
