= Morane-Saulnier MS.755 Fleuret =

French jet trainer aircraft

MS.755 Fleuret
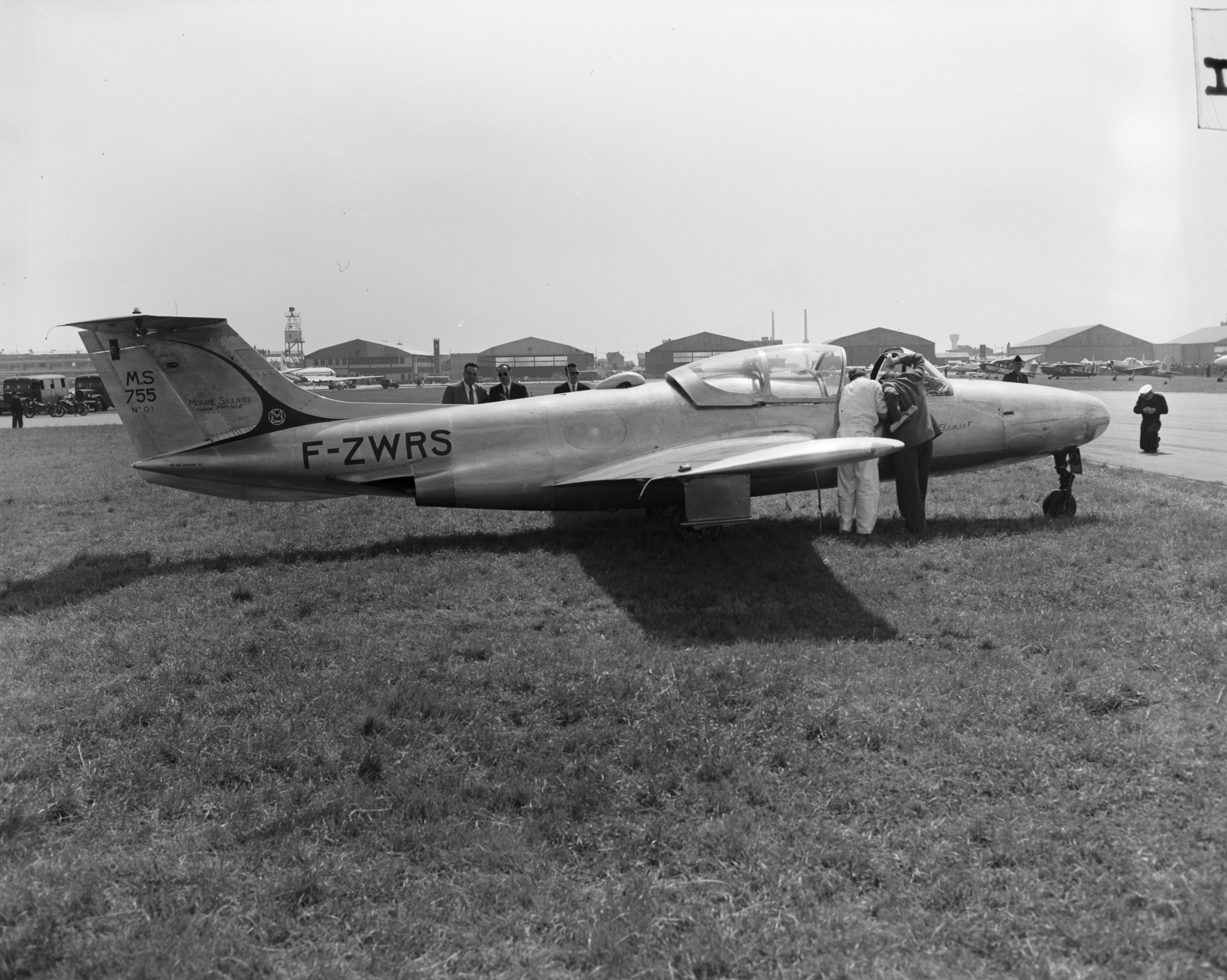
- MS.755 Fleuret prototype at 1953 Paris International Air Show

General information
- Type: Two-seat jet trainer
- National origin: France
- Manufacturer: Morane-Saulnier
- Number built: 1

History
- First flight: 29 January 1953
- Developed into: Morane-Saulnier MS.760 Paris

The Morane-Saulnier MS.755 Fleuret was a prototype French two-seat jet trainer designed and built by Morane-Saulnier. It failed to gain any orders but was developed into the larger four-seat MS.760 Paris.

== Development ==
The Fleuret was designed and built to compete in an order for the French Air Force for a two-seat jet trainer. It was a side-by-side low mid-wing cantilever monoplane with a T-tail and powered by two 800 lbf (3.6kn) Turbomeca Marboré II turbojets. The prototype with French test registration F-ZWRS first flew on 29 January 1953. The aircraft was not ordered with the Air Force buying the Fouga CM.170 Magister instead and only one Fleuret was built.

The Fleuret II an enlarged four-seat development was designed and produced as the MS.760 Paris.

=== Indian Air Force tests ===
In March 1954, the sole prototype MS.755 was disassembled, crated and shipped to Begumpet Air Force Station, India, for tropical weather and trainer-suitability trials with the Indian Air Force.

The audio memoirs of IAF Wing Commander Donald George Michael detail how Morane-Saulnier's Chief Test Pilot, Monsieur Jean Cliquet, and a team of 4 or 5 technicians accompanied the aircraft.

The assigned IAF senior pilots were impressed with the MS.755 as a trainer, and ran a series of flight instruction tests where low time students with only 10 hours total flying experience transitioned to the jet and soloed with no problems. This led to further tests where zero-time students were taught to fly on the MS.755, and later on the two-place DH Vampire.

During a flight early in the program, the two IAF senior pilots caused concern with Morane-Saulnier personnel when they pulled 8.5 Gs out of a dive. This was a significantly higher loading than the factory test pilots had reached. The engines were immediately replaced with spares and sent to France for analysis, but it was determined that no damage had taken place to either the engines or the airframe.

The IAF tests of the MS.755 ended in June 1954 and the aircraft was then crated and shipped back to France.

== Specifications ==
Data from Jane's All The World's Aircraft 1953–54

General characteristics

- Crew: 2
- Length: 9.70 m (31 ft 10 in)
- Wingspan: 9.56 m (31 ft 4 in)
- Height: 2.73 m (8 ft 11 in)
- Wing area: 18.0 m^{2} (194 sq ft)
- Aspect ratio: 5.12:1
- Empty weight: 1,905 kg (4,200 lb)
- Gross weight: 2,650 kg (5,842 lb)
- Max takeoff weight: 3,050 kg (6,724 lb)
- Fuel capacity: 680 L (180 US gal; 150 imp gal)
- Powerplant: 2 × Turbomeca Marboré II turbojets, 3.9 kN (880 lbf) thrust each

Performance

- Maximum speed: 720 km/h (450 mph, 390 kn) at 6,000 m (20,000 ft)
- Range: 725 km (450 mi, 391 nmi)
- Service ceiling: 12,000 m (39,000 ft)
- Rate of climb: 17.00 m/s (3,346 ft/min)
- Takeoff distance to 15 m (50 ft): 735 m (2,411 ft)

Armament

- Guns: 2× 7.5mm machine guns in nose
- Rockets: 4× 3.5 in (89 mm) rockets
- Bombs: 2× 50 kg (110 lb) bombs

== See also ==
Related development

- Morane-Saulnier MS.760 Paris

Aircraft of comparable role, configuration, and era

- Fouga CM.170 Magister

== Bibliography ==
- The Illustrated Encyclopedia of Aircraft (Part Work 1982–1985). Orbis Publishing.
- Bridgman, Leonard (1953). Jane's All The World's Aircraft 1953–54. London: Jane's All The World's Aircraft Publishing Company.
- Downey, John (1991). "First Generation". Air Enthusiast. No. 44. pp. 36–49. ISSN 0143-5450.
- Simpson, R.W. (1991). Airlife's General Aviation. England: Airlife Publishing. ISBN 1-85310-194-X.
