= Patrick Dovigi =

Canadian businessman

- Born: July 2, 1979 (age 47); Sault Ste. Marie, Ontario, Canada
- Education: Ryerson University
- Occupations: Businessman, entrepreneur
- Known for: Founder and Chief Executive Officer of Green For Life Environmental Inc. (GFL)

Patrick Dovigi is a Canadian former hockey goaltender, entrepreneur, businessman, founder, president, and chief executive officer of Canadian environmental services company Green For Life Environmental Inc. (GFL). Under Dovigi's leadership, GFL Environmental has grown to have a total enterprise value of $5.13 billion as of April 2018. In 2017, Dovigi's net worth was estimated at $1.08 billion. In 2018, GFL merged with Waste Industries, increasing Dovigi's net worth to more than $1 billion.

== Early life and education ==
Dovigi grew up in Sault Ste. Marie, Ontario. As a boy, Dovigi demonstrated a talent for hockey goaltending, an interest supported by his family. Dovigi attended Ryerson University in Toronto in 2000, studying business management at the school.

== Hockey career ==
Dovigi played minor league hockey in Canada, tending goal for the Ontario Hockey League (OHL)'s Erie Otters in parts of three seasons from 1996 to 1999. Dovigi also played as a goalie for Toronto's St. Michael's Majors in the team's 1998 to 1999 season.

In 1997, Dovigi followed his cousins into the National Hockey League (NHL) in Canada when he was drafted 41st as a goalie by the Edmonton Oilers in that year's entry draft. Although passionate about playing hockey, a teammate of Dovigi's recalls that, "We were thinking only about hockey. His [Dovigi's] mind was somewhere else".

== Early career ==
While playing minor league hockey, Dovigi began gaining business and entrepreneurial experience. From 1999 to 2002, Dovigi served as vice president of Right Lease, a construction equipment and automotive leasing company. In 2002, Dovigi gained exposure to corporate finance when he joined Brovi Investments. It was while working at Brovi Investments that Dovigi gained his first experience in waste management.

In 2004, a waste transfer station in Maple, Ontario suffered a fire. Brovi Investments had a mortgage on this waste transfer station and Dovigi was assigned to oversee the station's clean-up.

Dovigi then established a new company and worked with the municipality of Vaughan and the environment ministry for two years to return the operating license to the waste transfer station.

In 2004, Dovigi took a seat on the board of NGTV, otherwise known as "No Good TV", which was a YouTube music and celebrity channel and an organization chaired by Kiss bassist and vocalist Gene Simmons.

== Green For Life Environmental Inc. ==
In 2007, Dovigi founded Green For Life Environmental Inc. He would go on to acquire several local haulers, including National Waste Services. GFL later won a $186-million, nine-year contract to manage and collect the residential waste of 155,000 homes in the west end of Toronto.

In 2016, GFL gained an equity investment from Macquarie Infrastructure Partners, which raised the total value of GFL to roughly $2.4 billion.

In April 2018, GFL negotiated a recapitalization with BC Partners and the Ontario Teachers' Pension Plan at $5.125 billion. In October 2018, GFL merged with Waste Industries in a deal that valued Waste Industries at US$2.825 billion (approximately C$3.65 billion). The merger doubled GFL's presence in the United States.

In 2025, GFL negotiated a deal to sell its environmental services division, which was valued at $8 billion. In the same year, GFL subsidiary Green Infrastructure Partners was recapitalized by Energy Capital Partners at an enterprise value of $4.25 billion.

Dovigi continues to serve as GFL's president and chief executive officer.

== Recognition and community involvement ==
In 2017, Dovigi was named Entrepreneur of the Year in the Power & Utilities & Environment sector at the EY Entrepreneur of the Year Ontario Awards. In 2018, he appeared on the Canadian Business - Canada's Richest People 2018 list at #97 with a listed net worth of $1.08 billion.

In honour of his hometown, in 2018 Dovigi acquired naming rights for GFL for the home of the Soo Greyhounds from the city of Sault Ste. Marie. The arena will be called the GFL Memorial Gardens for the next 10 years. Also in 2018, Dovigi was elected to the Board of Directors of the Environmental Research & Education Foundation (EREF).

Dovigi has made financial donations to organizations that include Camp Oochigeas, Habitat for Humanity, Sunnybrook Foundation, The National Ballet of Canada.

In June 2019, Dovigi donated $5 million to fund a new sports medicine clinic, called The Dovigi Family Sports Medicine Clinic, which will be built in partnership with Sinai Health in Toronto.

== Other organizational work ==
Dovigi serves as a director on the board of directors for the Ontario Waste Management Association (OWMA).

== Personal life ==
Dovigi lives in Toronto with his wife, Fernanda, and five children and has a second home in Muskoka, Ontario.

In 2021, an entity tied to Dovigi purchased an apartment for $4.5 million on the 38th floor of 432 Park Avenue, a luxury development in New York City. In December 2022, Dovigi sold his Aspen, Colorado mansion for $55 million, after one year of ownership.

In May 2023, Dovigi purchased €330 million superyacht Ahpo from fellow Canadian billionaire Michael Lee-Chin. Upon his purchase, it was reported to be renamed to Lady Jorgia, but this renaming never took place. It made its first high-profile appearance since Dovigi's purchase at the 2023 Monaco Grand Prix. In 2025, Dovigi sold Ahpo and purchased Breakthrough (yacht), a 118.8-metre (389 ft 9 in) yacht originally commissioned by Bill Gates.

In December 2025, Dovigi became the first customer in the world to take delivery of a Bombardier Global 8000–an ultra long-range business jet. He previously owned a Bombardier Global 7500 registered C-FPJD.
