= Lonnie Poole Golf Course =

Golf course in Raleigh, North Carolina, United States

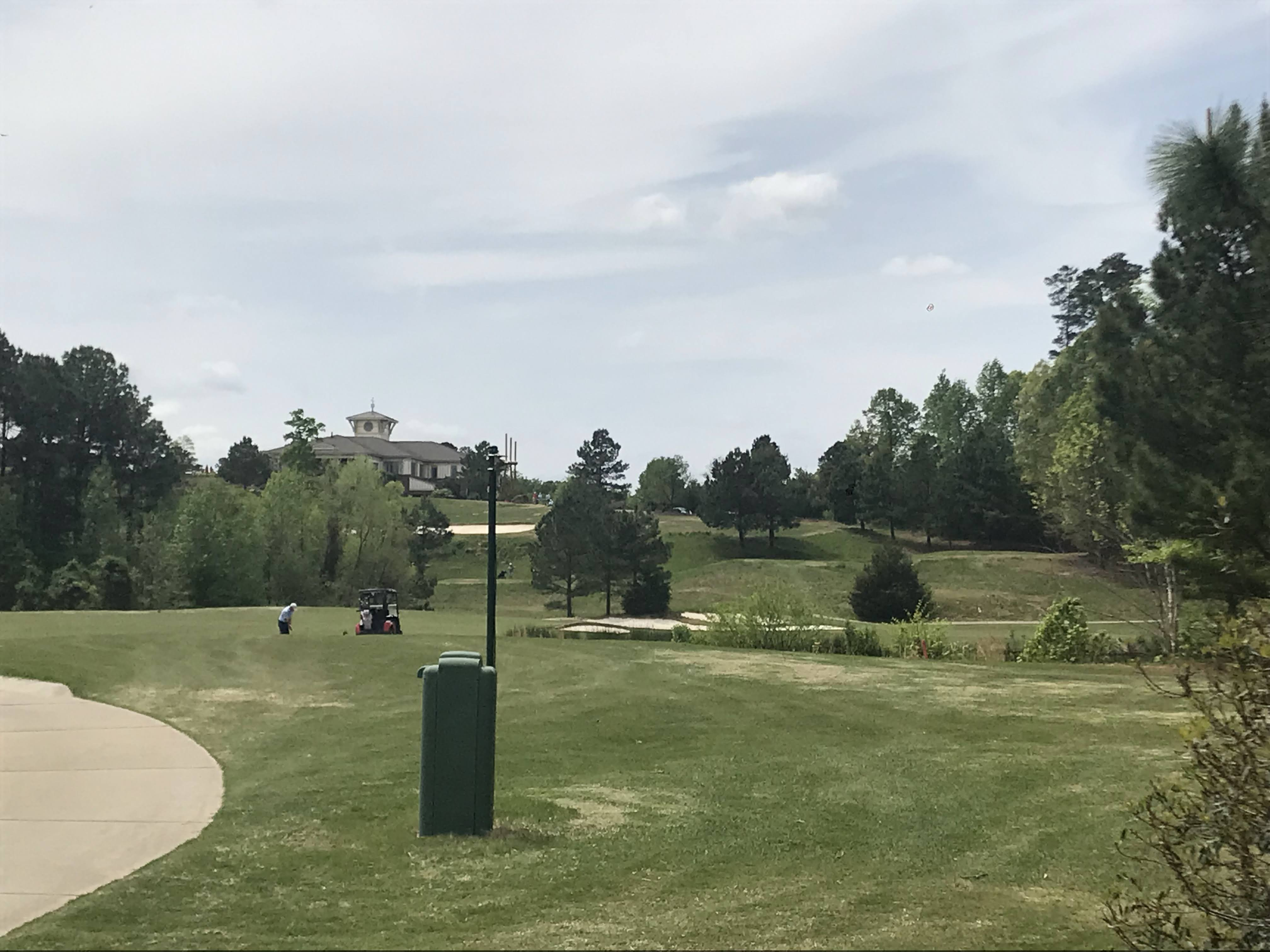

- Location within the United States Location within North Carolina
- 35.76015°N 78.67757°W

Club information
- Location: Raleigh, North Carolina
- Established: 2008
- Type: Public
- Owner: North Carolina State University
- Operator: North Carolina State University
- Tota holes: 18
- Website: Loonie Poole Golf Course
- Designed by: Arnold Palmer
- Par: 72
- Length: 7,358 yards (6,728 m)

Lonnie Poole Golf Course is an 18-hole public golf course located on the campus of North Carolina State University in Raleigh, North Carolina, United States.

== Development and funding ==
The Lonnie Poole Golf Course was designed by Arnold Palmer and the design team at Arnold Palmer Design Company. It was the only collegiate course ever designed by Arnold Palmer.

The course is named for Lonnie Poole Jr., NC State alum and founder of Waste Industries. Poole and his wife provided a naming gift to fund the golf course as well as a lead gift for the clubhouse construction. Other donors from the NC State community have also contributed to the development of the clubhouse and practice facilities, which was built solely on private donations.

== Operation ==
The purpose of the facility is to provide a public golf course on the Centennial Campus of NC State University that serves as a venue for the men's and women's golf teams. It also facilitates turfgrass and stormwater research associated with the College of Agriculture and Life Sciences (CALS). The golf course also serves as a teaching and training facility for the Professional Golf Management (PGM) Program in the College of Natural Resources.

== Recognition ==
The course has received a number of recognitions, notable ones include:

- Certified Silver Audubon International Sanctuary (1 of 2 certified college courses)
- 2009-10 Top 40 New Courses – Golfweek Magazine
- 2016-2019 Best Golf Course in Raleigh – Midtown Magazine
- 2016-2019 #1 Public Golf Course in Raleigh – NC Golf Panel
- 2019 #1 Public Course in the Triangle for Best Practice Facilities – NC Golf Panel
- 2019 Sustainability Award - NC Golf Owners Association
