= Glasgow Agreement =

- People’s Climate Commitment; Part of the climate movement
- Territories with organisations in the agreement
- Date: Signed November 2020
- Location: International
- Caused by: Political inaction against global warming and neocolonialism
- Goals: Climate change mitigation Climate Justice
- Methods: Civil Disobedience; Direct Action
- Status: Active

Number
- More than 160 organisations (30 April 2021)

The Glasgow Agreement is an international platform made up of various organisations which aim to coordinate themselves and use novel strategic tools in order to fight for climate justice.

== Scientific background ==
It is accepted by the vast majority of scientists that the greenhouse effect which warms the Earth is increased by the emission of vast amounts of greenhouse gases by human activities.

In a November 2019 statement published in an issue of BioScience, a group of over 11,000 scientists argued that describing global warming as a climate emergency or climate crisis was appropriate. The scientists stated that an "immense increase of scale in endeavor" is needed to conserve the biosphere, but noted "profoundly troubling signs" including sustained increases in livestock populations, meat production, tree cover loss, fossil fuel consumption, air transport, and CO_{2} emissions—concurrent with upward trends in climate impacts such as rising temperatures, global ice melt, and extreme weather.

Also in November 2019, an article published in Nature concluded that evidence from climate tipping points alone suggests that "we are in a state of planetary emergency". The Nature article referenced recent IPCC Special Reports (2018, 2019) suggesting individual tipping points could be exceeded with as little as 1—2 °C of global average warming (current warming is ~1 °C), with a global cascade of tipping points possible with greater warming.

== Strategic background ==
By taking into account the above mentioned climate urgency and the global institutional response which has not prevented the global rise of greenhouse gas emissions, the platform claims the most effective strategy to prevent climate breakdown to be that of large-scale direct action against the infrastructures responsible for said emissions.

Based on an inventory which will take into consideration the specific political conditions of each territory, their historical responsibilities, and infrastructures/sectors/companies, the organisations of the Glasgow Agreement that are located in a given territory claim they will develop priorities for emission cuts through a list of infrastructures to be shut down through different tactical tools (mainly those focused on direct action), such as civil disobedience, and politico-economic non-cooperation.

This climate agenda based on territorial inventories and climate justice demands aims to keep the Earth below 1.5 °C global warming by 2100 by reaching the emission cuts needed for that effect.

=== Climate justice ===
Is defined by the platform as a social and political framework and demand for the redistribution of power, knowledge and wellbeing, proposing a new notion of prosperity within natural limits and just resource distribution.

In this respect, some main points discussed in the agreement include:

- The recognition of the interdependence between all species and affirmation of the need to reduce, with an aim to eliminate, the production of greenhouse gases and associated local pollutants
- The acknowledgement and integration of the care economy into daily life
- Support for structural changes in society in regards to systemic racism, colonialism and imperialism
- A defense for a just transition for workers currently employed in the sectors that need to be dismantled
- A rejection of green capitalism as a viable framework for change

== See also ==
- Ecologists in Action
- Stay Grounded
- Extinction Rebellion
- School strike for climate
- Rising Tide UK
- Greenpeace
