= Ahpo =

Yacht, manufactured in 2018 by Lürssen

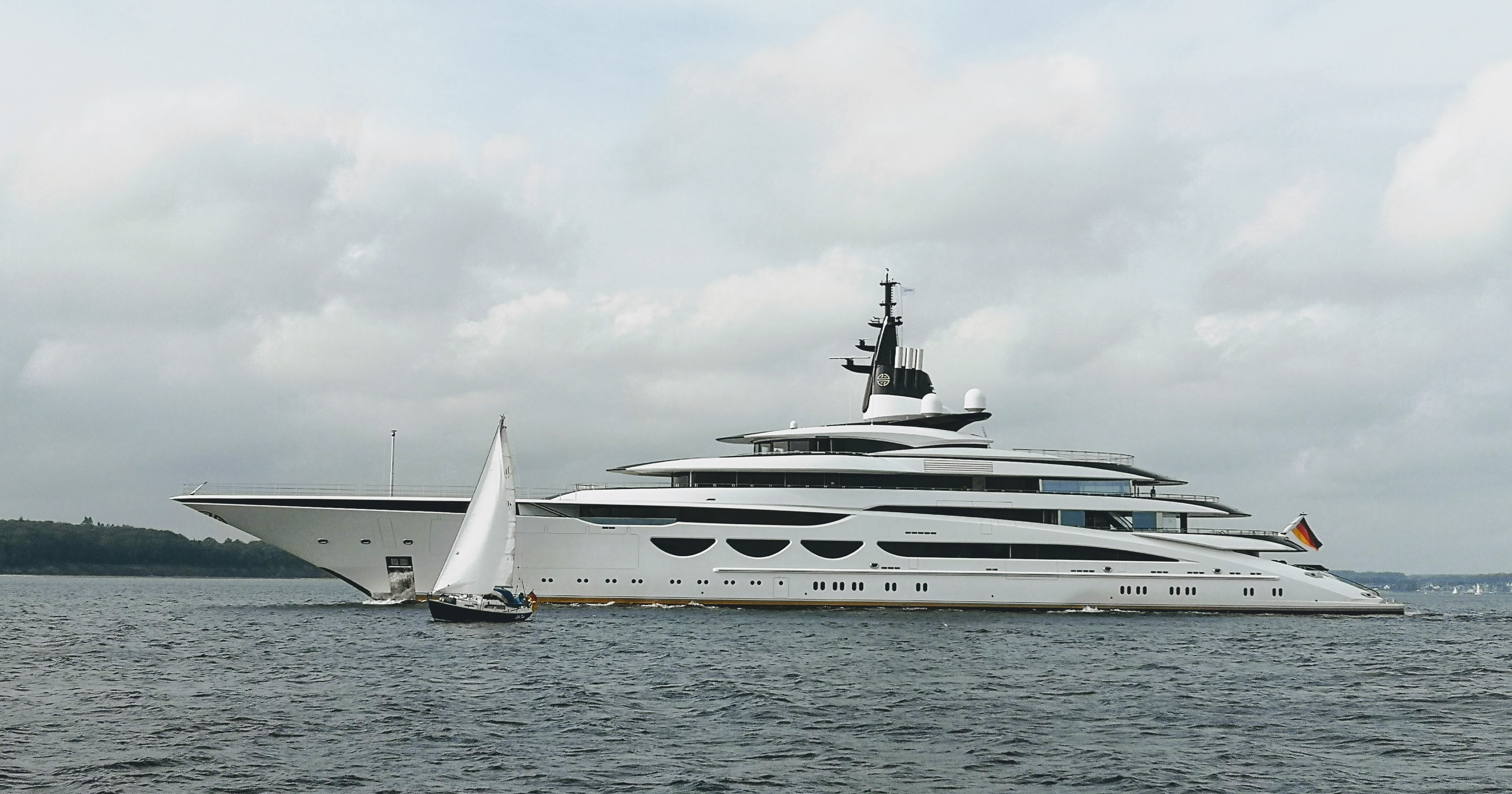

History

Marshall Islands
- Name: Ahpo
- Owner: Dmitry Bukhman
- Builder: Lürssen
- Launched: 18 June 2021
- In service: 2021
- Identification: IMO number: 9855276; MMSI number: 538071653; Callsign: V7A5010

General characteristics
- Class & type: Motor yacht
- Tonnage: 5,257 GT
- Length: 115.10 m (377.6 ft)
- Beam: 18.21 m (59.7 ft)
- Draught: 4.30 m (14.1 ft)
- Propulsion: 2x 4,351hp MTU (20V 4000 M73L) diesel engines
- Speed: 18 knots (33 km/h) (maximum); 12 knots (22 km/h) (cruising)
- Range: 8,500 nmi (15,700 km) at 12 knots (22 km/h)
- Capacity: 16 passengers
- Crew: 36

Ahpo is a 115.10 m (377.6 ft) superyacht built by Lürssen.

== History ==
Developed using the code name Project Enzo, the yacht's construction was overseen by Moran Yacht & Ship's build management team, and it was launched at Lürssen's yard near Rendsburg in 2021 and delivered later that same year to Canadian-Jamaican billionaire Michael Lee-Chin. Ahpo was built as a replacement for Lee-Chin's previous yacht, Quattroelle, which he sold in 2014. Ahpo was listed for sale in February 2023. Three months later, in May 2023, it was sold in-house by Moran Yacht & Ship for a rumoured €330 million, in what is "believed to be the biggest brokerage deal in history". It was sold to Canadian billionaire and former ice hockey goaltender Patrick Dovigi and was reportedly due to be renamed Lady Jorgia. It made its first appearance after its sale at the 2023 Monaco Grand Prix. However, Ahpo was never formally renamed to Lady Jorgia, retaining its Ahpo lettering on its port side bow and at the stern. In late 2025, Ahpo sold to Russian-Israeli billionaire Dmitry Bukhman for a reported US$360 million, giving Dovigi the funds to purchase Breakthrough (yacht) from Bill Gates.

== Design ==
Her length is 115.10 m (377.6 ft), beam is 18.21 m (59.7 ft) and she has a draught of 4.30 m (14.1 ft). Both exterior and interior designs are from Nuvolari Lenard. The hull is built out of steel while the superstructure is made out of aluminium with teak laid decks. The yacht is classed by Lloyd's Register and flagged in the Marshall Islands.

=== Amenities ===
Zero speed stabilizers, gym, elevator, swimming pool, movie theatre, piano, swimming platform, air conditioning, BBQ, beach club, spa room, sauna, hammam, underwater lights, beauty salon. There is also a helicopter landing pad on the bow.

==== Tenders ====
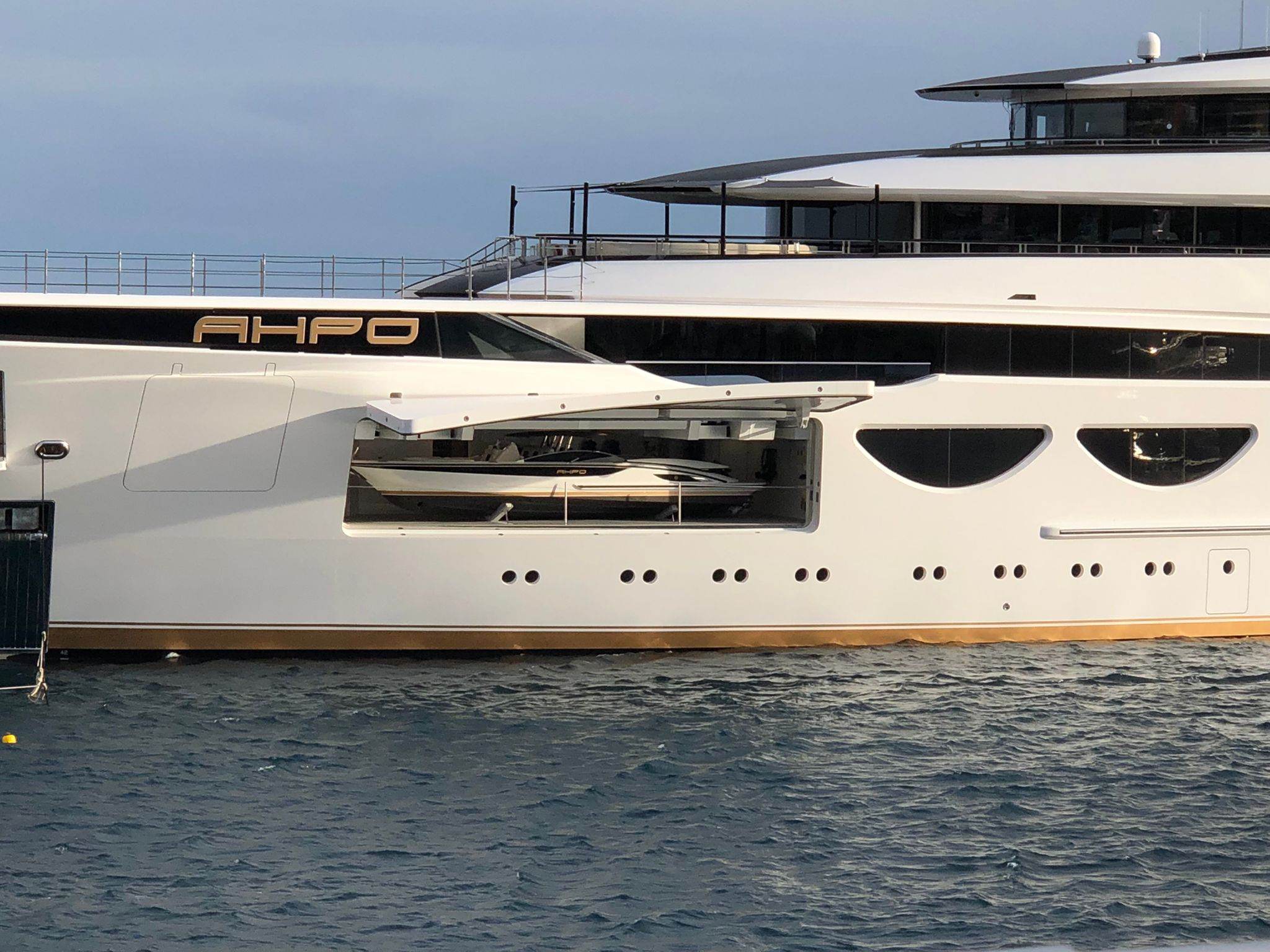
A view inside the tender garage during the 2022 Monaco Yacht Show

- Two 12 m (39 ft) tenders
- One Carbon Craft CC130
- Two Solas Rescue Boat

==== Recreational toys ====
Onboard the vessel, jet skis, seabobs, kayaks, Scuba sets, gear for water skiing and windsurfing, bikes and a sail boat are available.

=== Performance ===
Power is delivered by twin 4,351 hp MTU (20V 4000 M73L) diesel engines. The engines power two propellers, which give the ship to a top speed of 18 knots (33 km/h). At a cruising speed of 12 knots (22 km/h), the maximum range is 8,500 nmi (15,700 km).

== See also ==
- List of motor yachts by length
- List of yachts built by Lürssen
