= BBGA =

British aviation industry professional membership association

The British Business & General Aviation Association (BBGA) is a non-profit, professional trade association based in England in the United Kingdom (UK). It is the UK's national aviation trade body representing airlines, aircraft maintenance companies, brokers, and similar; operating and trading in the General Aviation (GA) and Business Aviation sectors, primarily in the UK.

== History ==
The association was originally incorporated in England and Wales on 28 April 1975, as the General Aviation Manufacturers & Traders Association Limited (GAMTA), which was based at Brill near Aylesbury in Buckinghamshire, England.

It subsequently merged in August 2004 with the Business Aviation Users Association (BAUA), whose Chief Executive was Derek Leggett, then John Batty from June 2003, which was based in Farnborough in Hampshire. Mark Wilson became CEO of the merged organisation.

The BAUA was mostly concerned with technical requirements for aircraft.

== Aims ==
BBGA aims to create an environment that fosters business aviation in the UK and around the world, and its member companies span all facets of the business aviation sector.

== Structure ==
BBGA is currently headed by its chairman Aoife O' Sullivan, and CEO Marc Bailey. It represents about 180 companies, including airports, corporate flight departments, and aircraft manufacturers. The organisation is based in Dorton, Aylesbury, Bucks.

== See also ==
- European Business Aviation Association (EBAA)
- Joint Aviation Authorities (JAA)
