= AvWest =

Charter airline based in Perth, Western Australia

- Founded: 1980s
- Hubs: Perth Airport
- Fleet size: 6
- Headquarters: Perth Airport, Perth, Western Australia
- Website: www.avwest.biz

AvWest is a charter airline and fixed-base operator based at Perth Jet Centre in Perth, Western Australia It was founded in the late 1980s.

== Operations ==
AvWest operates from the Perth Jet Centre, which the company owns at the Perth Airport. The airline operates mainly in Australia and can fly to international locations.

== Fleet ==
Current fleet:

- 2 Bombardier Global Express
- 1 AgustaWestland AW109
- 2 Bombardier Challenger 604
- 1 Cessna CE208
- 1 De Havilland Canada DHC-6-400 Twin Otter

4 Bombardier Global 7000 and 2 Bombardier Global 8000 jets are on order.

Former fleet:

- G-IVSP Gulfstream Corporate Jet - 1
- Hawker 800 - 1
