= Poole College of Management =

Business school of the North Carolina State University in Raleigh, United States

Coordinates: 35.78853°N 78.67396°W

- Type: Public business school
- Established: 1992
- Parent institution: North Carolina State University
- Endowment: $37 million (2010)
- Dean: Frank A Buckless
- Undergraduates: 2,724 Undergraduate Students
- Postgraduates: 828 Graduate Students
- Location: Raleigh, North Carolina, United States
- Website: poole.ncsu.edu

The Poole College of Management is the business school of North Carolina State University in Raleigh, North Carolina, United States. The college, accredited by the AACSB in 2000, currently enrolls more than 3,500 students across its undergraduate and graduate academic programs. The college employs around 100 full-time faculty members across its four academic departments: Accounting, Business Management, Economics, and Management, Innovation and Entrepreneurship.

== History ==
The College of Management was established in 1992 to provide undergraduate and graduate management education. In 1993, Richard Lewis was named the college’s first full-time dean, and that same year, the Master of Accounting program was established. Jon Bartley took over as the college’s dean in 1999.

In 2000, the college was accredited by the AACSB, and in 2002, the Master of Business Administration degree was created. Ira Weiss became the college's third dean in 2004.

In 2007, the graduate programs in the College of Management were named the Jenkins Graduate School of Management in honor of Benjamin (Ben) P. Jenkins, III, vice-chairman and president of the General Bank at Wachovia Corporation (retired). At the time, the graduate programs consisted of the Master of Accounting, Master of Business Administration and Graduate Economics Program.

In 2010, Lonnie Poole, founder of Raleigh-based Waste Industries, and his wife Carol Johnson Poole, announced a generous gift to North Carolina State University. The gift included an endowment to support NC State's College of Management, now named the Lonnie C. Poole Jr. College of Management.

Steve and Judy Zelnak made a $4 million donation to the College in 2014. Part of that donation was the endowment of the dean's chair. Dean Ira Weiss, the college’s dean since 2004, was the first recipient of the endowed Chair.

In 2016, Ira Weiss announced she would step down as dean and planned to join the college's faculty.

Frank Buckless was named the college's fifth dean in May 2019, replacing Annette L. Ranft, who served as the college’s dean since 2016.

== Academic programs ==
The college delivers undergraduate and graduate programs, as well as non-degree business training through NC State Executive Education. The college offers undergraduate degrees in accounting, business administration, and economics. The Jenkins Graduate Programs offer a Master of Business Administration (MBA), Master of Accounting (MAC), Master of Management (MM), and Master's and Doctoral Degrees in Economics. The Jenkins MBA program is offered full-time, part-time evening and online.

== Industry engagement ==
The Poole College of Management at NC State University actively engages with industry and academia through its centers and initiatives.

== Centers and initiatives ==
- Business Analytics Initiative (BAI) - The BAI provides thought-leadership, educational support, and research around the use of artificial intelligence and business analytics in a wide variety of organizations.
- Supply Chain Resource Cooperative (SCRC) – The SCRC provides thought-leadership to the academic and business communities on the subject of supply chain management.
- Enterprise Risk Management Initiative (ERM) – The ERM Initiative provides thought-leadership to the academic and business communities on the subject of enterprise risk management.
- Entrepreneurship Collaborative (EC) – The EC focuses on developing students who create new entrepreneurship opportunities. This includes NC State Entrepreneurship Clinic, which integrates research, teaching and real world experience by providing a physical place where faculty, students, entrepreneurs and service providers go to teach, learn and build the next generation of business.
- Business Sustainability Collaborative (BSC) – The BSC focuses on connecting students, faculty, and the business community through sustainability knowledge.
- Consumer Innovation Collaborative (CIC) – The CIC focuses on building and facilitating academic-corporate partnerships to undertake consumer research in applied business contexts.
