= Lonnie Poole Jr. =

American businessman and philanthropist

- Born: 1937 (age 87–88); Raleigh, North Carolina, United States
- Occupation(s): Businessman and philanthropist
- Known for: Founder and former CEO of Waste Industries and largest gift to NC State
- Spouse: Carol Lynn Johnson Poole

Lonnie Poole Jr. is an American businessman and philanthropist who was the founder of Waste Industries, one of the largest waste and recycling companies in the Southeast United States with approximately 2 million service points. Poole is also known as the largest contributor of all time to North Carolina State University.

In February 2011, Lonnie Poole was listed by The Chronicle of Philanthropy as number 27 on a list of philanthropic individuals in 2010.

== Early years and education ==
Lonnie C. Poole Jr. graduated from North Carolina State University (NC State) in 1959. Shortly after graduation, he moved to Ohio to become an engineer, but he longed for his opportunity to move back to Raleigh.

== Waste Industries ==
The initial idea of Waste Industries stemmed from market research Poole conducted while developing a concept for a new landfill compactor. The compactor idea failed, but Poole soon discovered his passion and moved back to Raleigh, North Carolina and launched Waste Industries in 1970.

After a few years of stagnation, the company grew in the 1970s and quickly expanded past Wake County and the city of Raleigh. By 1980, the company had reached 10 million dollars in revenue. Soon thereafter, Jim Perry, their first employee (hired in 1971), was named president and chief operating officer.

The company experienced rapid growth, surpassing revenue of $600 million. It was later managed by Lonnie's son Ven Poole. Lonnie Poole served as the firm's CEO from its creation in 1970 until 2002. He served as chairman of the board of directors from 1970 until 2008 and remains on the company's board.

== NC State donation ==
As Poole successfully grew Waste Industries, he decided to give back to the college that helped make him the person he is today. In 2010, Poole contributed $40 million to the school, with $37 million designated for the College of Management, which was established in 1992.

Shortly after the donation, NC State renamed the school The Lonnie C. Poole College of Management. To acknowledge Poole's gift, a permanent wall display now honors the college's benefactor.

The gift included $2.5 million to fund The Carol Johnson Poole Club House at the NC State Lonnie Poole Golf Course, which was named for Poole who provided a naming gift for the course in 2007.

== Other Philanthropy ==
In addition to being a major supporter to NC State, Poole's charitable causes extend to other organizations. For instance, through his affiliation with Epic Flight Academy, Poole supports Boy Scouts of America. As a boy, Poole earned the rank of Eagle Scout. A bronze statue of Poole stands near Lonnie Poole Gateway Village at the BSA's Summit Bechtel Reserve. In 2021, the Boy Scouts of America published a monograph titled Forks in the Road about Poole's life and lessons learned while in the Scouts.

Along with other industry leaders, Poole helped establish the Environmental Research & Education Foundation (EREF), a nonprofit organization whose stated purpose is "to advance scientific research and create educational pathways that enable innovation in sustainable waste management practices."

In 2021, the Lonnie & Carol Poole Family Foundation received the top Corporate Philanthropy Award in North Carolina.
