= Michael Lee-Chin =

Canadian businessman (born 1951)

The Honourable Michael Lee-Chin OJ OOnt
- Born: 3 January 1951 (age 75); Port Antonio, Portland, Colony of Jamaica
- Citizenship: Jamaica; Canada
- Education: McMaster University
- Occupations: Buisnessman, philanthropist
- Office: Chairman of NCB Financial Group (2002–present)
- Spouses: Vera (divorced); Sonya Lee-Chin
- Children: 5

Chinese name
- Chinese: 李振凯
Transcriptions
Standard Mandarin
- Hanyu Pinyin: Lǐ Zhènkǎi
Yue: Cantonese
- Jyutping: lei5zan3hoi2

Michael Lee-Chin OJ OOnt (born 3 January 1951) is a Jamaican-Canadian billionaire businessman, philanthropist and the chairman and CEO of Portland Holdings Inc, a privately held investment company in Ontario, Canada.

Lee-Chin was appointed to the Order of Ontario in 2017.

In 2016, Lee-Chin was appointed chairman of the government of Jamaica's Economic Growth Council (EGC).

Lee-Chin has made several large pledges and/or donations in Canada to the Royal Ontario Museum in 2003, the Rotman School of Management at the University of Toronto, McMaster University and the Joseph Brant Hospital Foundation. Lee-Chin served as chancellor of Wilfrid Laurier University.

== Early life ==
Lee-Chin was born in Port Antonio, Jamaica, in 1950 to Aston Lee and Hyacinth Gloria Chen. Both his parents were biracial African and Jamaican-Chinese. When Lee-Chin was seven years old, his mother, Hyacinth, married Vincent Chen who had a son from a previous relationship, and the couple had seven children together, six boys and one girl. Hyacinth sold Avon products and worked as a bookkeeper for various local firms, while his stepfather ran a local grocery store.

He attended the local high school, Titchfield High, between 1962 and 1969.

== Career ==
In 1965, Lee-Chin's first job came working as part of the landscaping team at the Frenchman's Cove Hotel. The next year, he got a summer job working on the Jamaica Queen cruise ship, cleaning the engine room.

In 1970, he went to Canada on a scholarship program sponsored by the Jamaican government to study Civil Engineering at McMaster University, and graduated in 1974. He financed his first year at university on his own but after that was able to attend on scholarship.

After graduating from McMaster, Lee-Chin worked briefly as a road engineer for the Jamaican government, but unable to find work in his qualified field (and allegedly, because his Canadian wife did not like living in Jamaica), he returned to Canada where he began graduate studies in business. At first he worked as a bouncer, but later found employment as a financial advisor for Investors Group.

Lee-Chin spent two years at the Investors Group, in the Hamilton, Ontario office and in 1979, moved to Regal Capital Planners and became regional manager. While at the company, in 1983, he secured a loan from the Continental Bank of Canada for C$500,000 to purchase a stake in Mackenzie Financial Group and formed Kicks Athletics with Andrew Gayle. By 1987, the investment was worth C$3.5 million.

In 1987, Lee-Chin took the proceeds from his Mackenzie investment to buy a Kitchener-based company called the Advantage Investment Council (a division of AIC Limited) for $200,000. At the time, the company had holdings of around C$800,000. He renamed the company AIC, and developed it to a fund that controlled around C$6 billion, with hundreds of thousands of investors. Following the acquisition of AIC Limited, Lee-Chin set up the Berkshire group of companies, comprising an investment planning arm, a securities dealership and an insurance operation. By 2007, Berkshire had amassed more than C$12 billion of assets under administration. In 2007, Manulife acquired Berkshire from Portland Holdings in exchange for shares, making Portland one of the largest shareholders of Manulife.

In 2009, Lee-Chin sold AIC Limited to Manulife for an undisclosed amount. The following year, Manulife rebranded the heritage AIC funds and eliminated the AIC name from the mutual fund line-up.

In addition to being the founder and Chairman of Portland Holdings Inc., Mr. Lee-Chin is chairman and director of Mandeville Holdings Inc. and Executive Chairman, CEO, and Portfolio Manager of Portland Investment Counsel Inc.

=== Investments 1990–2005 ===
In the late 1980s, AIC suffered from a collapse in the real estate market, in which it had invested. It recovered throughout the early 1990s by maintaining investments in large groups, such as Merrill Lynch and TD bank (Toronto Dominion). This caused investments to grow from US$8 million in 1990 to nearly US$8 billion by 1998.

Lee-Chin was reluctant to invest in the dotcom boom, and saw AIC investments lose 8 per cent in value, even as the S&P gained 56 per cent. Investors moved US$224 million out of AIC's flagship "Advantage Mutual Fund". The Globe and Mail ran an article predicting that even more investors would leave the fund, meaning that it would run out of cash and be forced to sell its core holdings. Lee-Chin's response was to sell stock in Coca-Cola, and invest US$65 million into Mackenzie Holdings (the same firm in which he had invested US$400,000 16 years previously). Letters were sent to all 350,000 investors, explaining the strategy. The investors were calmed by the purchase, and the stock was later sold to Investor Group (the same company Lee-Chin had worked for in the 1980s) at more than twice the price AIC had paid for it. In 2000 and 2001, following the dotcom crash, AIC outperformed the market with 26 per cent growth and 4 per cent decline respectively.

In November 2003, AIC was part of a regulatory investigation involving 105 Canadian mutual funds companies. In its review of AIC, investigators found no evidence of late trading and market timing activity by AIC staff. However, the Ontario Securities Commission (OSC) did find that over the 1999–2003 period, AIC permitted specific third party investors to engage in market timing trades in AIC Funds that generated profits of $127 million. In the Settlement Agreement between AIC and the OSC, the OSC stated that "Accordingly, the conduct of AIC in failing to protect fully the best interests of the Relevant Funds in respect of the frequent trading market timing was contrary to the public interest." As a result, in December 2004, AIC Limited was forced to return CAD $58.8 million to affected investors, which was the largest penalty imposed on any of the fund companies in the OSC investigation.

On 5 October 2006, Lee-Chin announced his resignation as CEO of AIC, to be replaced by Jonathan Wellum, AIC's chief investment officer.

In 2005, two investment product managers offering structured products joined the Portland Holdings portfolio, Copernican Capital Corporation has offered retail investment products, primarily sold by brokers, and has raised more than C$800 million, in 10 closed end funds since its launch. Markland Street Asset Management, which launched the Oil Sands Sector Fund, raised C$430 million in one of Canada's largest closed-end IPOs.

== Personal life ==
In 1974, he married Vera Lee-Chin, a Ukrainian Canadian whom he had met at university. They separated in 1997 and are now divorced. Vera Lee-Chin had contested the terms of the separation agreement, claiming that Lee-Chin did not disclose his actual wealth at the time of the separation. The couple had three children, Michael Jr., Paul, and Adrian.

Lee-Chin now lives with his wife Sonya Lee-Chin, with whom he has fraternal-twin daughters, Elizabeth and Maria, in Burlington, Ontario.

=== Wealth ===
Forbes first added Lee-Chin to its billionaires list in 2010. Since, his estimated net worth has fluctuated between $1 billion and $2 billion, with it pegged at $1.4 billion as of June 2023.

Lee-Chin is well known in Ontario, Canada as a prolific car collector, specifically of Ferraris. His collection includes a LaFerrari, Ferrari 599 GTO, Ferrari F12tdf, and Ferrari Enzo.

In 2021, Lee-Chin took delivery of a 115.10 m (377.6 ft) Lürssen superyacht named Ahpo, worth an estimated US$354 million (CA$474 million). During its construction, Ahpo was known as Project Enzo, paying tribute to Lee-Chin's love of Ferraris. In 2023, after just over one year of ownership, Lee-Chin sold Ahpo to fellow Canadian billionaire Patrick Dovigi, who was reported to have renamed the yacht to Lady Jorgia. However, as of 2025, this renaming ultimately never took place.

== Philanthropy ==
In 2003, he made headlines when he pledged to donate $30 million to the Royal Ontario Museum (ROM) of which a third had been paid as of 2015. He also provided a $10 million gift to the Rotman School of Management at the University of Toronto. The gift established the Michael Lee-Chin Family Institute for Corporate Citizenship at the Rotman School of Management, University of Toronto. The Lee-Chin Institute's purpose is to help current and future business leaders integrate corporate citizenship into business strategy and practices.

In September 2014, Lee-Chin and his family donated $10 million to the Joseph Brant Hospital Foundation.

Michael Lee-Chin and family received the 2015 Association of Fundraising Professionals' (Golden Horseshoe Chapter) National Philanthropy Award in the category of Outstanding Philanthropist.

== See also ==
- List of billionaires
