= European Business Aviation Association =

Non-profit organization

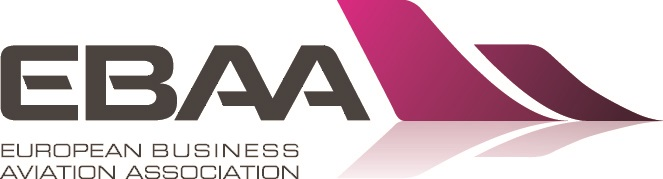
- Founded: 1977
- Type: Not-for-profit
- Headquarters: Brussels, Belgium
- Field: Air Transport
- Members: Over 700
- Key people: Chairman: Juergen Wiese; Secretary-General: Athar Husain Khan; COO: Robert Baltus
- Website: ebaa.org

European Business Aviation Association (abbr. EBAA) is a non-profit association based in Belgium founded in 1977. Its more than 700 member companies cover all aspects of the business aviation sector worldwide. The EBAA's aim is to promote excellence and professionalism among its members and to ensure that aviation is properly recognized as a vital sector of the European Economy. EBAA represents corporate operators, commercial operators, manufacturers, airports, fixed-base operators, and business aviation service providers.

== History ==
1977

Dr. Frits Philips of NV Philips and François Chavatte, head of IBM Flight Department in Europe, founded the International Business Aviation Association (Europe), set up in Eindhoven, the Netherlands, with 12 founding members.

1984

Recognizing that Brussels was the strategic place to be, the Association moved to Belgium and became known as the EBAA (European Business Aviation Association). Membership amounted at that time to 49.

2001

Together with its US partner, the National Business Aviation Association (NBAA), the EBAA launched the European Business Aviation Conference and Exhibition (EBACE). Membership for the first time hit the 100+ landmark, reaching 137 that year.

== Present ==
EBAA focuses on creating an environment that fosters business aviation in Europe and worldwide and is recognized as the leading entity representing business aviation in Europe. The Association is involved in regulatory discussions in the various EU institutions and especially with the European Commission, Council and Parliament, to communicate its position on regional and international regulations and issues affecting the business aviation industry in Europe. Such problems include the Single European Sky; environmental issues including emissions trading; the European Aviation Safety Agency (EASA) rulemaking process including fees & charges, security, and access to airports and airspace.

Other European national aviation associations represented by the EBAA include: GBAA (German Business Aviation Association), EBAA France, BBGA (British Business &General Aviation Association), EBAA Switzerland,

In cooperation with the American NBAA, EBAA hosts the annual European Business Aviation Conference & Exhibition (EBACE) convention, which has become Europe's largest Business Aviation trade show, and for several years has been held in Geneva, Switzerland, one of Europe's biggest hubs for business aviation traffic.

The association regularly produces Industry Surveys Studies and State Market Assessments.

EBAA is headed by Chairman Jürgen Wiese and Secretary-General Athar Husain Khan.

In 2007, upon a decade of robust, double-digit growth of the Business Aviation sector, EUROCONTROL recognised that the sector had reached for the first time 7.3% of all IFR movements in Europe. This prompted the European Commission to issue a Communication on the importance of Business Aviation for Europe and its economy, thereby formally recognizing the Association as the official voice of the sector in Europe. It was soon followed by a Resolution of the European Parliament in 2009.

Today, the Association is involved in regulatory discussions with the EU-27 Member States and with various European bodies, including in particular the European Aviation Safety Agency (EASA), EUROCONTROL, the European Commission, the Council and the European Parliament. Among others, it is involved in a vast range of aeropolitical issues affecting air transport and its members in particular, such as the Single European Sky (SESII), the Emissions Trading Scheme (EU ETS), Safety, Security, Flight Time Limitations, CORSIA and the access to ground infrastructure.

== Single European Sky ==
With the publication of "The Aviation Strategy" - as presented by the Commissioner in December 2015 - the EBAA published its positioning on the multiple issues tackled in the strategy.

Business Aviation is a vital part of the European aviation infrastructure, providing links between often remote communities not served by airlines, or any other direct means. It may carry only a fraction of the total number of yearly air passengers in Europe (around 3.5m pax/year) yet, with a fleet of 3,500 jet and turboprop aircraft it allows the connection of around 100,000 airport-pairs, three times more than low-cost and legacy carriers together

As a new strategy provides a great opportunity to start anew and remind all that all too often current legislation is not only ill-suited but also simply not applicable, the EBAA enumerated 16 areas where Business Aviation desperately needs major change and makes specific recommendations to facilitate early action:

1. Ownership & Control

Lift barrier of 49.9% of foreign O&C for non-scheduled carriers on an ad hoc, reciprocal basis with like-minded countries

2. Traffic Rights

Obtain mandate from EU MS to negotiate with third countries extra-bilateral rights and aim at opening up 5th, 6th, and 7th freedom rights for Business Aviation with like-minded countries, and dropping practice of non-objection

3. Slot Regulation

Modify the current revision of Regulation 95/93 to allow airports and national authorities to recognize grandfather rights where they have been established for both scheduled and non-scheduled operations

4. GPS-Based Approaches

Support the publication of Localizer Performance with Vertical Guidance (LPV) enabling CAT-I precision approaches at regional airports through SESAR and other means

5. Complex TMAs

Increasing capacity at congested airports: one solution is to improve access to satellite airports in complex TMAs

6. Capacity Increase at Major Hubs

- Promote trials at saturated hubs utilising steeper glideslopes for types of aircraft that have the capability but are currently constrained in access by vortex separation requirements.

7. CNS Infrastructure

- Extend ADS-B Out to all airspace users * Set sufficient frequency capacity suitable for Data link *Take due consideration of all PBN functionalities

8. Ground Handling

- Insist on a compelling revision of the Ground Handling Directive, and take into account the fact that liberalisation of the market should also be applied to BusAv ground handling

9. State Aids

- The new Guidelines on State aids at Regional Airports should allow full flexibility of public financing for airports of less than 1m pax/annum, as there should be no distortion of competition

10. A New, Lean and Efficient, Agency

- Extend the scope of EASA to other topics beyond drones
- Implement a real risk-based approach and recognise that Business Aviation, because of its nature and the size of its business, does not pose the same threat to the public and its passengers as airlines
- Learn more about, and recognise, standards created by the industry for the industry
- Consider sending EASA delegations to the second MS

11. Flight and Duty Time Limitation (FTL)

- Recognise the difference between the airline and BusAv pilot fatigue, and support work of NPA when finalised

12. Runway Performance

- Support work of RMT and conclusions in the corresponding NPA

13. Regulation 1254/2009

- Insist on wider and better implementation of the Regulation

14. Creating high-quality jobs in aviation

- EBAA will support the work of the EU network of aviation training institutes and would like to contribute by making a presentation on the findings of the report that it commissioned in 2015 on the shortage of skills, the reasons for this, and the recommendations

15. Aviation Big Data

- Consider the implementation of a minimum weight threshold for the deployment of “big data” as the use of current technology impacts smaller aircraft more than it does bigger ones

16. EU ETS

- There should be no distinction amongst EU ETS small operators in a future revision of the EU ETS

== Connections with National Associations ==
National aviation associations based in Europe, such as the ABAA (Austrian Business Aviation Association), BBGA (British & General Aviation Association), EBAA France, SBAA (Swiss Business Aviation Association), MBAA (Maltese Business Aviation Association) and the GBAA (German Business Aviation Association), are also members of the EBAA.

EBAA is a founding member of the International Business Aviation Council (IBAC), an international body representing the interests of national/regional Associations at ICAO in Montreal.

== Annual event: EBACE ==
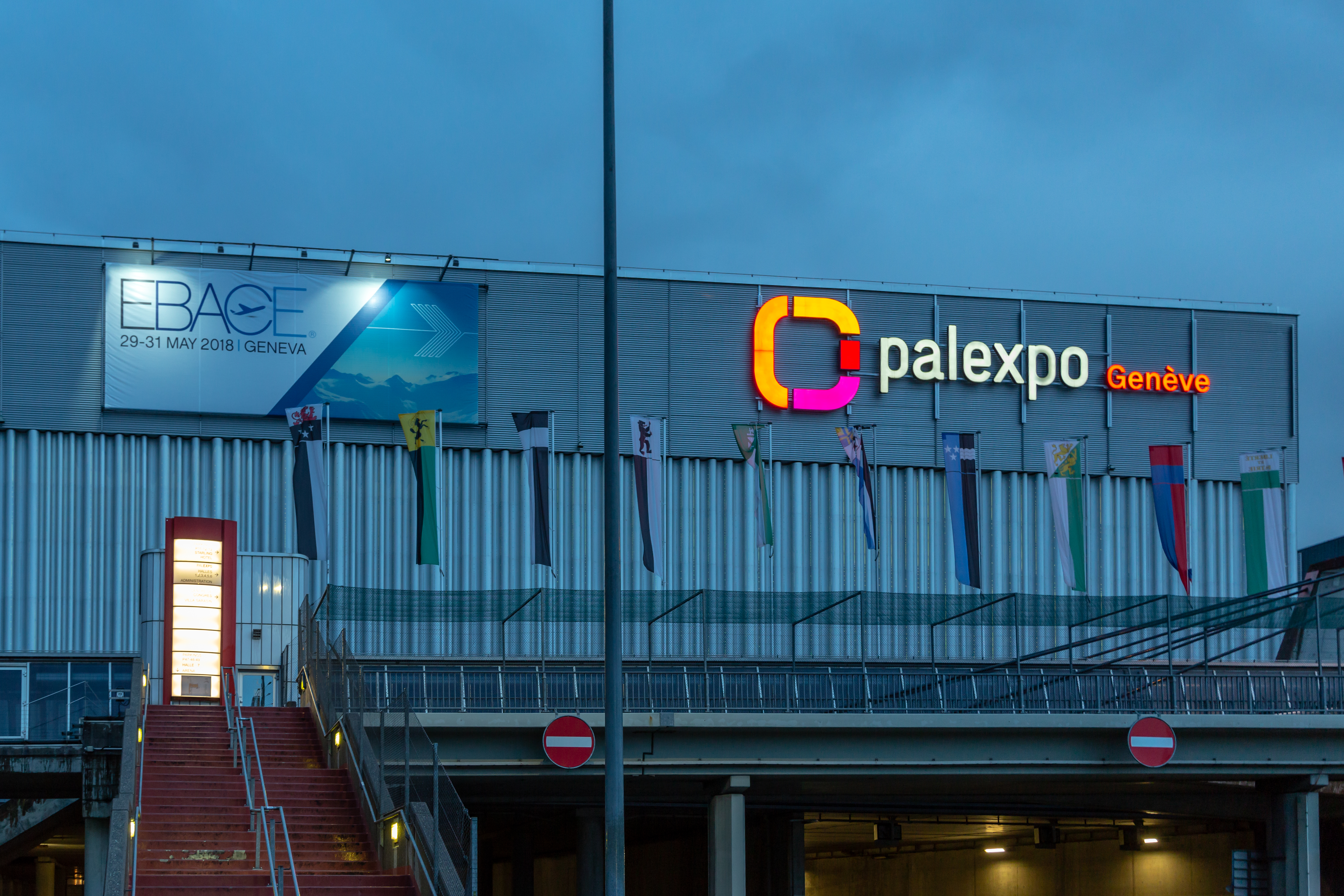
The 2018 edition was held in May at Geneva's Palexpo

Climate protest at EBACE 2023

Every year, the EBAA, together with its U.S. counterpart, the National Business Aviation Association, hosts the European Business Aviation Convention & Exhibition (EBACE). The trade show is the biggest annual event for the European business aviation community. The 2018 edition was held from Tuesday 29 May to Thursday 31 May at Geneva's Palexpo and brought together thousands of business leaders, government officials, manufacturers, flight department personnel, and others. In 2017 there were more than 12,000 visitors and 450 exhibitors and 60 aircraft were shown on the tarmac next to the convention center. Each year, education sessions are held with topics ranging from safety to advancing careers. EBACE also provides learning and networking opportunities for young professionals interested in business aviation.

At EBACE 2023, roughly one hundred protestors from Greenpeace, Stay Grounded, Extinction Rebellion and Scientist Rebellion chained themselves to airplanes to protest carbon emissions of private jets.

== Working groups and committees ==
The groups are made up of many volunteers who spontaneously share their expertise and skills. Each committee is specialized on an area of critical importance to the world of business aviation

Committees explore key issues, build connections, share best practice, and propose practical ways to enhance their discipline. They area primary resource for experts when addressing specific operational challenges.

The association has 11 working groups:

- Advocacy Committee
- Safety Committee - The committee communicates alterations to safety regulations to assist members in understanding and responding appropriately. The EBAA is also encouraging the most effective practices for all members, including approaches to reduce risk and initiatives that will enhance safety and security.
- S.T.A.R.S Committees - an initiative proposed by young professionals in the aviation industry dedicated to developing and promoting sustainability standards in the European business aviation industry as a whole. EBAA has a strong commitment to the use of Sustainable Aviation Fuel (SAF) and has partnered with the Business Aviation Coalition for Sustainable Aviation Fuel. The association considers SAF to be a viable and certified alternative to fossil fuels.
- AHGOC Committee (AMAC)
- Charter Brokers Committee (AMAC)
- Financiers Committee (AMAC)
- Aviation Lawyers Committee (AMAC)
- Maintenance Committee (AMAC)
- Risk Management Committee (AMAC)
- Sales and Acquisitions Committee (AMAC)
- Tech Committee (AMAC)
