= GFL Environmental =

Canadian waste management company

GFL Environmental Inc.
- Type: Public
- Traded as: TSX: GFL; NYSE: GFL; Russell 1000 component
- Industry: Waste management
- Founded: 2007; 19 years ago Vaughan, Ontario, Canada
- Headquarters: Miami Beach, Florida, US
- Area served: Canada; United States
- Key people: Patrick Dovigi, Founder, President and Chief Executive Officer; Jacob Diliberto, General Manager
- Revenue: ▲CA$7.516 billion (2023)
- Net income: ▲CA$32.2 million (2023)
- Total assets: ▲CA$19.879 billion (2023)
- Total equity: ▲CA$7.386 billion (2023)
- Number of employees: 20,000
- Website: gflenv.com

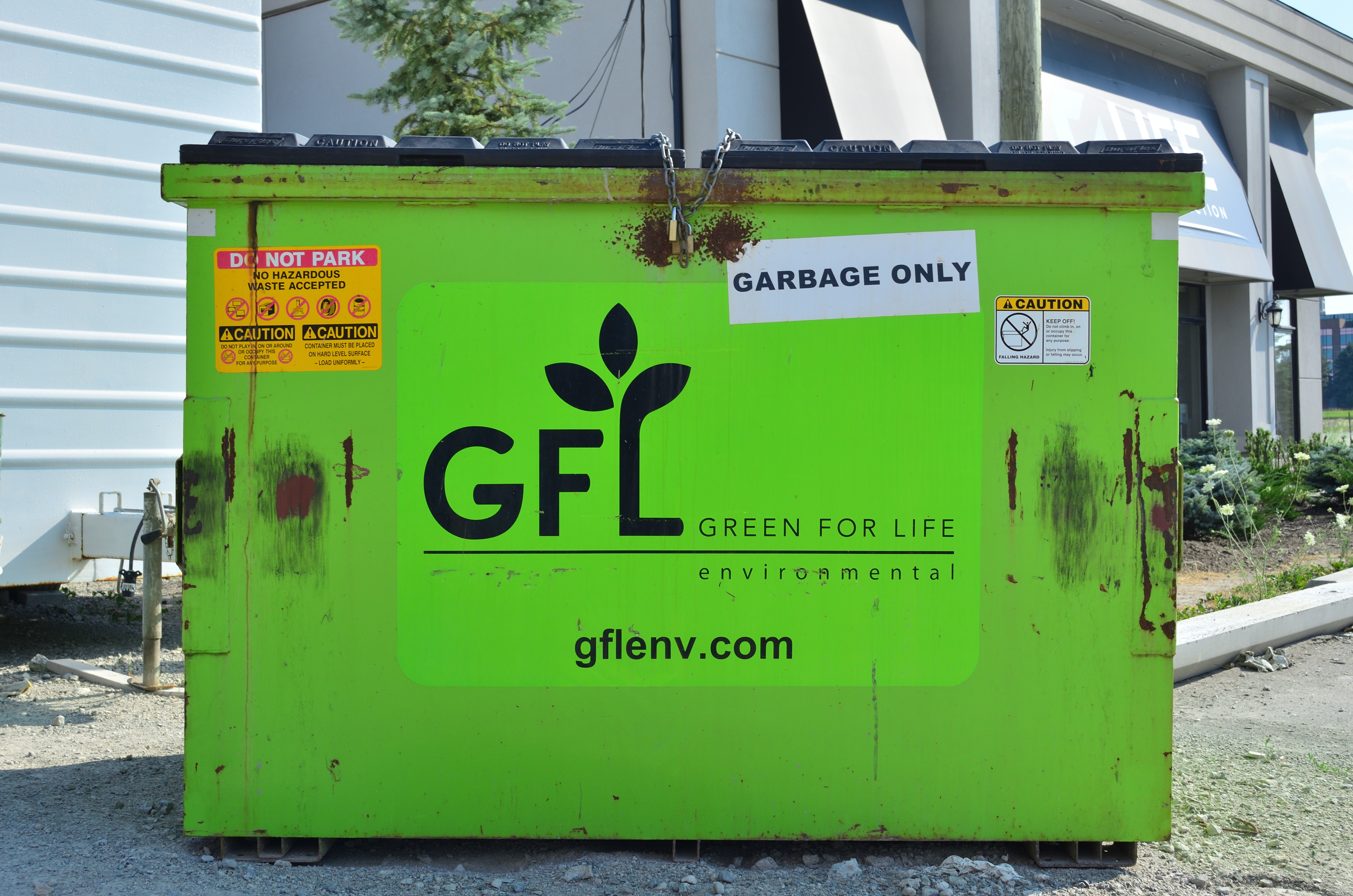
GFL Environmental waste bin

GFL Environmental Inc. (an initialism of Green For Life) is a Canadian international waste management company. Founded and still incorporated in Vaughan, Ontario, GFL operates throughout Canada and most of the United States, and currently employs more than 20,000 people. The company provides environmental services to municipal, residential, commercial, industrial and institutional customers.

== Company history ==
GFL Environmental Inc. was founded in 2007 by Canadian entrepreneur and businessman Patrick Dovigi, who had previous experience in the environmental services industry and wanted to establish a company to amalgamate smaller waste companies in Canada. The firm was originally established from the merger of several Ontario environmental services firms, including Direct Line Environmental, National Waste Services and Enviro West.

The same year that GFL was founded, the company gained the investment interest of Canaccord Genuity Corp. Three years later, in 2010, Roark Capital Group, an Atlanta private equity firm, made a $105 million investment in GFL.

GFL began to acquire environmental solution firms around Canada. In 2011, GFL acquired Turtle Island Recycling, a recycling company operating in Toronto.

In 2014, GFL acquired the waste collection business of Contrans Group Inc., giving the company a larger solid waste management presence in Edmonton and Slave Lake, Alberta. Also in 2014, GFL purchased the business operated by Waste Management in the provinces of Nova Scotia, New Brunswick, and Newfoundland and Labrador.

A reorganization of GFL's share capital was completed in late 2014. The reorganization saw Roark Capital Group, which had provided capital to GFL since 2010, selling its stake in the company.

In February 2016, GFL completed the acquisition of Services Matrec Inc. (Matrec), the waste management division of Montreal-based TransForce. The $800 million purchase represented GFL's largest acquisition in its company history and was supported by an equity investment of $458 million made by a fund managed by Macquarie Group and an additional investment provided by Highbridge Principal Strategies and other co-investors. The Matrec acquisition also represented GFL's entrance into the Quebec and eastern Ontario markets and increased GFL's total valuation to roughly $2.4 billion.

GFL expanded into the United States in September 2016, through the acquisition of Michigan-based Rizzo Environmental Services, which was merged with a new U.S. subsidiary of GFL. Rizzo had provided collection services to more than 40 municipalities in Southeast Michigan and northern Ohio. GFL purchased Rizzo Environmental around the same time that Rizzo's CEO, Chuck Rizzo, was indicted for bribery and wire fraud, among other charges.

On October 10, 2018, GFL announced it was going to buy American company, Waste Industries, for an undisclosed amount.

GFL, along with subsidiaries under its control, have faced a number of workplace safety and environmental issues. Environmental issues include the spill of 200,000 gallons of used oil by a subsidiary in Illinois; a $300,000 fine from violation of federal guidelines on the sale of tetrachloroethylene (the company and its CEO, Patrick Dovigi, were charged with violation of the Canadian Environmental Protection Act); and an injunction by a Cobb County, Georgia court halting the operation of a landfill. GFL has been sued by municipalities and farmers for its soil dumping practices.

In July 2019, GFL acquired Soil Safe, an American environmental services company headquartered in Columbia, Maryland that recycles contaminated soil into an engineered soil product that is used in a wide range of applications, including capping material, road base, structural fill, and general fill

In March 2020, the company held its initial public offering on the Toronto Stock Exchange, pricing shares at $19 each and raising $1.4 billion, giving the company as a whole a market value of $6.1 billion.

A 2020 report linked GFL executive Paul Borrelli with Antonio Borrelli, nephew of Toronto mobster Pietro Scarcella.

On August 12, 2020, GFL announced that it would acquire Houston, Texas-based WCA Waste Corporation from Australia-based Macquarie Infrastructure and Real Assets for $1.212 billion. The acquisition was completed on October 1, 2020, expanding GFL's U.S. footprint into 11 new states, with regional operations centered in Texas, Missouri, and Florida. WCA operated 22 operational sites, 37 collection and hauling facilities, 27 transfer stations, and over 1,000 collection trucks at the time of the acquisition.

In July 2021, GFL created the Resource Recovery Alliance (RRA) in response to the Government of Ontario's extended producer responsibility (EPR) regulation requiring product and packaging producers to operate and fully finance Ontario's blue box recycling system.

On August 17, 2021, GFL acquired solid waste business, Terrapure Environmental Ltd., and its subsidiaries for $743.8 million. The deal did not include Terrapure's battery recycling business.

In May 2022, the GFL acquired Sprint Waste Services, a solid waste company with assets in Texas and Louisiana.

On January 21, 2026, GFL moved its headquarters from Vaughan, Ontario, to Miami Beach, Florida to drive a broader shareholder base in the United States.

== Residential solid waste operations ==
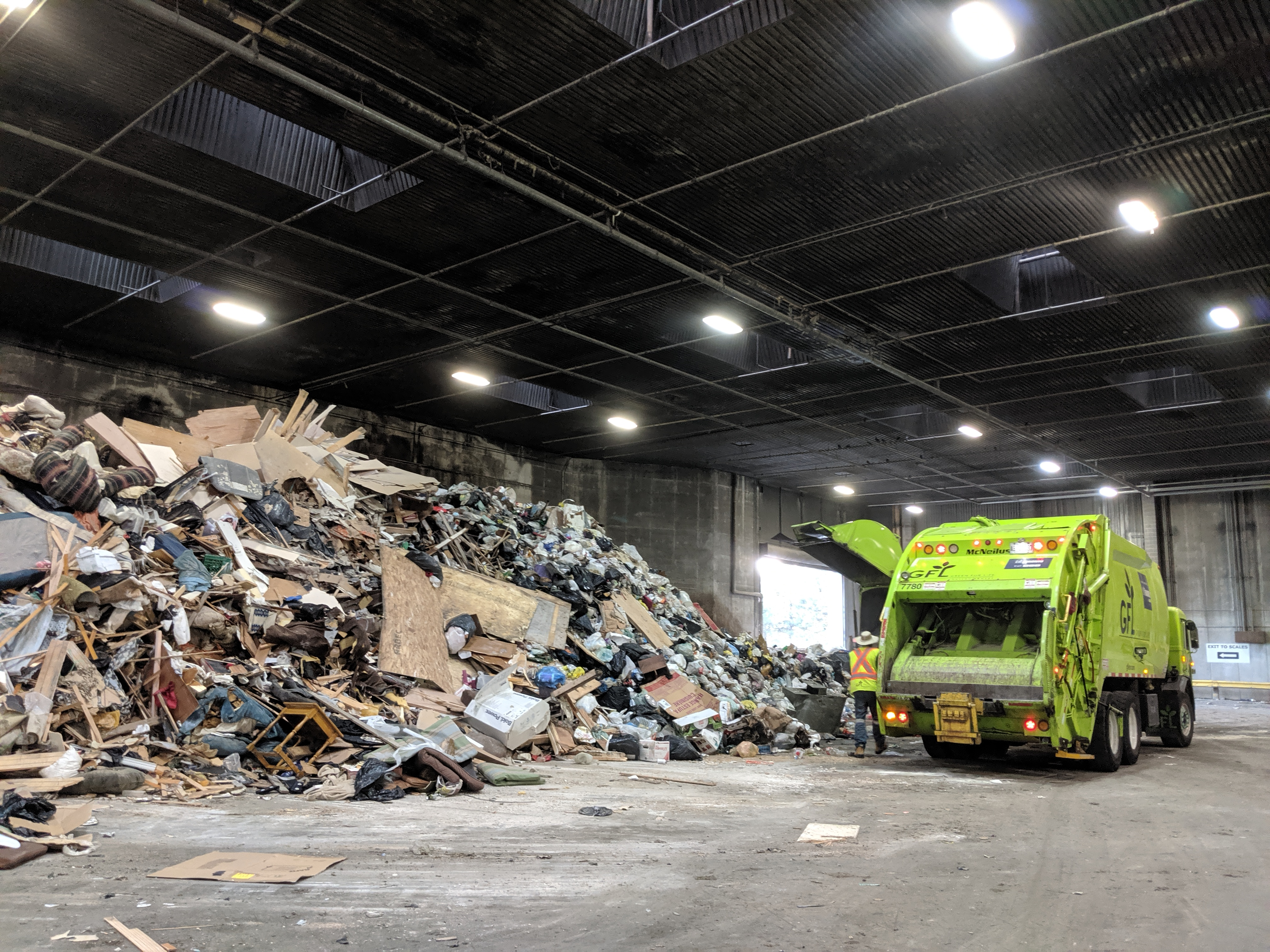
GFL trucks at Ingram Transfer Station in Toronto

In 2011, GFL won a seven-year contract to collect residential garbage from approximately 165,000 homes in west Toronto, specifically in the residential neighborhoods between Yonge Street and the Humber River. The contract was expected to save the city roughly $11 million per year or $78 million over its total term. GFL's award of the contract was particularly publicized because it represented one of Toronto's first moves to privatize and outsource the city's residential garbage collection.

GFL's contract with the city of Toronto to collect residential waste west of Yonge Street began in August 2012.

In January 2015, the Halifax council awarded GFL three new contracts to collect residential waste in Halifax for the next four years

In 2016, the city of Windsor chose to keep their waste and recycling collection service outsourced and elected to retain GFL's services for the next seven years. Windsor first contracted out its waste collection to GFL in 2010 after the city's workers went on a prolonged strike.

== Soil remediation, excavation, shoring and foundation business ==
In 2011, GFL was awarded a contract by the city of Toronto to excavate the site of the Pan Am Aquatics Centre in Toronto that was opened for the Pan Am Games in July 2015. In January 2016, GFL acquired Anchor Shoring Group.

In 2022, GFL acquired Coco Paving and its affiliates to create a group called Green Infrastructure Partners.
