= Bombardier Global 7500 =

Business jet

Global 7500 and 8000
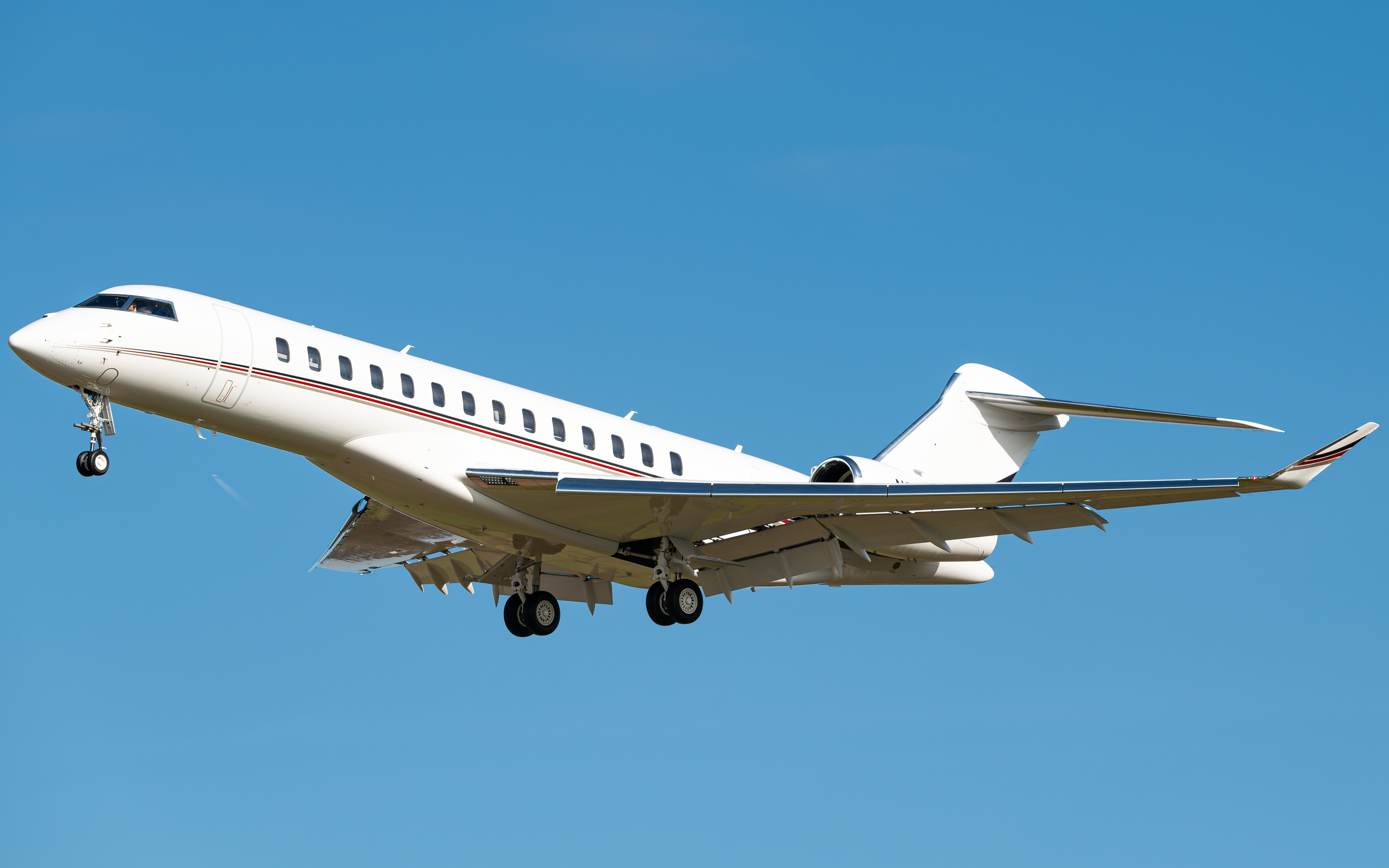
- Global 7500 at EBACE 2019

General information
- Type: Business jet
- National origin: Canada
- Manufacturer: Bombardier Aviation
- Status: In service
- Number built: 7500: 251; 8000: 44 (Note: 1 unit, C-GLBG, was converted from a Global 7500 as an experimental aircraft. This unit is counted in both production totals) as of November 2026

History
- Manufactured: 7500: 2016–2026; 8000: 2025–present
- Introduction date: 7500: December 20, 2018; 8000: December 8, 2025
- First flight: 7500: November 4, 2016; 8000: May 16, 2025
- Developed from: Bombardier Global 6000

The Bombardier Global 7500 and Global 8000 are ultra long-range business jets developed by Bombardier Aviation (formerly Bombardier Aerospace). The Global 7500, originally named the Global 7000, made its first flight on November 4, 2016, was type certified by Transport Canada on September 28, 2018, and entered service on 20 December 2018.

The Global 7500 is a clean sheet design with a new transonic wing and is the first purpose built business jet featuring a four-zone cabin. The Global 7500 has a range of 7,700 nmi (8,900 mi; 14,300 km) and is the largest business jet in the world.

The Global 8000 was initially a shorter, three-zone aircraft but was updated in May 2022 as a four-zone jet similar to the Global 7500, reaching 8,000 nautical miles (9,200 mi; 15,000 km) and with a top speed of Mach 0.95 (729 mph or 633 kn or 1,173 km/h), making it the fastest business jet and fastest civilian aircraft since Concorde. The Global 8000, also has a cabin altitude of 2,691 feet (820 m) while flying at 41,000 feet (12,000 m), the lowest cabin altitude of any business jet in production. The Global 8000 was introduced in 2025.

== Development ==
Announced in October 2010, the jets were initially scheduled for introduction in 2016 for the Global 7500 and 2017 for the Global 8000. In 2015, Bombardier decided to redesign the aircraft's wing, a change that, in conjunction with other design challenges, delayed the programme by over two years. The goal of the redesign was to reduce the wing's weight without altering its aerodynamic profile. The aircraft fly-by-wire system architecture is based on that of the CSeries. The airframe will use aluminium–lithium alloys like the other airliner. The program cost more than US$1 billion.

=== Bombardier Global 7500 ===
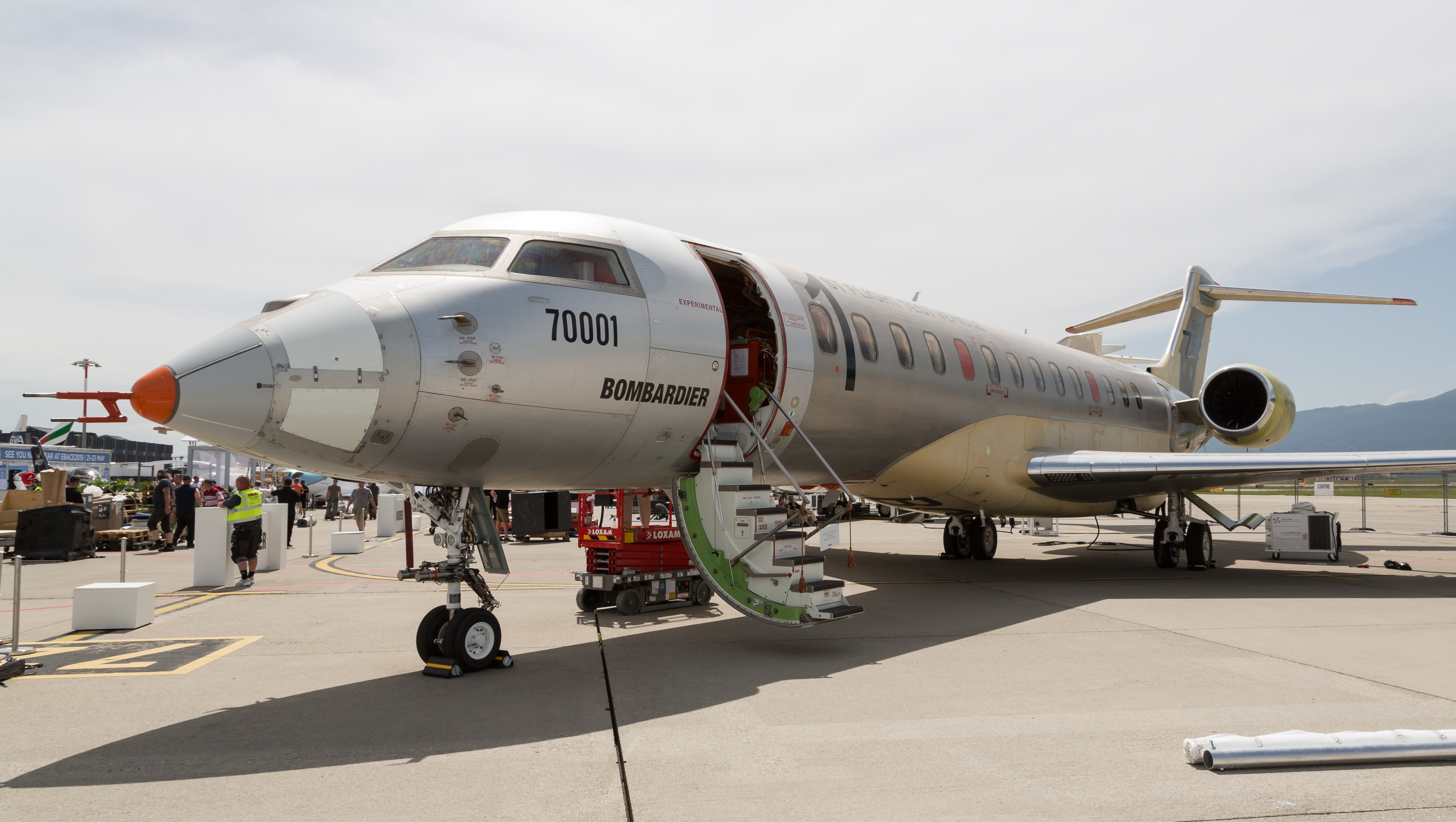
The 7500 fuselage is 11 ft 3 in (3.43 m), longer than the original Global Express

Formerly named Global 7000, its entry into service was initially scheduled for 2016. Former Formula One driver and long time Bombardier brand ambassador Niki Lauda announced his order ahead of the EBACE 2015 convention.

The first test aircraft underwent taxi testing in October 2016. Dedicated to testing basic system functionality and assessing the handling and flying qualities of the aircraft, its maiden flight was performed on November 4, 2016, climbing to 20,000 feet (6,096 m) and reaching 240 knots (280 mph) during the 2 h 27 min flight.

The production wing was in final design in February 2017. FTV2 flew on March 6, 2017, "The Powerhouse" is designed to test aircraft systems, including propulsion, electrical and mechanical systems. FTV1 is used to open the performance envelope and reached Mach 0.995 on March 29, 2017. FTV3 flew on May 10, 2017, "The Navigator" will be used to test the avionics and electrical system performance.

By the end of May 2017, the three prototypes flew a combined 250 hours.

The fourth prototype, used for cabin interior validation, is called "The Architect" and the fifth and final, for the entry-into-service, is called "The Masterpiece". The fifth has a slightly lighter production wing supplied by the Triumph Group, after a dispute over the wing weight was resolved.

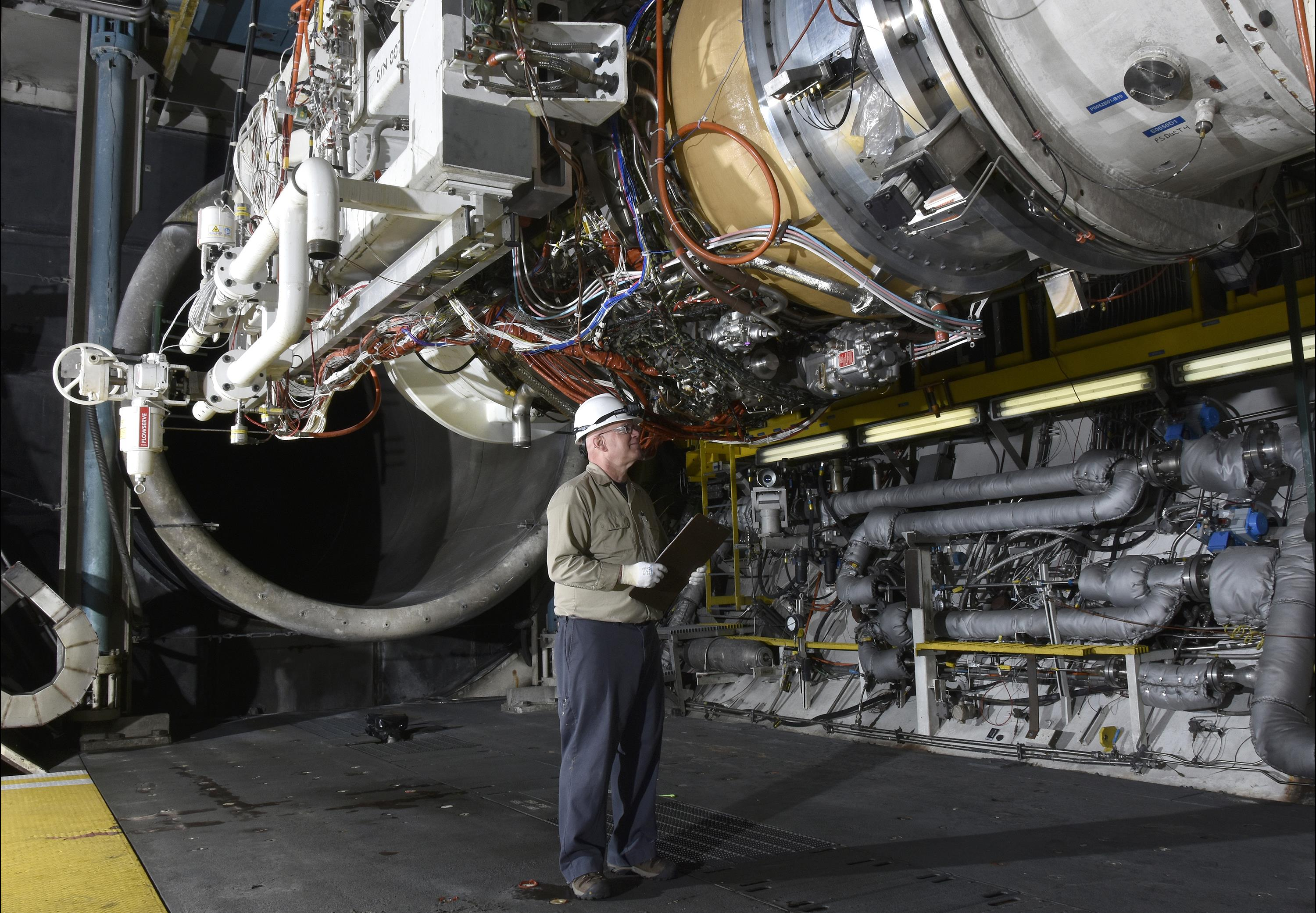
GE Passport tested at AEDC

By mid-July 2017, the three flight-test aircraft had accumulated 500 hours. On 15 August 2017, after "high vibration and high inter-turbine temperature readings", the second prototype's right GE Passport had an in-flight flameout at FL410 and the aircraft went back to Wichita Airport 156 nmi (290 km) away for a single engine landing.

By October 2017, the four flight-test aircraft had flown 900 hours.

In April 2018, the flight test campaign surpassed 1,800 hours and confirmed a range increase from 7,400 to 7,700 nmi (8,500 to 8,900 mi; 13,700 to 14,300 km), greater than the competing Gulfstream G650ER's 7,500 nmi (8,600 mi; 13,900 km), but still overshadowed by the smaller Global 8000's range of 7,900 nmi (9,100 mi; 14,600 km), 200 nmi (230 mi; 370 km) more than the Global 7500. As the original Global Express is developed into the Global 5500 and 6500, it is renamed Global 7500 to reflect this range increase.

By the end of May 2018, the five flight-test aircraft had amassed about 2,000 hours towards the type's planned entry-into-service at year-end. By June 2018, 2,300 flight test hours had been completed by the test fleet towards certification. The first production aircraft entered the completion centre in May 2018.

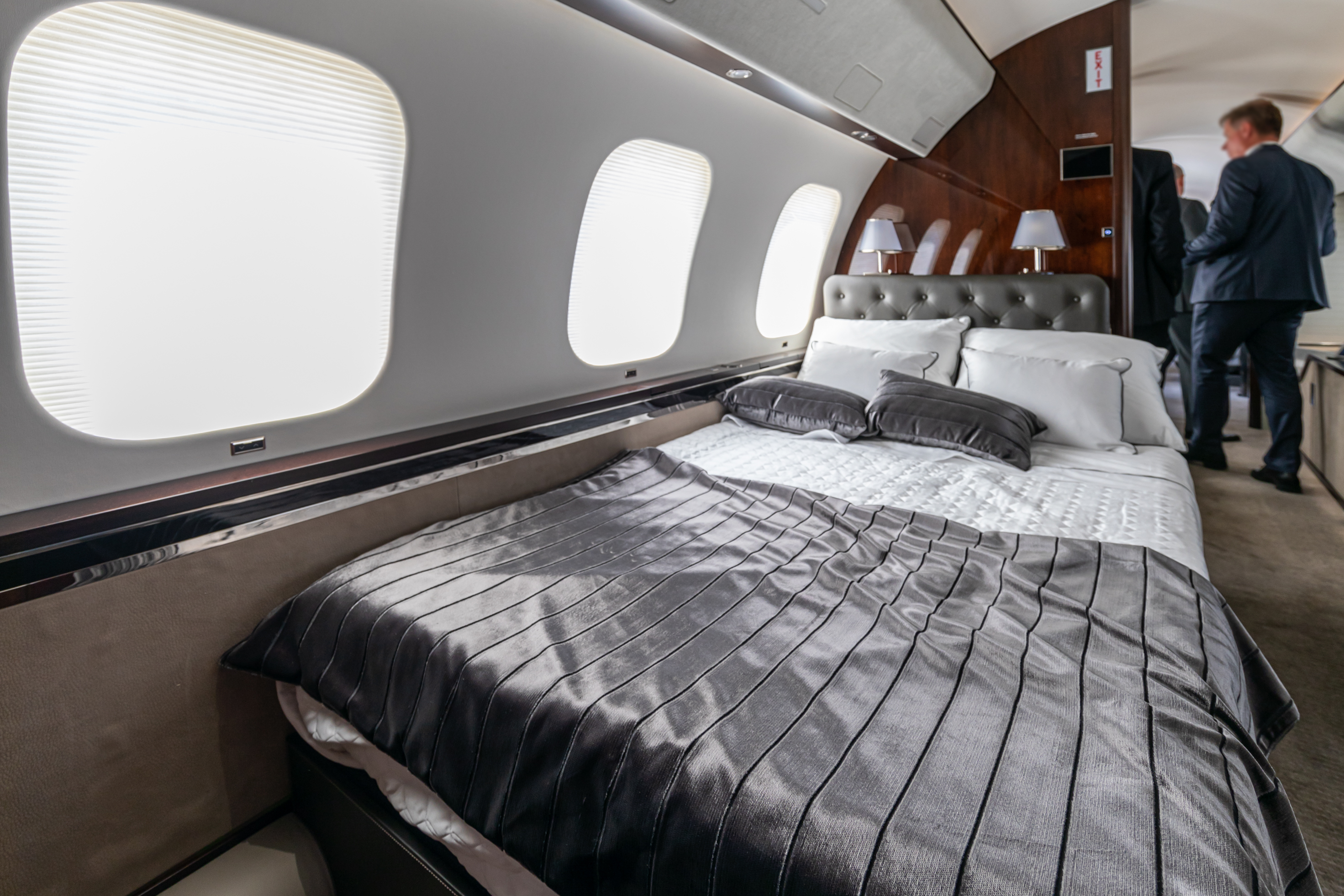
The Global 7500 bedroom

Flight testing was completed by August 2018 after over 2,400 hours; type certification and introduction into service are expected by year-end, with 15-20 customer deliveries in 2019, as 20 aircraft were in final assembly. By September 2018, the test aircraft had flown over 2,700 hours as FTV1 was retired from testing and repainted to be used as a demonstrator. Bombardier was expecting certification in September 2018.

Transport Canada awarded its type certification on September 28, 2018. FAA type certification followed on November 7, 2018. The first was expected to be delivered in December, then 15 to 20 in 2019, and 35 to 40 in 2020, with the program sold out through 2021. After being delivered in early December, the Global 7500 entered service on 20 December with 100 secured orders.

In February 2019, Bombardier acquired the Global 7500 wing manufacturing program and facilities from Triumph Group. In 2023, its equipped price was $78M.

In Aug 2024, Bombardier announced that the Global 7500 business jet had achieved over 50 speed records within a span of less than 50 weeks. In November 2024, the company announced that the Global 7500 aircraft had set its 75th speed record.

In March 2025, Bombardier marked a major achievement for its flagship business jet, the Global 7500, announcing it had reached an impressive 100 officially recognized speed records. Since its service entry in 2018, in addition to its long range and a four-zone cabin layout, the Global 7500 has proven it can connect distant city pairs faster than other jets in its class, placing it among the strongest performers in business aviation.

=== Bombardier Global 8000 ===
Entry into service was initially scheduled for 2017. By September 2016, it was delayed to early 2019. Trading nearly 8 ft (2.4 m) of cabin space for 600 nmi (690 mi; 1,100 km) of range, the Global 8000 accounted for a very small part of the backlog in December 2017 and its schedule was expected to be determined after the Global 7500 entered service. Lacking differentiation, it might be replaced by a higher maximum take-off weight (MTOW) Global 7500 variant with more range. The 8000 unit cost was $71 million in 2014.

Instead of the initially planned 2.6 m (8.5 ft) shrink of the Global 7000, Bombardier launched the Global 8000 as a longer range variant of the Global 7500 at the May 2022 EBACE. As service entry was planned for 2025, the earlier model will be phased out for the new Global 8000, while existing Global 7500s can be retrofitted through a service bulletin. Bombardier was already flight testing its modified FTV5 testbed, which reached supersonic Mach 1.015 in May 2021; the certification campaign is expected to be completed using a single prototype. With low development costs, it will compete with the new Gulfstream G800 and Dassault Falcon 10X. In 2023, its equipped price was $81M. The first prototype made its 7.1 hr maiden flight during May 2023. The first Global 8000 was delivered in December 2025.

== Design ==
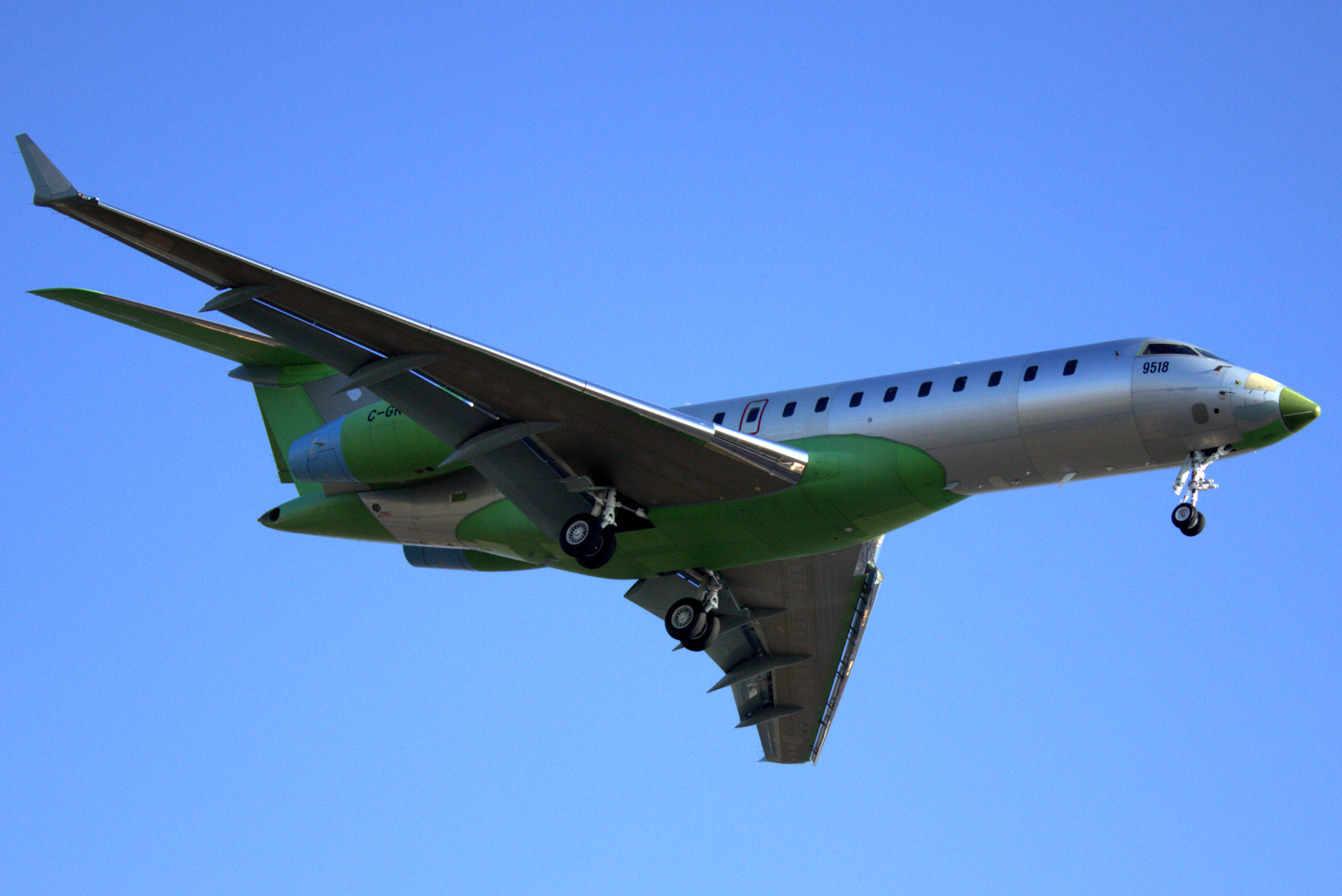
The Global 7500 and Global 8000 are part of the company's Global family of aircraft that also includes the Global 5500 and Global 6500 aircraft

Both the Global 7500 and Global 8000 feature the same transonic wing. They are powered by the General Electric Passport 20 18,920 lbf (84.2 kN) thrust engine with reduced NOx emissions and 8% better fuel efficiency than the Global Express XRS, allowing a Mach 0.90 high-speed cruise. As part of its effort to make the long-range aircraft comfortable for the passengers, Bombardier developed a new ergonomic passenger seat, called the Nuage. The seat design took seven years to complete. Airbus-owned Stelia Aerospace supplies the main fuselage.

The new, larger and lower-drag wing is optimized for Mach 0.85 with a 35.3° quarter chord wing sweep, a thinner thickness-to-chord ratio, leaner flap track fairings, improved lift-to-drag performance, more efficient winglets and up to 30% better low-speed lift due to double-slotted, inboard Fowler flaps. The new fly-by-wire flight controls with active load alleviation and the flexible, relatively highly loaded wing damps turbulence.

The metal airframe uses aluminium–lithium alloys to save weight. It shares the same fuselage diameter with older Global models, but has thinner frames, which increase the cabin width and height by 1 in (25 mm). Additionally the 300 sq in (19 dm^{2}) cabin windows are 80% larger, the nose cowl is recontoured, and the aft fuselage and empennage are both new designs. The basic inspection intervals are 850 hours or 36 months, with C checks are every 12 years or 8,500 cycles and a limit of 17,000 cycles before life extension through intensive maintenance is required.

=== Bombardier Global 7500 ===
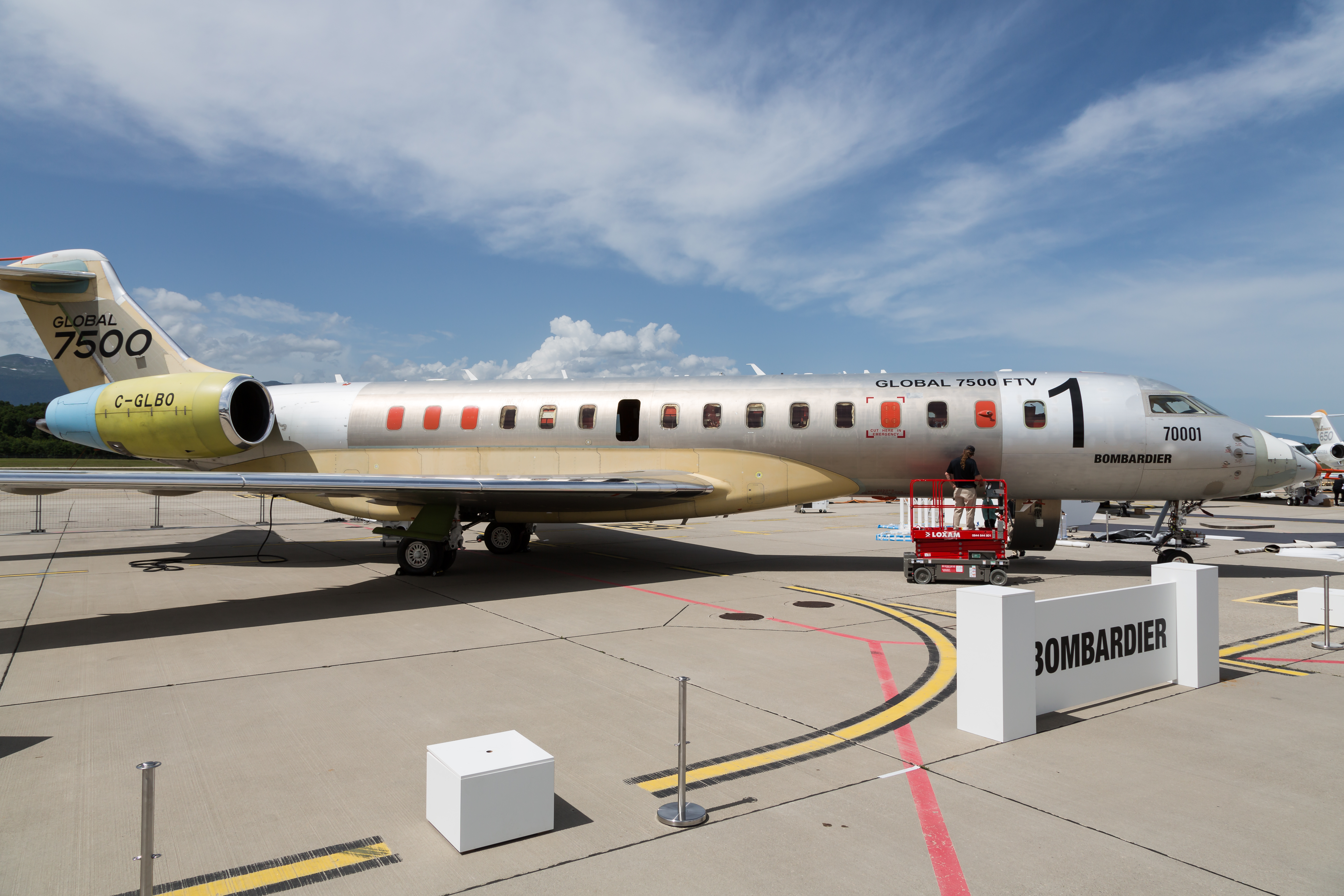
The Global 7500 flight test vehicle at EBACE in 2018

The Global 7500 cabin is one-third longer than competing models, providing a fourth seating section up from three, can sleep eight passengers and offers an optional shower and a sleeping crew rest area. Bombardier marketing focuses on ultra-high-net-worth individuals.

Despite the wing area being smaller than the Gulfstream G650ER and a 11% higher MTOW, it has lower V speeds and better runway performance due to the high-lift system with leading-edge slats and double-slotted flaps for a similar power loading. Hourly fuel flow per engine is 500 lb (230 kg) at idle, 6,240 lb (2,830 kg) at takeoff, 1,280 to 1,370 lb (580 to 620 kg) in cruise at Mach 0.85/484 kn (557 mph; 896 km/h) TAS, 1,730 lb (780 kg) at Mach 0.9/515 kn (593 mph; 954 km/h) TAS and 2,400 lb (1,100 kg) at Mach 0.925/523 kn (602 mph; 969 km/h) TAS, around 75,000 lb (34,000 kg) and ISA conditions. An even longer range variant could reach 1,000 nmi (1,200 mi; 1,900 km) more with another 8,000 lb (3,600 kg) of fuel.

=== Bombardier Global 8000 ===
The initial, smaller Global 8000 will now have the same cabin length as the company’s four zone Global 7500 jet

The initial BD-700-2A13, marketed as the Global 8000, was to be 2 ft 3 in (0.69 m) longer than the Global Express. It was to feature a three-zone 2,236 cu.ft. (63.32 cu.m.) cabin and a range of 7,900 nmi (14,631 km) at Mach 0.85, farther than any other existing business jet.

At the 2022 European Business Aviation Conference and Exhibition, Bombardier announced that the Global 8000 would feature the same cabin length as the company’s Global 7500 aircraft with a range of 8,000 nmi (14,800 km) and reach a maximum speed of Mach 0.95. The Global 8000 is currently the fastest civilian aircraft since Concorde and the fastest business jet in the world. The Global 8000 is available as an upgrade to existing Global 7500 aircraft or as production baseline (serial 70240, 70250 and subsequent), incorporated flight envelope expansion from M.925 to M.950, thrust increase of up to 7%, fuel volume increase, reduced cabin altitude, Environmental Control System (ECS) flow reduction, and changes to the avionics including automatic ADS selection.

== Operational history ==
In March 2019, a Global 7500 set the record for the longest mission ever flown by a purpose-built business jet, with a 8,152 nmi (9,381 mi; 15,098 km), 16-hour flight from Singapore to Tucson, Arizona; the aircraft landed with fuel reserves for nearly 1.5 hours of additional flight. On 6 October 2019 Bombardier improved their longest mission with an 8,225 nmi (9,465 mi; 15,233 km) non-stop flight between Sydney and Detroit, claiming the record for "the longest city-pair flown by a purpose-built business aircraft". The Global 7500 also broke the business jet speed record for a flight from Van Nuys Airport near Los Angeles to Teterboro Airport near New York in under four hours, cruising at Mach 0.925 for much of the flight. In May 2019, a Global 7500 completed the longest ever non-stop flight from London City Airport, taking off from the airport's 4,948 ft runway and flying to Van Nuys Airport with the equivalent weight of a fully fitted interior and 2,400 lbs of additional payload.

== Operators ==
While Bombardier is not publishing a specific backlog, industry analyst Rolland Vincent estimated that 200 orders had accumulated by the time of the first flight in November 2016, mostly for the 7500 version. Including the Global 5500/6500, Bombardier expects to deliver 90–100 Globals a year by 2021, up from 40 in 2018, with four 7500 a month, and higher if needed. Luxury charter VistaJet signed a deal to purchase up to 30 units; NetJets, the largest fractional jet provider, will take up to 20 Global 7500s and Hong Kong management firm HK Bellawings Jet has 18 Global 6500/7500s orders and options. The Global 7500 had 100 secured orders as it entered service on 20 December 2018. In October 2019, VistaJet said it plans to launch commercial flights on its first Global 7500 in January 2020. Bombardier considered 2020 a successful year for the Global 7500 as they delivered 35 aircraft to various customers, and on 29 March 2021, the company marked the milestone delivery of the 50th Global 7500. As of 6 December 2024, the company delivered its 200th Global 7500.

In November 2022, NetJets was named as the fleet launch customer for the Global 8000. The company paid US$312M in a firm order for four Global 8000s and also converted existing orders for eight Global 7500s to 8000s. NetJets plans to convert its current fleet of Global 7500s to a 24 aircraft fleet of Global 8000s.

Known orders
Date	Customer	Delivery	7500	8000
21 October 2010	London Air Services	TBD	1	
14 December 2010	Comlux	TBD	2	
2 March 2011	NetJets	TBD		24
21 June 2011	VistaJet Holding SA	TBD		10
21 June 2011	AvWest	TBD	4	2
27 November 2012	VistaJet	TBD		6
18 June 2013	Undisclosed	TBD		12
30 January 2014	Undisclosed	TBD	2	3
November 2020	Chamath Palihapitiya	TBD	1	
December 2023	Rolex	TBD	1	
16 June 2026	BUA Group	D		1

=== Military and government operators ===
Switzerland
- 1 Global 7500 for the Federal Air Transport Service (Swiss Air Force) was delivered in December 2024.

== Specifications ==
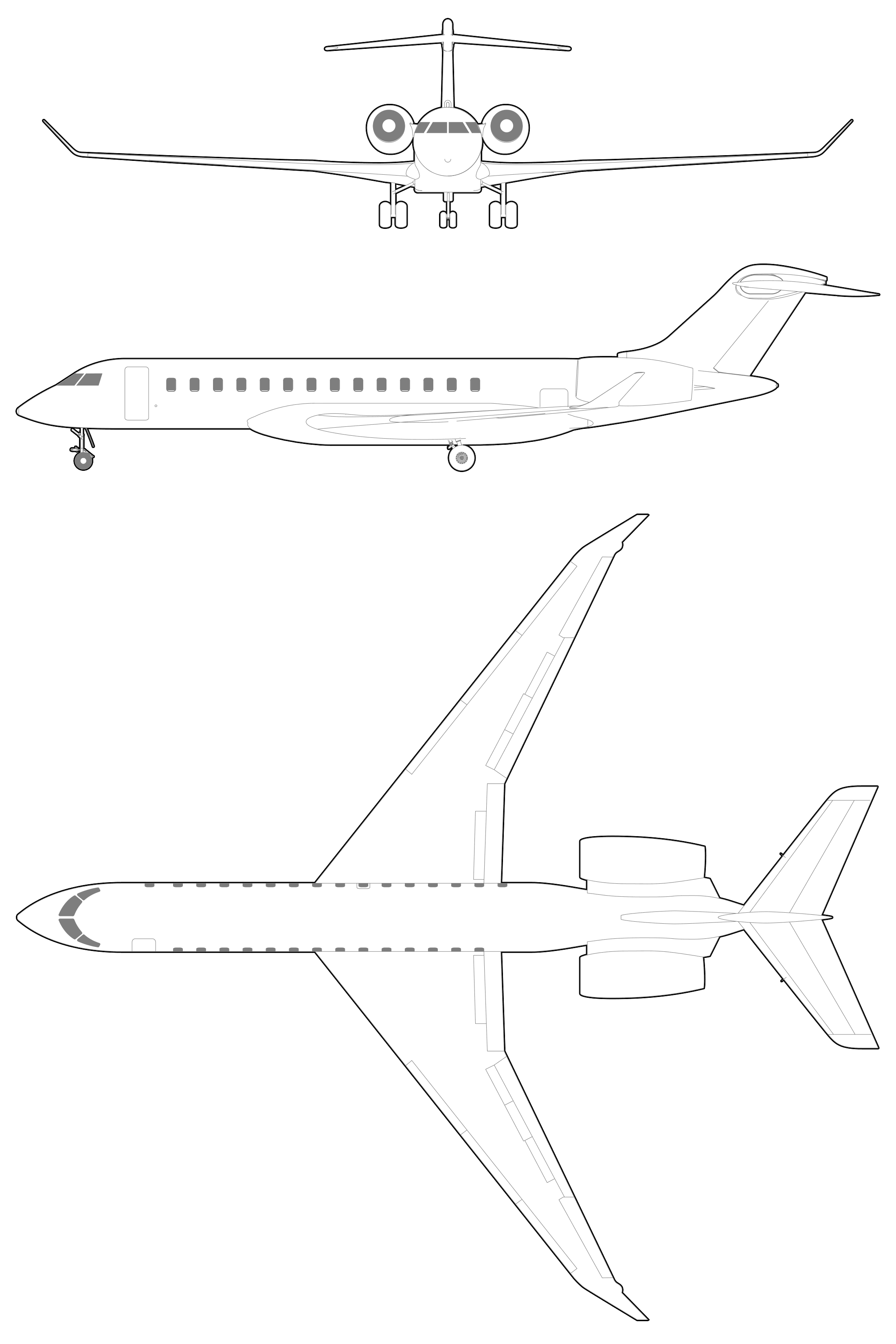
Bombardier Global 7500–8000 three views

Model	Global 7500	Global 8000
Cockpit crew	Two	
Max. passengers (Note: Standard)	19	
Length	111 ft (34 m)	
Wingspan	104 ft (32 m)	
Height	27 ft (8.2 m)	
Cabin length	54 ft 5 in (16.59 m)	
Cabin section	8 ft (2.4 m) width 6 ft 2 in (1.88 m) height	
Engines	General Electric Passport	
Thrust (Note: ISA +15°C flat rated)	18,920 lbf (84.2 kN)	
MMo	Mach 0.925 (530.6 kn; 610.6 mph; 982.7 km/h)	Mach 0.95 (545 kn; 627 mph; 1,010 km/h)
Cruise	Mach 0.85 (488 kn; 561 mph; 903 km/h) typical Mach 0.90 (516 kn; 594 mph; 956 km/h) high-speed	Mach 0.85 (488 kn; 561 mph; 903 km/h) typical Mach 0.90 (516 kn; 594 mph; 956 km/h) high-speed Mach 0.92 (528 kn; 607 mph; 977 km/h) ultra-high speed
Range (Note: M 0.85, NBAA IFR Reserves, ISA, 8 pax/4 crew)	7,700 nmi (8,900 mi; 14,300 km)	8,000 nmi (9,200 mi; 15,000 km)
Takeoff (Note: SL, ISA, MTOW)	5,760 ft (1,760 m)	
Landing (Note: SL, ISA, MLW)	2,237 ft (682 m)	2,220 ft (680 m)
Ceiling	51,000 ft (16,000 m) (Initial cruise: 43,000 ft (13,000 m))	
Weights	Global 7500	Global 8000
MTOW	114,850 lb (52,100 kg)	
BOW	61,700 lb (28,000 kg)	
Fuel capacity	51,503 lb (23,361 kg)	
Max. payload	5,800 lb (2,600 kg)	
Wing loading	91 lb/ft^{2} (440 kg/m^{2})	
Wing area	1,254 sq ft (116.5 m^{2}) (8.63 AR)	

== See also ==
Related development

- Bombardier Global Express

Aircraft of comparable role, configuration, and era

- Airbus ACJ
- Boeing BBJ
- Gulfstream G650/G700/G800
- Dassault Falcon 7X
- Dassault Falcon 8X
- Dassault Falcon 10X

Related lists

- List of civil aircraft
