= Breakthrough (yacht) =

Motor yacht built by Feadship

History
- Name: Breakthrough
- Owner: Patrick Dovigi
- Builder: Feadship
- Yard number: 821
- Launched: 4 May 2024
- Completed: May 2025
- Status: Active

General characteristics
- Type: Superyacht
- Tonnage: 7,247 GT
- Length: 118.8 m (389 ft 9 in)
- Beam: 19.0 m (62 ft 4 in)
- Draught: 5.05 m (16 ft 7 in)
- Depth: 10.02 m (32 ft 10 in)
- Decks: 5
- Installed power: Hybrid diesel-electric & hydrogen fuel-cell
- Propulsion: 2 × 3,200 kW (4,300 hp) ABB pods + fuel-cell system
- Speed: 17 knots (31 km/h; 20 mph) (max)
- Range: 6,500 nmi (12,000 km; 7,500 mi)
- Capacity: 30 passengers
- Crew: 44
- Notes: Naval architect: De Voogt Naval Architects; Exterior design: Redman Whiteley Dixon; Interior design: Redman Whiteley Dixon; Classification: Lloyd's Register

Breakthrough is a 118.8-metre (389 ft 9 in) yacht launched on 4 May 2024 and delivered in May 2025. Built by Dutch shipbuilding cooperative Feadship, she is the world's first hydrogen fuel-cell powered superyacht, designed to cruise emission-free over short distances on green hydrogen—using onboard cryogenic storage at −253 °C (−423.4 °F)—and to power hotel loads with zero emissions. When hydrogen is not available, her fuel cells can run on methanol for greater flexibility. She also carries hybrid diesel-electric generators (e.g., biofuel-capable MTU gensets) for backup and longer-range cruising.

Originally built for Bill Gates, with many design decisions made by Melinda French Gates, the yacht was sold without the Gates family ever stepping onboard. It was purchased by Canadian waste management billionaire Patrick Dovigi.

Breakthrough has 14 balconies, seven unfolding platforms for direct sea access, an 8.2-metre (27 ft) infinity pool with contraflow, and an underwater viewing lounge. Her interior was designed by Redman Whiteley Dixon and includes a central atrium with a staircase around the elevator and a townhouse-style layout requested by the owner during construction, giving a villa-like feel within a superyacht scale. Naval architecture was by De Voogt Naval Architects. The yacht has a range of about 6,500 nautical miles (12,000 km; 7,500 mi) and a maximum speed around 17 knots (31 km/h; 20 mph) under hybrid propulsion. Classification is with Lloyd's Register, and gross tonnage is 7,247 GT.

== Specifications ==
- Length Overall: 118.8 m (390 ft)
- Beam: 19.0 m (62.3 ft)
- Draft: 5.05 m (16.6 ft)
- Gross tonnage: 7,247 GT
- Naval architect: De Voogt Naval Architects
- Exterior designer: Redman Whiteley Dixon
- Interior designer: Redman Whiteley Dixon
- Builder: Feadship, Netherlands
- Launch date: 4 May 2024
- Delivery date: May 2025
- Classification: Lloyd's Register
- Maximum speed: 17 knots (31 km/h)
- Range: 6500 nmi
- Hull: Displacement steel hull & aluminium superstructure
- Propulsion: 2 × ABB 3200 kW pods + hydrogen fuel-cell system (hybrid diesel-electric)
- Guest capacity: 30
- Crew: 44

== See also ==
- Motor yacht
- List of motor yachts by length
- List of yachts built by Feadship
- Feadship
