= Stay Grounded =

Network of climate activists against aviation

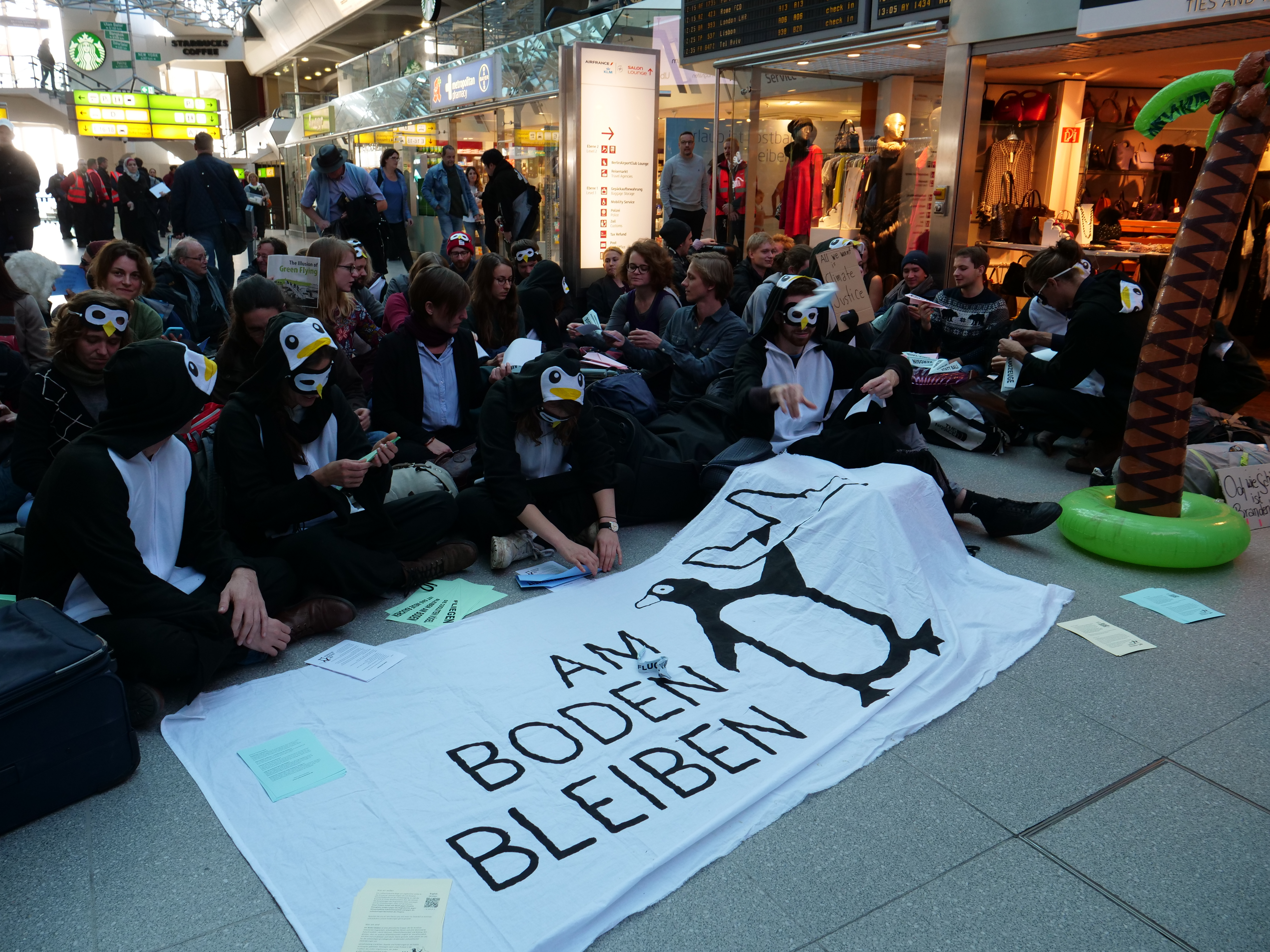
Protest by Stay Grounded at Tegel airport in Berlin in 2019

Stay Grounded is a global network of more than 200 member organizations campaigning for a just reduction of aviation to address climate change. Founded in 2016, their work is rooted in fostering sustainable transport and campaigning against ineffective or duplicitous climate strategies. The network consists of local airport opposition groups, climate justice activists, NGOs, trade unions and academics, among others.

== Mission ==
Stay Grounded's mission is rooted in campaigning for a reduction in aviation and airport expansion and supporting initiatives that promote alternatives to flying such as night trains. The network and its members campaign against greenwashing strategies such as offsetting emissions, so-called "Sustainable Aviation Fuels" and biofuels.

Members of the Stay Grounded network agree on a common position which outlines, in 13 steps, the solutions that are needed to transform transport, society and the economy. These include:

What it takes:

- A just transition – ending the over-reliance on the most polluting and climate-harming forms of transport
- A shift to other modes of transport – from the most harmful modes of transport to more environmentally sound ones
- An economy of short distances – reducing the demand for goods from far away, and the development of localised economies
- Enabling changing habits and modes of living – challenging social and workplace norms that encourage excessive air travel
- Land rights and human rights – fully recognising and respecting the rights of Indigenous Peoples, local communities, peasants and women in the governance and tenure of their land and territories
- Climate Justice – requiring societies to prioritise a 'good life for all' above profits for the few
- Strong political commitments – requiring binding and enforceable rules, and clearly defined limits for greenhouse gas emissions to limit global warming to 1.5 °C

What must be avoided:

- New airports and airport expansion – A moratorium on the construction and expansion of airports and industrial developments serving aviation growth
- Privileges for the aviation industry – The removal of special advantages over other transport sectors (such as subsidies and tax breaks)
- Air travel industry marketing – The ending of systemic incentives for air travel (e.g. frequent flyer programs that reinforce flying as a status symbol)
- Offsetting – A false solution pushed by the aviation industry and regulators that is often ineffective and introduces further problems such as local conflicts and land grabbing
- Biofuels – Substituting aeroplane fossil kerosene with biofuels, at scale, would drive a massive increase in deforestation and peat drainage, thereby causing vast carbon emissions, and further land grabbing and human rights violations
- The illusion of technological fixes – The required step-changes in aviation technology are uncertain, and will not be delivered within the urgent timescale required to reduce emissions. Decarbonised air traffic and 'carbon neutral growth' will remain an illusion throughout the crucial timeframe of the next three decades.

== History ==
In October 2016, the ICAO held a conference on the aviation industry's response to climate change. Their proposal was to have further aviation growth, incorporated with offsets that aimed to represent a way for airline passengers or 'emitters' to be encouraged to reduce emissions from other sectors as an individualized contribution towards global emission reductions. Climate activists viewed this proposal as a greenwashing strategy. While the conference was taking place, a group of locally affected opposition groups and organizations coordinated complimentary global action days under the name Stay Grounded. Aviation Growth Cancelled Due to Climate Change, in various countries, including Austria, Mexico, the United Kingdom, Canada, Turkey, France and Australia. In conjunction with these actions, a petition was signed by 50 organisations, including Attac Europe, Friends of the Earth International, Global Justice Now, Greenpeace, Indigenous Environmental Network, among several others, who are united against airport expansion projects. A civil society statement was also signed by almost 100 organizations and NGOs, including Greenpeace and Friends of the Earth, rejecting the ICAO's proposal of offsetting the aviation industry's emissions on the basis that it would propel global warming beyond 1.5 °C.

Magdalena Heuwieser, a climate justice activist living in Germany, and Mira Kapfinger, an Austrian climate justice activist, are founders of Stay Grounded. Since 2017, they have been organizing network meetings twice a year.

In the Autumn of 2018, to mark the official launch of the network, Stay Grounded held two weeks of protest events around the globe under the banner 'Counter Aviation', showing that in the face of the climate crisis, aviation growth cannot continue – as well as highlighting more environmentally sound and socially just forms of mobility. Twenty seven protests took place including in the Philippines, Mexico, France, UK, Austria, Denmark, Germany, Belgium, Sweden, the Netherlands, Australia, and Switzerland.

In July 2019, the Stay Grounded Network, together with civil society organisations and the Institute for Ecological Sciences and Technology (ICTA) in Barcelona, organised the "Degrowth of Aviation" conference. The conference brought together 200 people from social movements, NGOs and academia in order to discuss concrete measures and strategies to reduce air traffic. As Barcelona is one of the cities becoming overcrowded by tourism, involving serious environmental, health, housing and other social problems, special links were made to movements for a just and environmentally sound tourism.

In October 2022, over 200 people met in Lille, northern France, for the second international conference of the Stay Grounded network, the 'Aviaction Stay Grounded Conference 2022'. Hosted by the association N.A.D.A. – No to the expansion of Lille-Lesquin Airport – the conference days provided the chance to share experiences and discuss strategies to counter the climate-damaging aviation industry – the most polluting and most unjust of all means of transport.

Faced with the climate crisis and the aviation industry's ecocidal plans, they imagined joint actions to stop the expansion of airports, reduce air traffic and defend life.

In July 2025, Stay Grounded hosted an international conference in Barcelona titled 'Beyond Tourism, Aviation and Capitalism'. The conference programme included thematic groups, workshops, panels and keynote speakers. The conference had a hybrid format with in-person sessions and on-line participation for those not able to travel to Barcelona, all participants travelled there by train and grounded transport. Two parallel conferences ran in Mexico and India at the same time and connected to the Barcelona conference during specific sessions.

== Media attention ==
Since their inception in 2016, Stay Grounded has received attention as a result of activism and campaigns. Significant moments include the November 2019 climate protest at Berlin's Tegel airport in which several climate protesters staged a sit-in, resulting in traffic jams and delays for airline passengers. Approximately 50 members of the group gathered in the main entrance of a terminal to stage the sit-in while another 80 people organized a public demonstration. Many of the climate activists present were dressed in penguin costumes, and carried signs that urged people to think of alternative forms of transport instead of flying.

In light of the COVID-19 pandemic and the ensuing economic recovery packages, the Stay Grounded network responded by launching a petition under the hashtag, #SavePeopleNotPlanes in which they are campaigning against allowing the aviation industry to receive bailouts during and after the pandemic.

In October 2024, The Guardian, El Pais, Der Tagesspiegel, EuroNews.com and others reported on a new report by Stay Grounded and the New Economic Foundation (NEF) that found that a Frequent Flying Levy (FFL) could raise €64 billion, and reduce emissions by 20%, without any financial cost to the majority of people. The report, endorsed by 90 organisations and 47 academics including Greenpeace, suggested that the revenues raised could be used, for example, to expand and provide affordable railways and public transport.

In August 2024, Euronews.com reported on Stay Grounded's comments on Air New Zealand's decision to scrap its 2030 airline carbon emissions reduction targets, citing the infeasibility of scaling up the use of so-called “Sustainable” aviation fuels (SAF) in time to meet the current targets. Stay Grounded contended that the only timely solution to allow Air New Zealand to adequately reduce their emissions is to stop the air industry's growth plans and to massively reduce the number of global daily flights.

In November 2023, Euronews.com and others reported on Stay Grounded's comments on the aviation sectors attempts to promote sustainable flights, following the first transatlantic flight by a passenger plane to use exclusively "Sustainable" Aviation Fuels. Campaigners argue that this is a greenwashing distraction from the urgent need to reduce flights, as so-called “SAFs” do not reduce emissions significantly enough and are not sustainable at the scale needed to power the number of flights that take off every day.
