= Waste Industries =

American waste management company

- Type: Subsidiary
- Industry: Waste management
- Founded: 1970; 53 years
- Founder: Lonnie Poole Jr.
- Headquarters: Raleigh, North Carolina, Raleigh, United States
- Area served: United States
- Key people: Ven Poole (Chairman, Chief Executive Officer); Greg Yorston (President, Chief Operating Officer); Steve Grissom (Senior Vice President, Chief Financial Officer)
- Number of employees: 1600
- Parent: GFL Environmental
- Website: WasteIndustries.com

Waste Industries is a waste management company headquartered in Raleigh, North Carolina. Specializing in non-hazardous solid waste, recycling collection of waste disposal from residential and commercial customers in the Southeastern United States.

== Company history ==
Waste Industries was created by Lonnie Poole Jr. in 1970 as a waste disposal firm. Funding for his company was from the sale of his Ohio home. Poole made the decision to start Waste Industries in Raleigh, North Carolina upon researching the need to develop a mobile landfill compactor in the American southeast region.

In the 1970s, Waste Industries expanded their service operations area beyond Wake County. A decade later, in 1980, the company generated over ten million dollars in revenue growing the business. During this expansion, they named their first employee, Jim Perry, as President and Chief Operating Officer.

In 1997, with an estimated revenue of $100 million, Waste Industries went public. The company continued to grow that year with an estimated 20 branches, 11 transfer stations, including 4 recycling facilities under its belt.

In 2008, the company announced an agreement to go private with financial partners Macquarie Infrastructure Partners and Goldman Sachs. The total equity value of the transaction was valued at approximately $544 million. Ven Poole, son of original owner Lonnie Poole and long-time company leader, became chairman and CEO and created his personal board. Greg Yorston became Chief Operating Office, Steve Grissiom became Chief Financial Officer, and Lisa Inman became Senior Vice President and General Counsel.

On December 17, 2010, NC State University named the Poole College of Management, honoring the college's benefactor, Lonnie C. Poole, Jr. On February 28, 2014, the college unveiled a wall display in Nelson Hall honoring Poole and summarizing the progress of his company, Waste Industries. Poole was the first in his family to go to college, receiving his bachelor's degree in engineering from NC State in 1959 and his MBA from the University of North Carolina at Chapel Hill in 1965. In 2010, Poole made a $37 million gift to endow the college, which had been established in 1992.

Lonnie Poole Jr. was named North Carolina Entrepreneur of the Year by Inc Magazine in 1992 and was inducted into the Environmental Industry Hall of Fame in 1994.

On October 10, 2018, the company announced it was going to be sold off to a Canadian Company, GFL Environmental, for an undisclosed amount. The company's founder, Lonnie Poole Jr., stated that the company would continue to operate as Waste Industries and would remain headquartered in Raleigh, North Carolina.

Under new ownership, Waste Industries began acquiring independent recycling companies, including Pink-Trash out of Wilmington, North Carolina and Ray’s Rural Garbage Collection out of Richlands, North Carolina.

== Full Circle Project ==
In 2014, Waste Industries created the Full Circle Project. The Full Circle Project allows e-billing customers to choose how Waste Industries handles its charitable contributions. The charities are broken up into nine categories, including Animal Welfare, Cancer & Medical Wellness, Nature Conservation, Poverty Reduction, First Responders & Veterans, Family Wellness, and Arts, Culture & Education. At the end of the year, Waste Industries takes the percentage breakdowns and allocates its funding to various charities within that charity class at the voted percentage.

Past charitable recipients of the Full Circle Project include Habitat for Humanity, The Jimmy V. Foundation, HOPE Packs, Veteran's Life Center, SPCA of Wake County, Good Shepherd Center, Food on Foot, Delaware Warriors Helping Warriors, and Food Bank of Central and Eastern NC.
