= Amjet Executive =

European business jet air charter company

Amjet Executive SA
IATA	ICAO	Call sign
-	AMJ	AMJET EXEC
- Founded: 13 October 2009
- AOC #: GR-044
- Headquarters: Glyfada, Greece
- Website: amjetexecutive.com

Amjet Executive SA is a European air charter company operating business jets, headquartered in the Greek city of Athens with a brokerage department based in Geneva, Switzerland. It flies Dassault Falcons, an Airbus A319CJ and a corporate-configured McDonnell Douglas MD-83. The company holds a Greek air operator's certificate (AOC).

== History ==
Amjet Executive SA was founded at the end of 2009 by airline pilot Abakar Manany. The company commenced operations in February 2010 when it was granted an AOC to operate a Gulfstream G200. In May 2011 the company opened its air charter brokerage department in Geneva, Switzerland.

== Fleet ==
Amjet Executive fleet
Aircraft type	In Service	Seats
Dassault Falcon 8X	1	14
Dassault Falcon 50	1	8
Dassault Falcon 2000LX	1	10
Dassault Falcon 900DX	1	14
Dassault Falcon 900EX	1	14
Dassault Falcon 7X	2	12; 14
Airbus A319CJ	1	46
McDonnell Douglas MD-83	1 (as of August 2019)	42
