= International Court of Arbitration =

Institution for resolving international trade disputes

The ICC International Court of Arbitration is an institution for the resolution of international commercial disputes. It operates under the auspices of the International Chamber of Commerce (ICC) and consists of more than 100 arbitrators from roughly 90 countries.

The court does not issue formal judgements. Instead, it provides "judicial supervision of arbitration proceedings".

The court's official working languages are English and French. Cases can be administered in any language. It is headquartered in Paris, France.

As of 9 January 2020, the court has registered 25,000 cases, including an annual record of 869 in 2019.

== Background ==
The Court was founded in 1923 under the leadership of the ICC's first president Étienne Clémentel, a former French Minister of Finance.

Members of the ICC Court are appointed to three-year terms by the ICC World Council on the recommendation of ICC 'national committees' or groups. In jurisdictions where there is no national committee or group, members are recommended for appointment by the president of the Court. Alternate members are appointed by the World Council on the recommendation of the court's president.

The president of the ICC Court is currently Claudia Salomon of the US.

Over the decades, ICC and its arbitration mechanisms have been involved in high-profile international disputes, including long-running cases such as the arbitration between the Lebanese construction company Commisimpex and the Republic of Congo. In 2013, the ICC ruled in favor of Commisimpex regarding unpaid public works contracts, a decision that has led to multiple subsequent legal proceedings and enforcement actions across several countries. Subsequent judicial investigations in France have expanded to include allegations of organized fraud and forgery related to the arbitration, lending credence to earlier concerns about corruption and conflicts of interest in the handling of the dispute.
