= Enhanced avionics system =

The Enhanced Avionics System (or EASy) is an integrated modular avionics suite and cockpit display system used on Dassault Falcon business jets since Falcon 900EX, and later used in other newer Falcon aircraft such as Falcon 2000EX and Falcon 7X.

EASy has been jointly developed by Dassault and Honeywell, and is based on Honeywell Primus Epic.

== History ==
Dassault Aviation started to develop the EASy flight deck concept in the mid-1990s with a goal to have a much better integration of aircraft systems such as FMS.

EASy was first integrated and certificated on Falcon 900EX. The first EASy equipped 900EX was delivered in December 2003. Honeywell Primus Epic base of EASy was then integrated on other business jets, and helicopters.

EASy was certified on the Falcon 2000EX in June 2004 with deliveries starting shortly after. Falcon 7X was developed from the ground-up with EASy avionics.

In October 2008, Dassault announced the launch of EASy phase II program at the annual NBAA meeting in Orlando. EASy phase II include several enhancements to EASy, such as:

- Synthetic vision system
- ADS-B Out
- paperless charts
- Future Air Navigation System (FANS-1/A) using Controller Pilot Data Link Communications (CPDLC)
- Localizer Performance with Vertical guidance (LPV)

EASy Phase II was certified on Falcon 900LX in June 2011 and on Falcon 7X in May 2013.

The Falcon 2000LXS and 2000S use an upgraded version of the Enhanced Avionics System (EASy) flight deck, which received EASA approval in March 2013.

The Falcon 6X business jet by Dassault had Easy IV avionics based on the Honeywell Primus Epic system added to its flight deck in June 2024.

In 2026, both EASy II and EASy IV avionics were compatible with the Falcon 7x.

== Architecture ==
EASy architecture is based on Integrated Modular Avionics. The processing modules are called MAU (Modular Avionics Units). The core Operating System of EASy is provided by DDCI.

== See also ==
- Integrated Modular Avionics (IMA)
- Cockpit display system
- Dassault Falcon 7X
- Dassault Aviation
