= SVW =

SVW may refer to:

- Shanghai Volkswagen Automotive, an automobile manufacturing company headquartered in Anting, Shanghai, China
- Global Jet Luxembourg, the ICAO code SVW
- Sparrevohn LRRS Airport, the IATA code SVW
- SV Werder Bremen, a German professionell sports club based in Bremen
