= Honeywell FX5 =

Geared turbofan

The Honeywell FX5 was a 6,000lb-thrust (27kN) geared turbofan based on a technology demonstrator core. Aiming for a 20%-plus reduction in the cost of ownership from the TFE731-60 and to span a 3,000–8,000 lbf (13–36 kN) family, it could have been certificated within 36 months. It was proposed for the Dassault Falcon 7X business jet launched in 2001, but the Pratt & Whitney Canada PW307 was finally selected. The Honeywell range comprises the previous 6,700–7,500 lbf (30–33 kN) Lycoming ALF502/Honeywell LF507 and the subsequent 6,540–7,550 lbf (29.1–33.6 kN) Honeywell HTF7000.
