= List of defunct airlines of Luxembourg =

This is a list of defunct airlines of Luxembourg.

| Airline | Image | IATA | ICAO | Callsign | Commenced operations | Ceased operations | Notes |
|---|---|---|---|---|---|---|---|
| Air Print | | | APJ | AIR PRINT | 2004 | 2013 | Operated Cessna 525B CitationJet CJ3, Dassault Falcon 50 |
| Europe Air Charter | | | PTU | AEROLUX | 1999 | 2002 | Operated Embraer Brasilia |
| Interocean Airways | | | | | 1960 | 1966 | Operated Carvair, DC-3, DC-4, DC-6, Lockheed Constellation |
| JDP Lux | | | JDP | RED PELICAN | 2001 | 2016 | Operated Beech 1900, Beech King Air |
| Lionair | | | LIR | LIAR | 1988 | 1990 | |
| Luxair Commuter | | | | | 1986 | 1997 | To Luxair. Operated Embraer Brasilia |
| Luxembourg Airlines | | | | | 1947 | 1961 | Renamed to Luxair. Operated Curtiss C-46 |
| Nittler Air Transport International | | | | | 1969 | 1979 | Operated Lockheed Starliner |
| Seven Seas Airlines | | | | | 1957 | 1961 | Operated Curtiss C-46, Douglas C-54 |
| Silver Arrows | | | SVW | | 1999 | 2004 | Renamed/merged to Global Jet Luxembourg |
| Strategic Airlines Luxembourg | | SH | STU | LUXLINER | 2010 | 2012 | |
| West Air Luxembourg | | NI | WLX | WEST LUX | 2003 | 2014 | |

== See also ==
- List of airlines of Luxembourg
- List of airports in Luxembourg
