= Dassault Falcon 7X =

Executive trijet aircraft by Dassault

Falcon 7X/8X
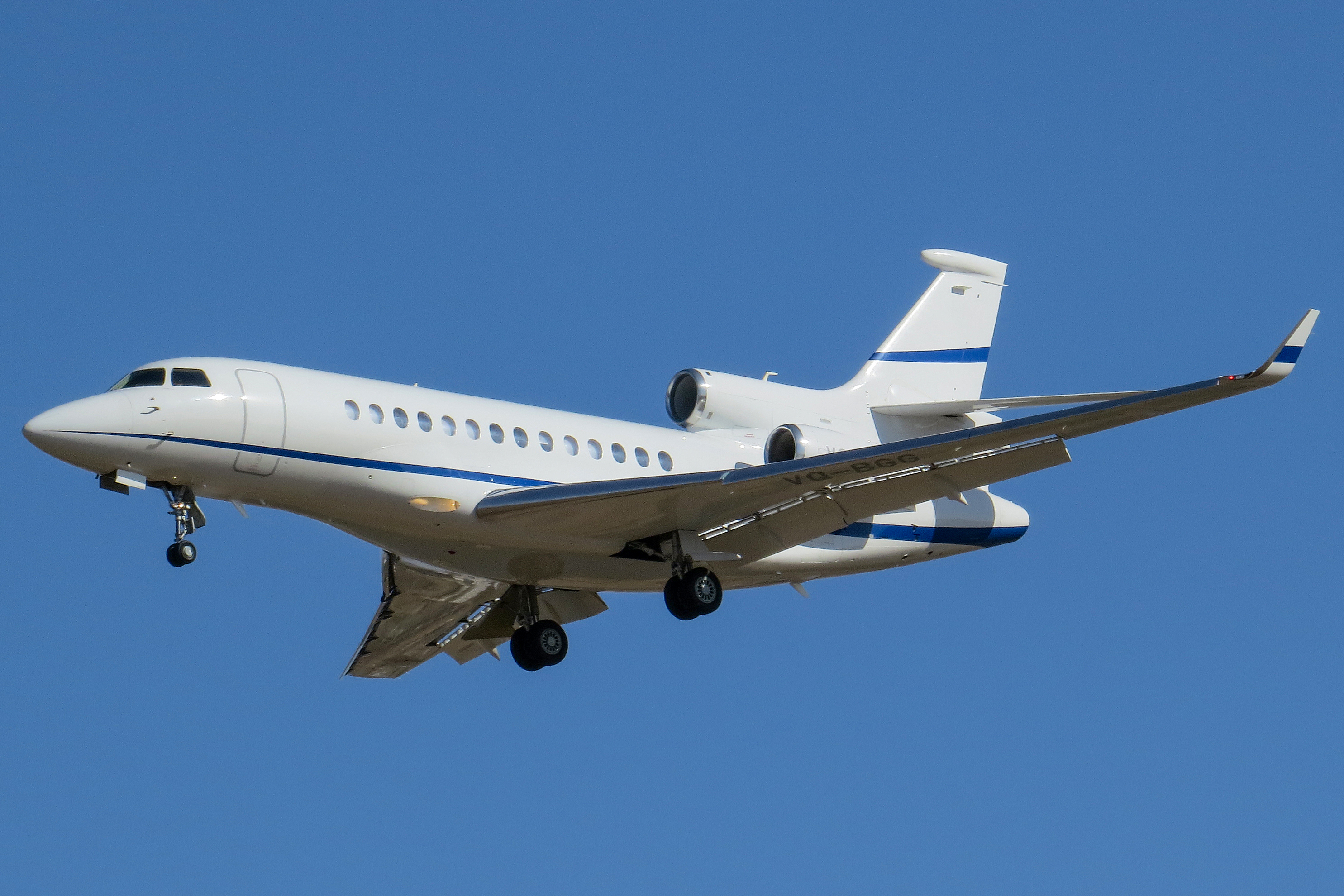
- A Falcon 7X, landing gear down, flaps deployed

General information
- Type: Intercontinental business jet
- National origin: France
- Manufacturer: Dassault Aviation
- Primary users: Air Alsie Flying Group; Volkswagen AirService GmbH; Shell Oil
- Number built: 289 (7X, Q1 2020), ~50 (8X, 2018)

History
- Manufactured: 2005–2023
- Introduction date: 7X: 15 June 2007; 8X: 5 October 2016
- First flight: 7X: 5 May 2005; 8X: 6 February 2015
- Developed from: Dassault Falcon 900

The Dassault Falcon 7X is a large-cabin, 5,950-nautical-mile (11,019 km; 6,847 mi) range business jet manufactured by Dassault Aviation. Unveiled at the 2001 Paris Air Show, its first flight took place on 5 May 2005 and it entered service on 15 June 2007. The Falcon 8X, first delivered on 5 October 2016, is derived from the 7X and has an extended range of 6,450 nmi (11,945 km; 7,423 mi) made possible through engine optimization, aerodynamic refinements as well as an increase in fuel capacity.

== Falcon 7X ==
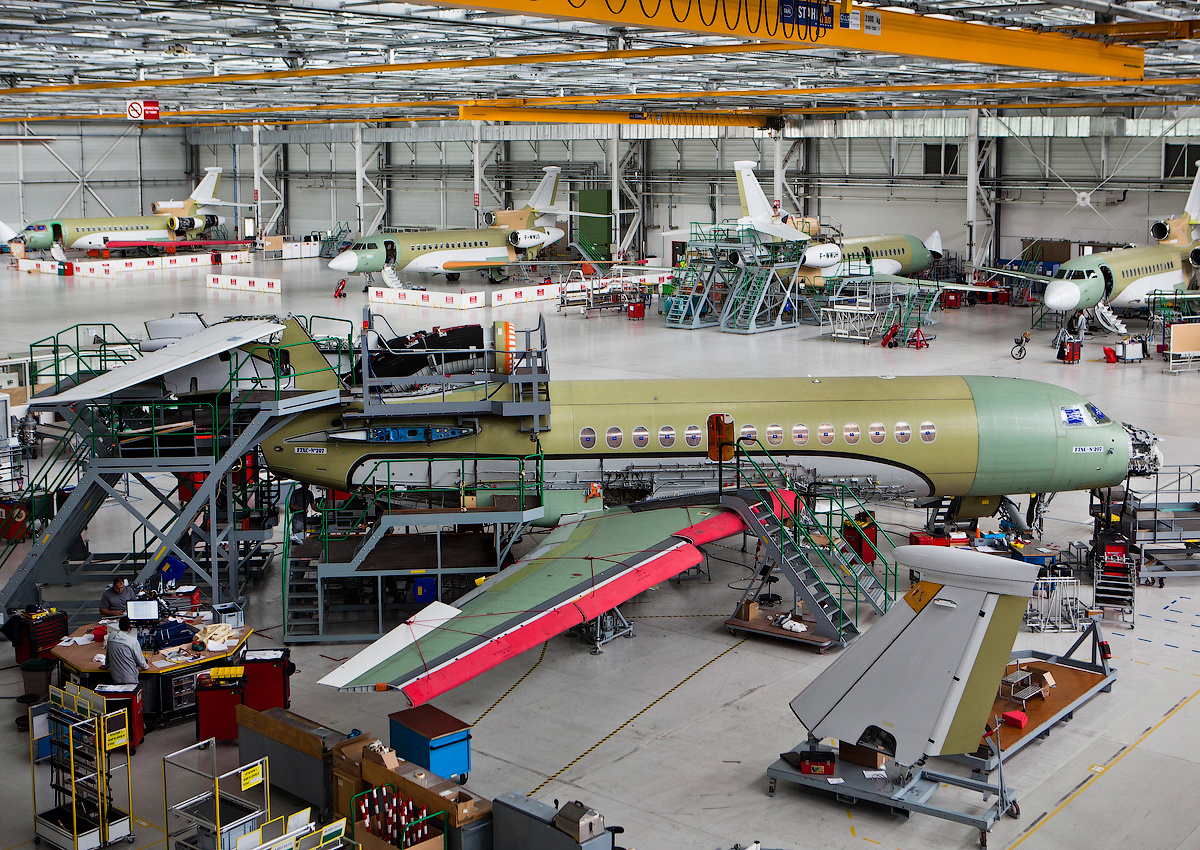
Dassault Falcon 7X assembly line at Bordeaux–Mérignac Airport

=== Development ===
Dassault launched the FNX at the 2001 Paris Air Show, aiming for a 10,500 km (5,700 nm) range at Mach 0.88, up from the Falcon 900EX's 8,300 km at Mach 0.84. Its new high-speed wing is 1.86 m (6 ft 1 in) longer with 5° higher wing sweep than the 900 wing; while its fuselage is 20% longer, it keeps the same cabin cross-section but with a new curved windscreen. The trijet has a combined thrust of 18,000 lb (80 kN) provided by Honeywell FX5s, a new design, or a Pratt & Whitney Canada PW306 growth version. Based on Honeywell Primus Epic avionics, its EASy cockpit is developed for the Falcon 2000EX and 900EX and controls are fly-by-wire. Scheduled to fly in 2004, first deliveries were planned for mid-2006.

With 41 deposits, it was named 7X in November with first flight slipping from late 2004 to early 2005 and certification planned for mid-2006. With a simplified structure to reduce cost and weight, the optimised high-transonic wing improves the lift-to-drag ratio by 10% over the supercritical wing of the Falcon 50 shared by previous Falcons. The cabin is 2.4 m (8 ft) longer than the 900 and has a lower 6,000 ft (1,800m) cabin altitude. The 6,100 lbf (27 kN) PW307A was finally selected, among other risk-sharing partners: Honeywell for avionics architecture, auxiliary power unit, air management system; with Parker Hannifin for the power generation system and wheels brakes; and TRW Aeronautical Systems for the hydromechanical flap and airbrake systems.

With over 50 firm orders, it completed its first flight on 5 May 2005, flying for 1h 36min from Bordeaux-Merignac, starting a 1,200h flight test programme over 15 month: it climbed to 10,000 ft (3,000 m) for hydraulic, fuel, air data and landing gear extraction/retraction systems tests, then climbed to 25,000 ft for acceleration/deceleration tests and basic autopilot and autothrottle operations. The second Falcon 7X was planned to join in June of that year, and the third with a full interior in September that year for long-range, endurance tests and interior sound level validation: Dassault aims for a 52 dB sound level in the cabin, 4 dB lower than other Falcons. Certification slipped to late 2006 and first deliveries to early 2007.

It was first presented to the public at the 2005 Paris Air Show. The aircraft has received its type certification from both the Federal Aviation Administration and European Aviation Safety Agency (EASA) on 27 April 2007. The first 7X, MSN05, entered service on 15 June 2007. The hundredth was delivered in November 2010. It conducted high altitude airport tests at 4,400 m (14,500 ft) in Daocheng in 2014.

=== Price ===
In 2001, the Falcon 7X, at approximately $35 million (preproduction order price), was nearly $10 million less expensive than its nearest competitors in the long-range, large cabin market segment, including the Gulfstream G550 and Bombardier Global Express. It was targeted to be priced for 2004 at 12% more than the $33 million top-of-the-range Falcon 900EX equipped: $39.6 million. Its price was $37 million in 2005, and $41 million in 2007. In 2017, its list price was $54M, a three-to-four-year-old 7X was worth $27–34m and a seven-to-nine-year-old one cost $19–24M. The latest market data for Q1 2020 shows 287 out of 289 aircraft currently in operation with an asking price range of $18,495,000–$24,800,000.

In 2022, its equipped price was $54.2M.

=== Design ===
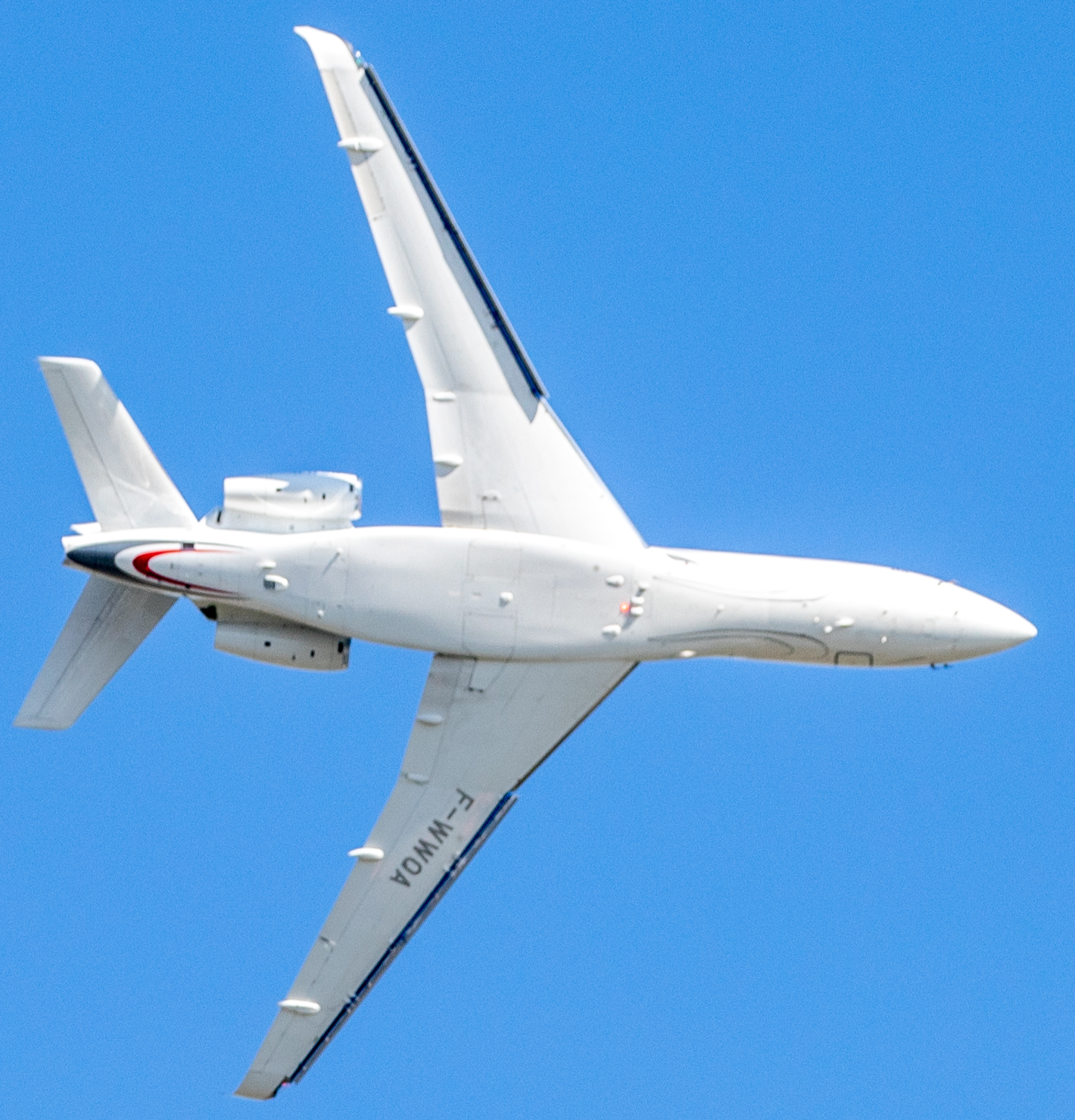
Planform view showing the 34.5° wing sweep

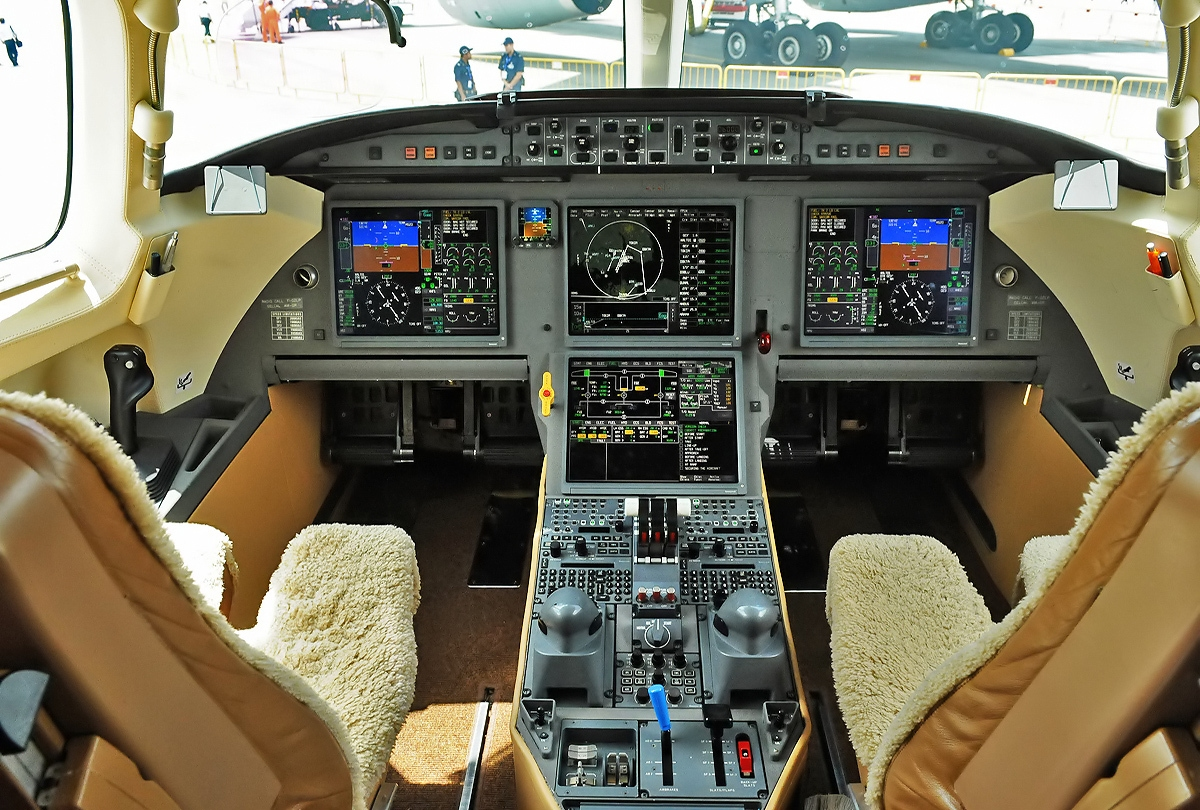
Falcon 7X Cockpit

The Falcon 7X is a three-engined cantilever monoplane with a low-positioned, highly swept wing. It has a horizontal stabiliser at mid-height and a retractable tricycle landing gear, and three rear-mounted Pratt & Whitney PW307A turbofan engines: two on the sides of the fuselage and one in a center position, and room for 19 passengers and three crew. It is the first production Falcon jet with winglets.

It is the first fully fly-by-wire business jet and is equipped with the same avionics suite, the Honeywell Primus Epic "Enhanced Avionics System" (EASy), that was used on the Falcon 900EX and later on the Falcon 2000EX.

The Falcon 7X is notable for its extensive use of computer-aided design, the manufacturer claiming it to be the "first aircraft to be designed entirely on a virtual platform", using Dassault Systèmes' CATIA and PLM products.

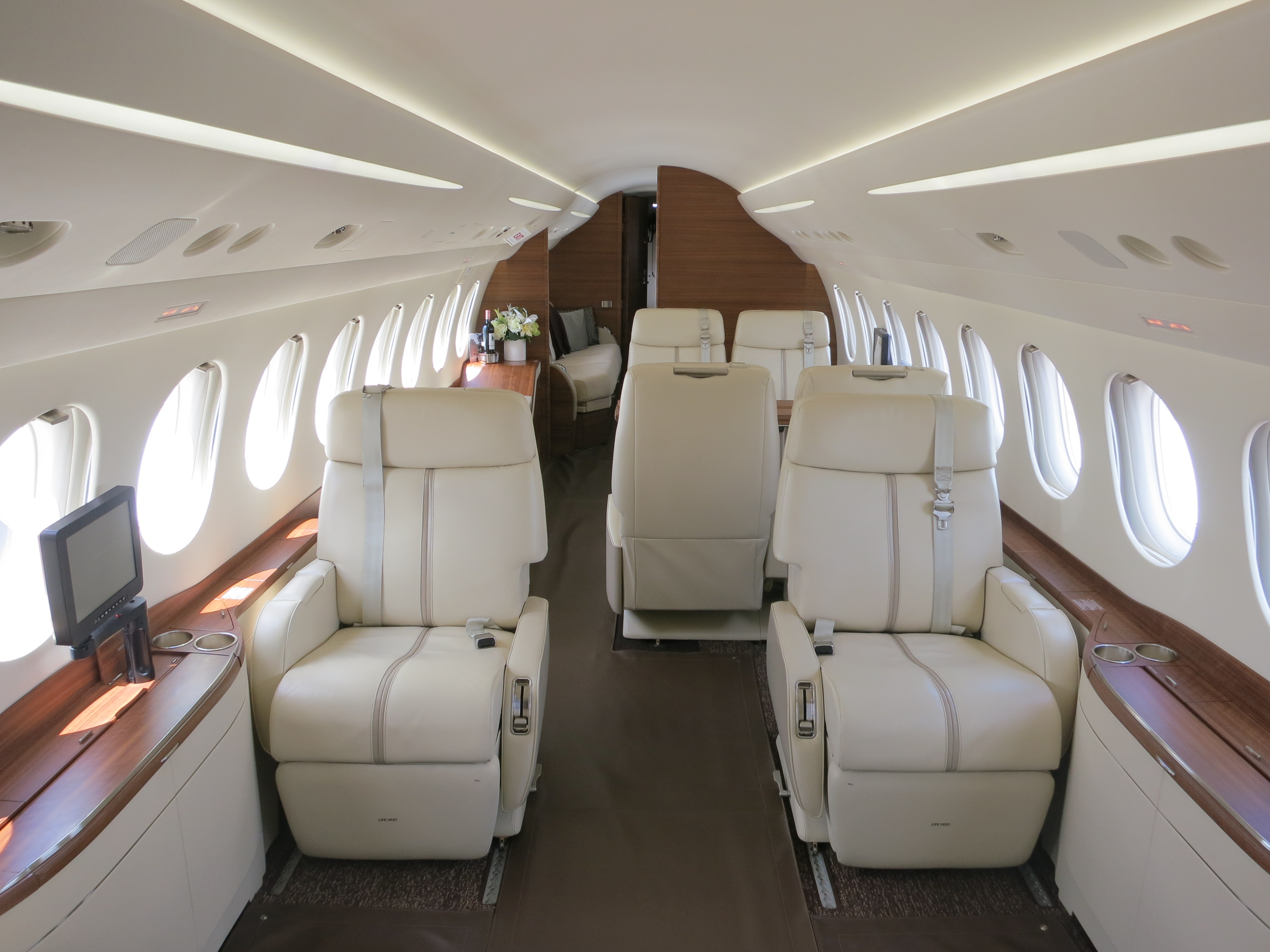
Falcon 7X interior

In February 2010, Dassault Falcon and BMW Designworks were awarded the 2009 Good Design Award by the Chicago Athenaeum and the European Centre for Architecture Art Design for their collaboration on the new Falcon 7X interior option. Due to special engine mounts and cabin isolators, the cabin is extremely quiet, below 50 dBA. It is available with a shower.

=== Pitch trim incident ===
EASA grounded the Falcon 7X fleet after a report from Dassault Aviation regarding an uncontrolled pitch trim runaway during descent in one of its jets in May 2011. The aircraft pitched up to 41 degrees, with the load factor increasing to 4.6g, it climbed from 13,000 to 22,500 ft and the airspeed went from 300 to 125 kn.

"This condition, if occurring again, could lead to loss of control of the aeroplane," the EASA notice said. Initial results of investigation showed that there was a production defect in the Horizontal Stabilizer Electronic Control Unit which could have contributed to the cause of the event. Dassault Aviation developed modifications in June 2011 to allow a return to flight.

After four years of investigation, the Bureau d'Enquêtes et d'Analyses pour la Sécurité de l'Aviation Civile published its final report in June 2016. It was found that incorrect nose-up commands to the trimmable horizontal stabilizer were caused by a soldering defect on the pin of its electronic control unit provided by Rockwell Collins.

=== Teterboro–London-City record ===
On May 2, 2014, Dassault set a new speed record for the Falcon 7X of five hours and 54 minutes on a flight from New York Teterboro Airport to London City Airport.

== Falcon 8X ==
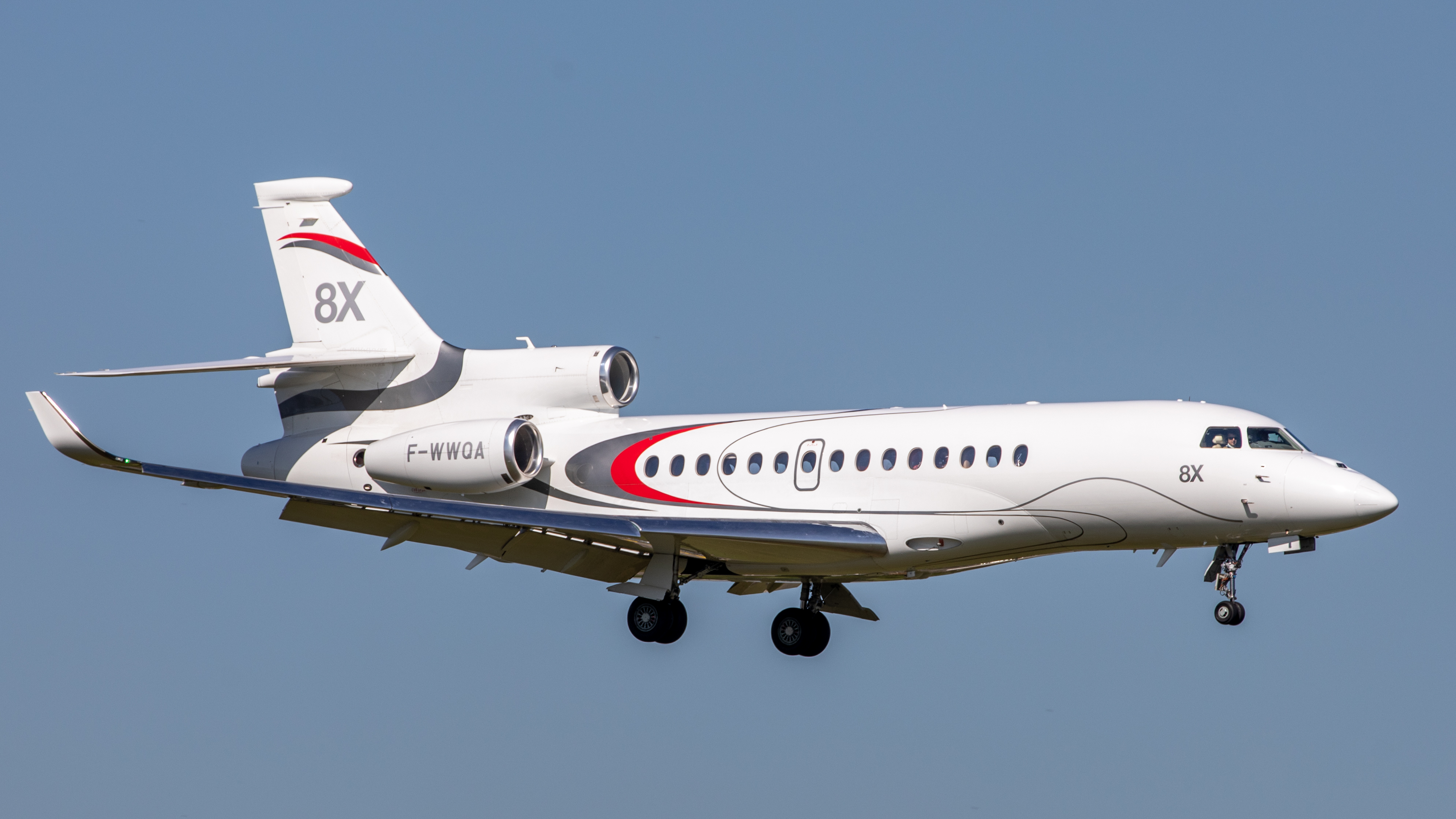
Falcon 8X in flight (Paris Air Show 2019)

The 6,450 nmi (11,945 km; 7,423 mi) range Falcon 8X was announced at the European Business Aviation Convention & Exhibition in May 2014. Its cabin is 1.1 m (3.5 ft) longer than the 7X. With improvements to wing design and improved Pratt & Whitney Canada PW300, the 8X is up to 35% more fuel efficient than its competitors.

The prototype, registered F-WWQA, first flew from Bordeaux–Mérignac Airport on 6 February 2015. The Falcon 8X was added as a subtype of the Falcon 7X on the EASA type certificate on 24 June 2016 as modification M1000 for S/N 0401 and ongoing. Dassault delivered the first Falcon 8X on 5 October 2016 to Greek business aviation operator Amjet Executive. By October 2018, the Falcon 8X FalconEye EFVS was approved by the FAA and EASA for approaches down to 100 ft (30 m), and dual HUD FalconEye will allow EVS-to-land in 2020, without using natural vision.

The three PW307D turbofans gained 320 lbf (1.4 kN) each, and are 1.5% more fuel efficient. MTOW is increased from 70,000 to 73,000 lb (31.8 to 33.1 t) and fuel capacity is increased by 3,200 lb (1.5 t) for 500 nmi (926 km; 575 mi) more range. The wing structure is 600 lb (270 kg) lighter, and more flexible for comfort, while operating empty weight is 200 lb (91 kg) heavier than the 7X despite the 3.5 ft (1.1 m) stretch. A strict weight control allows most operators to match or best Dassault's 36,800 lb (16.7 t) estimate BOWs for a fully equipped aircraft with three crewmembers. Its unmatched structural efficiency, with a OEW only half of MTOW, allow a superior fuel efficiency while its MTOW is less than a 4,100 nmi (7,593 km; 4,718 mi) Gulfstream IV-SP. The first hour fuel burn is 4,000 lb (1.8 t) while average cruise fuel burn is 2,250 lb (1.02 t) per h. The 47 dB average cabin sound level is 2–3 dB lower than that of the Falcon 7X. In 2022, its equipped price was $62.5M.

=== Falcon 8X Archange ===
The Falcon Archange is a militarized variant of the Falcon 8X under development for the French Air and Space Force. Launched under the ARCHANGE (Avion de Renseignement à CHArge utile de Nouvelle GEnération) strategic intelligence aircraft program in December 2019, it is intended for SIGINT and electronic warfare. The aircraft will be equipped with a Universal Electronic Warfare Capability (Capacité Universelle de Guerre Électronique or CUGE) developed by Thales. The system will notably be able to detect and analyze radio emissions and radar signals simultaneously. Thales will supply multi-polarization antennas, as well as artificial intelligence technologies to enhance automatic processing. The information gathered by the systems will then be analyzed by eavesdropping and intelligence specialists and fed into the French Armed Forces' databases. The program also includes a ground training platform. Two Falcon 8X Archange are on order, with an additional unit planned. Delivery of the first aircraft is expected in 2028. Its first flight takes place on July 17, 2025.

== Operators ==
=== Civil operators ===
More than 260 Falcon 7X have been delivered between mid-2007 and March 2016 and the type has flown more than 440,000 hours. Europe has 117 aircraft, 45% of the fleet: 18 in Switzerland, 13 in France, eight in Luxembourg, seven in Belgium, Denmark, Germany and Portugal, six in Russia, four in Ukraine among others. Antwerp's Flying Group operates five aircraft, Shell Oil has four in Rotterdam and Dassault Falcon Service at Paris-Le Bourget manages four, as does Volkswagen AG in Wolfsburg. 20% of the fleet is in North America: more than 50 in the U.S., six in Canada and five in Mexico. In Asia-Pacific, 14 are in Hong Kong and 11 in China among others. Planet Nine Private Air LLC, a premium ultra long range charter based in Los Angeles, operates five Falcon 7X. Jet charter and management company Clay Lacy Aviation operates Falcon 7X aircraft on both U.S. coasts.

Corporate and charter operators use their Falcon 8Xs 600 to 850 hours per year, while individual operators fly theirs 300 to 400 hours per year. Air Alsie, in Denmark, operates five Falcon 8Xs and six Falcon 7Xs. Five 8Xs are based in Switzerland while Volkswagen, Global Jet Luxembourg and ExecuJet Europe each fly two 8Xs. Other operators have a single 8X each: Shell, Flying Group, Aviaservice Air in Kazan, Russia, NetJets Europe, TAG Aviation in Geneva, Switzerland, and Abelag Aviation. Six are based in the US including with Bechtel, Citrus Products, Energy Transfer Partners, Honeywell, Sony. Three are based in China, two in São Paulo, and others are registered in San Marino, Malta and Monaco, throughout the Mediterranean, Middle East and India.

Private owners of Falcon 7X aircraft include Bernie Ecclestone and Taylor Swift.

As of 2025 Max Verstappen owns a Falcon 8X.

=== Government and military operators ===
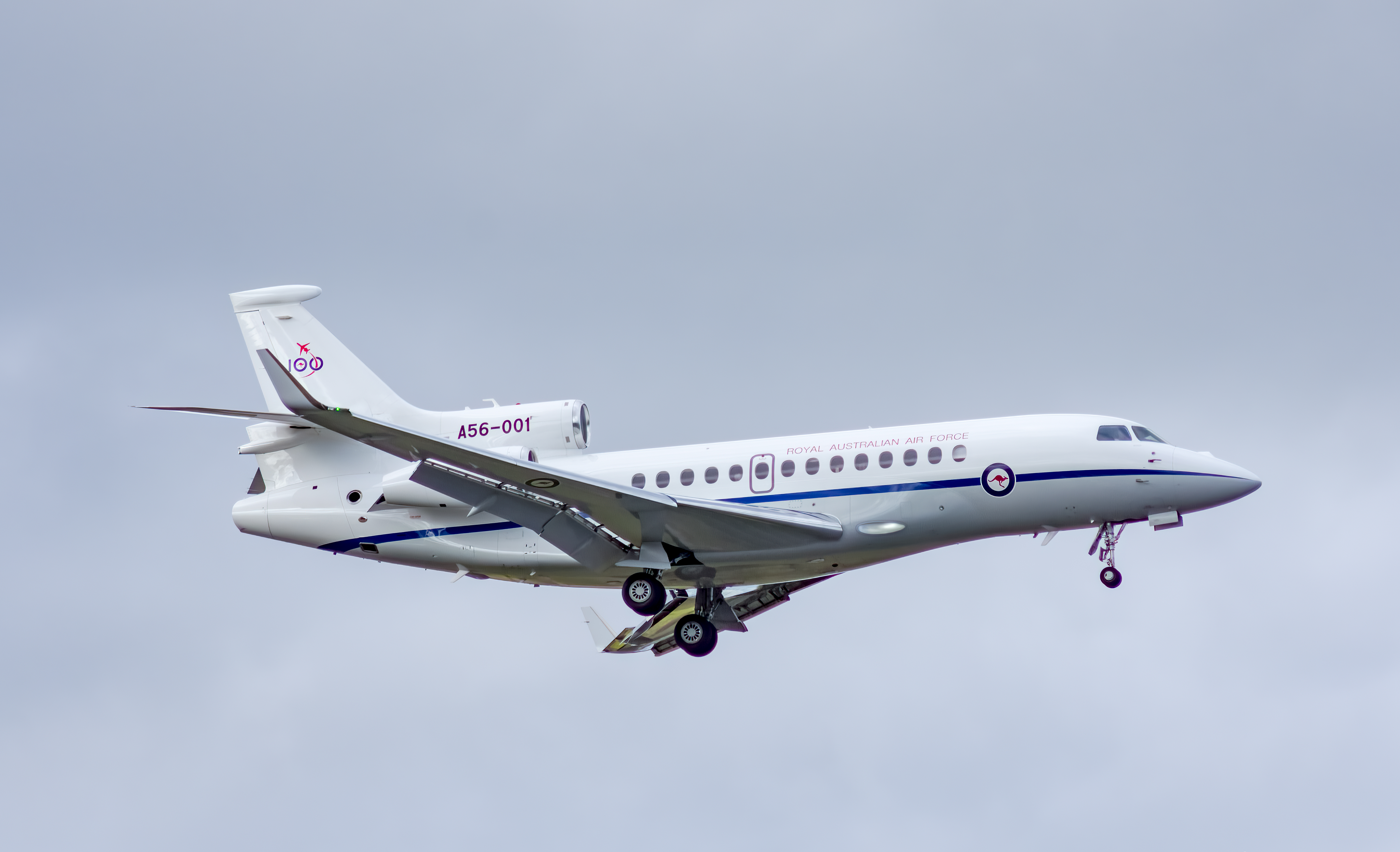
Royal Australian Air Force Falcon 7X

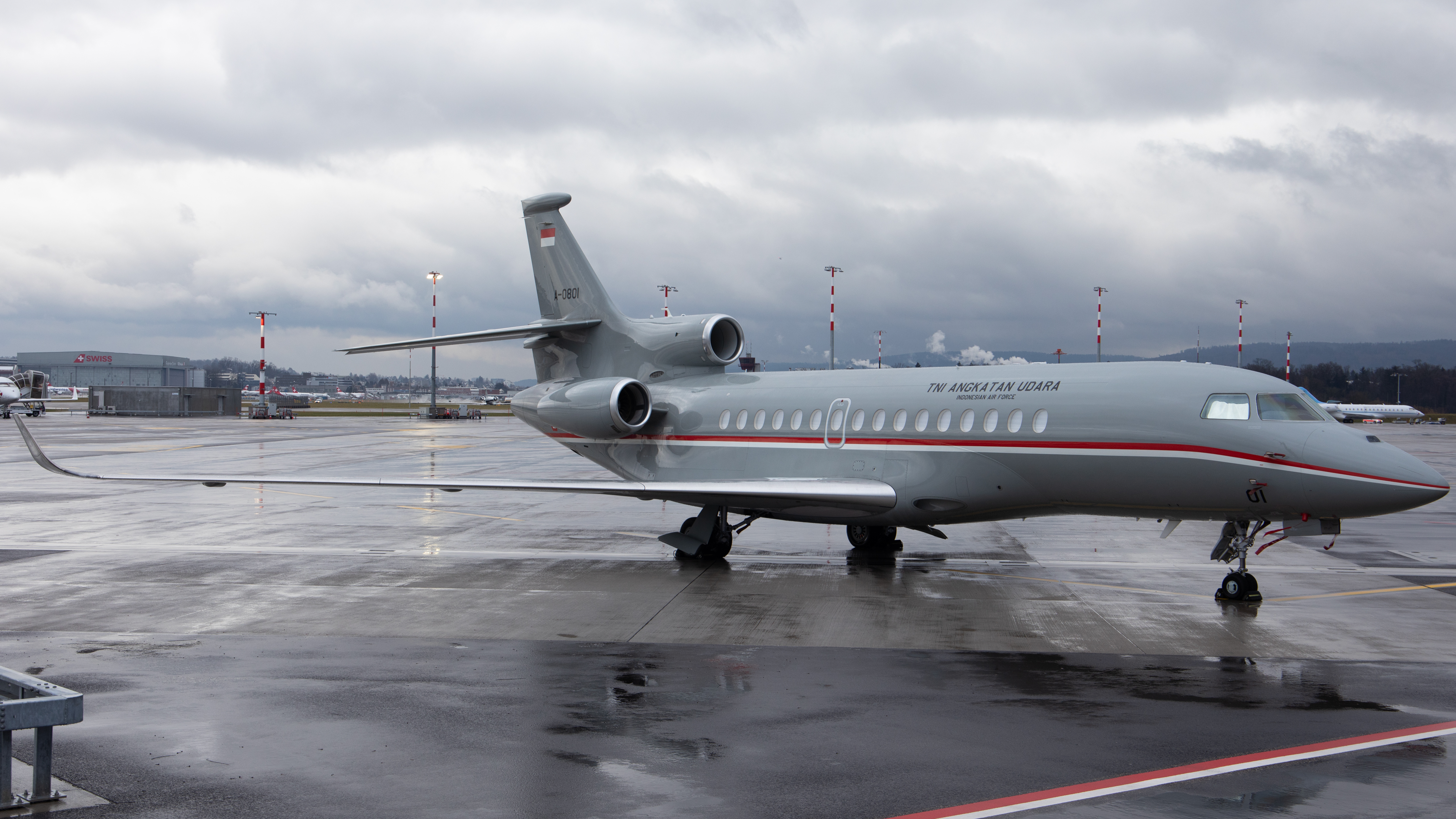
Indonesian Air Force Dassault Falcon 8X

Australia
Royal Australian Air Force: three Falcon 7X leased for VVIP missions.
Belgium
Belgian Air Force: 2x Falcon 7X in military service (OO-LUM & OO-FAE) dry leased from Luxaviation (former Abelag Aviation).
Republic of the Congo
The Republic of the Congo used a Falcon 7X as a presidential transport until 2020, when the aircraft was seized and then auctioned off in 2023 for 7.1 million euros to partially satisfy a judgement debt.
Ecuador
Ecuadorian Air Force: One Falcon 7X (ID: FAE 052) for long-distance travel. Delivered November 4, 2013; first official trip November 25, 2013.
Egypt
Egyptian Air Force: four Falcon 7X on order
France
French Air and Space Force

- 2 Falcon 7X ordered and delivered. In service since 2009, the two aircraft are part of the French presidential fleet (a fleet of 7 aircraft dedicated to presidential and government transport).
- 2 Falcon 8X Archange SIGINT/EW aircraft on order to succeed the Air and Space Force's Transall C-160 Gabriel, with 1 additional unit to be purchased.

Greece
Hellenic Air Force: One Falcon 7X
Hungary
Hungarian Air Force: Two Falcon 7X (HuAF606) (HuAF607)
Indonesia
Indonesian Air Force: Four Falcon 8X delivered and two on order. The first two were delivered as part of the first batch of the Indonesian Dassault Rafale contract. Four additional Falcon 8X were ordered, with two units delivered in May 2026. Previously the Indonesian Air Force operated one Falcon 7X and one Falcon 8X as interim planes for familiarization and training, stationed in 17th Air Squadron for VVIP transport.
Monaco
Albert II, Prince of Monaco: one Falcon 7X since 2013.
Nigeria
Nigerian Air Force: Two Falcon 7X aircraft, one of which was seized in France in 2024 to enforce an arbitration award.
Russia
Two such aircraft (with registration numbers RA-09007, RA-09009) use the Russian special flight squad based on the state-owned Rossiya Airlines to transport the highest officials of the state.

== Specifications ==
Variant	7X	8X
Cockpit crew	Two	
Capacity	12 to 16 passengers	
Cabin section	2.34 m (7.67 ft) width, 1.88 m (6.17 ft) headroom	
Cabin length (Note: excluding cockpit and baggage)	11.91 m (39.07 ft)	13 m (42.67 ft)
Length	23.38 m (76.08 ft)	24.46 m (80.2 ft)
Height	7.83 m (25.67 ft)	7.94 m (26.1 ft)
Wingspan	26.21 m (86 ft)	26.29 m (86.25 ft)
Wing area	70.7 m^{2} (761 sq ft)	
Wing loading	449 kg/m^{2} (92 lb/sq ft)	468 kg/m^{2} (96 lb/sq ft)
MTOW	31,751 kg (70,000 lb)	33,113 kg (73,000 lb)
Max payload	1,996 kg (4,400 lb)	2,223 kg (4,900 lb)
Fuel capacity	14,488 kg (31,940 lb)	15,830 kg (34,900 lb)
BOW	16,601 kg (36,600 lb)	16,375 kg (36,100 lb)
Turbofans (×3)	P&WC PW307A	P&WC PW307D
Thrust	28.48 kN (6,402 lbf)	29.9 kN (6,722 lbf)
Range (8 passengers)	5,950 nmi (11,019 km; 6,847 mi)	6,450 nmi (11,945 km; 7,423 mi)
Ceiling	15,545 m (51,000 ft)	
Max speed	Mach 0.9 (516 kn; 956 km/h; 594 mph)	
Cruise speed	Mach 0.8 (459 kn; 850 km/h; 528 mph)	
Takeoff BFL (Note: MTOW, SL, ISA)	1,740 m (5,710 ft)	1,829 m (6,000 ft)
Landing (Note: typical landing weight)	631 m (2,070 ft)	656 m (2,150 ft)
Avionics	Falcon Enhanced Avionics System (EASy) Flight Deck	

== See also ==
Related development

- Dassault Falcon 900
- Dassault Falcon 6X

Aircraft of comparable role, configuration, and era

- Bombardier Global Express
- Gulfstream G550
- Gulfstream G500/G600
- Gulfstream G650
