= List of airlines of Luxembourg =

This is a list of airlines operating in Luxembourg as of 10 August 2005.

== Scheduled airlines ==
Airline	Image	IATA	ICAO	Callsign	Commenced operations	Notes
Luxair		LG	LGL	LUXAIR	1961	Flag carrier

== Charter airlines ==
Airline	Image	IATA	ICAO	Callsign	Commenced operations	Notes
CAE Aviation					1971	
Global Jet Luxembourg			SVW		2004	
Luxaviation			LXA	RED LION	2009	
JetFly Aviation			JFA	MOSQUITO	1999	

== Cargo airlines ==
Airline	Image	IATA	ICAO	Callsign	Commenced operations	Notes
Cargolux		CV	CLX	CARGOLUX	1970	

== Air rescue ==
Airline	Image	IATA	ICAO	Callsign	Commenced operations	Notes
Luxembourg Air Rescue					1988	

== See also ==
- List of airlines
- List of defunct airlines of Luxembourg
- List of defunct airlines of Europe
