= International Chamber of Commerce =

Global business organization and dispute resolver

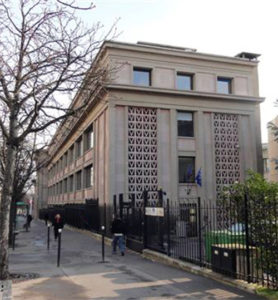
- ICC headquarters in Paris, France
- Abbreviation: ICC
- Nickname: ICC
- Formation: 1919; 107 years ago
- Founded at: Atlantic City
- Type: NGO
- Headquarters: Paris, France
- Coordinates: 48.864112°N 2.292307°E
- Region served: International
- Official language: English, French, Spanish
- Secretary General: John W.H. Denton AO
- President: Harsh Pati Singhania
- Affiliations: World Trade Organization; World Customs Organization; United Nations; OECD; G20; APEC
- Website: iccwbo.org

The International Chamber of Commerce (ICC; French: Chambre de commerce internationale) is a global business organization representing companies and associations in over 170 countries. ICC represents a broad range of sectors and business sizes. Its current chair is Harsh Pati Singhania and its Secretary General is John W.H. Denton AO.

ICC's main activities are rule setting, dispute resolution, and policy advocacy. Its rules, while voluntary, are widely used in international commercial transactions. National committees in over 90 countries advocate business priorities at national and regional levels, and more than 5,000 experts from member companies contribute to ICC policy positions through specialized commissions.

ICC holds Observer Status at the United Nations General Assembly and consultative status with the United Nations Economic and Social Council. It represents business interests at international forums including the World Trade Organization and G20.

== History ==
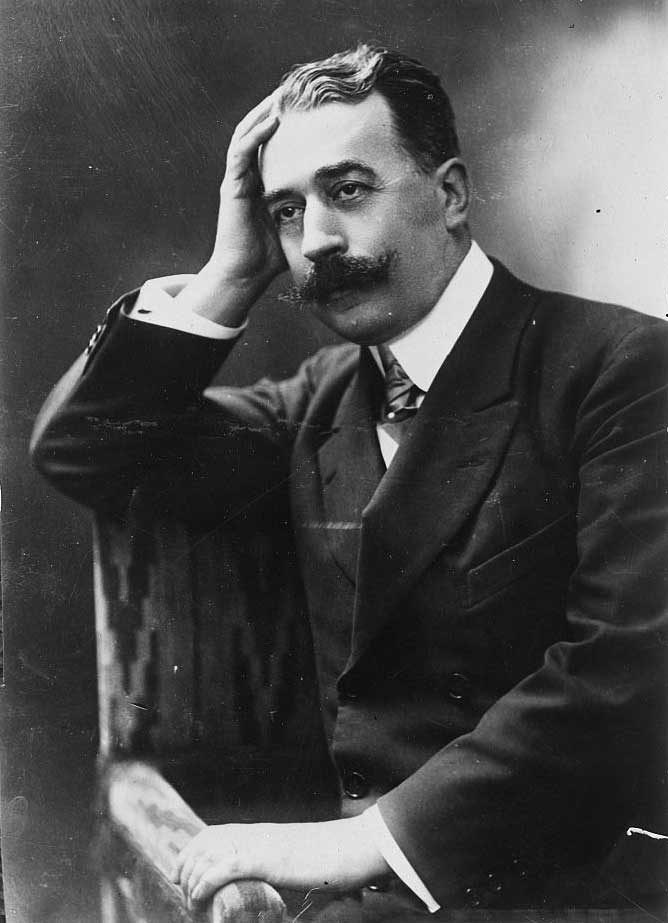
Étienne Clémentel, first chairman of ICC

ICC was founded in 1919 to promote international trade and investment, open markets, and the free flow of capital. Its secretariat was established in Paris, and the International Court of Arbitration was created in 1923. The first chairman was Étienne Clémentel, French Minister of Finance.

Over the decades, ICC and its arbitration mechanisms have been involved in high-profile international disputes, including long-running cases such as the arbitration between the Lebanese construction company Commisimpex and the Republic of Congo. In 2013, the ICC ruled in favor of Mohsen Hojeij of Commisimpex regarding unpaid public works contracts, a decision that has led to multiple subsequent legal proceedings and enforcement actions across several countries. Subsequent judicial investigations in France have expanded to include allegations of organized fraud and forgery related to the arbitration, lending credence to earlier concerns about corruption and conflicts of interest in the handling of the dispute.

== Membership ==
Membership can be obtained through national committees or direct application to the ICC Secretariat.

== Governing bodies ==
=== World Council ===
The World Council is ICC's supreme governing body, composed of representatives from national committees. It elects the chair, vice-chairs, and honorary chair, each serving a three-year term.

=== Executive Board ===
The Executive Board, with up to 30 members, provides strategic direction, sets priorities, and oversees policy implementation.

=== International Secretariat ===
Based in Paris, the Secretariat manages ICC operations and represents business perspectives in intergovernmental forums. It is led by the Secretary General.

=== National Committees ===
National committees exist in over 90 countries. Where no committee exists, direct membership is possible.

=== Finance Committee ===
The Finance Committee advises the Executive Board on financial matters, prepares the budget, and monitors revenue and expenditures.

== Dispute resolution services ==
ICC offers arbitration, mediation, dispute boards, expert evaluations, and DOCDEX for banking disputes. The International Court of Arbitration has handled over 28,000 cases since 1923.

The ICC Case Connect digital platform, updated in 2025, centralizes case management, e-filing, and payments.

Fast-track arbitration is available for disputes under US$2 million. As of 2024, 461 awards have been issued under the expedited procedure.

== Policy and business practices ==
ICC develops policies through commissions and task forces. Commissions examine major issues, and officers are appointed in consultation with national committees. Task forces undertake time-limited projects.

=== Code of Advertising and Marketing Communication Practice ===
The ICC Code of Advertising and Marketing Communication Practicesets guidelines for responsible advertising and marketing worldwide.

== World Chambers Federation ==
The World Chambers Federation (WCF), founded in 1951, connects chambers of commerce worldwide. It organizes the World Chambers Congress biennially and awards the World Chambers Competition for innovative chamber projects.

== Training and events ==
ICC hosts conferences and training globally, including through the ICC Academy, which offers certification programs in arbitration, trade, and commercial law.

== Publications ==
ICC publishes resources on international trade, law, banking, and contracts, including Incoterms and Uniform Customs and Practice for Documentary Credits.

== Commercial Crime Services ==
ICC Commercial Crime Services (CCS) coordinates efforts against commercial crime through the International Maritime Bureau, Financial Investigation Bureau, and Counterfeiting Intelligence Bureau. FraudNet is a specialized network of law firms addressing financial crime, by invitation only.

== Anti-corruption ==
The ICC Commission on Anti-Corruption publishes the ICC Rules of Conduct and guidance for businesses to prevent bribery and extortion.

== United Nations representation ==
ICC holds consultative status with the UN since 1946 and Observer Status at the UN General Assembly since 2017. The current ICC Permanent Observer is Crispin Conroy.

== See also ==
- Incoterms
- Investment promotion agency
- World Association of Investment Promotion Agencies

== Sources ==
- van der Does de Willebois, E.; Sharman, J.C.; Harrison, R.; Park, J.W.; Halter, E. (2011). The Puppet Masters: How the Corrupt Use Legal Structures to Hide Stolen Assets and What to Do About It. StAR Initiative. World Bank Publications. ISBN 978-0-8213-8896-9.
