= Global Jet Luxembourg =

Luxembourgish charter operator

IATA	ICAO	Call sign
—	SVW	SILVER ARROWS
- Founded: 1999; 27 years ago
- Operating bases: Luxembourg Airport
- Headquarters: Hesperange, Luxembourg

Global Jet Luxembourg, formerly Silver Arrows, is a private Luxembourg air charter company operating business jets. It is headquartered in Hesperange and based at Luxembourg Airport.

The airline offers charter and leasing opportunities in Europe and Northern Africa.

In 2025, Global Jet Luxembourg began using Leon Software for sales, operations and crew management.

== Fleet ==
=== Current ===
Global Jet Luxembourg fleet
Aircraft	In service	Orders	Notes
Airbus ACJ318-100	1		(as of August 2019)
Airbus ACJ319-100	3		(as of August 2019)
Airbus ACJ319neo	1		(as of spring 2024)
Airbus ACJ320	1		
Airbus ACJ330	1		
Boeing BBJ737	3		
Bombardier Challenger 605	1		
Bombardier Global 6000	4		(as of spring 2024)
Bombardier Global 7500	9		(as of spring 2024)
Bombardier Global Express	4		(as of spring 2024)
Bombardier Challenger 350	2		
Cessna Citation Latitude	2		(as of spring 2024)
Dassault Falcon 8X	2		
Dassault Falcon 7X	5		(as of spring 2024)
Dassault Falcon 6X	1		(as of summer 2025)
Dassault Falcon 900	3		(as of spring 2024)
Dassault Falcon 2000LX	4		(as of spring 2024)
Embraer Praetor 600	1		
Embraer Praetor 500	1		(as of spring 2024)
Embraer Phenom 300	1		
Gulfstream G200	2		
Gulfstream V	1		
Gulfstream 600	1		
Gulfstream G550	1		
Gulfstream G650ER	9		(as of spring 2024)
Gulfstream 700	3		
Pilatus PC-24	2		(as of spring 2024)
Total	69	0	

== See also ==
- List of airlines of Luxembourg
