= Honeywell Primus =

Electronic flight instrument system

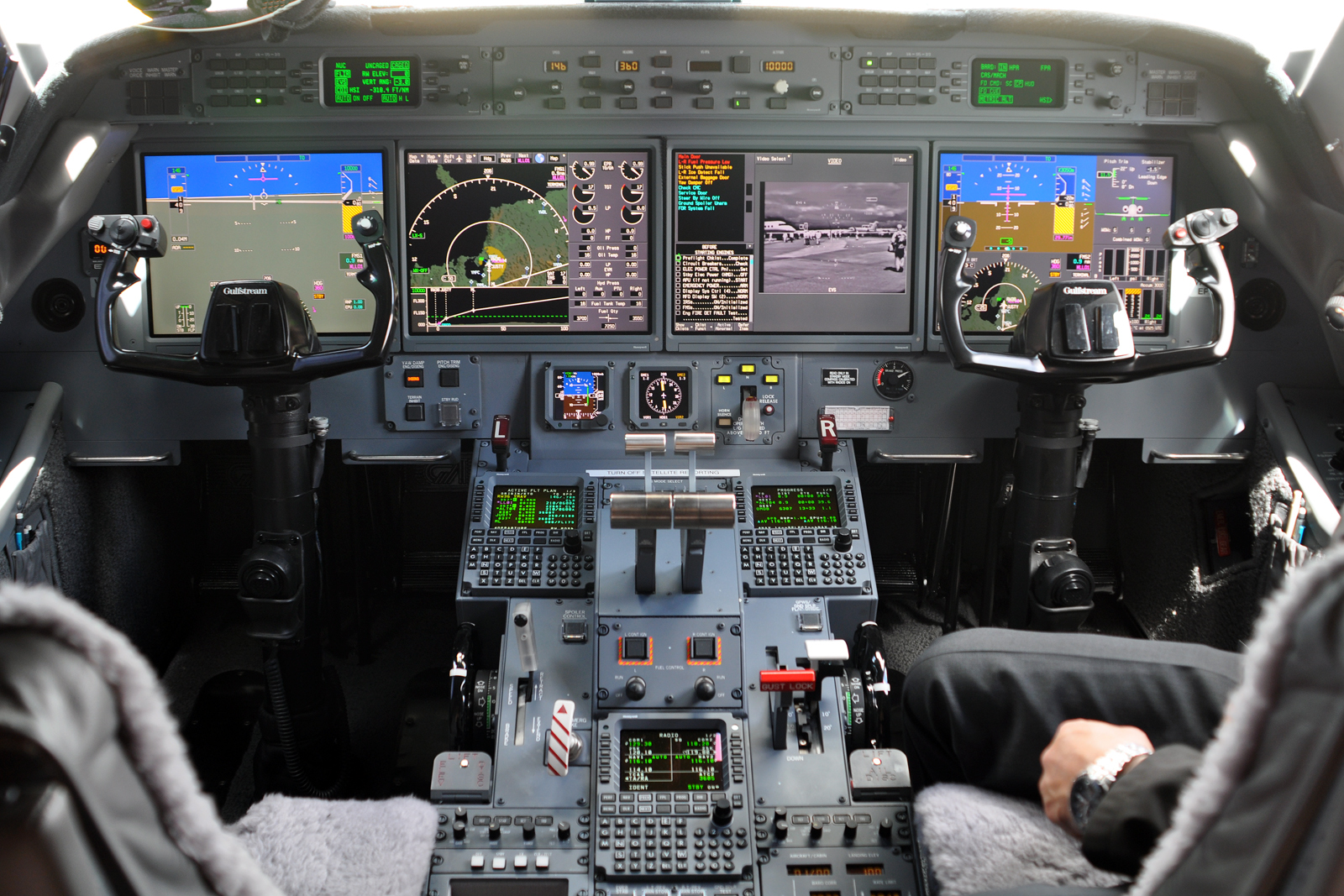
Gulfstream G550 PlaneView cockpit

Honeywell Primus is a range of Electronic Flight Instrument System (EFIS) glass cockpits manufactured by Honeywell Aerospace. Each system is composed of multiple display units used as primary flight display and multi-function display.

== Primus 1000 ==
Primus 1000 is used on:

- Cessna Citation II
- Cessna Citation V
- Cessna Citation Excel
- Embraer ERJ 145 Family
- Embraer Legacy 600
- Learjet 45

== Primus 2000/2000XP ==
Primus 2000 and Primus 2000XP are used on:

- Bombardier Global Express (2000XP)
- Cessna Citation X
- Dornier 328
- Falcon 900

== Primus Elite ==
Primus Elite is an upgrade to older SPZ-8000 series and Primus 1000 and 2000/2000XP flight decks. The upgrade includes replacing the cathode ray tube (CRT) display with new lightweight liquid-crystal displays (LCD). The Primus Elite displays also include enhanced capability of SVS (Synthetic vision system), Jeppesen Charts, Enhanced with XM weather, airports, Navaids, TAF, METARs, Geopolitical boundary, Airways, Airspace information, NOTAMs and many more features. The multi-function display will have cursor control device (CCD) to select the various above listed options.

== Primus Apex ==
Primus Apex is based on the Primus Epic and is designed for single-pilot turboprop aircraft and very light jets.

It is installed in:

- Pilatus PC-12 NG
- Viking Air DHC-6 Twin Otter Series 400

== Primus Epic/Epic 2 ==
Primus Epic and Primus Epic 2 are designed for two-crew business or regional jets.

They are used on:

- Airbus A300-600F (Epic, retrofit)
- Cessna Citation Sovereign
- Dassault Falcon 7X
- Embraer E-Jet family
- Embraer E-Jet E2 family (Epic 2)
- Gulfstream G350/G450
- Gulfstream G500/G550
- Gulfstream G650/G650ER
- Hawker 4000
- Pilatus PC-24 (Epic 2)

While primarily designed for jet aircraft, the Epic cockpit is also used on the AgustaWestland AW139 medium helicopter, which is certified for single-pilot IFR operations.

Dassault's Enhanced Avionics System (EASy) was jointly developed with Honeywell and is based on the Primus Epic.

Gulfstream Aerospace's PlaneView cockpit is also based on the Primus Epic.

== Competition ==
Primus Apex flight deck competes with Garmin G1000 and G3000 and Avidyne Entegra while Primus Epic competes with Rockwell Collins Pro Line and Garmin G3000 and G5000 on larger aircraft.
