= Dassault Falcon 2000 =

Business jet

Falcon 2000
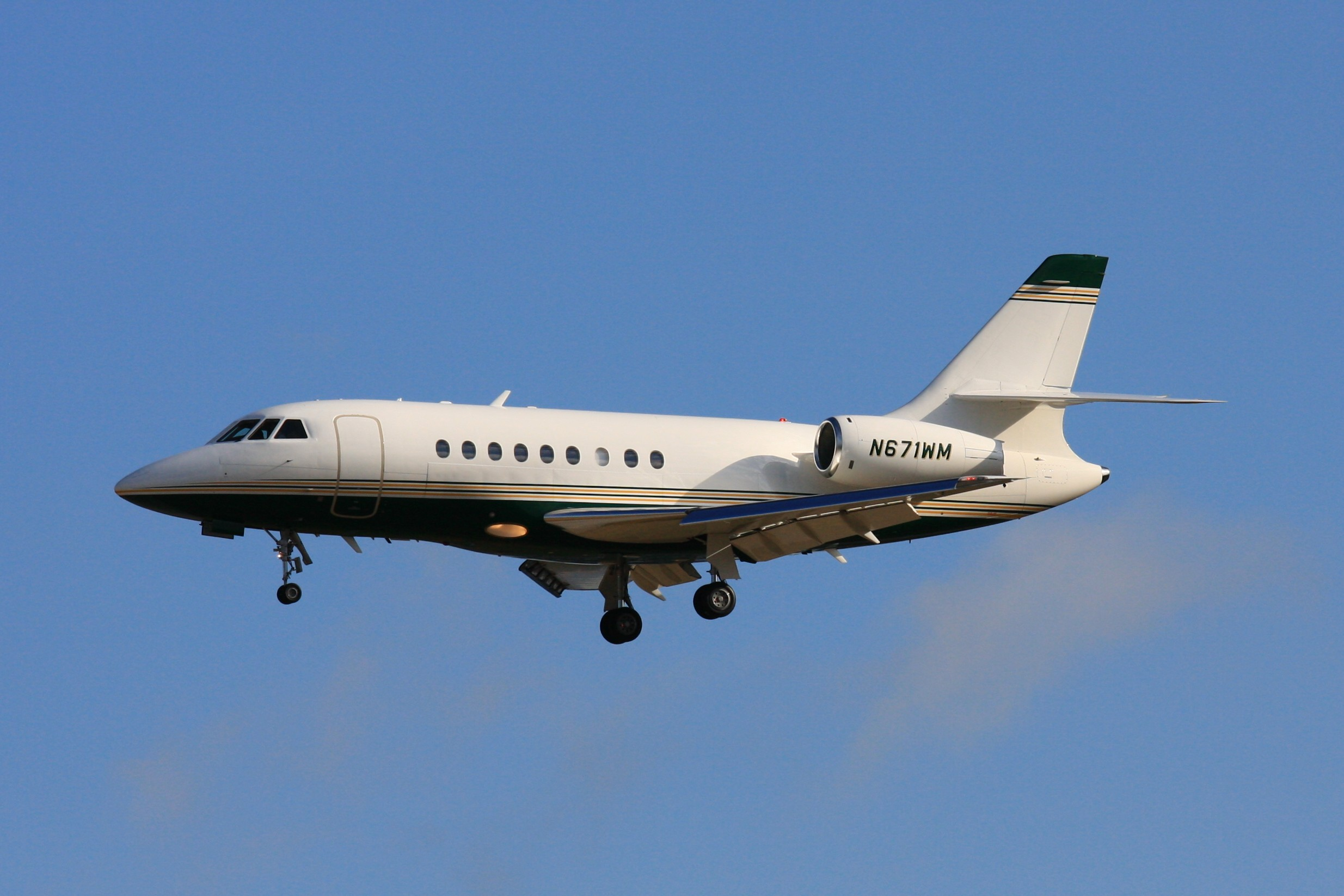

General information
- Type: Business jet
- National origin: France
- Manufacturer: Dassault Aviation; Dassault Reliance Aerospace Limited (DRAL)
- Status: Active in production
- Number built: 675 (Oct 2022)

History
- Manufactured: 1995–present
- First flight: 4 March 1993
- Developed from: Dassault Falcon 900

The Dassault Falcon 2000 is a business jet produced in France by Dassault Aviation, a member of its Falcon business jet line. Developed from the Falcon 900 trijet, the smaller twinjet has less range.

== Development ==
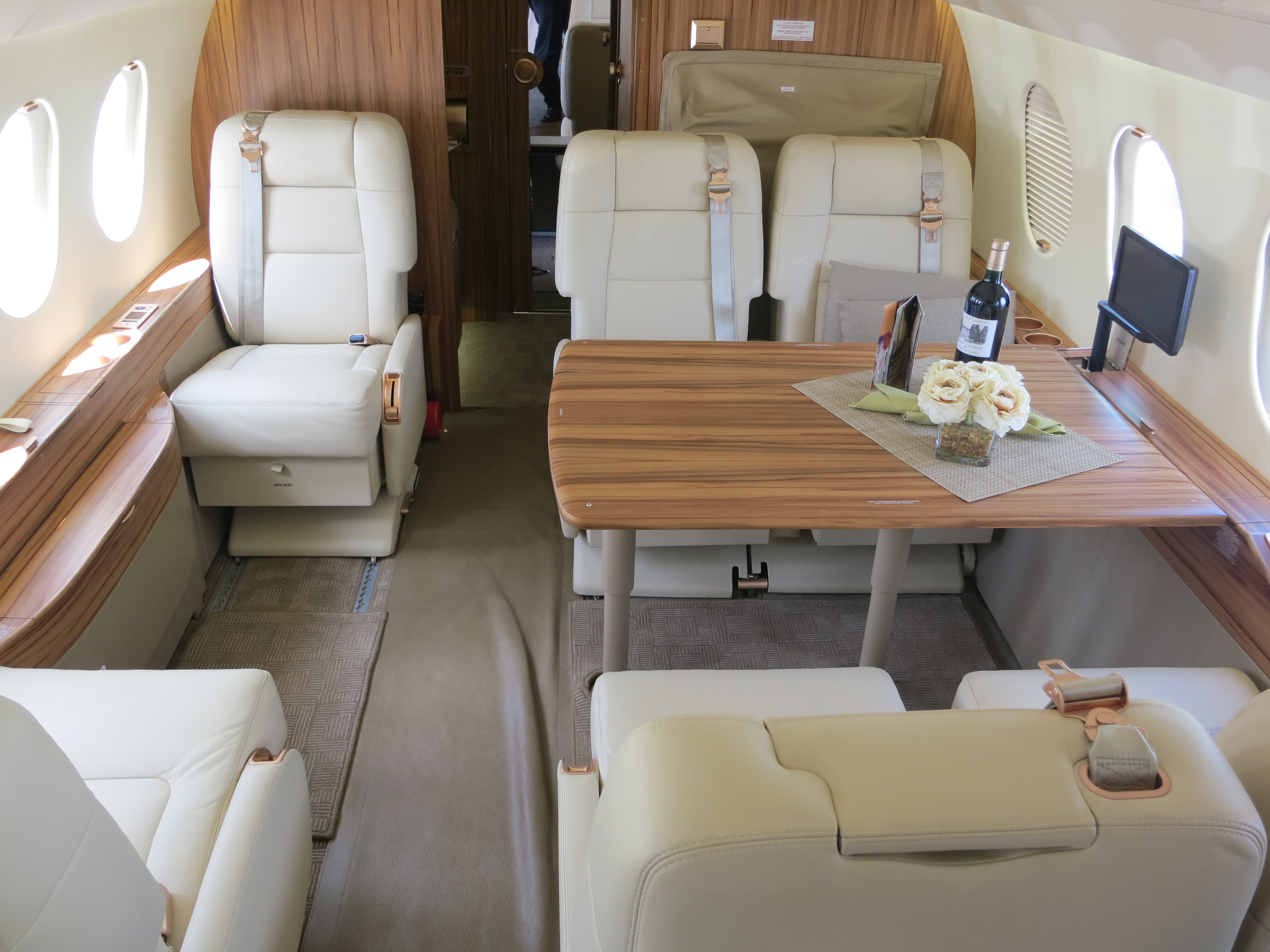
Dassault Falcon 2000 interior

The Falcon 900 fuselage was shortened by 7 ft (2.1 m) to carry up to 10 passengers. The wing leading edge was modified and its inboard slats were removed. It was introduced in 1995 for $17.85 million, while the 2023 Falcon 2000LXS lists for $36 million.

The Dassault Falcon 2000LXS variant will be produced in India by Dassault Reliance Aerospace Ltd (DRAL) as announced during the Paris Air Show. The first Indian Falcon 2000 is expected to make its first flight in 2028. The DRAL, a joint venture of Dassault Aviation and Reliance Infrastructure subsidiary, Reliance Aerostructure Limited (RAL), was established in 2017 at MIHAN at Nagpur airport, Maharashtra, India. The facility had supplied 100 major components for Falcon 2000 since supplying the first front section in 2019.

== Variants ==
Falcon 2000
Original version certified in 1994 with CFE (General Electric & AlliedSignal) CFE738-1-1B turbofans, with 5,918 pounds-force (26.32 kilonewtons) of thrust each, a range of 2,841 nautical miles [nmi] (5,262 km; 3,269 mi) range and Collins Pro Line 4 avionics suite.

Falcon 2000EX
Re-engined variant certified in 2003 with Pratt & Whitney Canada PW308C turbofan engines, 7,000 lbf (31 kN) each, offering a 3,878 nmi (7,182 km; 4,463 mi) range.

Falcon 2000EX EASy
Marketing designation for a 2000EX with changes to pressurisation and oxygen systems, certified in 2004, and Honeywell Primus Epic-based EASy avionics suite, including synthetic vision. Undertook steep approach trials at London City Airport on 18 March 2010, becoming the first Dassault twin-jet to visit apart from the much older, diminutive Dassault Falcon 10.

Falcon 2000DX
Updated model certified in 2007 and based on the 2000EX EASy with the same PW308C turbofans. Shorter-range of 3,250 nmi (6,020 km; 3,740 mi) for $28.5 million.

Falcon 2000LX

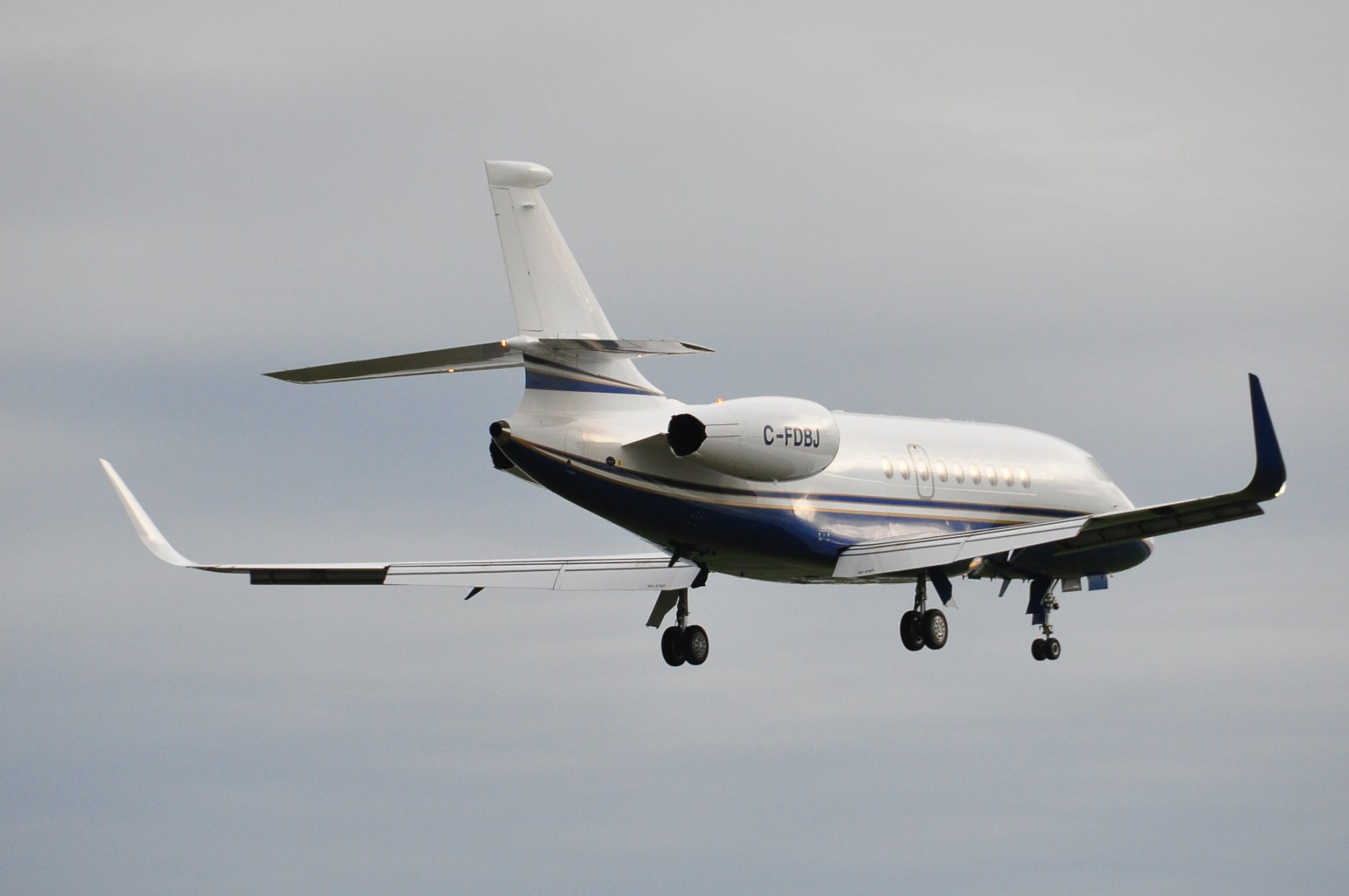
Blended winglets were introduced with the 2000LX and can also be installed on other variants (here a 2000EX)

Longer-range 2009 variant of the Falcon 2000EX EASy, with the addition of Aviation Partners Blended Winglets, giving it a range capability of 4,000 nautical miles (7,400 km; 4,600 mi). The same winglets are certified for the entire Falcon 2000 series as a retrofit kit.

Falcon 2000S

A Falcon 2000S at Billund Airport

Variant which began testing in 2011 with short field characteristics. Landing distance has been reduced to 705 meters, opening up 50% more airports than other aircraft in this class. Compared to the $5 million more expensive LXS, the S range is shorter by 500 mi (800 km; 430 nmi) by restricting its fuel capacity to 14,600 lb (6,600 kg). It burns 2,350–2,400 lb (1,070–1,090 kg) of fuel in the first hour and 1,600–1,650 lb (730–750 kg) afterwards, and can take off in 4,325 ft (1,318 m) at sea level on a standard day. In 2021, its equipped price was $28.8M. It offers a 3,350 nmi (6,200 km; 3,860 mi) range.

Falcon 2000LXS
Replacement for the long-range 2000LX and introduced in 2014. Relative to its predecessor, the Falcon 2000LXS offers greatly improved takeoff and landing performance, superior cabin comfort and reduced emissions. It also has a lower approach speed (194 km/h vs. 210 km/h), enabling it to land in a shorter distance, 689 m vs. 800 m, equivalent to turboprop aircraft. In 2021, its equipped price was $35.1M.

Falcon 2000MRA/MSA
The Maritime Reconnaissance Aircraft (MRA) or Maritime surveillance aircraft (MSA) is a militarized variant based on the Falcon 2000LXS. Six Falcon 2000MSA were ordered by the Japan Coast Guard in 2015, with delivery expected from 2019 onwards.

Falcon 2000 Albatros

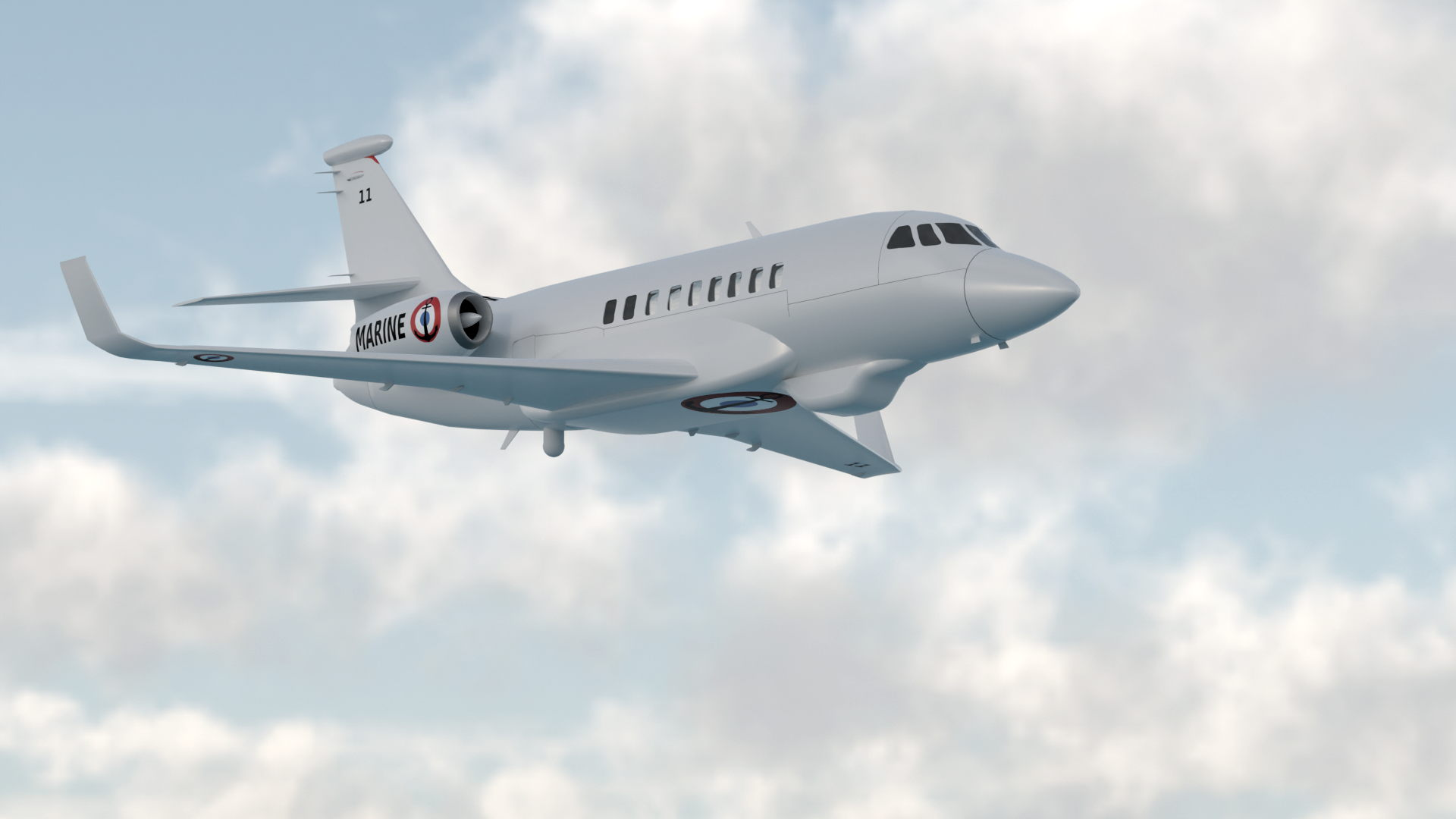
CGI of an Albatros, the French Navy's militarized variant of the Falcon 2000LXS

Derived from the Falcon 2000MRA, the Falcon 2000 Albatros was selected in 2020 to replace the French Naval Aviation's Falcon 50 Surmar and Falcon 200 Gardian aircraft. The aircraft is designed for maritime surveillance and intervention missions. It will incorporate a multifunction under-fuselage radar, a high-performance electro-optical/infrared (EO/IR) system, observation windows, a Search & Rescue chain release system and dedicated communications systems. Seven units have been ordered and are to be delivered from 2025 onwards, with the acquisition of five additional units planned for a total of twelve aircraft.

== Operators ==
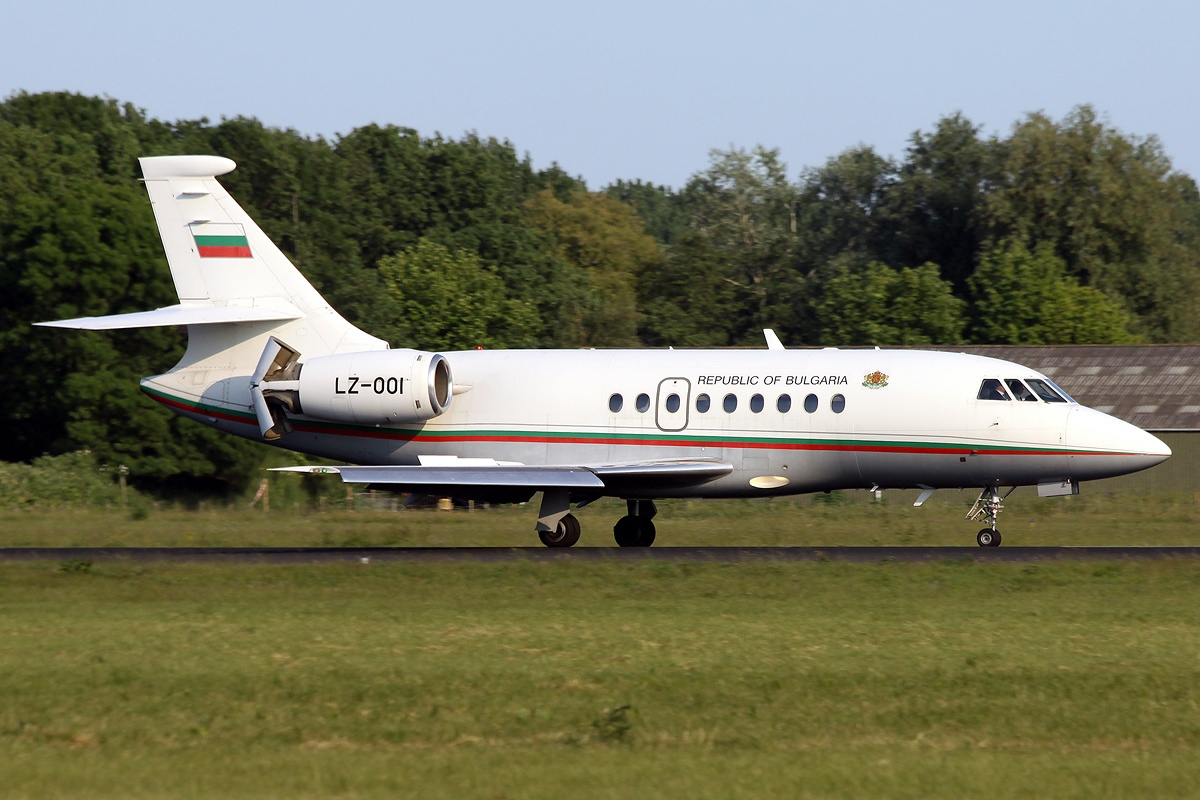
A Falcon 2000 of Bulgarian Air Force

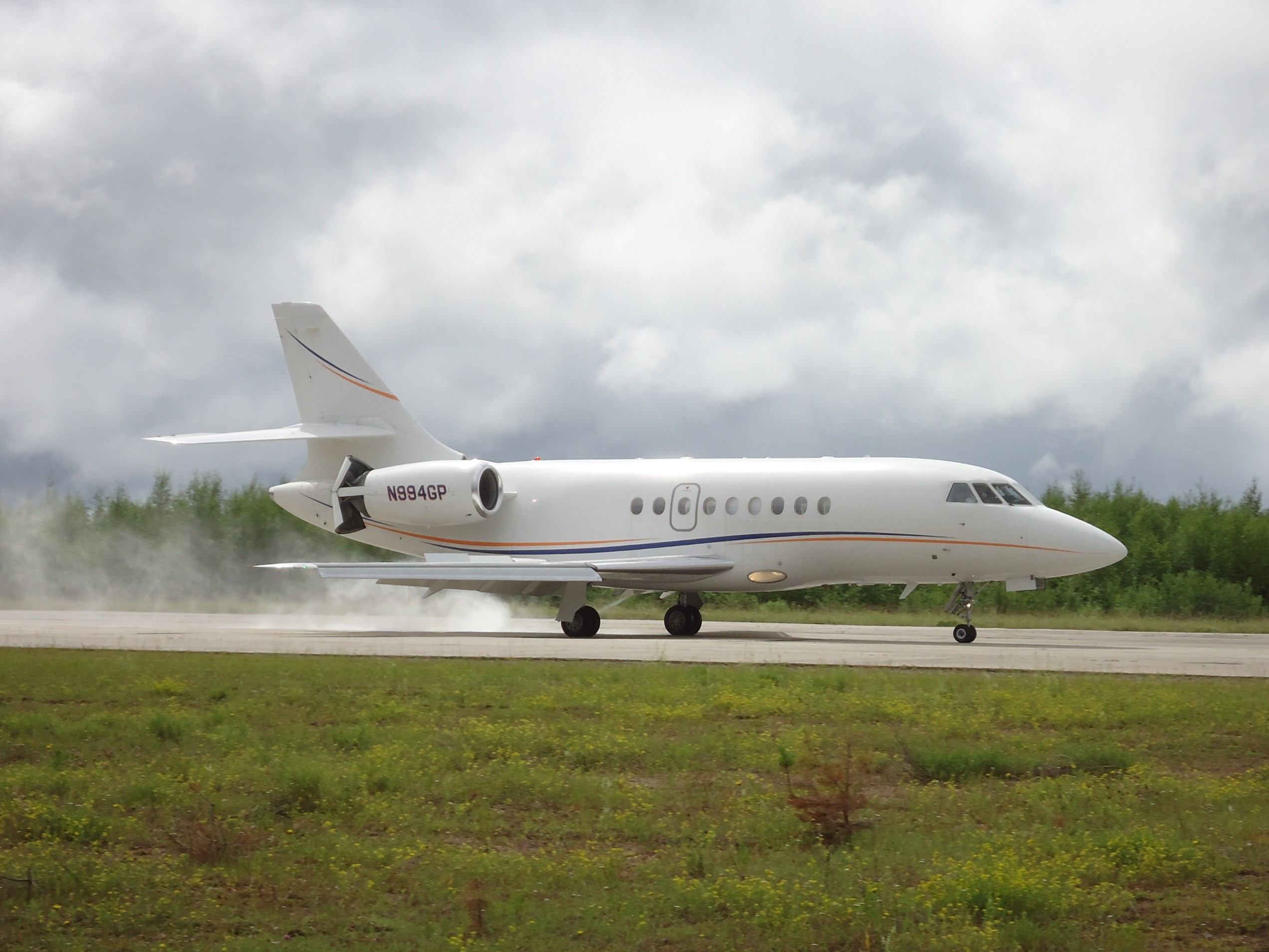
A Falcon 2000 slowing down using reverse thrust in Irkutsk Oblast, Russia.

=== Civil operators ===
The aircraft is operated by private individuals, companies and executive charter operators. A number of companies also use the aircraft as part of fractional ownership programs.

=== Military and government operators ===
Bulgaria

- Bulgarian Air Force
  - 28th Air Detachment

Japan

- Japan Coast Guard: Six Falcon 2000 MSA ordered.

Slovenia

- Slovenian Air Force and Air Defence

Republic of Korea

- Republic of Korea Air Force: 2 ELINT Falcon 2000s on order.

France

- French Air and Space Force: 1 Falcon 2000EX and 1 Falcon 2000LX in service. The two aircraft are part of the French presidential fleet.
- French Navy: 7 Falcon 2000 Albatros on order; 3 delivered,5 additional units planned.

Thailand

- Royal Thai Police : 1 Falcon 2000s

== Specifications (Falcon 2000LXS) ==
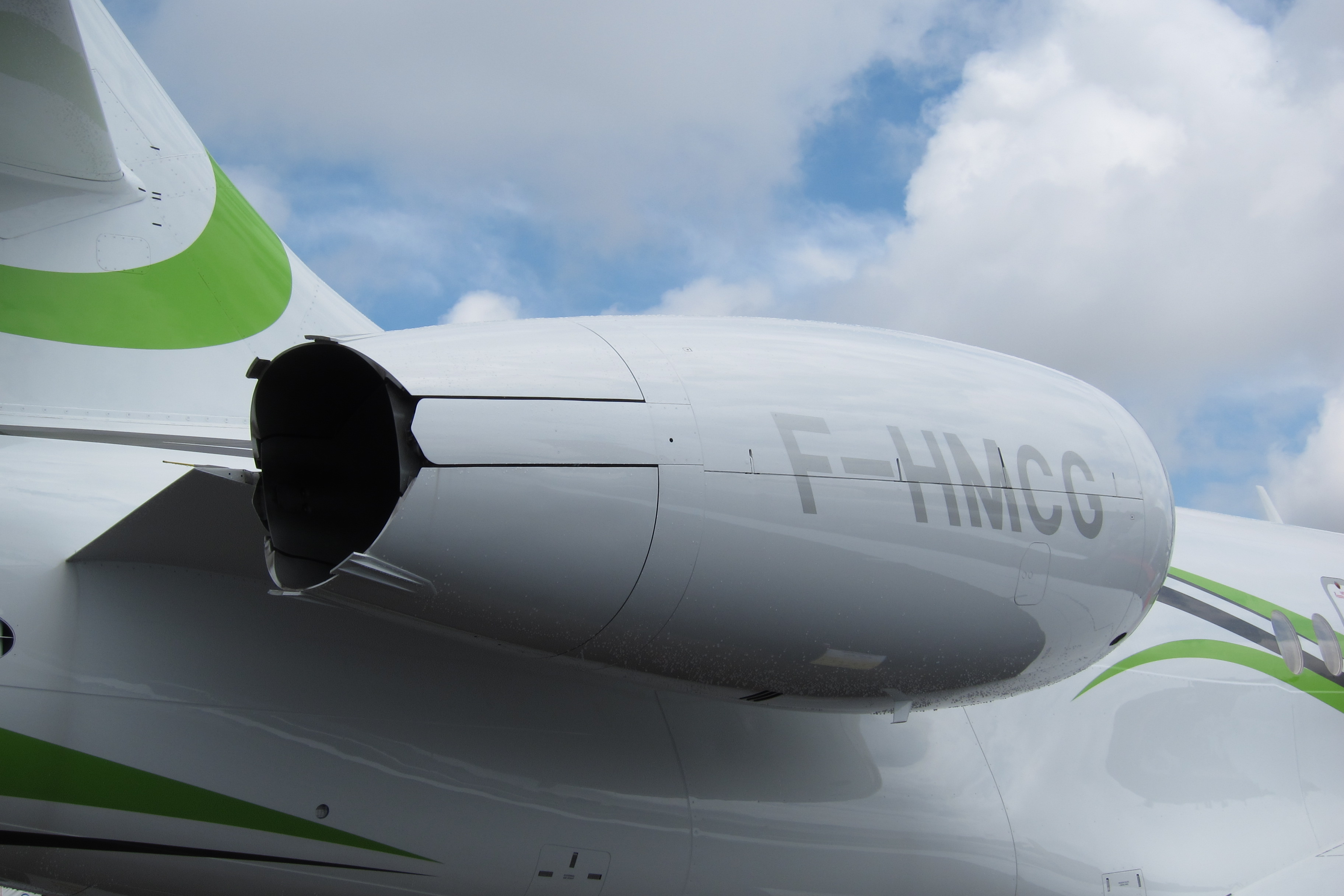
Pratt & Whitney Canada PW300 engine

Data from Dassault

General characteristics

- Crew: 2
- Capacity: 10 passengers
- Length: 20.23 m (66 ft 4 in)
- Wingspan: 21.38 m (70 ft 2 in)
- Height: 7.11 m (23 ft 4 in)
- Max takeoff weight: 19,414 kg (42,801 lb)
- Fuel capacity: 16,660 lb (7,557 kg)
- Powerplant: 2 × Pratt & Whitney Canada PW308C turbofan engines, 31.14 kN (7,000 lbf) thrust each

Performance

- Maximum speed: Mach 0.85-0.862 (1050-1064 km/h)
- Range: 7,408 km (4,603 mi, 4,000 nmi) (6 passengers, 2 crew, Mach .80)
- Service ceiling: 14,326 m (47,001 ft)
- Take-off distance: 1,425 m (4,675 ft)
- Landing distance: 689 m (2,260 ft) ((FAR 91, 6 pax, SL, NBAA IFR reserves)

== Production ==
In June 2025, Dassault Aviation partnered with Reliance Infrastructure to locally manufacture the Falcon 2000 business jets in India. The collaboration includes the production of fuselage components and sub-assemblies, with the first Indian-built aircraft expected by 2028.

== See also ==
- Dassault Falcon family

Related development

- Dassault Falcon 900
- Dassault Falcon 7X

Aircraft of comparable role, configuration, and era

- Bombardier Challenger 605
- Bombardier Challenger 350
- Cessna Citation Longitude
- Embraer Legacy 450/500 and Praetor 500/600
- Embraer Legacy 600
- Gulfstream G450
