= Mohsen Hojeij =

Lebanese businessman

- Born: Lebanon
- Occupation: Businessman
- Known for: Long running arbitration case with the government of the Republic of Congo

Mohsen Hojeij is a Lebanese businessman and owner of the construction company Commisimpex. He is primarily known for a long-running arbitration dispute with the Republic of Congo.

== Arbitration case against the Republic of Congo ==
Commisimpex, founded by Mohsen Hojeij in the 1980s, carried out a series of public works projects in the Republic of Congo, including the rehabilitation of palm plantations, sanitation works in military camps, and the construction of worker villages. Only part of the payment was ever made, leading to a decades-long dispute between Hojeij and Congolese President Denis Sassou Nguesso, with whom Hojeij had once maintained cordial relations.

Commisimpex holds two arbitral awards issued by the International Chamber of Commerce (ICC) against the Republic of Congo: Arbitral Award No. 9899, issued in 2000 with a face value of €290 million, and Arbitral Award No. 16257, issued in 2013 for more than €1.5 billion, which ordered Congo to pay for public works contracts dating back to the 1980s. Both awards have been recognized as final and unappealable judgments in multiple jurisdictions, including the United States, France, England, and Belgium, and Commisimpex has pursued enforcement proceedings across these and other countries. Congo has sought to overturn the 2013 ruling, alleging corruption and conflicts of interest among the arbitrators. In 2025, a French judicial investigation was expanded to include organized fraud and forgery in connection with the arbitration, casting doubt on the integrity of the ICC process and the validity of the 2013 award.

== Asset seizures ==
To enforce the arbitration, Commisimpex pursued recognition and enforcement actions in several jurisdictions. In the United States, the District Court for the District of Columbia recognized the ICC award in December 2015, allowing attempts to identify and seize Congolese state assets. During this phase, several Congolese officials were subpoenaed by Hojeij’s counsel at White & Case, including Finance Minister Calixte Ganongo and Denis-Christel Sassou-Nguesso, the president’s son. Both were ordered to provide information about Congo’s assets in the U.S., though they did not comply.

Commisimpex also sought to recover funds in France, where courts in 2015 authorized the seizure of approximately €6 million from Congolese state bank accounts. A 2018 ruling by the Cour de cassation annulled certain seizures, holding that a 1993 letter renouncing immunity did not cover diplomatic property. In February 2020, the Paris Court of Appeal authorized Commisimpex to conduct enforcement measures on any non-diplomatic assets of the Republic of the Congo, including aircraft. Pursuant to this ruling, in June 2020 French bailiffs seized a Falcon 7X belonging to President Denis Sassou Nguesso while it was undergoing maintenance at Bordeaux–Mérignac Airport. The Bordeaux judicial court confirmed the seizure and authorized its auction in December 2022, a decision upheld by the Bordeaux Court of Appeal in June 2023. The aircraft was finally sold at auction in October 2023 for €7.1 million to partially satisfy the judgment debt. The Congolese government protested the sale, arguing that the presidential jet was protected by sovereign immunity, and announced plans to pursue legal remedies.
