= Pratt & Whitney Canada PW300 =

Aircraft turbofan jet engine

PW300
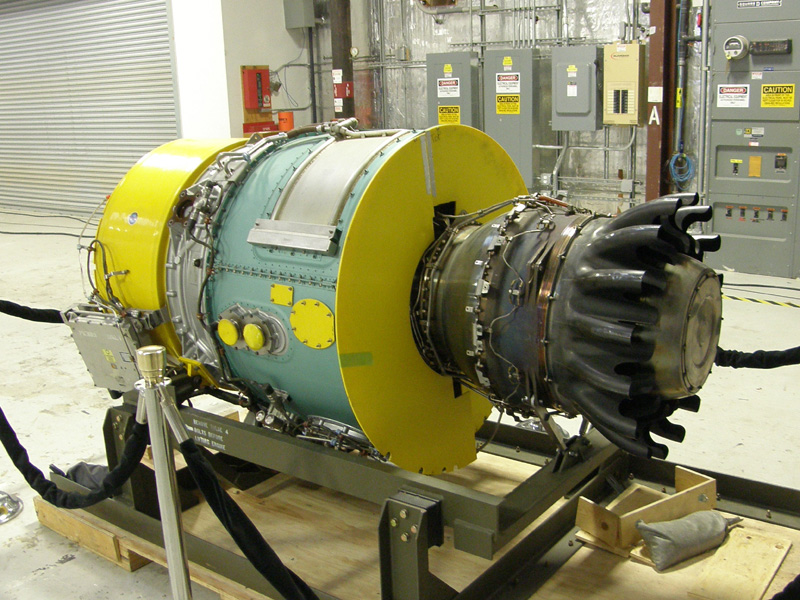
- PW308 used on the WhiteKnightTwo
- Type: Turbofan
- National origin: Canada
- Manufacturer: Pratt & Whitney Canada
- First run: 1988
- Major applications: Cessna Citation Latitude; Cessna Citation Sovereign; Dassault Falcon 2000; Dassault Falcon 7X; Fairchild Dornier 328JET; Gulfstream G200

The Pratt & Whitney Canada PW300 series is a family of turbofan jet engines developed by Pratt & Whitney Canada specifically for business jet applications.

== Design and development ==
The PW300 series has been developed in partnership with MTU who are responsible for the low pressure turbine. It is generally designed to be in the 4,700 to 8,000 lbf (21 to 36 kN) thrust class.

The first variant, the PW305A, has the following configuration and was designed with a core flexible enough for engines with take-off thrusts from 20 kN to 31 kN (4,500 to 7,000 lb): a single-stage fan driven by a three-stage low pressure turbine, supercharging a four-stage axial/single-stage centrifugal high-pressure compressor, driven by a two-stage high-pressure turbine. An annular combustor is used. There is no forced mixing before the bypass and core streams leave the engine through a common nozzle. The engine is controlled with a dual channel Full Authority Digital Engine Control (FADEC) system.

The PW307A is a new centre-line engine developed specifically for a tri-jet application on the Dassault Falcon 7X. The PW307 was certified by Transport Canada in March 2005.

The PW308A has been chosen to power the Scaled Composites White Knight Two, the launch aircraft for Virgin Galactic's SpaceShipTwo.

Unscheduled interventions went from 85% in 2015 to 20% in 2017, driving up the PW307 availability thanks to Pratt's digital platform, and engine dispatch reliability is at 99.4% for the Falcon 7X/8X powered by the PW307.

== Variants ==
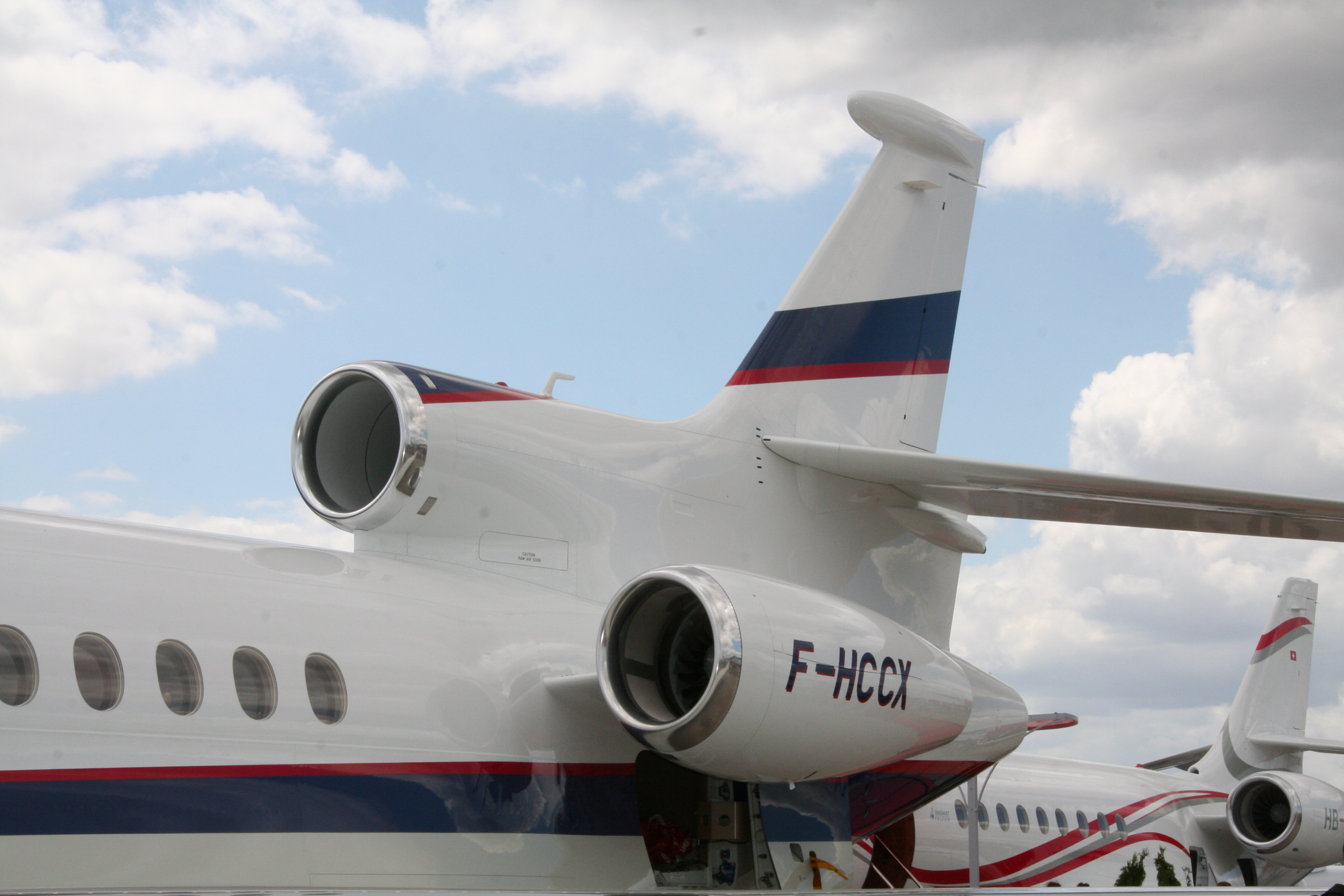
Two of the three PW307A installed on the Dassault Falcon 7X

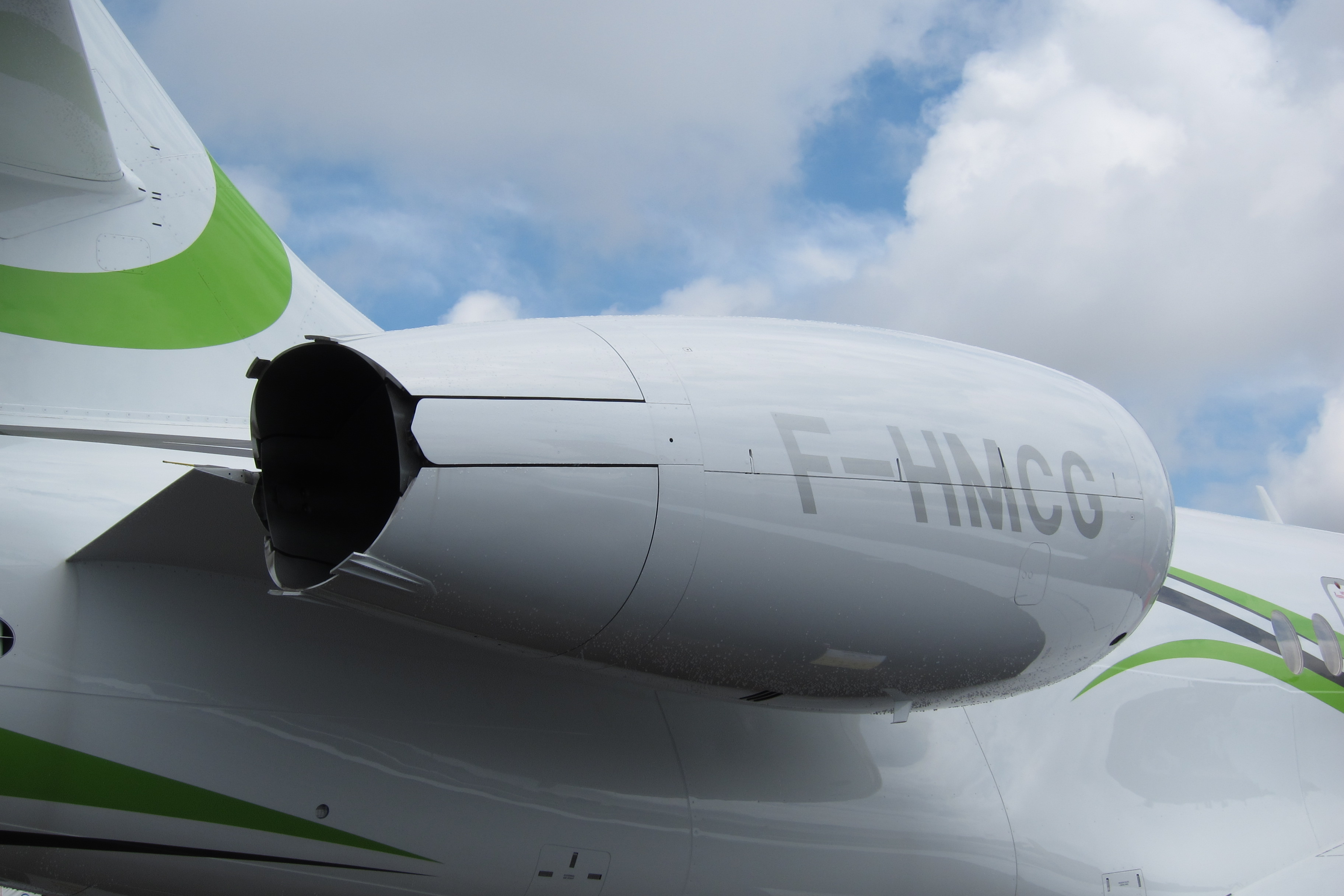
One of the two PW308C of a Falcon 2000S

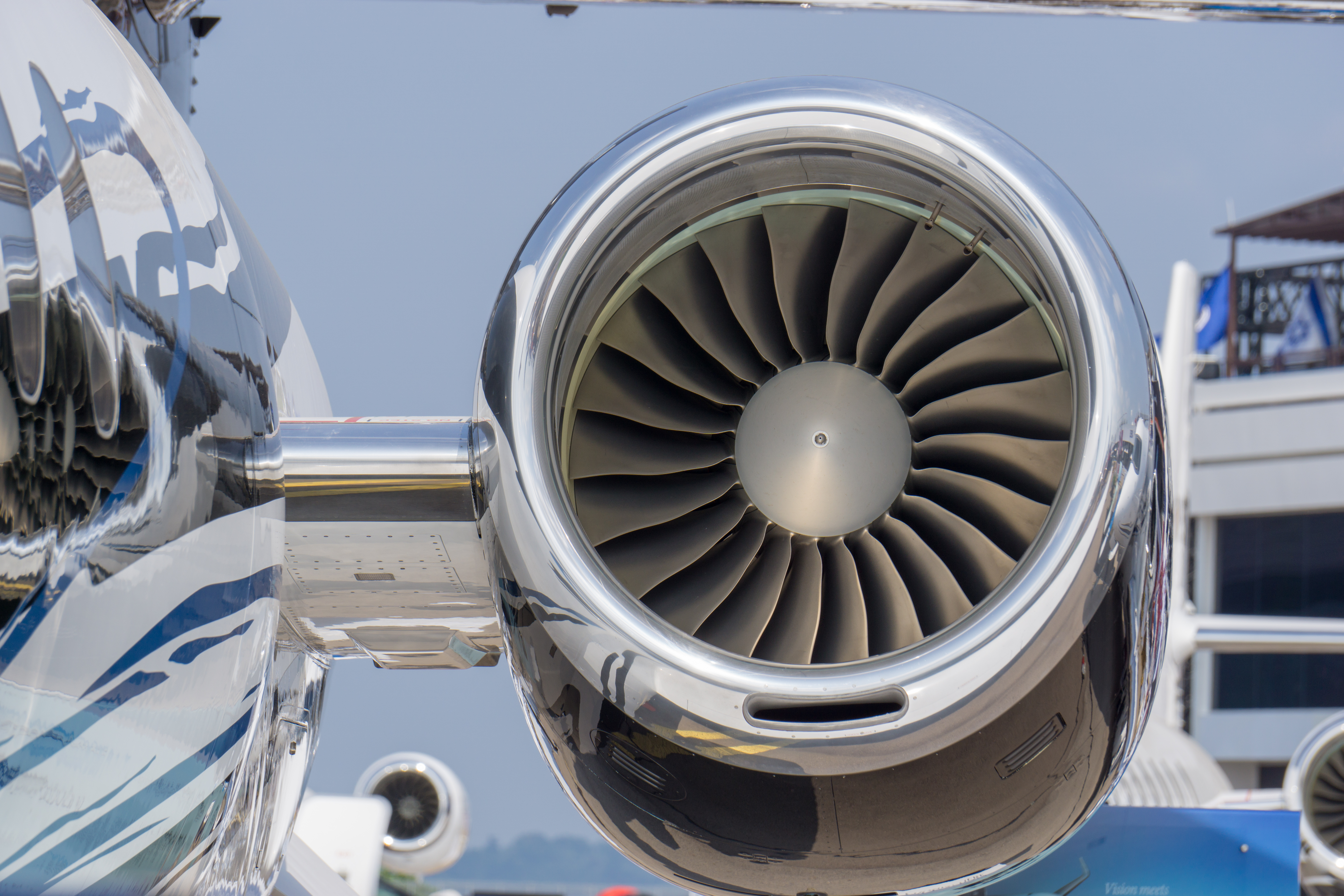
PW306 fan, Cessna Citation Latitude

PW305A
20.81 kN (4,680 lb_{f}) variant used on the Bombardier Learjet 60.
PW305B
23.41 kN (5,260 lb_{f}) variant used on the Hawker 1000.
PW306A
25.36 kN (5,700 lb_{f}) variant used on the IAI Galaxy & Gulfstream G200.
PW306B
Variant used on the Dornier 328JET.
PW306C
25.67 kN (5,770 lb_{f}) variant used on the Cessna Citation Sovereign.
PW306D
26.28 kN (5,910 lb_{f}) variant used on the Cessna Citation Sovereign +.
PW306D1
25.6 kN (5,800 lb_{f}) variant used on the Cessna Citation Latitude.
PW307A
28.49 kN (6,400 lb_{f}) variant used on the Dassault Falcon 7X. Originally 27.1 kN (6,100 lb_{f}) growth version of the PW306, smaller than the PW308, featuring swept-blade fan, increased core airflow, low NOx emissions combustor, increased turbine capacity and a more efficient exhaust mixer; integrated propulsion system including Macchi/Hurel Dubois nacelle and thrust-reverser; certification scheduled for the end of 2004.
PW307B
Variant used on the Bombardier Learjet 85.
PW307D
Variant used on the Dassault Falcon 8X.
PW308A
30.69 kN (6,900 lb_{f}) variant used on the Hawker 4000 & Scaled Composites White Knight Two.
PW308C
31.14 kN (7,000 lb_{f}) variant used on the Dassault Falcon 2000EX/DX/LX.

== Applications ==
- Cessna Citation Latitude
- Cessna Citation Sovereign
- Dassault Falcon 2000EX/DX/LX
- Dassault Falcon 7X
- Fairchild Dornier 328JET
- Fairchild Dornier 428JET
- Gulfstream G200
- Hawker 1000
- Hawker 4000
- Learjet 60
- Learjet 85
- Scaled Composites White Knight Two

== Specifications (PW306B) ==
Data from Jane's all the World's Aircraft 1993–94

==== General characteristics ====
- Type: Turbofan
- Length: 2,062 mm (81.2 in)
- Diameter: 970.3 mm (38.20 in)
- Dry weight: 450 kg (990 lb) installed

==== Components ====
- Compressor: 1-stage fan, 4-stage axial with 1-stage centrifugal high pressure compressor
- Combustors: Annular
- Turbine: 2 stage high pressure, 3 stage low pressure turbines.
- Fuel type: Aviation Kerosene such as JET A, JET A-1, JP-4, JP-5 or CPW-204
- Oil system: Pressure spray integral system with gear pump and scavenge, capacity 2.11 US gal (1.76 imp gal; 8.0 L)

==== Performance ====
- Maximum thrust: 23.24 kN (5,220 lb_{f}) for take-off or flat-rated at 21.13 kN (4,750 lb_{f}) up to 25 °C (77 °F)
- Cruise thrust: 5.03 kN (1,130 lb_{f}) at M0.8 at 12,200 m (40,000 ft)
- Overall pressure ratio: Core pressure ratio: 15:1
- Bypass ratio: 4.5:1
- Specific fuel consumption: 41.5 kg/kN/h (0.407 lb/lbf/h) at take-off
- Cruise s.f.c.: 69.9 kg/kN/h (0.685 lb/lbf/h)
- Thrust-to-weight ratio: 5.26 at take-off power

== See also ==
Comparable engines

- Honeywell ALF 502/Honeywell LF 507
- Honeywell HTF7000
- Rolls-Royce AE 3007

Related lists

- List of aircraft engines
