= Dassault Falcon 900 =

Executive trijet aircraft family by Dassault

Falcon 900
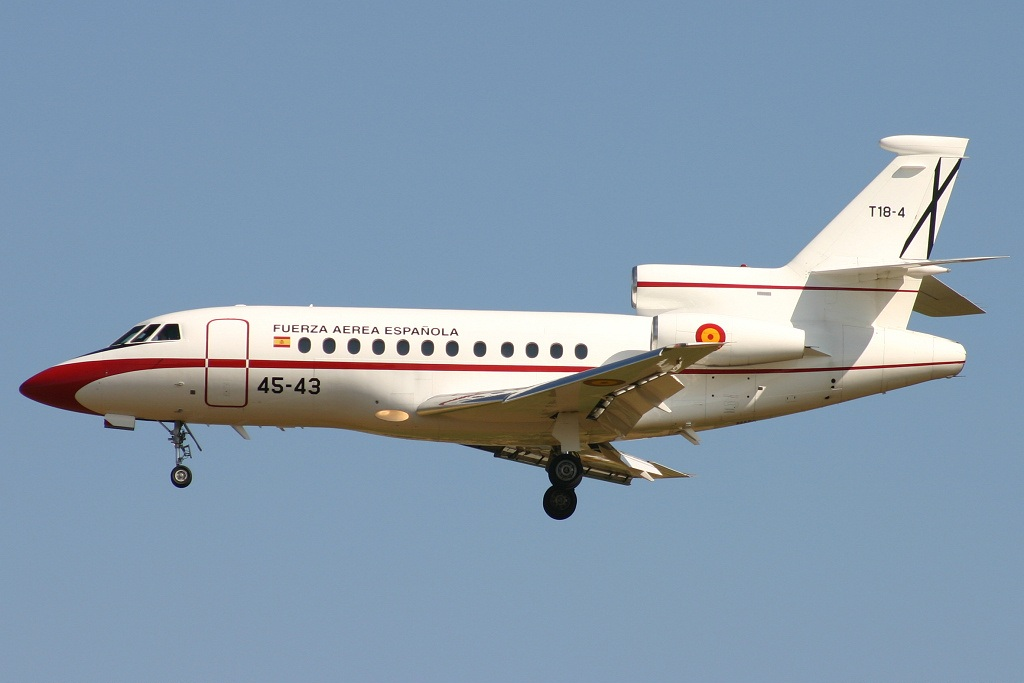
- A Spanish Air Force Dassault Falcon 900B

General information
- Type: Business jet
- National origin: France
- Manufacturer: Dassault Aviation
- Status: Active service, in production
- Primary users: French Air and Space Force Japan Coast Guard; Nigerian Air Force; Royal Malaysian Air Force
- Number built: >500

History
- Manufactured: 1984–present
- First flight: 21 September 1984; 42 years ago
- Developed from: Dassault Falcon 50
- Developed into: Dassault Falcon 2000; Dassault Falcon 7X

The Dassault Falcon 900, commonly abbreviated as the F900, is a French-built corporate trijet aircraft made by Dassault Aviation.

== Development ==
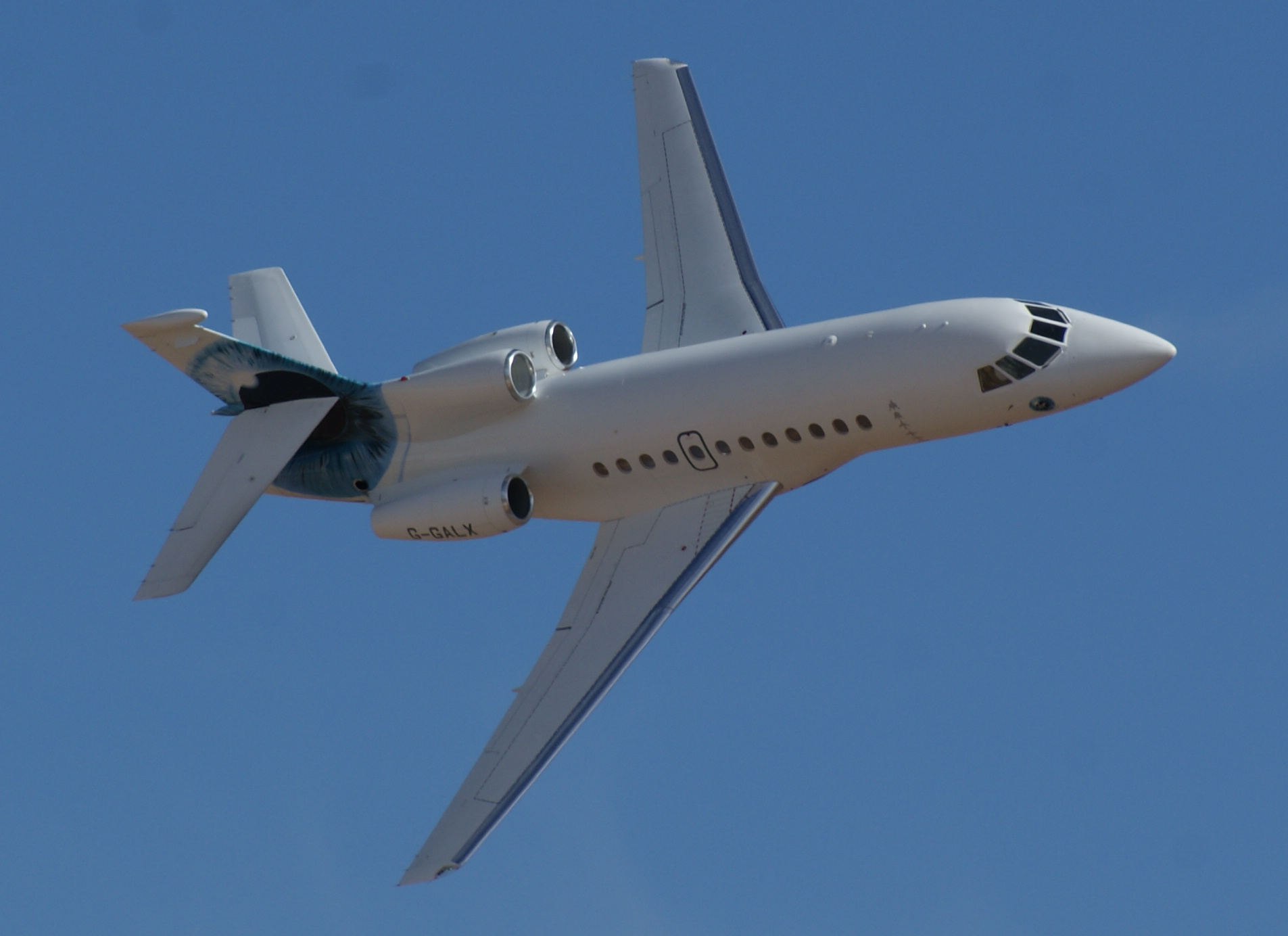
Falcon 900EX (G-GALX) during a flyby

The Falcon 900 is a development of the Falcon 50, itself a development of the earlier Falcon 20. The Falcon 900 airframe design incorporates composite materials.

Other models include the Falcon 900-B, featuring an increased range, and the Falcon 900EX featuring other improvements in engines and range and an all-glass flight deck. The Falcon 900C is a companion to the Falcon 900EX and replaces the Falcon 900B. Later versions are the Falcon 900EX EASy, and the Falcon 900DX. At EBACE 2008, Dassault announced another development of the 900 series: the Falcon 900LX, incorporating high mach blended winglets designed by Aviation Partners Inc.

In 2023, the 900LX equipped price was $44.7 million.

== Operational service ==
In France, the Falcon 900 is used by the Transport Squadron 60 (Transportation, Training and Calibration Squadron 65), which is in charge of transportation for officials in France.

== Variants ==
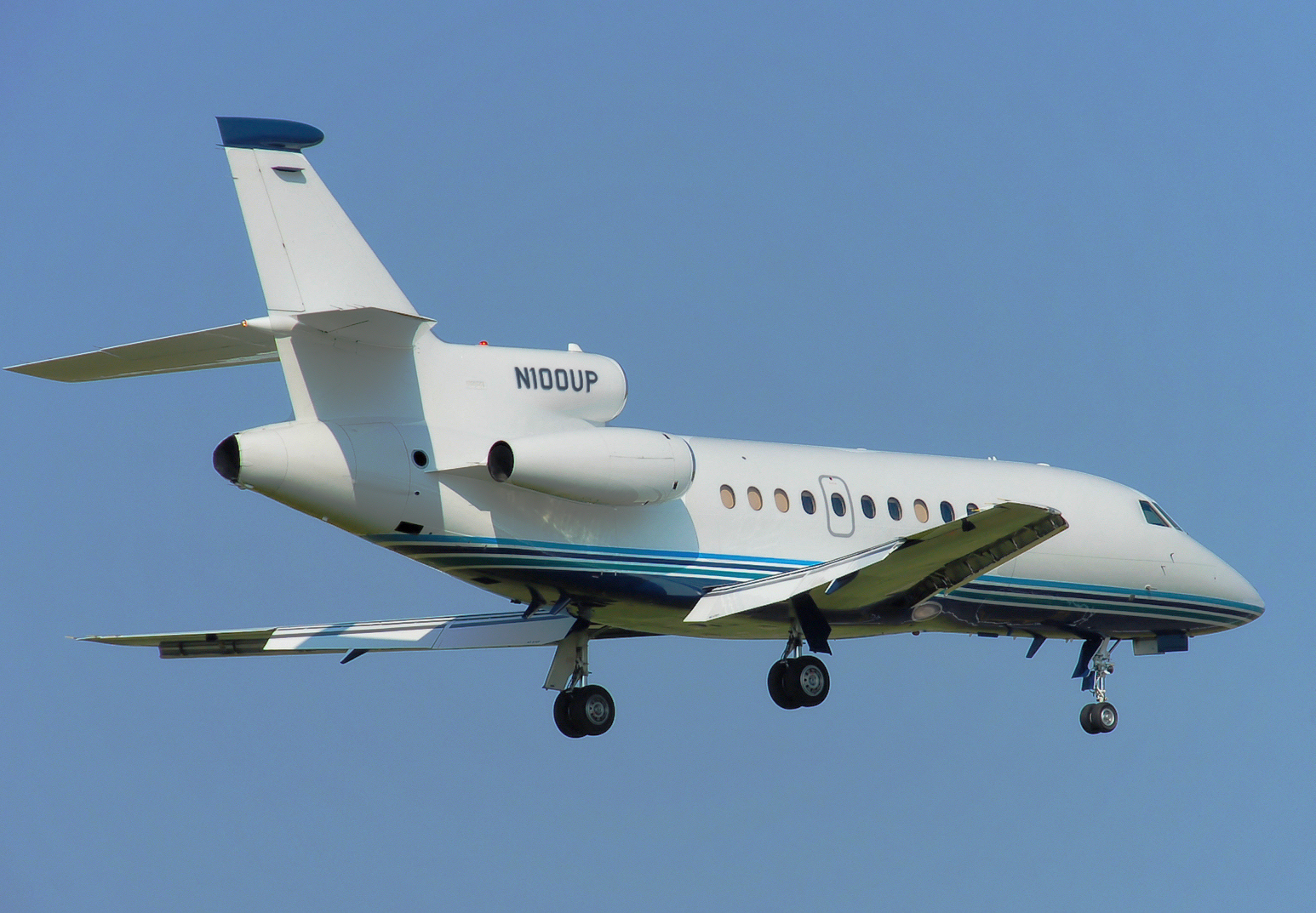
Dassault Falcon 900B.

Falcon 900
Announced in 1984, original production. Powered by three 20 kilonewtons (4,500 pounds-force) Garrett TFE731-5AR-1C turbofan jet engines. It was certified in 1986 by French and U.S. aviation authorities.
Falcon 900 MSA
Maritime patrol version for Japan Coast Guard; this variant is equipped with search radar and a hatch for dropping rescue stores.
Falcon 900B
Revised production version from 1991, powered by 21.13 kilonewtons (4,750 pounds-force) TFE731-5BR-1C engines.
Falcon 900C
Replacement for 900B, introduced in 2000.
Falcon 900EX
Long range version with 22.24 kilonewtons (5,000 pounds-force) engines; this variant features TFE731-60 engines, with a range of 4,500 nautical miles (8,334 kilometres; 5,179 miles), and avionics by Honeywell Primus. It entered service in 1996.
Falcon 900EX EASy
Long range version produced from 2004 to 2009; fitted with Honeywell / Dassault Primus Epic EASy avionics. TFE731-60 engines.
Falcon 900DX
Shorter-range production type with TFE731-60 engines.
Falcon 900LX
Current production variant of EX fitted with blended winglets; range of 4,750 nautical miles (8,797 kilometres; 5,466 miles).
Envoy IV CC1
Royal Air Force (RAF) United Kingdom military service designation for their 900LX.
VC-900A
Italian military designation for the 900EX.
VC-900B
Italian military designation for the 900EX EASy.

== Operators ==
=== Civil operators ===
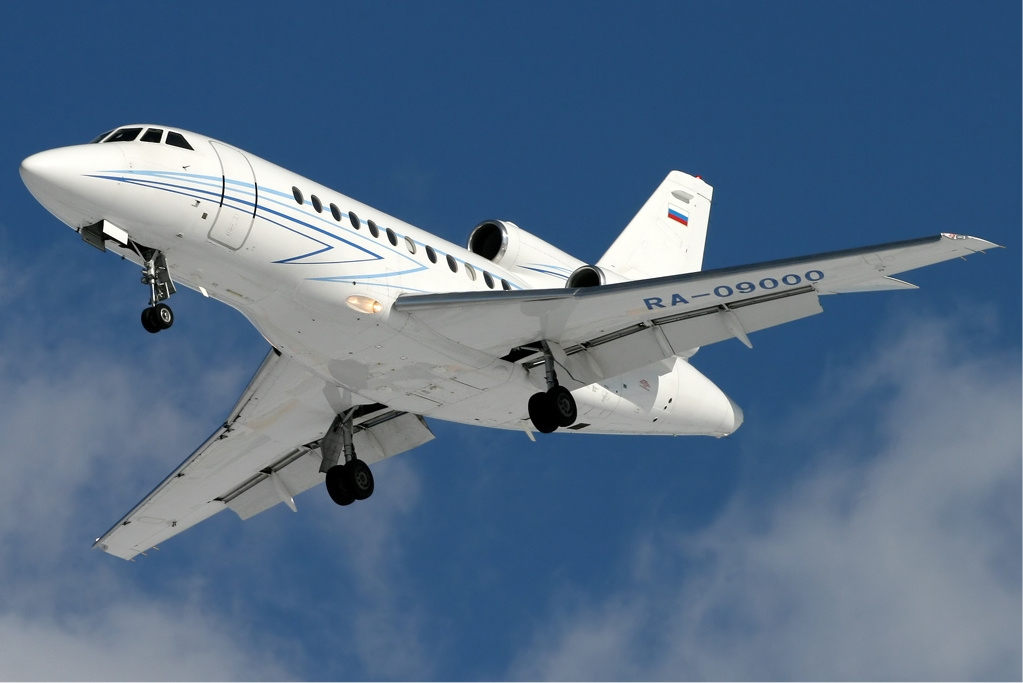
A Falcon 900B of Gazpromavia

A wide range of private owners, businesses, and small airlines operate Falcon 900s.

Libya

- Government owned (registration number 5A-DCN)

Qatar

- Qatar Amiri Flight

Saudi Arabia

- Saudia Private Aviation

=== Military operators ===
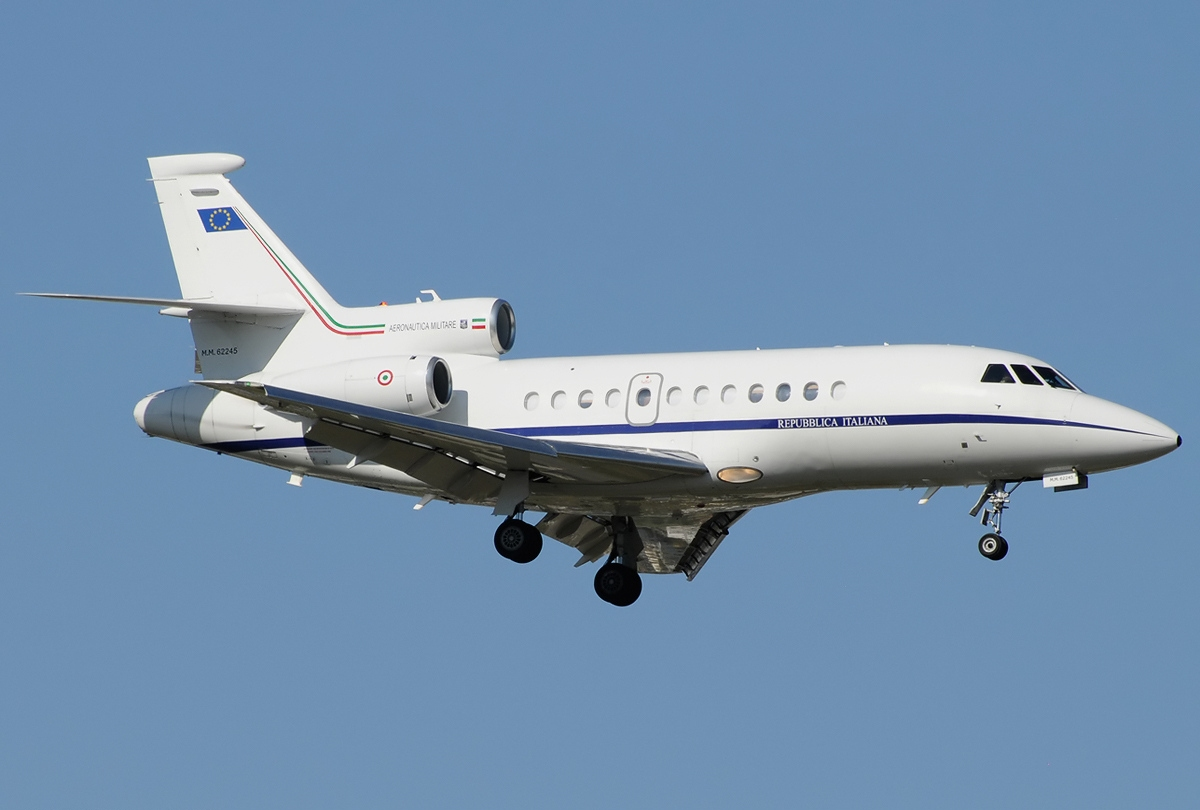
Falcon 900EX of the Italian Air Force

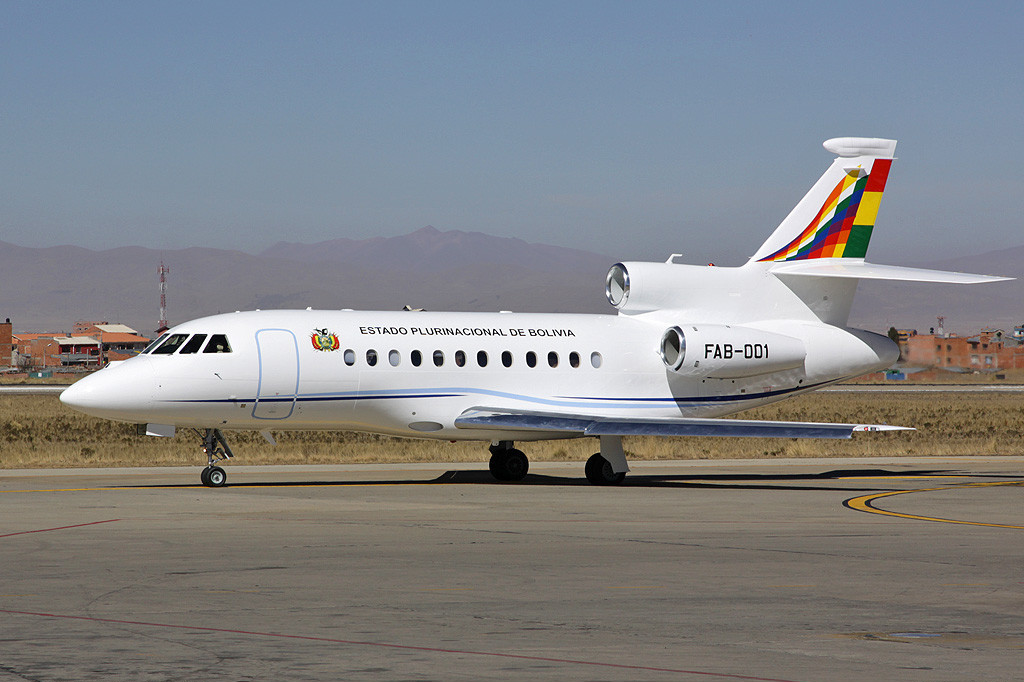
Falcon 900EX of the Bolivian Air Force

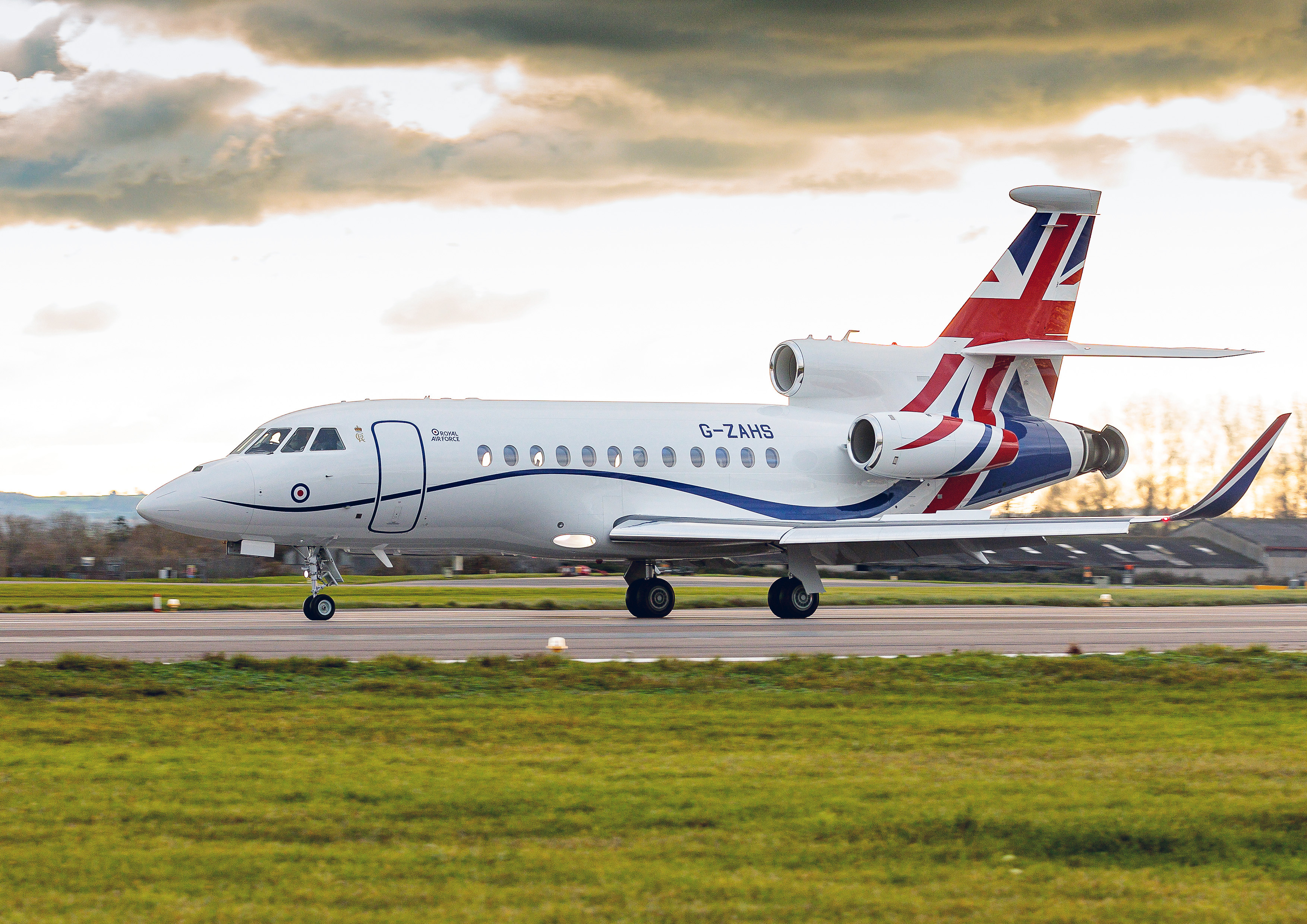
Falcon 900LX (Envoy IV CC1) of the Royal Air Force operated by 32 (The Royal) Squadron in its 'Global Britain' livery

Bolivia

- Bolivian Air Force - 900EX (registration FAB-001) is presidential aircraft

France

- French Air and Space Force

Germany

- Bundesnachrichtendienst (Federal Intelligence Service)

Italy

- Italian Air Force - operates five Falcon 900EX since 2005

Japan

- Japan Coast Guard

Namibia

- Namibian Air Force

Nigeria

- Nigerian Air Force

Portugal

- Portuguese Air Force

Russia

- President of Russia

South Africa

- South African Air Force

Spain

- Spanish Air and Space Force

Switzerland

- Swiss Air Force - 900EX EASy II

Syria

- Syrian Air Force

United Arab Emirates

- United Arab Emirates Air Force

United Kingdom

- Royal Air Force
  - 32 (The Royal) Squadron - two civilian-registered 900LXs operated under civil contract from March 2022, full military from 2026.

Venezuela

- Venezuelan Air Force

=== Former operators ===
Algeria

- Algerian Air Force

Australia

- Royal Australian Air Force - five in service from 1989-2003
  - No. 34 Squadron RAAF

Belgium

- Belgian Air Component - one was in use until 2019 for VIP transport

Gabon

- Gabon Air Force

Greece

- Government of Greece

Malawi

- Government of Malawi - a Falcon 900EX purchased in 2009 as a presidential jet, sold in 2013
- Military of Malawi

Malaysia

- Royal Malaysian Air Force

Monaco

- Government of Monaco - replaced by a Falcon 7X

== Accidents and incidents ==
- On 14 September 1999, Olympic Airways Flight 3838, a Falcon 900B (registered SX-ECH) operating for the Hellenic Air Force by Olympic Airways, was descending to land at Bucharest, Romania, when the autopilot disengaged and several pilot-induced oscillations occurred. The impact of unfastened passengers with the cabin and aircraft furniture resulted in fatal injuries to seven passengers, serious injuries to two, and minor to another two. Among the victims was Giannos Kranidiotis, then deputy foreign minister for Greece.
- On 13 February 2021, a Falcon 900EX corporate jet (N823RC) experienced a landing gear collapse after an aborted takeoff at Montgomery-Gibbs Executive Airport, California. Although the aircraft sustained significant damage, all five occupants on board escaped without injuries. The flight crew explained that during the takeoff attempt, the captain applied back pressure to the control yoke, but the nose failed to rotate to a takeoff position. After multiple attempts, the captain decided to reject the takeoff by reducing thrust and applying maximum brakes. As a result, the aircraft overshot the runway and the landing gear collapsed upon reaching a gravel pad. The NTSB investigation revealed that the captain did not possess a valid pilot certificate due to an emergency revocation by the FAA two years earlier. This revocation occurred because the captain had falsified logbook entries and records for pilot proficiency checks, competency checks, and training events while serving as a check pilot for a Part 135 operator.

== Specifications (Falcon 900B) ==
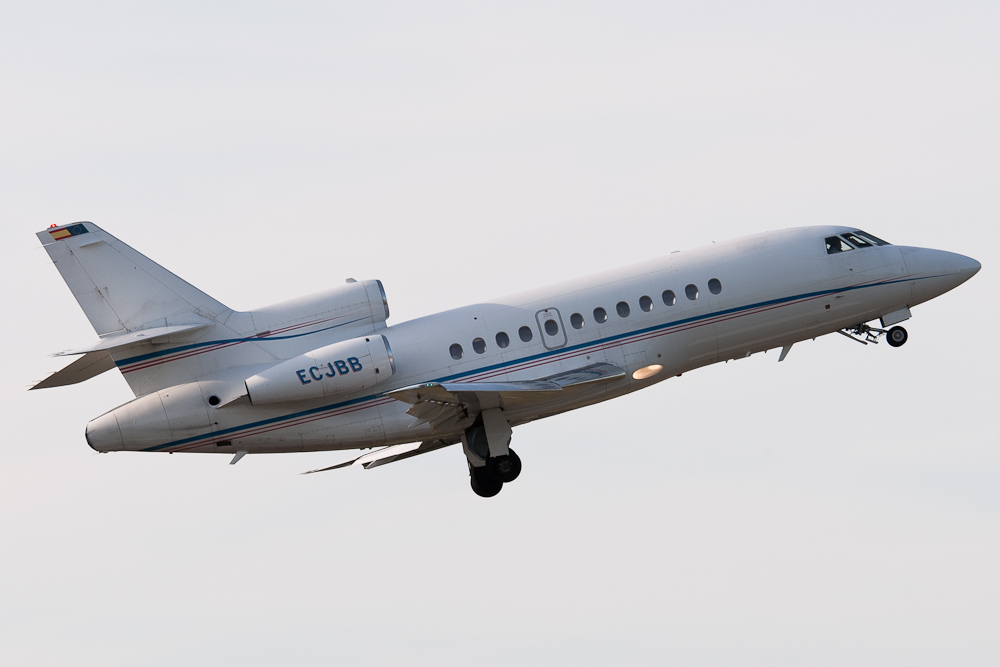
A Falcon 900 shortly after take-off

Data from

General characteristics

- Crew: 2
- Capacity: 19 passengers
- Length: 20.21 m (66 ft 4 in)
- Wingspan: 19.33 m (63 ft 5 in)
- Wing area: 49.0 m^{2} (527 sq ft)
- Aspect ratio: 7.63:1
- Empty weight: 10,255 kg (22,608 lb)
- Max takeoff weight: 20,640 kg (45,503 lb)
- Fuel capacity: 8,690 kg (19,160 lb)
- Powerplant: 3 × Honeywell TFE731-5BR-1C turbofans, 21.13 kN (4,750 lbf) thrust each

Performance

- Maximum speed: Mach 0.84–0.87
- Cruise speed: 950 km/h (590 mph, 510 kn) ; Mach 0.85 (at 11,000 m (36,000 ft))
- Stall speed: 158 km/h (98 mph, 85 kn) (wheels and flaps down)
- Range: 7,400 km (4,600 mi, 4,000 nmi) with 8 passengers
- Service ceiling: 15,500 m (50,900 ft)

== See also ==
Related development

- Dassault Falcon 50
- Dassault Falcon 2000
- Dassault Falcon 7X

Aircraft of comparable role, configuration, and era

- Bombardier Challenger 605
- Bombardier Global 5500
- Embraer Legacy 600 / 650
- Gulfstream G450

Related lists

- List of civil aircraft
