= List of active equipment of the German Air Force =

This list intends to give an accurate detail list of the equipment currently fielded by the German Air Force.

== Aircraft of the German Air Force ==
=== Current fleet of the German Air Force ===
==== List of aeroplanes of the Luftwaffe ====
Aircraft	Variant	Image	Origin	Type	In service	Notes
Combat aircraft
Eurofighter Typhoon	T1		Germany; Italy; Spain; United Kingdom	Interceptor	20	Status: 127 in service (at the end oof 2026).: 33 Eurofighter T1 ordered, 13 retired; 79 Eurofighter T2 ordered, 2 lost, 1 retired; 31 Eurofighter T3A ordered
Eurofighter Typhoon	T2		Germany; Italy; Spain; United Kingdom	Swingrole jet fighter	76	Status: 127 in service (at the end oof 2026).: 33 Eurofighter T1 ordered, 13 retired; 79 Eurofighter T2 ordered, 2 lost, 1 retired; 31 Eurofighter T3A ordered
Eurofighter Typhoon	T3A		Germany; Italy; Spain; United Kingdom	Swingrole jet fighter	31	Status: 127 in service (at the end oof 2026).: 33 Eurofighter T1 ordered, 13 retired; 79 Eurofighter T2 ordered, 2 lost, 1 retired; 31 Eurofighter T3A ordered
Panavia Tornado	IDS		Germany; Italy; United Kingdom	Multirole jet fighter, nuclear deterrent bomber	60	
Lockheed Martin F-35 Lightning II	F-35A		United States	Swingrole fighter / nuclear deterrent fighter-bomber	1 (+34 on order)	Purchased to continue German contribution to the Nuclear sharing B61-12.
Special mission aircraft
Panavia Tornado	ECR		Germany; Italy; United Kingdom	SEAD, ECR	21	
Military Transport / Aerial refueling
Airbus A400M	A400M		Spain; Belgium; France; Germany; Turkey; United Kingdom	Tactical airlifter, strategic airlifter, aerial refueling	53	The last of 53 A400M ordered was delivered by April 2026. Equipment of the A400M of the Bundeswehr: at least 4 refuelling kits; 23 DIRCM (Directed Infrared Counter Measures) systems ordered in June 2025
Lockheed Martin C-130 Super Hercules	C-130J-30		United States	Tactical airlifter	3	
Lockheed Martin C-130 Super Hercules	KC-130J		United States	Tactical airlifter, aerial refueling	3	
Trainer aircraft
Panavia Tornado	IDS trainer		Germany; Italy; United Kingdom	Conversion trainer	2	

==== List of helicopters of the Luftwaffe ====
Aircraft	Variant	Image	Origin	Type	In service	Notes
Airbus Helicopters H145	EC645 T2 LUH SOF		Germany	Light utility	16	
Airbus Helicopters H145	H145M LKH; Leichter Kampfhubschrauber		Germany	Light attack helicopter	4	82 ordered in total for the Bundeswehr, this includes 10 for the Air Force, 72 for the Army. German Air Force orders: 5 in December 2023; 5 in December 2025; Deliveries: 2 in June 2026
Sikorsky CH-53	CH-53G, CH-53GA, CH-53GS		United States; Germany (under licence)	Heavy transport helicopter	82	First delivered in 1972, 112 aircraft received in total. To be replaced with 60 CH-47F Block II (SR AAR).

==== List of military aircraft of the Executive Transport Wing ====
Aircraft	Variant	Image	Origin	Type	In service	Notes
Transport - "Grey Fleet"
Airbus A321neo	A321LR; Long range		France; Germany	Transport, MEDEVAC	2	
Special mission aircraft - "White Fleet"
Airbus A319	A319OH; Offener Himmel		France; Germany	Reconnaissance	1	In service since June 2019. It is performing reconnaissance missions under the Open Skies Treaty.
Transport - "White Fleet"
Airbus A350	ACJ350		France; Germany	VIP transport, troops transport	3	Entered service between January 2021 and March 2023.
Airbus A321	A321-200		France; Germany	VIP transport, troops transport	1	
Airbus A319	A319CJ		France; Germany	VIP transport	2	In service since 2010.
Bombardier Global 5000	Global 5000		Canada	VIP transport	3	
Bombardier Global 6000	Global 6000		Canada	VIP transport	3	
Helicopter transport
Eurocopter AS532	AS532 U2		France	VIP transport	3	Operated by the Flugbereitschaft des Bundesministeriums der Verteidigung.

==== List of aircraft of the WTD61 ====
Aircraft	Variant	Image	Origin	Type	In service	Notes
Pilatus PC-12	PC-12 NGX	(illustration)	Switzerland	Test pilot training (and transport aircraft)	1	

=== Externally owned aircraft ===
==== International collaborations ====
Aircraft	Variant	Image	Origin	Operator	Type	In service	Notes
Aerial refueling
Airbus A330 MRTT; Multi-Role Tanker Transport	A330-200 MRTT		France; Germany; Spain; United Kingdom	MMF; Multinational MRTT Fleet (Belgium, Czechia, Denmark, Finland, Germany, Luxembourg, Netherlands, Norway, Sweden)	Tanker, transporter, medical evacuation aircraft	10 (+2 on order)	Based at the Eindhoven Air Base in the Netherlands. History of the programme (nations joining and aircraft orders): July 2016, multinational fleet created by the Netherlands and Luxembourg, 2 aircraft ordered.; September 2017, Germany and Norway join the fleet, 5 aircraft ordered.; February 2018, Belgium joins the fleet, 1 aircraft ordered.; September 2020, 1 aircraft ordered, Luxembourg expands its participation.; March 2023, 1 aircraft ordered, Belgium expands its participation.; June 2025, Denmark and Sweden join the fleet, 2 aircraft ordered.; July 2026, Finland joins the fleet.; The first aircraft entered service in June 2020, the ninth in February 2025).
A330 MRTT MEDEVAC kit	A330 MRTT		European Union	MMF; Multinational MRTT Fleet (Belgium, Czechia, Denmark, Finland, Germany, Luxembourg, Netherlands, Norway, Sweden)	MEDEVAC kit Medical evacuation kit	1	One of the MRTT aircraft of the Multinational MRTT Fleet comes with the MEDEVAC kits. Kit with: 6 ICU, 16 stretchers and 21 chairs for medical support.
Air surveillance
Boeing E-3 Sentry	E-3A		United States	NAEW&CF programme (Belgium, Canada, Czechia, Denmark, Germany, Greece, Hungary, Italy, Luxembourg, Netherlands, Norway, Poland, Portugal, Romania, Turkey, Spain, United States)	AEW&C	14	Based at NATO Air Base Geilenkirchen, Germany. 18 E-3 used initially, and was to be replaced by the E-7 Wedgetail, of which 6 were ordered in January 2024, however that order was cancelled in 2026 and the SAAB/Bombardier Globaleye AWACS will now be the replacement with 10 in the initial order with an option of 4 more.
Drones
Northrop Grumman RQ-4 Global Hawk	RQ-4D Phoenix (Block 40)		United States	AGS (Bulgaria, Czechia, Denmark, Estonia, Germany, Italy, Latvia, Lithuania, Luxembourg, Norway, Poland, Romania, Slovakia, Slovenia, United Kingdom, United States)	UCAV; HALE; ISR	5	

==== Aircraft provided by contractors ====
Aircraft	Variant	Image	Origin	Contractor	Type	In service	Notes
Aircraft
PZL M28 Skytruck	(with underbelly luggage pod)		Poland; Ukraine	PD Sicherheit	Paratrooper training	3	
Helicopters
Airbus H135	EC 135P2+	–	Germany	DL Helicopter Technik	Training helicopter	–	Contract extended in July 2021. 1 lost in July 2025. Approval for additional rentals in December 2025.
Airbus H145	H145 D2		Germany	NHV	Training helicopter	1	Used to train KSK pilots.
Airbus H145	H145 D3		Germany	NHV	Training helicopter	2	Used to train KSK pilots.

==== Aircraft on lease ====
Aircraft	Variant	Image	Origin	Type	In service	Notes
UAVs
IAI Heron	Heron TP (Eitan)		Israel	UCAV; MALE; ISR	5	5 Heron 1 were leased until July 2023 when it was retired after 13 years in service. Leasing contract for 5 drones signed in 2018. 3 planned to be purchased as of June 2025.

== Aircraft equipment ==
=== Current aircraft equipment ===
Model	Variant	Image	Origin	Type	Used with	In service	Notes
Reconnaissance and targeting equipment
Litening	Rafael / Zeiss Litening 3		Israel; Germany (licence production)	Targeting pod	Panavia Tornado (IDS); Eurofighter (T1, T2, T3)	–	It succeeded to the Litening 2 that was used with the Panavia Tornado (IDS).
Litening	Litening V		Israel	Targeting pod	Eurofighter (T2, T3, T4, T5)	1 (+89 on order)	Approved for purchase in June 2025, budget of €350 million. Contract in August 2025. Used for laser guidance, GPS guidance, or image guidance with datalink, with the following capabilities: EO; SWIR; MWIR; SAR
RecceLite	–		Israel; Germany	Reconnaissance pod	Panavia Tornado (IDS, ECR); Eurofighter (T1, T2, T3, T4, T5)	–	Used on the Tornado since 2009. Zeiss supplies the sensors. It enables IR and optical high resolution reconnaissance, with digitised data.
Radar
Euroradar CAPTOR	CAPTOR-M		United Kingdom; Italy; Germany; Spain	Mechanically scanned array radar	Eurofighter (T1, T2, T3)	–	
Electronic warfare
Cerberus IV / TSPJ; Tornado Self-Protect Jammer	–		Israel; Germany	ECM pod	Panavia Tornado (ECR)	–	
ELS	–		United States	Radar locator sensor	Panavia Tornado (ECR)	–	System supplied by Texas Instrument.
Praetorian DASS	–	–	United Kingdom; Italy; Spain; Germany	Self-protection EW	Eurofighter (T1, T2, T3)	–	The system is made of: RWR; ESM; LWR; ECM; MAW; TRD; Countermeasure Dispenser Systems; The system is being modernised to the Praetorian eVo standard.
Hardware
Cobham 908E WDE'	–		United Kingdom	Under-wing refuelling pod (for aircraft and helicopters)	Airbus A400M	–	
Cobham 808E HDU	–	–	United Kingdom	Under-fuselage refuelling pod (for aircraft)	Airbus A400M	–	

== Aircraft weapons ==
Model	Variant	Image	Origin	Type	Used with	In service	Notes
Cannons
Mauser BK-27	–		Germany	Revolver cannon 27×145 mm	Panavia Tornado (IDS, ECR); Eurofighter (T1, T2, T3, T4, T5, EK)	–	
POD NC 621			France	Cannon pod 20×102 mm	Airbus H145M LKH	–	
BVR air-to-air missiles
AIM-120 AMRAAM	AIM-120B		United States	BVR, radar homing, air-to-air missile	Eurofighter (T1, T2, T3)	– (320 initially)	320 AIM-120B purchased by the German Air Force for the F-4F Phantom II in 1995. This missile is qualified with the Eurofighter T1.
Meteor	–		United Kingdom; Germany; France; Italy; Spain; Sweden	BVR, radar homing, air-to-air missile	Eurofighter (T2, T3, T4, T5, EK); F-35A Lightning II	> 520	Orders: Batch 1: 150 (order 2013, delivery 2016-18); Batch 2: 100 (2019); Batch 3: ~270 (November 2024 - €521 million budget approved); Batch 4: unknown quantity (January 2026)First missile shot by the German Eurofighter in December 2024.
Short range air-to-air missiles
AIM-9 Sidewinder	AIM-9L/I		United States; Germany	Infrared homing, short range air-to-air missile	Panavia Tornado (IDS, ECR); Eurofighter (T1, T2, T3)	–	Made under licence by Diehl in Germany. The missile is not produced anymore, but remains in the stockpile. It was initially used by the F-4 Phantom II, later with the Tornado..
IRIS-T	–		Germany; Italy; Greece; Norway; Spain; Sweden	Infrared homing, short range air-to-air missile	Panavia Tornado (IDS, ECR) / Eurofighter (T1, T2, T3, T4, T5, EK)	> 1,370	Quantity remaining unknown as some were supplied for the IRIS-T SLS for Ukraine. Orders: 1,250; Framework agreement (2023): 1,280. Firm orders in the framework: 120 (2023); unknown quantity in 2026; Approval to maintain and modernise the IRIS-T missiles to the Block II in December 2024, signed in January 2025.
Strategic weapons
B61 nuclear bomb	B61 Mod 3	(illustration)	United States	Thermonuclear gravity bomb (variable yield of 0.3, 1.5, 60, or 170 kt)	Panavia Tornado (IDS)	–	Weapons under American control, operated by the Luftwaffe. To be retired when the F-35A replaces the Tornado IDS, and the B61 Mod 12 will be used.
B61 nuclear bomb	B61 Mod 4	(illustration)	United States	Thermonuclear gravity bomb (variable yield of 0.3, 1.5, 10, or 45 kt)	Panavia Tornado (IDS)	–	Weapons under American control, operated by the Luftwaffe. To be retired when the F-35A replaces the Tornado IDS, and the B61 Mod 12 will be used.
Air-to-surface missiles
Taurus	KEPD 350E		Germany; Sweden	Land attack cruise missile	Panavia Tornado (IDS); Eurofighter (T2, T3, T4, T5)	– (600 initially)	600 ordered, delivered between 2005 and 2010. Modernisation contract signed in 2025.
AGM-88	AGM-88B HARM Block IIIB		United States	Anti-radiation missile	Panavia Tornado (ECR); Eurofighter (T2, T3)	–	AGM-88B HARM Block IIIB in use with the Tornado.
AGM-88	AGM-88E2 AARGM		United States	Anti-radiation missile	Panavia Tornado (ECR); Eurofighter (T4, T5, EK); F-35A Lightning II	–	Ordered in 2021, testing starting in 2025 with the Tornado ECR.
AIM-9 Sidewinder	LaGS	–	United States; Germany	Land attack missile	Panavia Tornado (IDS)	– (300 initially)	Made under licence by Diehl in Germany. Later on proposed for modification by Diehl for the land attack mission, as the need for the air-to-air missile declined, and the need for air-to-ground missiles increased.
Unguided bombs
Mark 82	Mark 82-EP		Italy / United States	Gravity bomb 500 lb (230 kg)	Panavia Tornado (IDS, ECR); Eurofighter (T2, T3, T4, T5, EK); F-35A Lightning II	–	The bombs can be used unguided or with a guidance kit. When used with a guidance kit, the one used is the GBU-54 JDAM, with the FBM21- GER fuse. Note: made by Rheinmetall Italy.
Mark 83	–	–	Italy / United States	Gravity bomb 1,000 lb (450 kg)	Panavia Tornado (IDS, ECR); Eurofighter (T2, T3, T4, T5, EK); F-35A Lightning II	–	The bombs can be used unguided or with a guidance kit. . When used with a guidance kit, the one used is the GBU-48 Enhanced Paveway II, with the FBM21- GER fuse.
Mark 84	–		Italy / United States	Gravity bomb 2,000 lb (910 kg)	Panavia Tornado (IDS, ECR); F-35A Lightning II	–	The bombs can be used unguided or with a guidance kit. When used with a guidance kit, the one used is the GBU-24 Paveway III.
BLU-109	–		Italy / United States	Bunker buster bomb 2,000 lb (910 kg)	Panavia Tornado (IDS, ECR); F-35A Lightning II	–	The bombs can be used unguided or with a guidance kit. When used with a guidance kit, the one used is the GBU-24 Paveway III.
Bomb guidance kits
GBU-54 JDAM	–		United States	Precision guidance kit (dual mode GPS / laser)	Panavia Tornado (IDS, ECR); Eurofighter (T2, T3, T4, T5, EK); F-35A Lightning II	–	Warhead: Mark 82, 500 lb (230 kg) bomb.
GBU-48 Enhanced Paveway II	–		United States	Precision guidance kit (dual mode GPS / laser)	Panavia Tornado (IDS); Eurofighter (T2, T3, T4, T5, EK); F-35A Lightning II	–	Warhead: Mark 83, 1,000 lb (450 kg) bomb.
GBU-24 Paveway III	–		United States	Laser guidance kit	Panavia Tornado (IDS, ECR); F-35A Lightning II	–	Warheads: Mark 84 and BLU-109 2,000 lb (910 kg) bombs.
Rockets
FZ Rocket system	FZ71, FZ181, FZ122, FZ149		Belgium; Germany	Rocket; 70 mm	Airbus H145M LKH	–	Rocket manufactured by Rheinmetall, in collaboration with Thales Belgium. Contract in 2022 for 7'620 rockets for €19.92 million. Rocket pods with 7 rockets (FZ233/FZ220), 12 tubes (FZ231/FZ219) or 19 rockets (FZ225/FZ207)

Current equipment to equip future aircraft as well
Aircraft to be upgraded in order to be equipped with this missile

== Air defence systems ==
=== Surface-to-air missiles and missiles systems ===
Model	Image	Origin	Type	Range	Altitude	Number	Notes
Arrow 3
Arrow 3		Israel; United States	Anti-ballistic missile air defence system	2,400 km (1,500 mi)	> 100 km (62 mi)	2 (+ 1 on order)	System designed and made jointly by IAI and Boeing. Orders: 2023 - 3 Arrow 3 systems; funds approved in June 2023; American export approval in August 2023; agreement between Germany and Israel for 3 systems in September 2023; contract signed in November 2023 (€3.5 billion); 2025 / 2026; funds approved in December 2025 for additional missiles and launchers (USD $3.1 billion more), contract signed in January 2026; Deliveries: First entered in service the 3 December 2025, it was activated at the Holzdorf Air Base (Saxony Anhalt).; Second delivered by July 2026, in the Kaufbeuren Air Base (Bavaria).
Arrow 3 C2	–	Israel; United States	Command and control	–	–	2 (+ 1 on order)	
EL/M-2080S Super Green Pine		Israel	3D, L-band (IEEE), AESA, warning and fire control radar	900 km (560 mi)	–	2 (+ 1 on order)	
Arrow 3 - communication system	–	Israel	Data-link missile-radar	–	–	–	
Arrow 3 launcher		Israel	Transporter erector launcher semi-trailer	–	–	–	Launcher with 4 missiles, unknown number of launchers per fire unit.
Arrow 3 missile		Israel; United States	Anti-ballistic missile	>2,400 km (1,500 mi)	> 100 km (62 mi)	–	It can shoot a ballistic missile with a range of 2,400 km (1,500 mi), with exo-atmospheric capabilities.
MiM-104 Patriot
MIM-104 Patriot; Mobile and Protected Signals Intelligence		Germany; United States	Medium range anti-air missile fire unit	–	–	9 (+10 on order)	During the Cold War, Germany had 36 Patriot systems in service. As of May 2025, the German Air Force operates 9 Patriot systems. The systems in service are upgraded to PAC-3 standard, and it is equipped with PAC-2 and PAC-3 CRI missiles in service. Germany has also PAC-3 MSE and PAC-2 GEM-T missiles on order. The launchers will be converted to be capable to operate the PAC-3 MSE missiles. Budget for the conversion of the launcher approved in December 2025 and for new trucks (guided missile transporter and trailer, swap bodies for power supply systems and semi-trailer tractors).
IRIS-T SLM
IRIS-T SLM; Part of the ESSI		Germany	Short-to-medium range missile fire unit	–	–	1 (+5 on order)	Six fire units were purchased in July 2023 for €950 million and the delivery will start from 2024, 8 in total are expected eventually. First delivery in August 2024.
Airbus IBMS-FS; Integrated Battle Management Software Fire Control System	–	Germany	Command and control	–	–	1 (+5 on order)	It's the TOC (Tactical Operations Centre) of the fire unit.
Hensoldt TRML-4D		Germany	GaN, AESA, 4D, fire acquisition radar	250 km (160 mi) (instrumented range); 60 km (37 mi) (missile track range)	–	1 (+5 on order)	Sensor of the IRIS-T SLM fire unit.
IRIS-T SLM launcher		Germany	Transporter erector launcher	–	–	3 (+15 on order)	3 launchers per fire unit, but up to 8 possible.
IRIS-T SLM missile		Germany; Italy; Sweden; Greece; Norway; Spain	Infrared homing, medium range air-to-air missile	40 km (25 mi)	20 km (12 mi)	–	It is based on the IRIS-T air-to-air missile equipped with an enlarged rocket motor, data link, and jettisonable drag-reducing nose cone.
Ozelot
Ozelot; LeFlaSys (leichtes Flugabwehrsystem)		Germany; United States	Light SHORAD batteries	4.8 km (3.0 mi)	3.5 km (2.2 mi)	5	System based on Wiesel 2. Operated by the 3rd Squadron of 61 Surface-to-Air Missile Group.
Ozelot BF/UF; FlaFührung		Germany	Command and control	–	–	10	
Ozelot AFF		Germany; Sweden	Mobile air surveillance radar	20 km (12 mi)	–	7	Equipment: HARD-improved radar (X-band (IEEE), 3D, known in Sweden as PS-91); IFF MSR 200 XE
Ozelot - ASRAD; FlaRaWaTrg		Germany	Multi-launch system	–	–	50 (+4 in storage)	The weapon carrier is based on the Wiesel 2. Equipment: Missile launcher with 4 Stinger missiles ready to fire, 4 in storage; EO / IR sensor; Radio system
FIM-92 Stinger		United States	Infrared homing, -short range surface-to-air missile	5.5 km (3.4 mi)	3.5 km (2.2 mi)	–	

=== Air surveillance systems ===
Model	Image	Origin	Type	Range	Quantity	Notes
Fixed early warning radars
TRL-4D LR		Germany; Israel	Ballistic missiles early-warning, 3D, S-band (IEEE), AESA radar	400 km (250 mi) (air targets); 2,000 km (1,200 mi) (targets in orbit)	4	Supplied by IAI ELTA and Hensoldt as part of the HADR NF programme. First in service in May 2026.
Ground Master 406F		France; United States	Early warning, 3D, S-band (IEEE), AESA radar	450 km (280 mi)	6	Modified variant of the GM403 for the German forces, for a fixed radar system. Operated by the "Operational Command Service" of the Luftwaffe (EinsFüDstLw). Manufactured by Thales Raytheon Systems.
RRP 117; Remote Radar Post		United States; Germany	Early warning, 3D, D-band (IEEE), solid-state radar	9 to 463 km (5.6 to 287.7 mi)	8	Under radome, in service since 1998. Modifications made by Siemens. To be modernised (December 2025 approval).
Mobile early warning radars
Selex RAT-31DL; VERALÜ		Italy	Mobile early warning, 3D, L-band (IEEE), AESA radar	400 km (250 mi) (range); 30 km (19 mi) (altitude)	3	2 in service since 2011, 1 additional since 2023. The components are the radar and two 20-foot ISO containers.
Airport surveillance radar
Hensoldt’s ASR-S	(Illustration)	Germany	Airport surveillance radar, S-band (IEEE)	100 km (62 mi)	20	Radar used for: approach control at the airfields; airspace surveillance in order to coordinate and integrate the military movements within the civilian traffic

== Navigation equipment ==
=== Current navigation equipment ===
Model	Image	Origin	Type	Quantity	Notes
TACAN		Germany	Tactical air navigation	–	

== Space equipment ==
=== Military satellites ===
Model	Image	Origin	Type	In service	Notes
Communications
SATCOMBw-1	(illustration)	Germany	Geostationary communication satellites	1	Operated at an altitude of 36,000 km. The communication systems work in the Ku-Band and C-Band.
SATCOMBw-2	(illustration)	Germany	Geostationary communication satellites	1	Operated at an altitude of 36,000 km. The communication systems work in the Ku-Band and C-Band.
Surveillance / reconnaissance
SAR-Lupe		Germany	SAR reconnaissance satellite	5	They are at an orbit of 500 km. An X-band radar is used by the satellite.
SARah	–	Germany	SAR reconnaissance satellite	3	Successor of the SAR-Lupe that operates at an orbit of 750 km. The first one is in service. 2 additional that were launched have had problems entering service. The antennas deployed after manoeuvres. Testing are taking place. If they are not operational, they will be replaced.
CSO; Composante Spatiale Optique		France	High resolution optical reconnaissance satellite	3	Operated by the French Space Force, images supplied to the German Armed Forces through the MUSIS programme.
R&D satellite
H2Sat; Heinrich Hertz	–	Germany	Research geostationary communication satellite	1	To be used for scientific and technological verifications. Based on the SmallGEO (LUXOR) satellite. Launched by the last Ariane 5.

=== Commercial / civilian satellites ===
Contractor	Model	Image	Origin	Type	In service	Notes
Communications
Intelsat (through the German company MilSat Services)	–	(illustration)	United States	Communication satellite constellation	–	T-AmtBw signed a contract in 2006 with MilSat Services GmbH for commercial transmission capabilities.
Surveillance / reconnaissance
ICEYE SAR "SPOCK 1"	–	–	Finland; Germany	SAR reconnaissance satellite Synthetic-aperture radar	–	ICEYE / Rheinmetall collaboration, ground equipment, AI-imagery analysis.
Planet Labs	–	–	United States; Germany	Satellite imagery	–	€240 million contract signed in July 2025 with access to PlanetScope and SkySat data and AI systems.
Geo-locating
Galileo PRS	–	–	European Union	Military geo-locating satellites	–	

== Equipment on order ==
=== Aircraft on order ===
Aircraft	Variant	Image	Origin	Type	Quantity ordered	Planned to enter service in	Notes
Combat aircraft
Eurofighter Typhoon	T4 Quadriga; 1-seat		Germany; Italy; Spain; United Kingdom	Swingrole	30	2028	3 aircraft will be used for further development of the Eurofighter programme.
Eurofighter Typhoon	T4 Quadriga; 2-seat	–	Germany; Italy; Spain; United Kingdom	Swingrole	8	2028	3 aircraft will be used for further development of the Eurofighter programme.
Eurofighter Typhoon	T5	–	Germany; Italy; Spain; United Kingdom; Sweden	Swingrole	20	2031	Purchase approved in October 2025, worth €3.75 billion.
Eurofighter Typhoon	ECR	–	Germany; Italy; Spain; United Kingdom; Sweden	SEAD / ECR; Suppression of enemy air defence / Electronic Combat Reconnaissance	15	2030	Development contract signed in November 2023. Transformed from existing 2-seat Eurofighter. Saab Arexis sensor suite selected in March 2024, support by Helsing for the AI platform. Contract for the jamming pods signed in autumn 2025.
Special mission aircraft
PEGASUS	Bombardier Global 6000		Germany; Canada	SIGINT	3	2026	Ordered in 2021.
UAVs
Eurodrone	–		France; Germany; Italy; Spain	UCAV; MALE; ISR	21	2030	7 systems on contract with 21 drones for €3 billion
Transport helicopters
CH-47 Chinook	CH-47F Block II SR AAR		United States	Heavy transport helicopter	60	2027 - 2032	Ordered in July 2023.
Trainer aircraft
Bombardier Global 6000	Global 6000		Canada	Operational conversion trainer	1	–	Purchase of a second-hand aircraft approved in July 2026, to be used for pilot training as part of the PEGASUS project. The contract was signed with Lufthansa Technik in August 2026.

=== Aircraft equipment on order ===
Model	Variant	Image	Origin	Type	To be used with	Quantity ordered	Notes
Radars
Euroradar CAPTOR	CAPTOR ECRS Mk1 - Step 1		Germany; Spain	GaN, AESA radar	Eurofighter (T2, T3)	110	These new radars will equip current aircraft, and aircraft to enter service. Orders: 110 ECRS Mk1 Step 1 radars ordered for the refurbishment of the German Eurofighter T2 and T3 in June 2020 by Airbus.; 38 ECRS Mk1 Step 1 radars ordered in 2023 for the new Eurofighter ordered under the Quadriga project (initially Mk0 variant, later on, switched to the Mk1).; 20 radars ECRS Mk1 Step 2 development ordered, planned to be used with the Eurofighter T5, they will add electronic warfare capabilities (ESM and EA).
Euroradar CAPTOR	CAPTOR ECRS Mk1 - Step 1		Germany; Spain	GaN, AESA radar	Eurofighter (T4)	38	
Euroradar CAPTOR	CAPTOR ECRS Mk1 Step 2		Germany; Spain	GaN, AESA radar	Eurofighter (T5)	20	
Electronic warfare
Saab Arexis EW suite	–		Sweden; Germany	Electronic warfare suite	Eurofighter (EK)	15	The first purchase was for the Arexis suite in March 2024, followed by a complementary contract to include an AI system in November 2024. The suite includes: GaN, ECM / ELS wingtip pods; Additional GaN-based low-band antenna; Helsing Cirra AI system; The 15 Eurofighter EK will be equipped with these systems, and the Eurofighter T5 will also receive those systems.
Saab Arexis EW suite	–		Sweden; Germany	Electronic warfare suite	Eurofighter (T5)	20	The first purchase was for the Arexis suite in March 2024, followed by a complementary contract to include an AI system in November 2024. The suite includes: GaN, ECM / ELS wingtip pods; Additional GaN-based low-band antenna; Helsing Cirra AI system; The 15 Eurofighter EK will be equipped with these systems, and the Eurofighter T5 will also receive those systems.
Praetorian DASS	Praetorian eVo	–	United Kingdom; Italy; Spain; Germany	Self-protection EW	Eurofighter (T4)	38	This new generation will equip the Eurofighter Tranche 4.
Hardware
AMK	–	–	United Kingdom; Italy; Spain; Germany	Fuselage strakes and leading-edge root extensions	Eurofighter (T2, T3, T4, T5)	–	Development contract signed for the AMK by Germany. The result of the changes are: 25% of maximum wing lift increase; 45% increased AOA; 100% increased roll-rate; higher turn rate, tighter turn radius; improved noise pointing at low speed, increasing the air-to-surface weapon capacity

=== Aircraft weapons on order ===
Model	Variant	Image	Origin	Type	To be used with	Quantity ordered	Notes
Cannons
GAU-22	GAU-22/A		United States	Rotary cannon 25×137mm	F-35A Lightning II	35 (1 gun per F-35A)	It is the 4 barrels variant of the GAU-12 Equalizer.
Dillon Aero 503; MG7	Dillon Aero 503D	(illustration)	United States	3-barrel rotary cannon 12.7×99mm NATO	CH-47F Block II SR AAR	–	Ordered in June 2026, to be used on the rear ramp.
BVR air-to-air missiles
AIM-120 AMRAAM	AIM-120C-8		United States	BVR, radar homing, air-to-air missile	F-35A Lightning II	237 (+ 837 option)	Approvals DSCA: 105 missiles with the F-35 purchase; 969 missiles in July 2023; Firm orders: December 2022, with the F-35A contract: 105 missiles; 32 training missiles; May 2024, €178 million: 80 missiles; 32 training missiles; September 2024, €121.6 million: 52 missiles; 52 training missiles
AIM-120 AMRAAM	AIM-120C-8 - training missile		United States	BVR, radar homing, air-to-air missile	F-35A Lightning II	114	Approvals DSCA: 105 missiles with the F-35 purchase; 969 missiles in July 2023; Firm orders: December 2022, with the F-35A contract: 105 missiles; 32 training missiles; May 2024, €178 million: 80 missiles; 32 training missiles; September 2024, €121.6 million: 52 missiles; 52 training missiles
Short range air-to-air missiles
AIM-9 Sidewinder	AIM-9X Block II+		United States	Infrared homing, short range air-to-air missile	F-35A Lightning II	75	Approved with the F-35A purchase, worth €109 million.
AIM-9 Sidewinder	AIM-9PX CATM training		United States	Training missile, infrared homing, short range air-to-air missile	F-35A Lightning II	30	Approved with the F-35A purchase, worth €109 million.
Strategic weapons
B61 nuclear bomb	B61 Mod 12		United States	Thermonuclear gravity bomb	F-35A Lightning II	–	NATO nuclear defence sharing.
Air-to-surface missiles
Taurus	Taurus Neo		Germany; Sweden	Land attack cruise missile	Eurofighter (T2, T3, T4, T5)	–	Contract signed in December 2025.
Joint Strike Missile	–		Norway	Anti-ship cruise missile / Land attack cruise missile	F-35A Lightning II	–	Budget approvals: June 2025 (budget of € 564 million).; December 2025.; Contracts signed: July 2025, worth €478.7 million, with deliveries to start in 2027; May 2026, worth €300 million.
Brimstone 3	–		United Kingdom; Germany (final assembly)	Ground attack missile	Eurofighter (T2, T3, T4, T5)	379 (+ 2,887 in option)	Framework agreement in June 2024 for 3,266 missiles. Firm orders: June 2024, €376 million; 29 missiles for operational testing + 75 missiles for telemetry (UK made); 274 missiles (German made)
Weapon loaders
IGLUS1	–	–	Austria	Cannon loader	Eurofighter (T1, T2, T3, T4, T5)	–	System to load ammunition for the Mauser BK-27 cannon ordered in 2026, to be delivered by the end of 2027.

=== Air defence systems on order ===
System	Image	Origin	Type	Quantity ordered	Notes
SAM Systems
MIM-104 Patriot PAC-3+ Part of the ESSI		Germany; United States	SAM / Anti-ballistic missile	10	Orders: 4 fire units ordered from Raytheon, confirmed in March 2024, for $1.2 billion.; 4 fire units approved by the parliament in July 2024 for €1.35 billion.; 2 fire units approved by parliament in October 2026 for €650 million, ordered in November 2026.; The contracts include the batteries (called "fire units" in Bundeswehr parlance), spare parts and support services.
SAM missiles
MIM-104 Patriot - PAC-2 GEM-T	–	Germany; United States	Surface-to-air missiles	200 (+ 300 on option)	Framework agreement for up to 500 missiles approved in December 2023 for €3.01 billion. The missiles will be assembled in Germany, and the main subcontractors will be MBDA, Bayern Chemie, TDW Gesellschaft für Wirksysteme, Sener Aerospacial and RTX. Orders: 100 confirmed order for €602.1 million; 100 ordered in August 2024 for €430 million (after approval by the Bundestag in July 2024)
MIM-104 Patriot - PAC-3 MSE		United States	Surface-to-air missiles	248	Germany cleared by DSCA to purchase up to 600 missiles in August 2024. In December 2024, the German parliament approved the purchase of 120 and 128 missiles in two different instances. Additional purchase approved in December 2025.

=== Space equipment on order ===
Aircraft	Variant	Image	Origin	Type	Quantity ordered	Notes
Space plane
POLARIS Aurora	–	–	Germany	Hypersonic reusable space place	–	
Communications
SATCOMBw	SATCOMBw-3	(illustration)	Germany	Geostationary communication satellite	2	Contract signed for the next-generation of communication satellite that will succeed to the SATCOMBw-1 and SATCOMBw-2. It will be launched by two Ariane 6 in 2029.
Earth surface equipment
Indra S3TSR "L-Guard" (LEO- Ground based Upscaled AESA RaDar)	–	–	Spain	Space surveillance radar	1	Low Earth orbit surveillance radar operating from 200 to 2,000 km. Part of the WRÜbwR programme (Weltraumüberwachungsradars), approved for purchase in December 2024. Ordered in February 2025 to Indra.

== Equipment planned to be ordered ==
=== Aircraft planned to be ordered ===
Aircraft	Variant	Image	Origin	Type	Quantity planned	Planned to enter service in	Notes
Combat aircraft
Next Generation Fighter	–	–	–	6th generation swingrole jet fighter	–	2040	Successor of the Eurofighter.
Special mission aircraft
PEGASUS	Global 6000		Germany; Canada	SIGINT	–	–	Hensoldt hinted in October 2024 that there would be additional aircraft purchased by the German Air Force as three aircraft seem insufficient for the needs.
Fixed-wing platform to be selected	LuWES	–	–	Electronic warfare	–	–	Airborne Effects in the Electromagnetic Spectrum planned to be purchased, potential platforms include business jets, Airbus airliners or the Airbus A400M Atlas.
Drones
Airbus / Helsing wingman concept	–	–	Germany	Stealthy UAV, loyal wingman	–	–	Drone to support Eurofighter T5, and the SCAF. MUM-T (manned-unmanned teaming) capable aircraft.
Transport helicopters
NATO NGRC; NATO Next Generation Rotorcraft Capability	–	–	France; Germany; Greece; Italy; Netherlands; United Kingdom	Medium helicopter, transport / ASW / ASuW / SAR / VERTREP	–	–	
VIP transport
Transport helicopter to be selected	–	–	–	VIP transport	3	–	€200 million budget for the replacement of the 3 Eurocopter AS532. It is planned to be replaced from 2027 (after 30 years in service).

=== Aircraft equipment planned to be ordered ===
Model	Variant	Image	Origin	Type	Would be used with	Quantity planned	Notes
Radar
Euroradar CAPTOR	CAPTOR ECRS Mk1 - Step 1		Germany; Spain	GaN, AESA radar	Eurofighter EK	15	Planned to be used with the Eurofighter EK, not yet ordered.

=== Aircraft weapons planned to be ordered ===
Model	Variant	Image	Origin	Type	Would be used with	Quantity planned	Notes
BVR air-to-air missiles
AIM-120 AMRAAM	AIM-120D-3		United States	BVR, radar homing, air-to-air missile	F-35A Lightning II	400	Approved sales by the DSCA, negotiations ongoing: 400 approved by the DSCA in September 2025; Budget approved by the German government.
Air-to-surface missiles
AGM-158 JASSM	AGM-158B / B2 JASSM - ER		United States	Land attack cruise missile	F-35A Lightning II	75	Planned by the Bundeswehr and approved for purchased by the DSCA. As of August 2026, it was confirmed that the purchase was postponed.
Miscellaneous
Diehl FEANIX; Future Effector – Adaptable, Networked, Intelligent, Xpendable	–		Germany; Spain	Effector (long range sensor / remote carrier)	Eurofighter (T2, T3, T4, T5); Airbus A400M	–	Collaboration with Sener.
MBDA Deutschland RCM²	–		Germany	Effector (long range sensor / remote carrier)	Eurofighter (T2, T3, T4, T5); Airbus A400M	–	
MBDA SPEAR	SPEAR-EW		United Kingdom	Stand-in jammer (decoy missile with electronic warfare)	Eurofighter (EK)	–	
Guided bombs
GBU-53/B StormBreaker; SDB II (small diameter bomb II)	–		United States	Precision-guided glide bomb 250 lb (110 kg)	F-35A Lightning II	344	
Unguided bombs
BLU-109	–		Italy / United States	Bunker buster bomb 2,000 lb (910 kg)	F-35A Lightning II	162	Offered with the GBU-31 JDAM guidance kit.
Mark 82	–		Italy / United States	Gravity bomb 500 lb (230 kg)	F-35A Lightning II	264	Offered with the GBU-54 guidance kit.
Bomb guidance kits
GBU-31 JDAM	–		United States	Precision guidance kit	F-35A Lightning II	180	Warhead:BLU-109 2,000 lb (910 kg) bomb.
GBU-54 JDAM (DSU-38)	–		United States	Precision guidance kit (dual mode GPS / laser)	F-35A Lightning II	246	Warhead: Mark 82, 500 lb (230 kg) bomb.

=== Air defence planned to be ordered ===
System	Image	Origin	Type	Quantity planned	Notes
IRIS-T SLM	–	Germany	Short-to-medium range missile fire unit	50	
IRIS-T SLX	–	Germany	Medium range anti-air missile	–	To be integrated into the IRIS-T SLM systems.

=== Space equipment planned to be ordered ===
Germany plans to spend €35 billion on space security (September 2025), it includes satellite constellations, ground stations, secure launch capabilities into space.

Aircraft	Variant	Image	Origin	Type	Quantity planned	Notes
Communications
SATCOMBw	SATcom Stufe 4	(illustration)	–	SATcom Level 4 - LEO; Satellite communication - low earth orbit	~ 100	Planned investments.
Surveillance
Space-based signals intelligence	–	–	Germany	ELINT / SIGINT satellite	–	Planned investments, expected to be supplied by Rohde & Schwarz and Orbint GmbH.

== See also ==
- Luftstreitkräfte der NVA
- Glossary of German military terms
- Kommando LSK/LV
- List of military aircraft of Germany
- Luftwaffenmuseum, Berlin
