= Praetorian DASS =

Military airplane defensive hardware and software

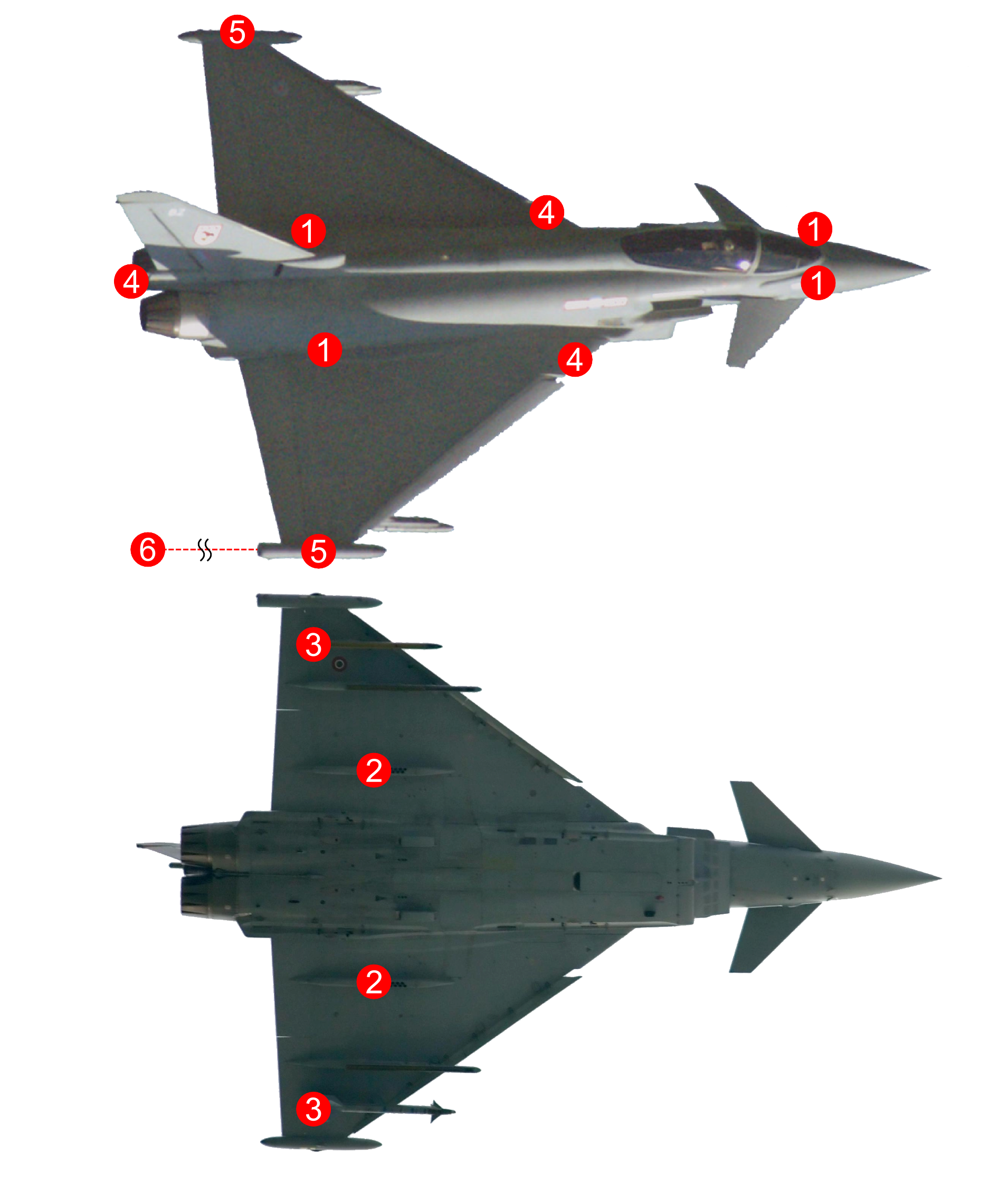
Praetorian DASS: 1. Laser warners; 2. Flare launchers (IR decoys); 3. Chaff dispensers; 4. Missile warners; 5. Wingtip pods for ESCM; 6. Towed decoy

The EuroDASS Praetorian DASS is an integral part of Eurofighter Typhoon defensive Aid Sub-System (DASS) providing threat assessment, aircraft protection and support measures in extremely hostile and severe environments. As the DASS is fully integrated, it does not require additional pods that take up weapon stations or would influence the aircraft's aerodynamic performance. The modular nature of the DASS simplifies future upgrades and allows each partner nation or export customer the option to tailor the DASS to their individual needs.

== History ==
The DASS for the Eurofighter Typhoon was intended to be a collaborative effort between the UK, Germany, Spain and Italy. However, integration of the system turned out to be very expensive, so much so that in November 1991, Germany left the programme and initiate its own defense system to equip its Typhoons. In February 1992, before signing the £1.5 billion contract for the DASS, Spain also had doubts about the financial viability and withdrew. This left only the UK and Italy in the consortium, now named EuroDASS (European Defensive Aids Sub-System), to be awarded an initial contract of £200 million ($340 million) with the work shares split 60% to GEC-Marconi (now Leonardo) and 40% Elettronica. By 1995, Spain had decided to rejoin the EuroDASS consortium and a contract was signed with Elettronica to allow INDRA to participate.

In May 1996, Germany had found their national system being developed by DASA was too expensive. In 1997, DASA looked to join the EuroDASS consortium proposing to use the towed radar decoy (TRD) it had developed. These discussions failed as GEC-Marconi had already developed their TRD, known as the Ariel, that had been tested up to mach 2 and was operational with the RAF while the DASA's TRD had only been tested up to mach 1.4 and was not integrated into the Defensive Aids Computer (DAC).

== Technology ==
The Praetorian system is a modular system consisting of antennas for electronic countermeasures (ECM), electronic support measures (ESM), missile approach warning systems (MAW), laser warning receivers (LWR) and Towed radar decoy (TRD). The system is divided into 20 major line replaceable units (LRU) with all the components controlled by a Teldix GmbH Defensive Aids Computer (DAC) on MIL-STD-1553 databus. The DAC is connected via fiber optic cables to STANAG 3910 in the avionics, with the entire DAC system controlled by five Radstone PowerPC-4 processors, that have a tenfold increase in computing power compared to the original five Motorola 68020 CPUs. It is fully automatic, which greatly relieves the workload for the pilot in combat but the pilot can manually override.

=== ESM-RWR ===
The DASS includes electronic support measures (ESM) and is equipped with radar-warning-receivers (RWR). The RWR is designed to detect threat radars using super heterodyne, digital receiver antennas which are located into the wing tip pods giving full 360° coverage with an accuracy better than 1°. These passive antennas can identify radio frequencies of 100 MHz up to 10 GHz, which is sufficient to detect nearly all types of radar systems and even to detect other RF sources such as radios or datalink systems. The data is compared with the database of radar signatures stored in the Electronic Support Measures suite (ESM). Using this information the ESM allows the identification of the radar and thus the platform it is deployed from and presents it on a moving map or multifunction display producing a 360° threat picture around the aircraft including identifying targets and even their zones of lethality. This allows the pilot to fly around these zones to avoid detection or being engaged. Thus the system not only warns a pilot but it helps him to look out for potential targets.

=== Laser Warning Receiver (LWR) ===
To counter the threat of laser guided weapons a Laser Warning Receiver, LWR, are installed on UK and Saudi Typhoons. These LWRs are optimized for low false alarm rates and can detect lasers pointing at the aircraft and find the direction of the laser source. There are four LWRs on the eurofighter fuselage capable of detecting any incoming laser radiation and determine its bearing, two are located in front of the canards on the front fuselage and the remaining two at the rear behind the wing.

=== ECM ===
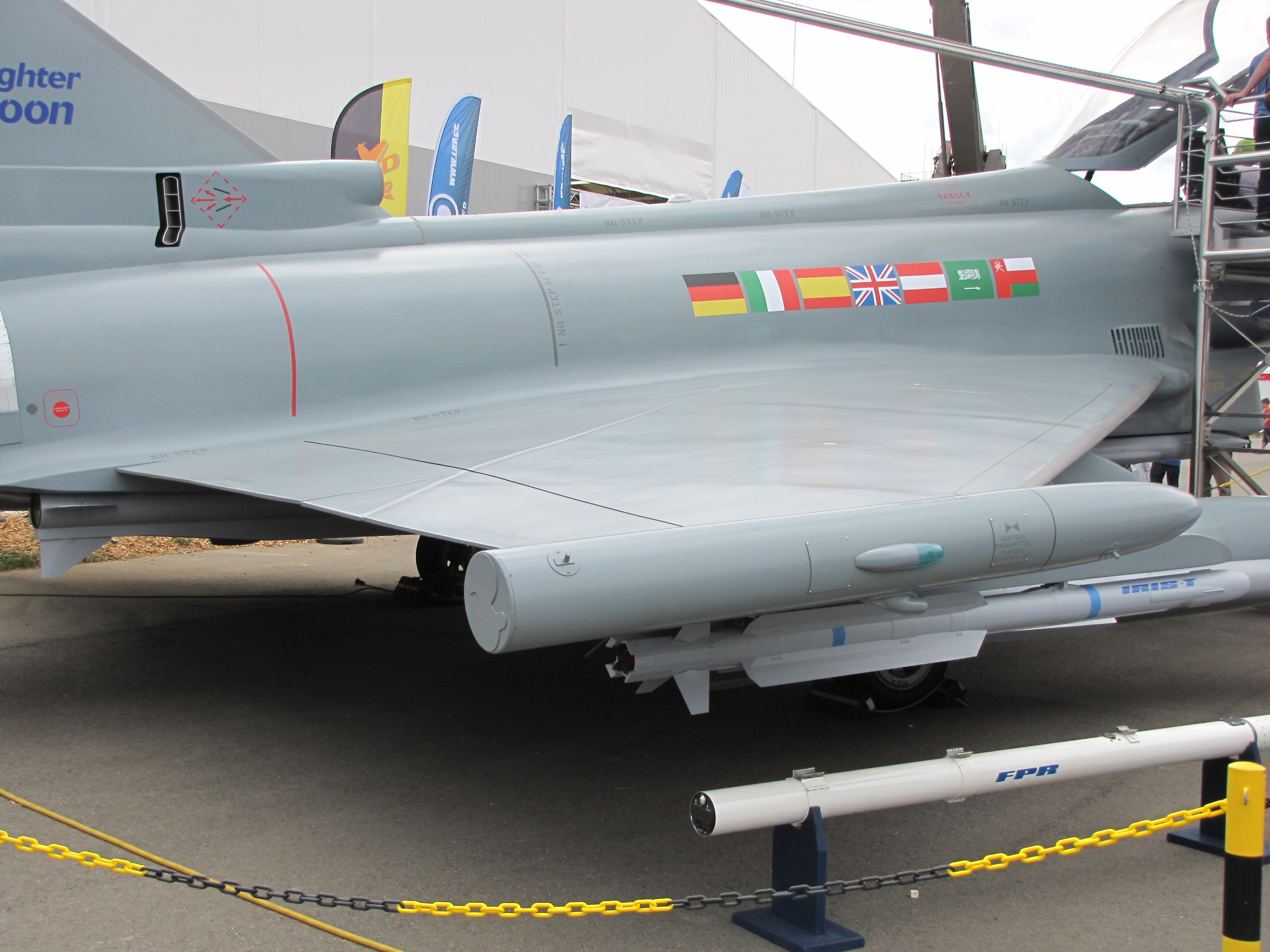
ECM wingtip pod

The Eurofighter Typhoon features an internal electronic countermeasures system (ECM) that uses a digital radio frequency memory (DRFM) and a digital frequency techniques generator to jam multiple airborne and ground-based radar systems at the same time and at long ranges. Each transmitter and receiver modules (T/R) consists of Vivaldi antennas that can passively locate emitters. The antennas are located in front of the wing tip pods, and another at the rear end of the left pod thus ensuring a 360 ° coverage. The T/R modules of AESAS are GaAs-MMIC based and operating in the 6–18 GHz frequency range. The output per module is 27 dBm (0.5 W), before being amplified by 20 dB (100 times), resulting in 50 Watt radiation performance. It is possible that the Cross Eye (X-Eye) system developed by Elettronica will be retrofitted by inserting a second antenna in the right-wing pod. As part of the Phase 1 Enhancement (P1E), Typhoons received new antennas, extending the frequency range and increasing the power and improved DRFM- and ECM techniques.

=== Missile Approach Warner (MAW) ===
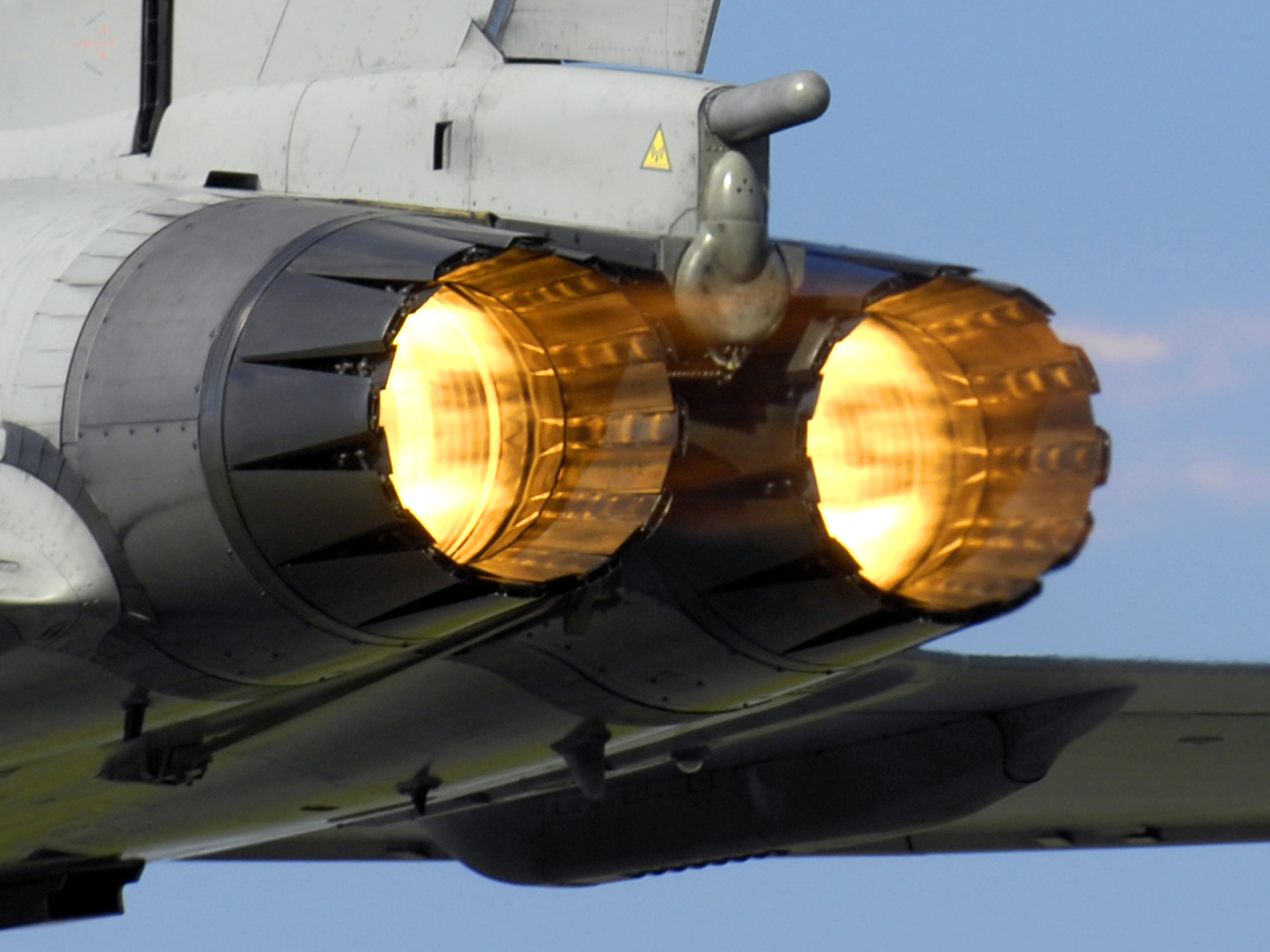
The cylindrical pod pointing backwards, just above the engines, is the missile approach warning receiver

To track missiles launched at the Typhoon, the DASS incorporates three Missile Approach Warners (MAW), one in each wing root and one in the tail to provide a full 360° azimuth coverage around the aircraft. In 1991, GEC-Plessey Avionics received the order to develop the missile approach warner derived from their PVS2000 MAW and utilises an active, millimeter-wave Ka-band (32–38 GHz) pulse-doppler radar for detection. Since the units are active they are able to detect not only radar guided ordnance but also passive weapons such as infrared guided short range missiles. They can detect multiple missiles launched towards the aircraft in all weather conditions and even after the rocket motor's burnout phase. Once a missile is detected it will identify the threat according to whether it is radar or IR guided and display its location on the MFDs. The MAW can automatically activate the chaff/flare dispensers as required.

=== Countermeasure Dispenser Systems ===
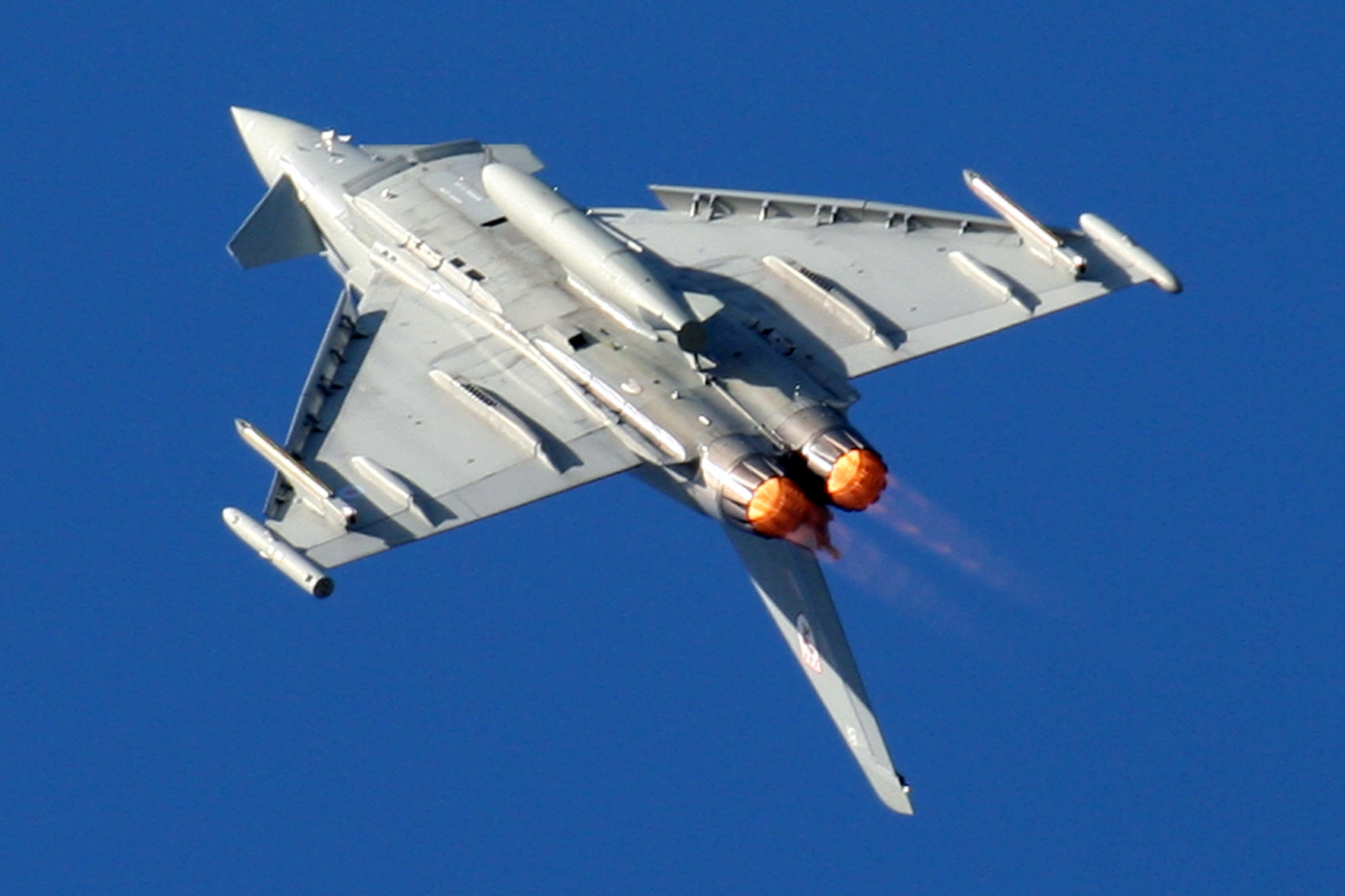
Chaff and flare dispensers under the wings

The Eurofighter includes four chaff/flare launchers mounted under the wings, namely two Saab BOL-510 dispensers and two Cobham plc / Elettronica Aster 55mm flare dispensers. These countermeasures are controlled automatically by the DAC and, in response to an immediate threat, by the Missile Approach Warners or even manually by the pilot.

The two Saab BOL-510 dispensers are located at the end of LAU-7 launch rails near the outer wing tips ensures a good distribution of the decoys in the wake vortices, in addition small air intakes at the end of each dispenser generate more vortices. Each dispenser can be loaded with 160 packets of chaff/flares giving the Eurofighter a total of 320 chaff/flare cartridges (total weight 7–9 kg), consisting of the following decoys:

- Chaff RR-184.
- Flare MJU-52 / B.

The two 55 mm flare dispensers contain 16 decoy rounds each, giving a total capacity of 32 flares per aircraft, and are located into the actuators housing of the inner trailing edge flaperons. The decoys will be automatically deployed in intelligent pre-programmed sequences when a missile is launched. There are two types of ammunition available:

- Cartridge Countermeasure 55mm Typhoon IR Decoy. Formerly known as Typhoon IR Decoy No1 Mk1 they were specifically developed for the Typhoon by Chemring Group. Each decoy weighs 0.725 kg and are automatically deployed in intelligent preprogrammed sequences.
- BriteCloud Expendable Active Decoy. The DRFM-based active RF countermeasure is up to 375 mm long, 0.7 to 0.85 kg in weight and has a shelf life of about five years. The transmitter produces active emissions for at least 10 seconds. Other Platforms that can be equipped include the Saab Gripen and Panavia Tornado.

On 25 July 2018, Saab received an order from BAE Systems for development of the Smart Dispenser System (SDS), a pyrotechnic smart self-protection system for the Royal Air Force's (RAF) Typhoons and future Eurofighter opportunities. "This new smart dispenser system provides a significant increase in self-protection capability to defeat modern threats by dispensing optimised countermeasure sequences and directions. SDS will significantly enhance the combat survivability of the Eurofighter Typhoon", says Anders Carp, head of Saab business area Surveillance. "Saab´s electromechanical self-protection system BOL has been in use on Eurofighter since its inception, and we are now looking forward to strengthening the platform’s countermeasure capability through SDS." The development and integration work of SDS will be carried out at the Saab site in Sweden and finished around 2020.

=== Towed Radar Decoy (TRD) ===
In addition to the onboard ECM, another active countermeasure is the Towed Radar Decoy or TRD. Either one or two Ariel Mk II TRD from Leonardo will be carried in the rear of starboard wingtip pod, and deployed from the pod on a 100 m long Kevlar cable containing a FibreOptic link and a separate power line. The Ariel Mk II is a development of BAE Systems Ariel system which was successfully deployed on RAF Tornados and Nimrods but is physically smaller to enable carriage in the Typhoon's pods. The TRD can tolerate speeds of up to Mach 2 and loads of + 9 / -3g and will be capable of being recovered or jettisoned as the situation requires. The TRDs are effective against a variety of different radar systems like monopulse, TWS (Track While Scan) or CLOS (Command Line Of Sight) radars. As the TRD is an offboard jammer, radar systems featuring a home on jam mode (HOJ) will not be able to directly lock on to the aircraft itself. The effectiveness is further enhanced by the release of Chaff clouds making the decoy a more attractive target for the missile.
