= Hensoldt Pegasus =

German reconnaissance platform

PEGASUS
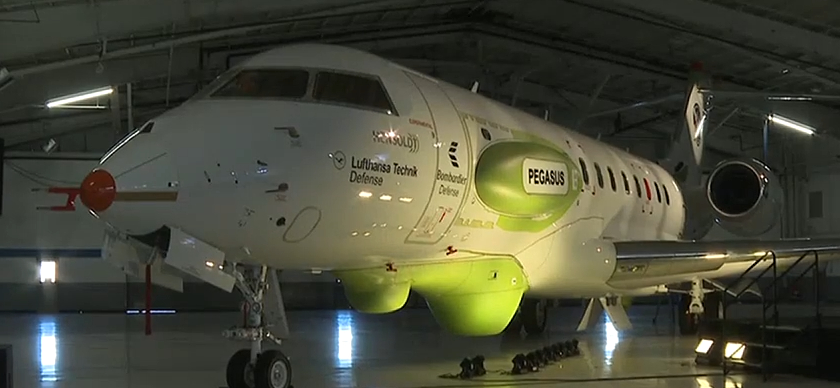

General information
- Role: SIGINT and reconnaissance
- National origin: Germany; Canada; United States
- Manufacturer: General contractor: Hensoldt; Sub-contractors / systems supplies: Hensoldt; Bombardier Aviation; Bombardier Defense; Lufthansa Technik Defense
- Service: German Air Force
- Number built: 3 (being manufactured)

History
- Manufactured: Since 2022
- Introduction date: Planned for 2027
- Initiated: June 2021.
- Developed from: Global 6000

The PEGASUS (an abbreviation of "persistent German airborne surveillance system") is a project to provide the Bundeswehr with airborne long-range signal-centric surveillance and reconnaissance capability with three systems (mission system for signal detection and carrier platform). Hensoldt is the German defence technology firm serving as the project's general contractor; other companies involved include Bombardier Defense and Lufthansa Technik Defense

In the aftermath of the cancellation of the EuroHawk unmanned aerial vehicle (UAV) in 2013, which had been the intended platform for the German Air Force's SIGINT capability, it was decided to order a manned platform instead. In early 2020, the PEGASUS programme was launched, based on the Bombardier Global 6000 business jet. The programme was originally to include three aircraft accompanies by the associated mission, evaluation, reference, and training systems. The PEGASUS is intended to detect and record military radio traffic and radar emissions in order to create situation reports and obtain data for defence systems. The platform is intended to contribute to early crisis detection, situation assessment, and the determination of threats within assigned operational areas of interest.

In November 2025, it was announced that at least six aircraft would be ordered for the PEGASUS programme. It has also been reported that the Royal Air Force (RAF) is interested in the type.

== Development ==
=== Background ===
The origins of the Pegasus can be traced back to the decommissioning of the German Navy's Breguet 1150 M Atlantic in 2010, which left a long-lasting capability gap in the Bundeswehr in the area of signal-detecting airborne long-range surveillance and reconnaissance capability. During the late 2000s and early 2010s, work was undertaken on developing the RQ-4 Global Hawk unmanned aerial vehicle (UAV) into a specialised variant, known as EuroHawk, that was originally intended as the delivery system for this capability. However, the EuroHawk was reportedly not capable of being certifiable under ICAO rules without an anti-collision system; thus preventing any operations within European airspace or the airspace of any ICAO member; accordingly, on 15 May 2013, the German government announced the immediate termination of the Eurohawk program.

While some considerations were made to the potential reactivation of the EuroHawk program in the aftermath of unsuccessful attempts to test the reconnaissance systems developed for it on alternative platforms, including Airbus aircraft and an Israeli drone, in early 2020, it was announced that the new electronic surveillance delivery system would consist of a crewed aircraft based on the Bombardier Global 6000 business jet. At the time of this announcement, it was stated that the procurement choice had been driven by the high cost of the UAVs ($2.5 billion) as well as the risk not meeting the operational deadline of 2025 due to European safety standards for uncrewed aircraft's access to the civilian airspace.

As per its original order, the PEGASUS programme was set to include three aircraft with accompanying mission systems, alongside an evaluation, reference, and training system, and had a projected financial cost of around €1.54 billion.

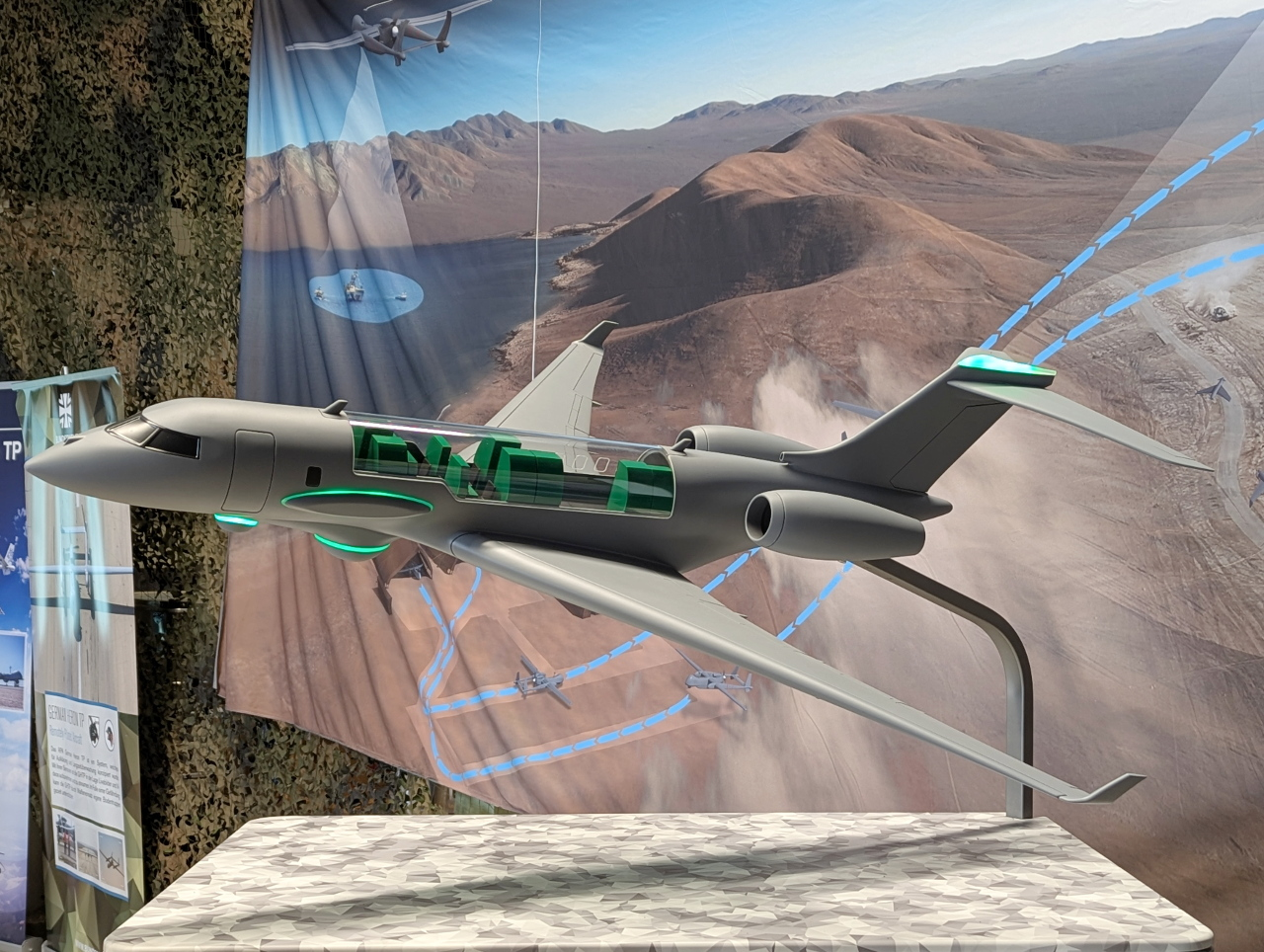
Mock-up of the Pegasus

=== Structure and function ===
The general contractor for the platform is Hensoldt, while Lufthansa Technik is responsible for the aircraft themselves as well as integration activities. A total of almost 30 companies from Germany are involved in the project.

In June 2021, the associated bill for the programme was submitted to the Defense Committee of the German Bundestag; approval authorised the programme to proceed into the implementation phase. During November 2023, following a series of hardware and software demonstrations, PEGASUS passed its critical design review. Since 2023, financing has come from the Bundeswehr special fund. The basic qualification for the SLWÜA should be achieved in 2027. The first flight of PEGASUS finally took place at the Bombardier site in Wichita in the second half of September 2024. PEGASUS is to be stationed at Tactical Air Force Squadron 51 "Immelmann" at Schleswig Air Base.

Operationally, Pegasus will provide early warning of force movements and electronic activity; enabling the precise targeting of enemy radar and air-defence systems, and being a key element for supplying targeting information for other new Bundeswehr platforms, such as the Eurofighter Typhoon. In addition to Pegasus as an airborne project, the Fleet Service Boat Class 424 project serves to maintain capabilities in the area of signal-detecting sea-based long-range surveillance and reconnaissance.

== Specifications ==
Data from Airport Technology

General characteristics

- Crew: 2 pilots + SIGINT crew
- Length: 30.30 m (99 ft 5 in)
- Wingspan: 28.70 m (94 ft 2 in)
- Height: 7.80 m (25 ft 7 in)
- Max takeoff weight: 45,246 kg (99,750 lb)
- Fuel capacity: 20.43 t (45,000 lb)
- Cabin height: 1.88 m (6.2 ft)
- Cabin width: 2.41 m (7.9 ft)
- Cabin length: 14.80 m (48.6 ft)
- Powerplant: 2 × BR700-710A2-20 turbofan, 65.6 kN (14,700 lbf) thrust each

Performance

- Maximum speed: 946 km/h (588 mph, 511 kn) (0.89 Mach at a cruise altitude of 41,000 ft (12,000 m))
- Cruise speed: 904 km/h (562 mph, 488 kn) (0.85 Mach at a cruise altitude of 41,000 ft (12,000 m))
- Range: 6,000 km (3,700 mi, 3,200 nmi)
- Service ceiling: 16,000 m (51,000 ft)

Avionics

- Flight avionic: Bombardier Vision (four large displays, a head-up display, an enhanced vision system and synthetic vision system, graphic flight planning and multiscan weather radar)
- Radar and radio electronic signal collection and analysis: Hensoldt Kalætron Integral (30MHz to 40GHz)

== Orders ==
=== Future operators ===
Germany (3)
On the 29 June 2021, the BAAINBw signed the contract to purchase 3 PEGASUS aircraft, and it includes an evaluation system, a reference system and a training system. The aircraft are planned to be delivered from 2026 to 2028.

=== Potential purchases ===
Germany
Hensoldt hinted in October 2024 that there would be additional aircraft purchased by the German Air Force as three aircraft seem insufficient for the needs.
The additional needs seem confirmed as of November 2025, and the quantity expected ranges from three to six additional aircraft.
United Kingdom
The Royal Air Force is interested in purchasing the Pegasus.
