= SATCOMBw =

German military satellite communication system

SATCOMBw is the German Bundeswehr's satellite communications system. The system was introduced in 2008; the current "Stage 2" has been in operation since the end of 2011, the system is based on the two communications satellites. The system is operated by Airbus Defense and Space. In 2022 the Budget Committee of the German Bundestag released the funds for the extension of the operator contract with Airbus as part of a 25 million euro proposal until 2028.

== System ==
Satellites	COMSATBw-1, COMSATBw-2 and rentet Intelsat Satellites
Frequencies	Ku band C band
Connectivity / capacity	2 Mbit/s / per channel (3 channels)
Encryption	SITLink (Rohde & Schwarz)
Deployment	Bundeswehr operations abroad

Images, videos and speech as well as other data can be transmitted with the system. The requirements for establishing a communication connection via SATCOMBw are comparatively complex: a ground station with a mirror that is at least 2.4 m in size must be set up. The Bundeswehr uses deployable ground stations, some are mounted on trailers. The data capacity is 2 Mbit/s per channel, encrypted by SitLink of Rohde & Schwarz.

The two Satellites COMSATBw-1 and COMSATBw-2 are at a fixed position on 66°East and 34°West providing Ku-Band and C-Band abilities. Ku-Links are fixed to connect Germany, C-Band Links has a global illumination. For additional capacity, the Bundeswehr leases Intelsat channels.

The ground control is maintained by the German Armed Forces Satellit Ground Station in Weilheim and the German Aerospace Center (DLR).

The successor project SatComBw 3 has already been launched and, according to the current planning status as of 2022, should be available in 2029.
