= Bombardier Global Express =

Large cabin business jet

Global Express
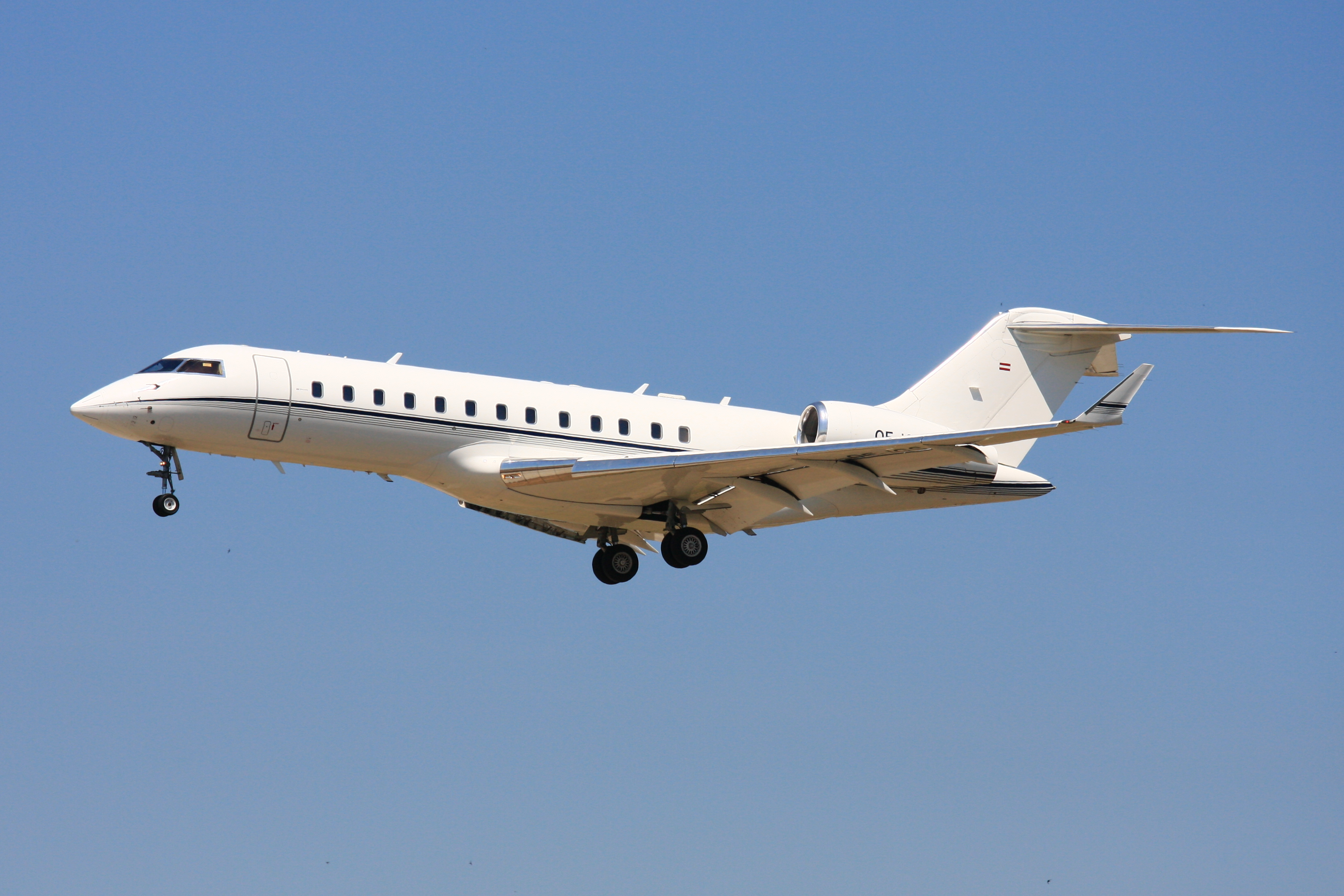

General information
- Type: Business jet
- National origin: Canada
- Manufacturer: Bombardier Aviation
- Status: In service
- Number built: 816 (Oct 2018)

History
- Manufactured: 1998–present
- Introduction date: July 1999
- First flight: 13 October 1996
- Developed from: Challenger 600 & CRJ-100/-200
- Variants: Saab GlobalEye; Raytheon Sentinel
- Developed into: Global 7500/8000

The Bombardier Global Express is a large cabin, long-range business jet designed and manufactured by Bombardier Aviation. Announced in October 1991, it first flew in October 1996, received its Canadian type certification in July 1998 and entered service in July 1999. Initially powered by two BMW/Rolls-Royce BR710s, it shares its fuselage cross section with the Canadair Regional Jet and Challenger 600 with a new wing and tail.

The shorter range Global 5000 is slightly smaller. The XRS is an improved version of the Global Express and the Global 6000 is an upgrade to the XRS that replaces the older avionics. The longer range Global 5500/6500 are powered by new Rolls-Royce Pearl engines with lower fuel burn and were unveiled in May 2018. The larger and stretched Global 7500/8000 have longer ranges.

== Development ==
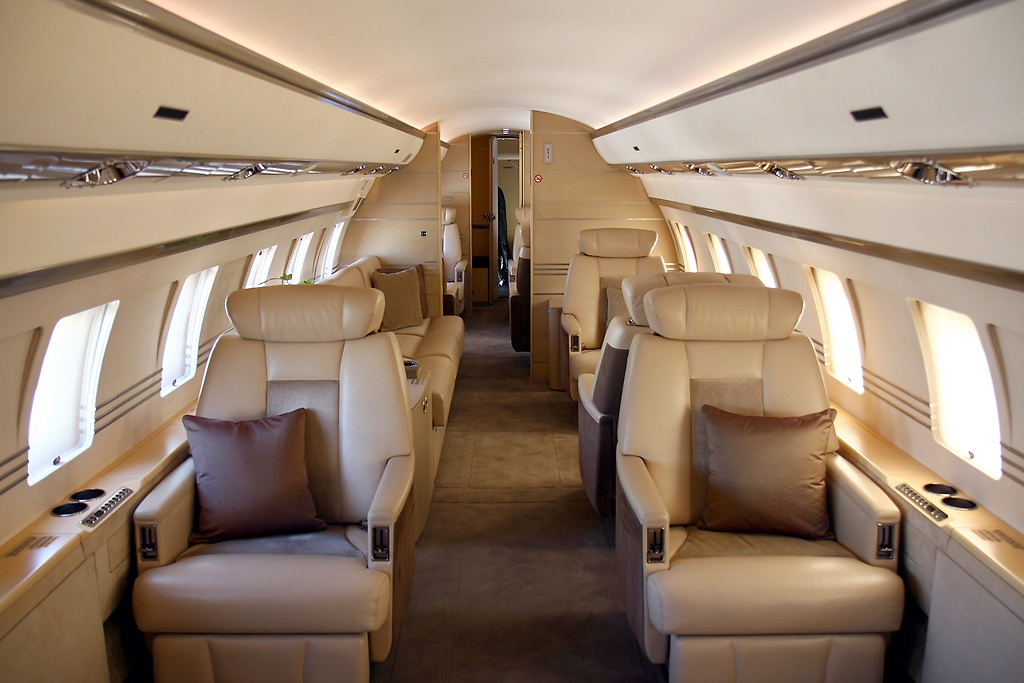
Interior cabin, the Global Express kept the Challenger 600 cross section

=== Project definition ===
After acquiring Canadair along with its Challenger 600 business jet in 1986, Bombardier studied a longer range business aircraft in which it aimed to carry eight passengers and four crew over 12,000 km (6,500 nmi) at Mach 0.85. To meet this goal, a joint-definition team was established at the company's Montreal facility in the early 1990s. By 1994, the team comprised 200 engineers, evenly divided between Canadair and various partners, including Japanese company Mitsubishi Heavy Industries and Anglo-German engine manufacturer BMW Rolls-Royce.

These partners independently designed their own elements of the aircraft and shared a stake in the program. The choice of suppliers influenced the aircraft design, with its various systems being selected before the detailed design phase. The CATIA CAD software was used for the kinematics, to feed finite-element analysis software for structural design, and computational fluid dynamics software for aerodynamics, the latter being confirmed by wind tunnel testing.

The new aircraft was designed to use the minimum number of components while still ensuring that no single failure would result in a diversion or the inability to dispatch a flight. Bombardier worked towards a 99.5% dispatch reliability goal. As operators sought a level of safety enjoyed by airline aircraft, Bombardier was influenced to use ETOPS design rules, such as the incorporation of a maintenance computer to detect, indicate, and isolate faults, although ETOPS rules were not a design requirement. A conventional mechanical flight control system was selected in the new aircraft design instead of fly-by-wire. This was mainly due to the high development expense and customer apprehension of fly-by-wire.

=== Launch and flight testing ===
In October 1991, the Global Express was unveiled at the National Business Aviation Association (NBAA) convention. In December 1993, the programme was launched. In June 1994, its high-speed configuration was frozen while the low-speed configuration was established in August 1994. By then, most critical design decisions were taken and almost all suppliers had been selected. In January 1995, the definition phase was winding down before detailed design.

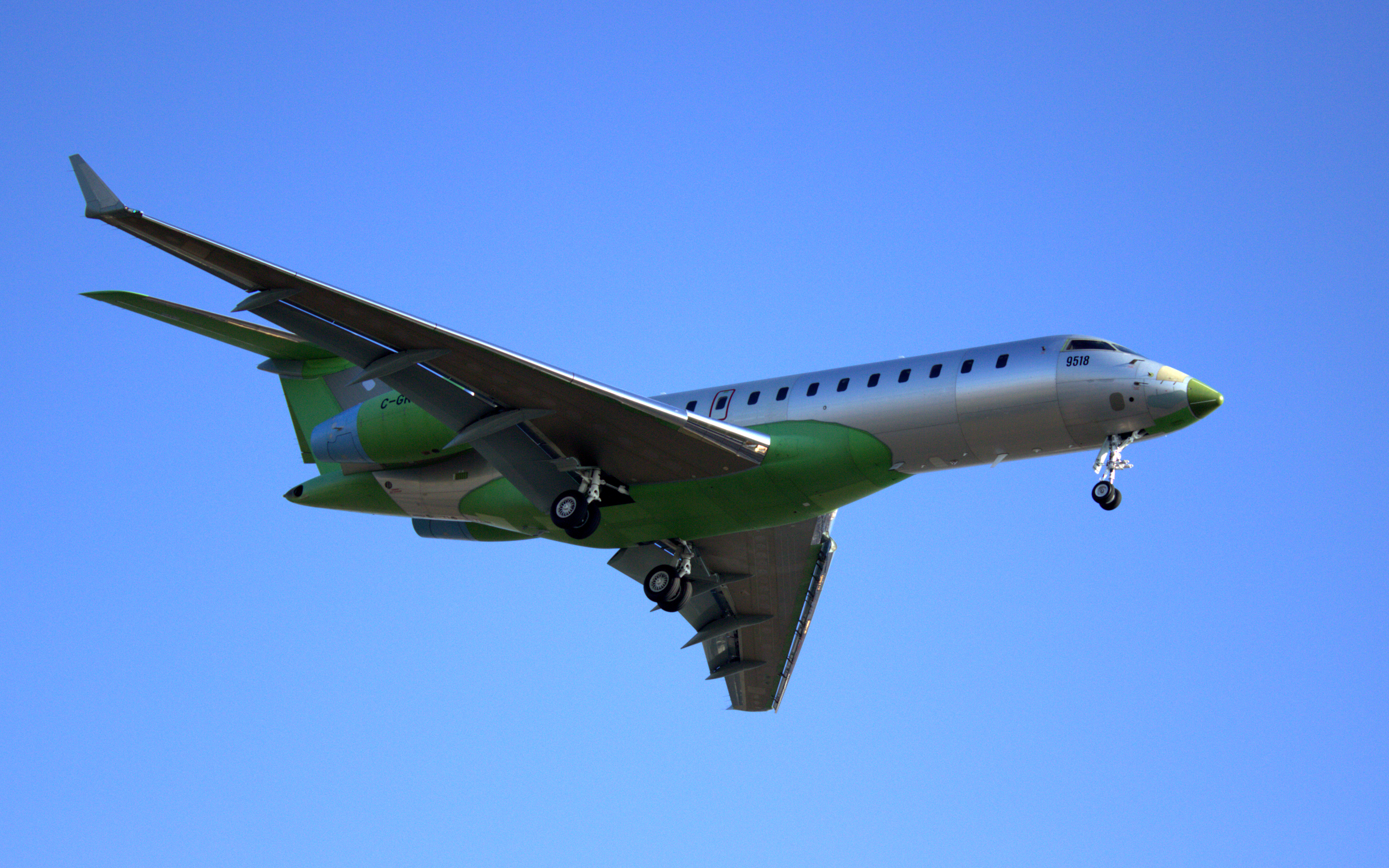
A Global BD-700 on a test flight

By June 1995, the backlog was over 40 aircraft, sold out until 2000, leading to Bombardier to expand its early production plans. At launch, range was extended to 12,000 km (6,500 nmi; 7,500 mi) to outdo rival Gulfstream. Bombardier guaranteed the empty weight and range to reply to Gulfstream criticism. Around 100 sales were needed to cover the development costs. In October 1995, the first prototype manufacture began. The first sections were expected in December at de Havilland's in Toronto, with final assembly to start in March 1996. By June 1996, the prototype was complete and conducting flight-readiness reviews ahead of its roll-out and first flight.

On 13 October 1996, the first prototype performed its maiden flight from Toronto, one month later than planned, lasting for 2 hours 46 minutes and attaining 11,000 ft (3,400 m) and 210 kn (240 mph; 390 km/h). The flight test programme used four prototypes, accumulating 2,200 flight hours. The Bombardier Flight Test Center in Wichita, Kansas was extended by 9,100 m^{2} (98,000 ft^{2}) for the test programme. In February 1997, the second prototype made its first flight and the third in May 1997.

In late 1995, type certification was forecast for March 1998. In July 1998, Canadian type certification was granted. European and US approvals followed shortly thereafter. The first 15 aircraft were to be delivered before January 1999. The Global Express entered service in July 1999.

=== Production ===
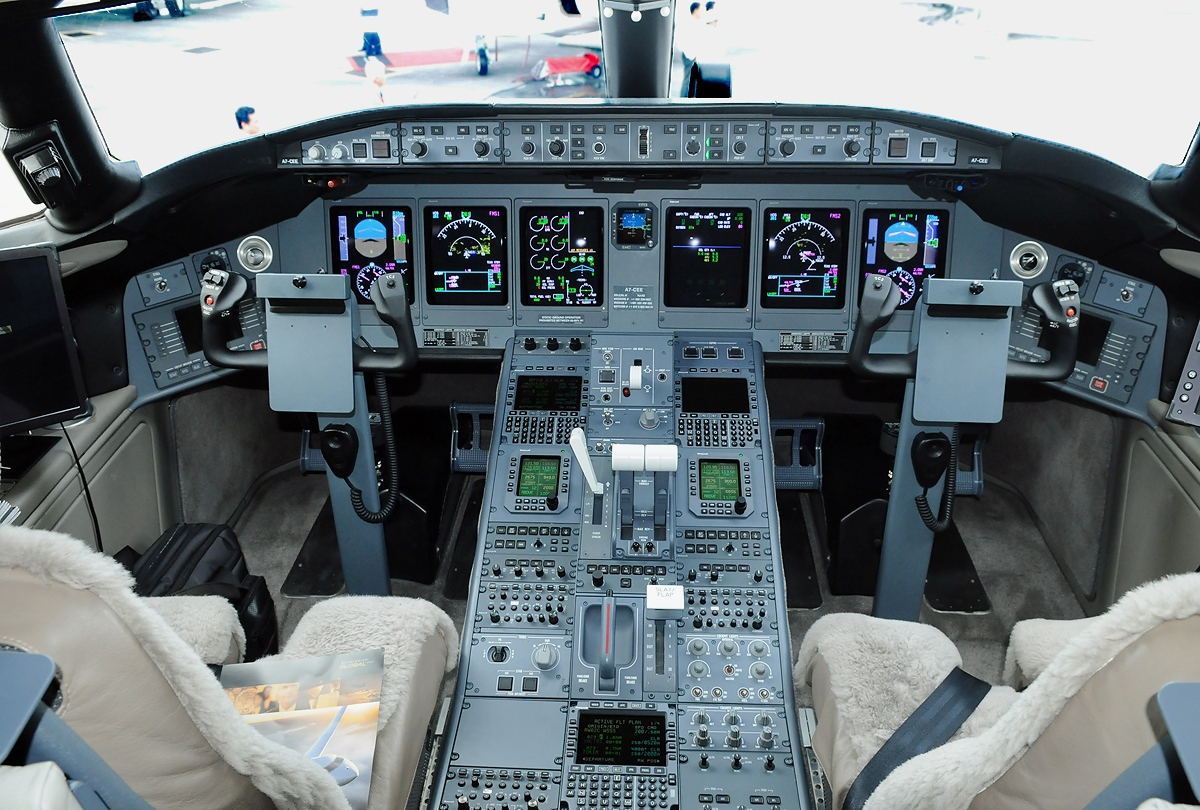
The flight deck with Honeywell Primus 2000 XP EFIS suite

Since 2023, the Global Express has been assembled at the Toronto Pearson International Airport in Mississauga, Ontario, and formerly at Downsview Airport in Toronto.

Since 2012, Japanese aerospace firm Mitsubishi Heavy Industries has built the wing and centre fuselage sections at its Toronto facility located east of the airport on Northwest Drive, and formerly at 2025 Meadowvale Boulevard from 2007 to 2012. Bombardier subsidiaries involved are Canadair as the design leader and nose manufacturer; Short Brothers in Belfast for the engine nacelles design and manufacture, horizontal stabiliser and forward fuselage; and de Havilland Canada for the rear fuselage, vertical tail and final assembly. The landing gear is produced by Dowty, flight controls by Sextant Avionique, the fuel system by Parker Bertea Aerospace, the core avionics by Honeywell, the APU by AlliedSignal, the electrical system by Lucas Aerospace, and the air management system by ABG-Semca.

In May 2015, production was reduced because of lower demand, caused by slowing economy and geopolitics in Latin America, Russia and China markets. By October 2018, Bombardier had a backlog of 202 aircraft valued at C$14.1 billion ($11 billion), including 128 Global Express aircraft: 67 Global 5000/6000 and four Global 5500/6500. The Global Express program cost $800 million.

== Design ==
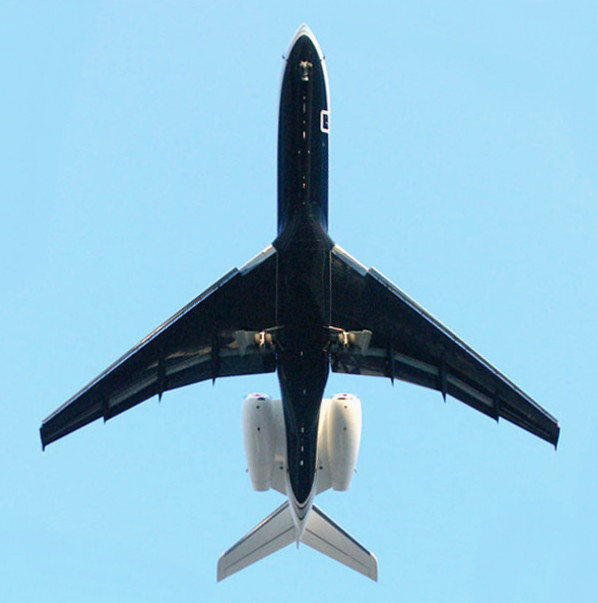
Planform view showing the 35° wing sweep

The Global Express is a high speed business/corporate aircraft with a range of 6,500 nmi (7,500 mi; 12,000 km) at Mach 0.80 (528 mph; 459 kn; 850 km/h), a 51,000 ft (16,000 m) service ceiling and a 14-hour endurance. The semi monocoque airframe is made of lightweight aluminum alloys and composite materials. It has a low wing, tricycle landing gear and fuselage-mounted engines.

The clean-sheet design draws upon the earlier Canadair CL-600 and Bombardier CRJ. It shares its fuselage cross-section with these aircraft, paired with a new T-tail and wing. The latter is a supercritical airfoil with a 35° wing sweep and winglets. This flexible wing naturally attenuates turbulence. It was initially powered by two BMW-Rolls-Royce BR710 turbofans controlled by FADEC. The flightdeck features a six screen Honeywell Primus 2000XP EFIS suite.

The Global Express was the business jet with the largest cabin, until being surpassed by the later Gulfstream G650. It can accommodate 12 to 16 passengers in three cabin sections: mostly a forward four-chair club section, a central four-seat conference grouping and an aft three-place divan facing two chairs. Most have a forward galley, crew rest chair and crew lavatory. The 10.3-psi cabin pressurization maintains a 4,500-ft. cabin altitude up to FL 450 and 5,680 ft. at the FL 510 ceiling. The cabin has an unobstructed length of 14.6 m (48 ft) while the floor is dropped by 51 mm (2.0 in) from the Challenger to increase width at shoulder level, while the windows have been repositioned and enlarged by 25%.

== Variants ==
=== Global 5000 ===
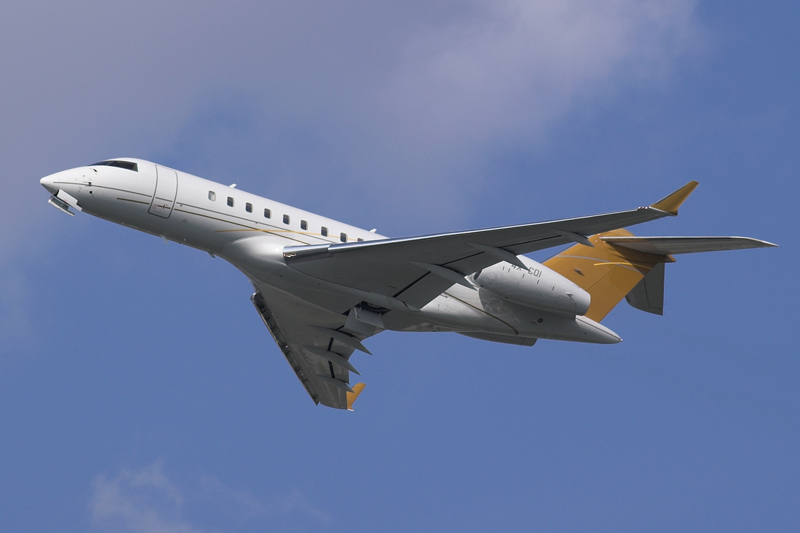
The G5000 is 0.8 m (31 in) shorter

The Global 5000 was announced in October 2001. It was launched in February 2002, with letters of intent for 15 aircraft with a 87,700 lb (39,800 kg) MTOW, and a 4,800 nmi (5,500 mi; 8,900 km) range at Mach 0.85. The first aircraft flew on 7 March 2003. It was introduced in April 2005. There were 224 in service in 2018. In April 2008, Bombardier lifted its MTOW to 92,500 lb (42,000 kg) to increase its Mach 0.85 range to 5,200 nmi (6,000 mi; 9,600 km).

Its cabin is 5.9 ft (1.8 m) shorter than the Global 6000 with a 5,800–7,000 lb (2,600–3,200 kg) lower MTOW depending on service bulletins. It has a 5,000–5,400 nmi (5,800–6,200 mi; 9,300–10,000 km) range at LRC. The spec basic operating weight is 50,350 lb (22,840 kg) but are actually closer to 51,600 lb (23,400 kg). Early models kept the Honeywell Primus 2000XP avionics, updated with the Bombardier Vision flight deck based on the Rockwell Collins Pro Line Fusion avionics since 2012.

It can carry between 8 and 19 passengers. The new seat converts to a full berth. There is an optional private room aft and the galley has room to prepare 16 five-course meals. It was priced at $40M in 2008. It has forward and aft lavatories. The crew rest area was removed, but could be restored. The tail fuel tank was removed and fuel is limited in the wings. Some avionics are rearranged to gain usable cabin length. The interior completions allowance is 3,200 kg.

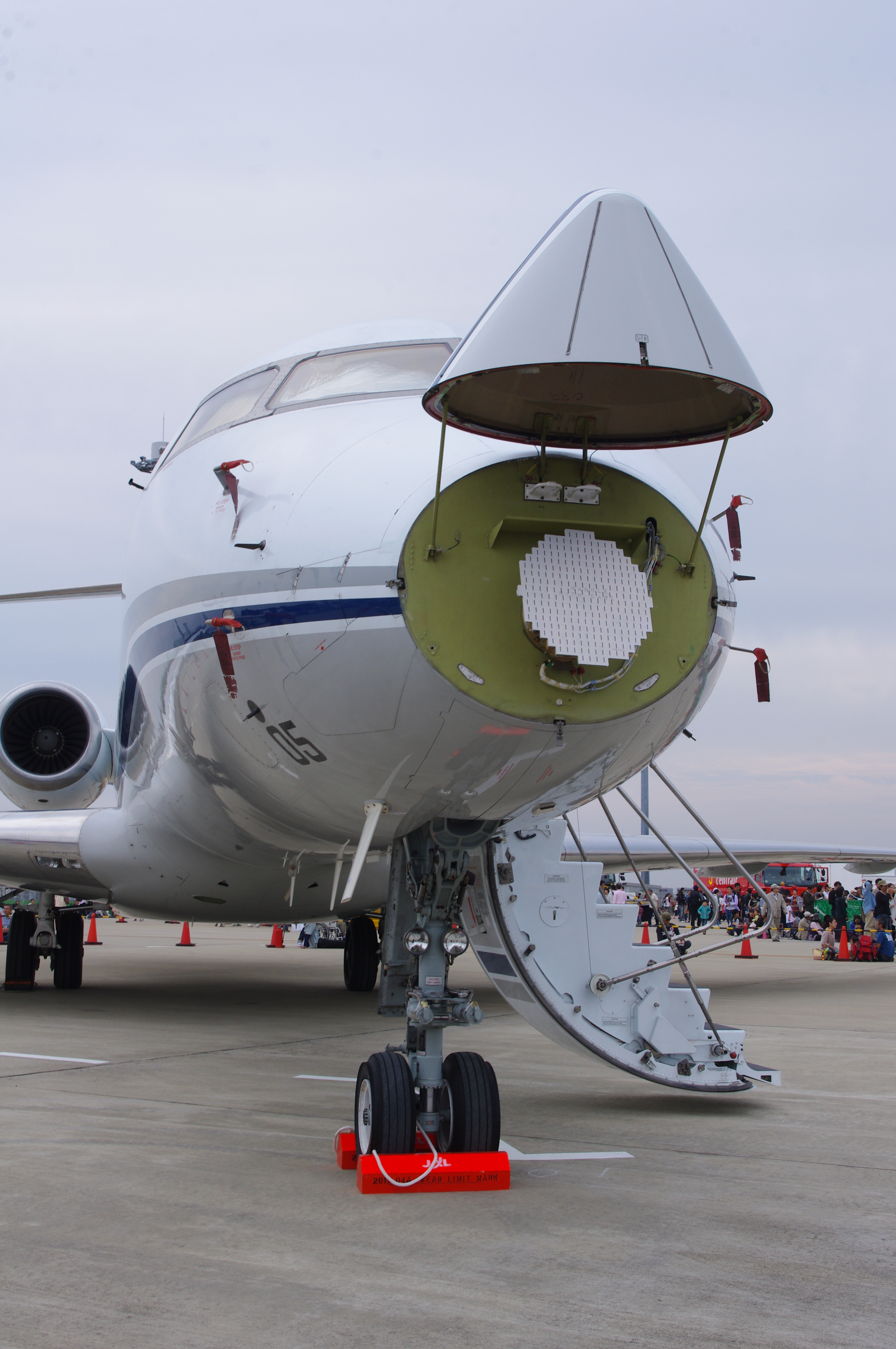
The G5000's weather radar

In 2018, its unit cost was US$50.44 million. At high-speed cruise, it burns 5,000 lb (2,300 kg) of fuel in the first hour, then 4,000 lb (1,800 kg) the second hour and 3,000 lb (1,400 kg) for the third hour. In 2018, Early models with Honeywell avionics were sold for $10–20 million, while post-2012 aircraft with the modern Cockpit can fetch $22–36 million. A major inspection every 180 months cost $800,000-1.2 million. Two 8,000h engine overhauls can cost $4 million. The cheaper and more efficient Gulfstream G450 or Falcon 900LX are slower, have less range and smaller cabins.

=== Global Express XRS ===
The improved Global Express XRS was announced on 6 October 2003 during the NBAA Convention at Orlando, Florida. It replaced the original Global Express and provides greater range at high speed, cabin upgrades, improved takeoff performance, fast fueling capability and the Bombardier Enhanced Vision System (BEVS) as standard equipment. A new forward fuel tank in the wing/body fairing increases the usable fuel capacity by up to 1,486 lbs, allowing it to fly 6,500 nm at Mach 0.82, 6,150 nm at Mach 0.85 or 5,450 nm at Mach 0.87. It provides improved pressurization with a 4,500 ft cabin altitude at 45,000 ft and a 5,700 ft cabin altitude at 51,000 ft; a 25% improvement on the previous Global cabin.

=== Global 6000 ===
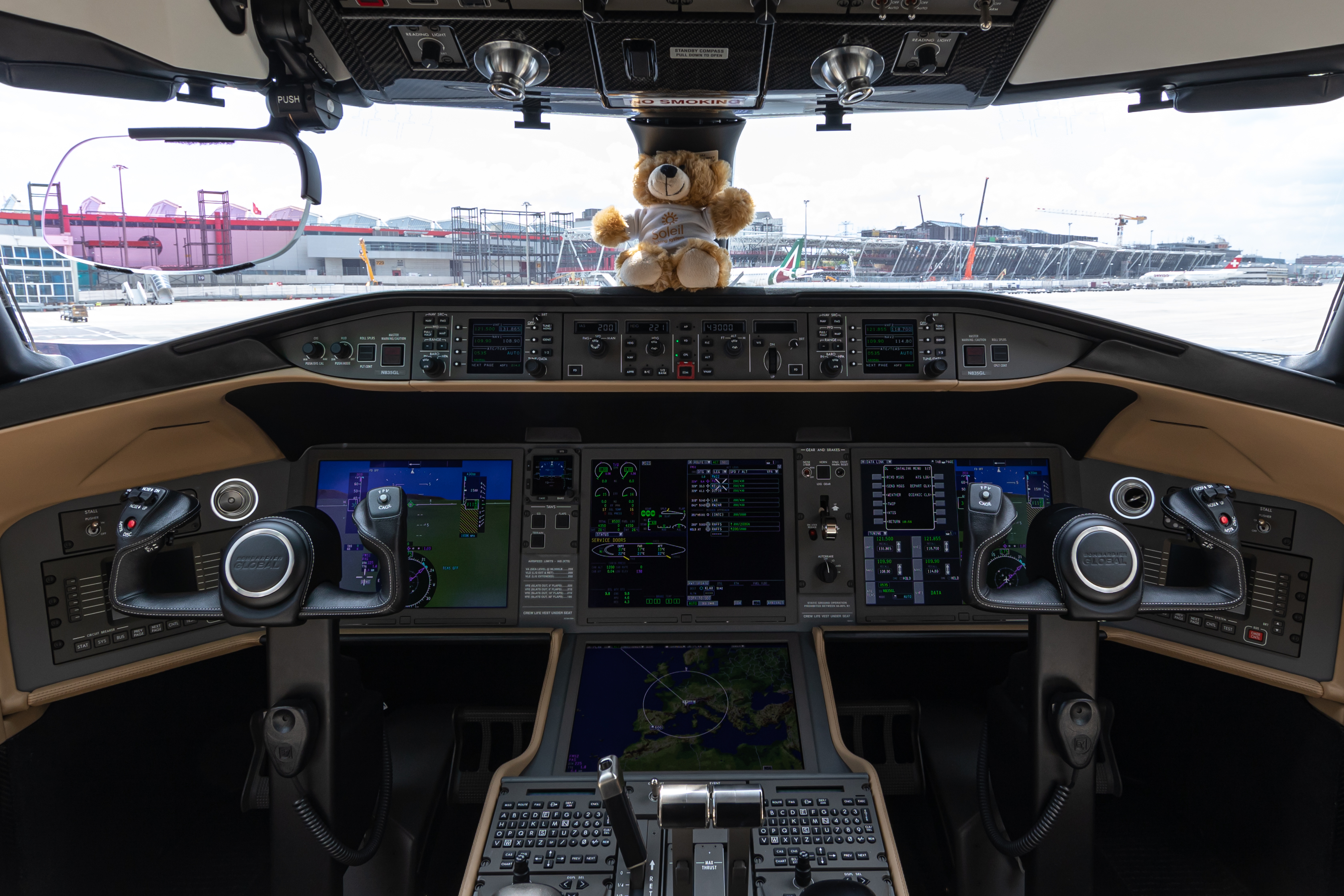
Updated flight deck of the Global 6000

Bombardier rebranded the Global Express XRS and upgraded the avionics from the Honeywell Primus 2000XP to the new Bombardier Vision flight deck, based on the Rockwell Collins Pro Line Fusion avionics suite, to create the Global 6000. The Global 6000 was announced in 2011 and production started in 2012. Its flexible wing and 97.5 lb/sq ft (476 kg/m^{2}) wing loading, the highest among its competitors, gives a comfortable ride in turbulence. It has improved acoustical insulation compared to its predecessor.

On long trips, its fuel burn is 5,000 lb (2.3 t) in the first hour, 4,000 lb (1.8 t) in the second hour, 3,000 lb (1.4 t) in the third hour and 2,500 lb (1.1 t) for every subsequent hour. A Checks are scheduled every 750 hours, and for C Checks every 30 months. Engine reserves amount to $260 per hour. Over 315 were delivered by March 2019. Its competitors include the 6,200 nmi (7,100 mi; 11,500 km) Dassault Falcon 8X, the 6,500 nmi (7,500 mi; 12,000 km) Gulfstream G600 or even the 6,900 nmi (7,900 mi; 12,800 km) G650.

In 2018, its unit cost was US$62.31 million.

=== Global 5500/6500 ===
In May 2018, Bombardier unveiled the Global 5500 and 6500. It was expected to enter service at the end of 2019. It has an optimized wing for a Mach 0.90 top speed, a revamped cabin inspired by the Global 7500 with its Nuage seat and updated Rolls-Royce BR710 Pearl engines with up to 13% lower fuel burn for better operating costs. It has better hot and high performance and 500 and 600 nmi (580 and 690 mi; 930 and 1,110 km) of additional range for 5,700 and 6,600 nmi (6,600 and 7,600 mi; 10,600 and 12,200 km), respectively. The engines have 9% more thrust.

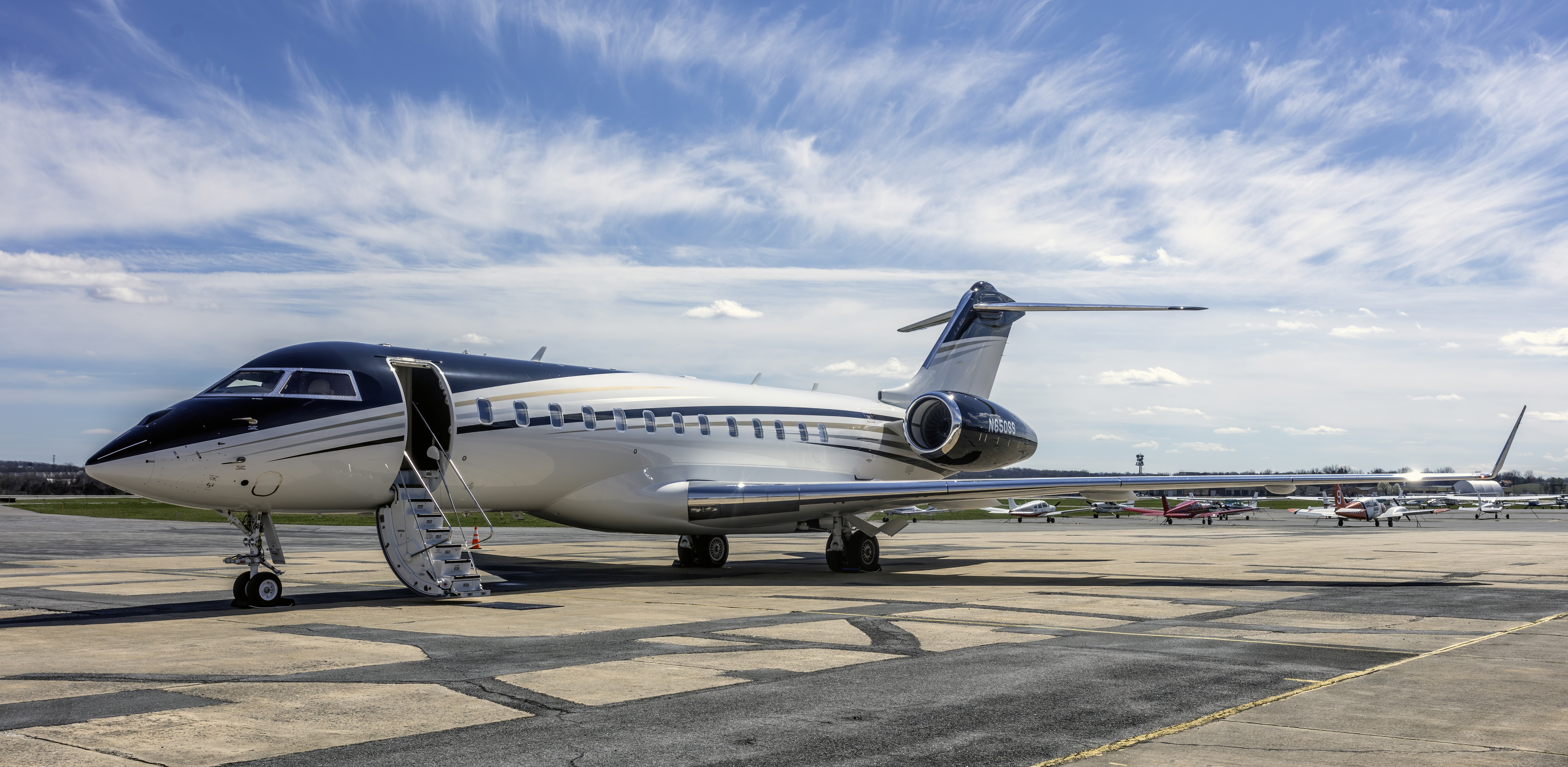
A Bombardier Global 6500

By October 2018, 70% of the flight testing hours were completed. The programme involved two flight-test Global 6500s, as the 5500 is a simple 0.8 m (2 ft 7 in) shrink. The redesigned wings are built by Mitsubishi Heavy Industries. By December, the flight-test program was nearly three-quarters complete. By May 2019, 90% of the flight testing was completed by two modified 6000s and one modified 5000.

In September 2019, Bombardier announced the Transport Canada Type Certification of both models, before entry-into-service later in 2019 and FAA/EASA approval. Bombardier announced the Global 6500 entry-into-service on 1 October. EASA Type Certification of both models was announced in October 2019. Shortly after, the Global 5500 range was extended by 200 nmi (230 mi; 370 km) to 5,900 nmi (6,800 mi; 10,900 km) at Mach 0.85.

FAA Type Certification of both variants was announced in December 2019. Bombardier announced the entry-into-service of the Global 5500 in June 2020. The first Global 5500 was delivered in July 2020, to " longtime Bombardier customer Unicorp National Developments, headquartered in Orlando, Florida."

In 2023, the Global 5500 costs $47.4 million, and the Global 6500 costs $58 million.

=== Military variants ===
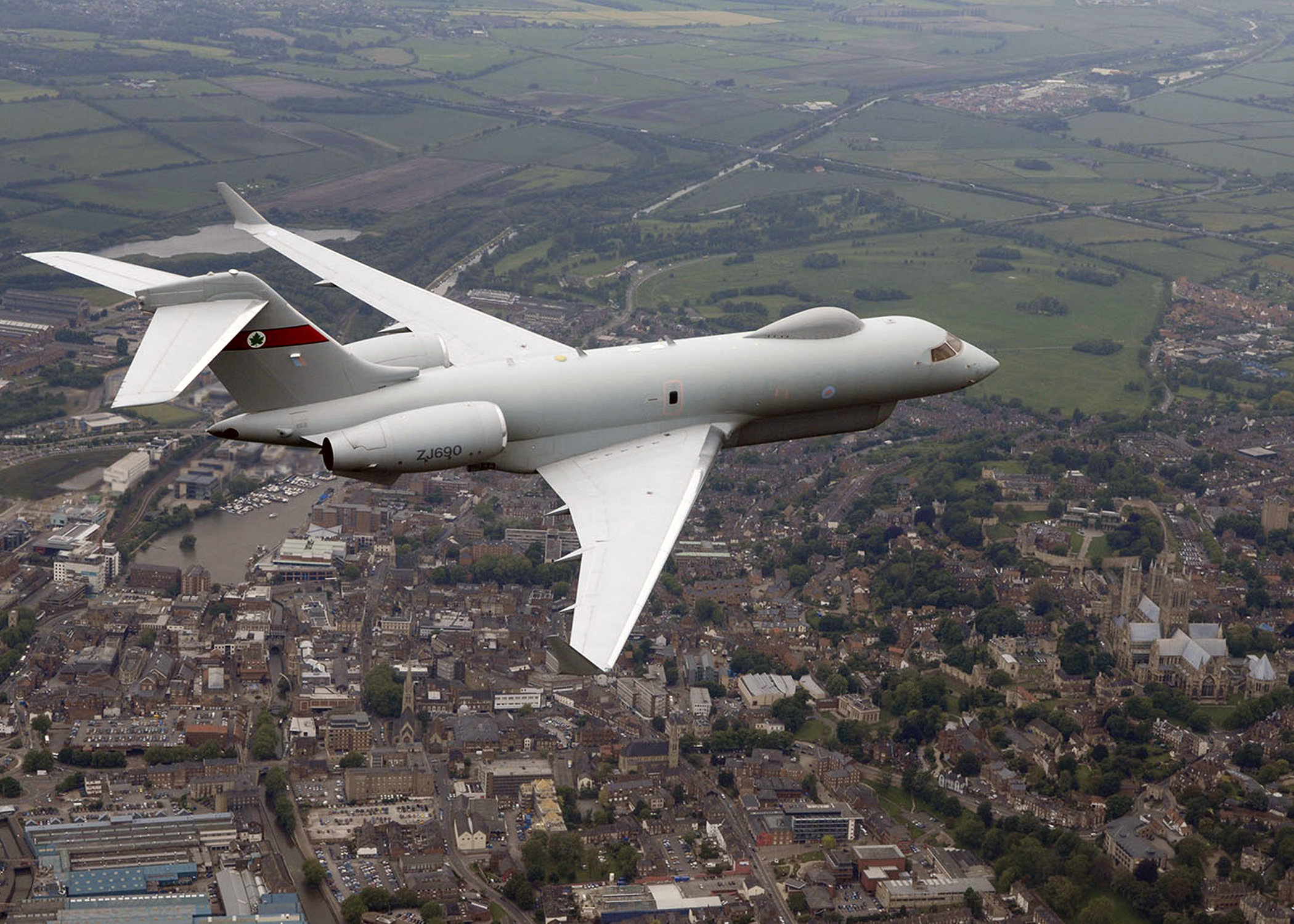
A RAF Raytheon Sentinel in flight

The Global Express has been modified for military missions.

- AEW&C aircraft:
  - GlobalEye multi-role AEW&C, a Global 6000 with the SAAB Erieye's ER AESA radar originally developed for the United Arab Emirates Air Force
  - Phoenix AEW&C, a Global 6500 with the Elta EL/W-2085 radar developed by L3Harris as a replacement for the E-3 Sentry used by European NATO countries. Selected by the South Korean Air Force in September 2025.
- Maritime patrol aircraft:
  - Saab Swordfish, a Swedish concept of a maritime patrol aircraft. No sales have been made.
  - Bombardier Defense and General Dynamics Mission Systems–Canada offered a multi-mission aircraft focused on maritime patrol. It was offered to Canada for that role, but was not selected.
  - Maritime MMA (Multi-Mission Aircraft), an aircraft designed in collaboration by Leonardo and Bombardier Defense unveiled in June 2025. This aircraft will be equipped with the Leonardo ATOS mission system.
  - PAL Aerospace P-6 maritime patrol aircraft - built on Global 6500 platform by PAL Aerospace and Bombardier Aviation but evolved from P-4 MPA based on the Q-400
- Surveillance aircraft:
  - Hensoldt Pegasus (SIGINT / reconnaissance): In January 2020, the German Federal Ministry of Defence chose the Global 6000 over the unmanned Northrop Grumman MQ-4C Triton for the “Persistent German Airborne Surveillance System” (PEGASUS) program, to better integrate in the air traffic control.
  - Project Dolphin (SIGINT): Conversion of Global 6000 by Marshall into surveillance aircraft for United Arab Emirates. Two converted.
  - Raytheon Sentinel is a ground surveillance / reconnaissance aircraft formerly used by the Royal Air Force.
  - DRDO ISTAR: The Centre for Airborne Systems of DRDO has selected Global 6500 variant for conversion into ISTAR platforms for the Indian Air Force. The programme is under development with three units expected to enter service.
  - In December 2023, the US Army awarded a firm-fixed-price contract for one Global 6500, with an option for two more, to be used as a High Accuracy Detection and Exploitation System (HADES) intelligence, surveillance and reconnaissance aircraft. In November 2024, the first plane was delivered. In March 2025, it was officially announced that the HADES was designated ME-11B.

A BD-700 has carried the High-Altitude Lidar Operational Experiment (HALOE) payload, deploying to Africa and Afghanistan to survey large areas rapidly.

- Communications and command aircraft:
  - E-11A, United States Air Force designation for Global aircraft being used as a platform for the Battlefield Airborne Communications Node.
- Electronic warfare aircraft:
  - In March 2019 Turkey's Presidency of Defense Industries, SSB, announced that four green Bombardier Global 6000s had been delivered to the facilities of Turkish Aerospace to undergo modification to the Hava SOJ (air stand-off jammer) configuration.
  - Korean Air will modify two 6500 jets for electronic warfare missions for the ROKAF

== Operators ==
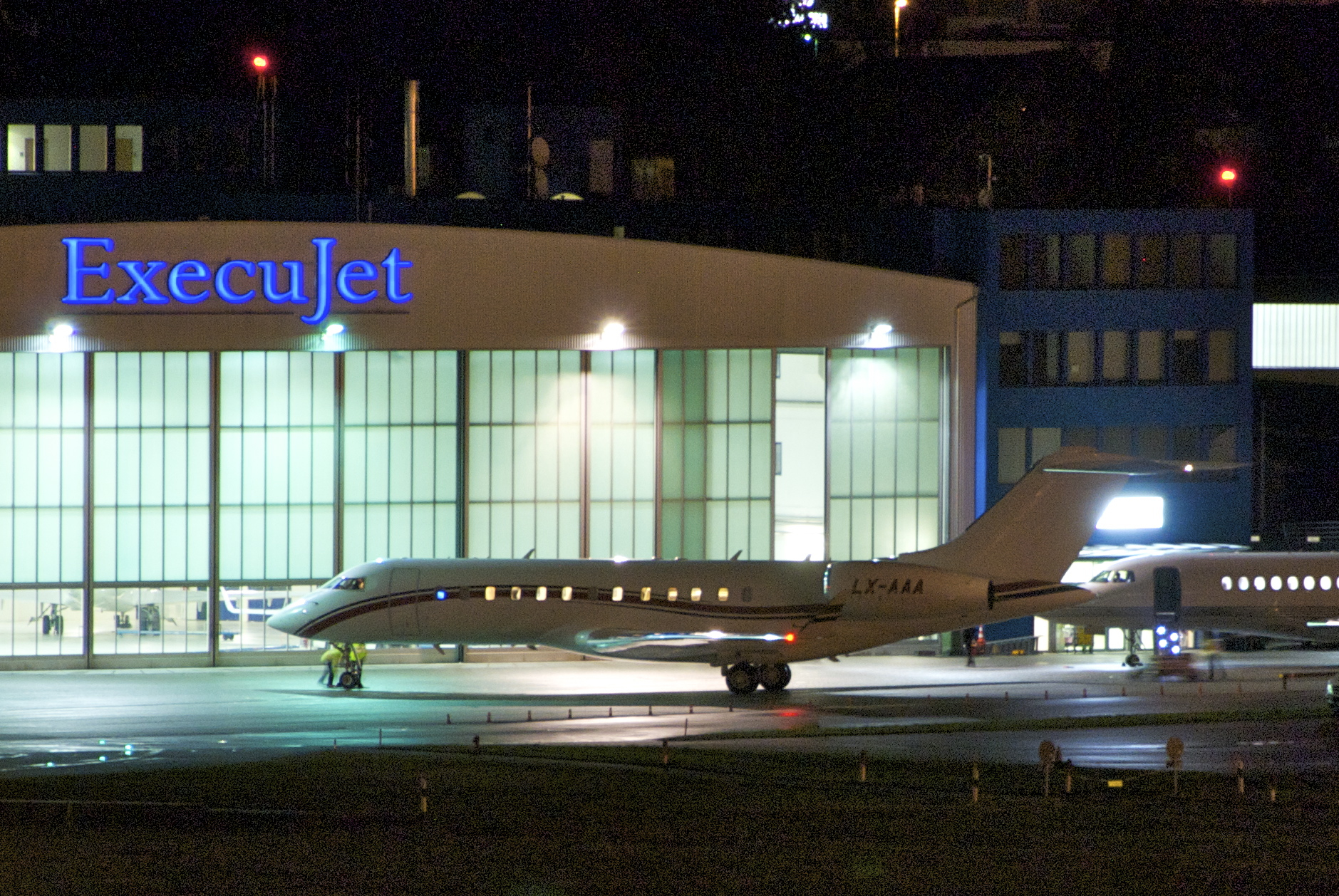
A Global Express at Zurich Airport

Most operators fly 450 to 600 hours per year. Fleet operators frequently fly more than 100 hours per month. By February 2015, over 600 aircraft accumulated more than 1.5 million flight hours and 570,000 cycles. In May 2018, 20 years after the type's introduction, more than 750 Globals were in service.

Half of the 6000s are registered in North America, mostly in the US. NetJets operates at least six and large corporations like Aetna, Caterpillar, CitiGroup, Limited Brands, McDonald's and Texas Instruments fly the aircraft. Malta-based VistaJet operates twenty eight 6000s, one Global XRS and has confirmed a delivery schedule of multiple Global 7500 throughout 2021. Lisbon-based NetJets Europe flies four 6000s.

A dozen 6000s are registered in the Isle of Man for anonymity, a few are registered in the Cayman Islands. Four are registered in Austria, three in Switzerland, two in France and Denmark, and one each in Finland, Germany, Ireland and Turkey. Three are registered in China, one in Malaysia and one in Hong Kong. Two are based in São Paulo, two are in South Africa and one is in India.

=== Civil ===
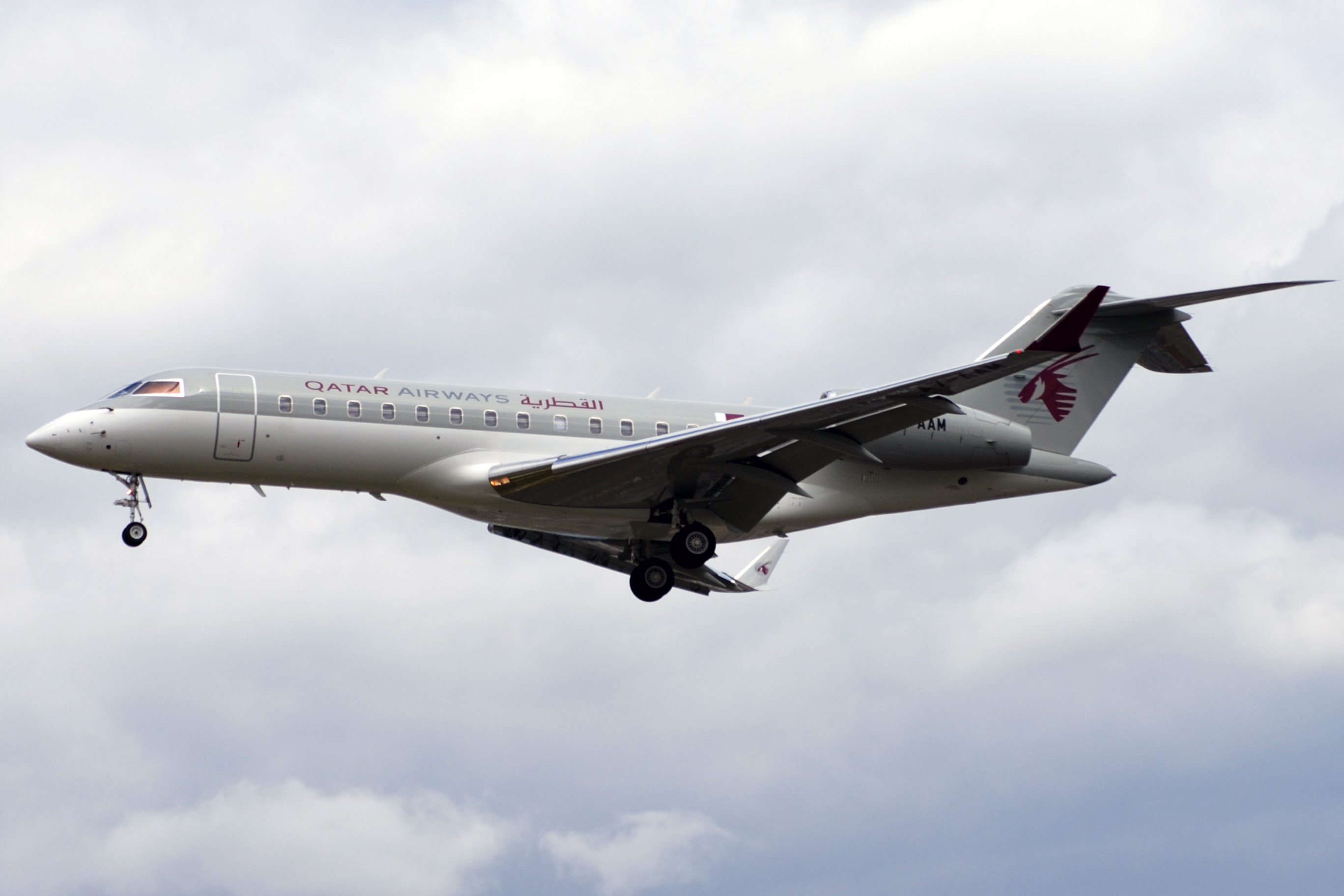
A Qatar Airways (Qatar Amiri Flight) Global Express

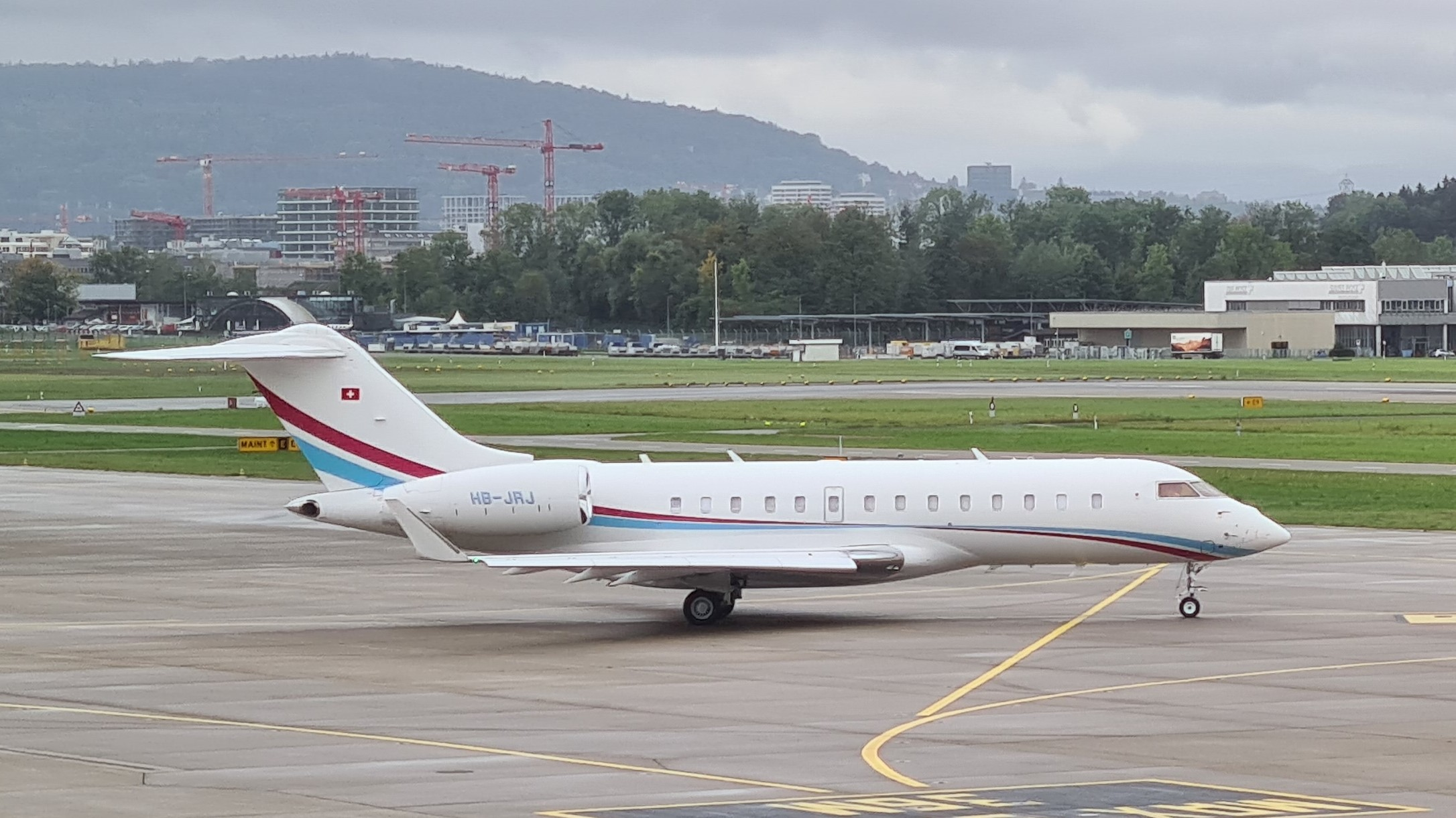
A Bombardier Global 5500

The aircraft is operated by private individuals, companies, executive charter operators and government agencies, including:

- ACM Air Charter, Baden-Baden
- Crystal Luxury Air
- AirAsia
- FedEx
- Flexjet
- ExecuJet Aviation Group, Zurich
- Netjets, a Berkshire Hathaway subsidiary
- Canonical CEO Mark Shuttleworth through HBD Venture Capital
- TAG Aviation, Switzerland
- Tiriac Air, Romania
- Qatar Executive, a business jet subsidiary of Qatar Airways
- VistaJet, Malta
- Jet Story, Poland
- Seven Aviation, Bahrain

=== Military ===
==== Transport ====
Angola
- 1 Global 5000 VIP, operated by the Angolan armed forces
Botswana
- 1 Global 6000 VIP, operated by the Botswana Air Force
Canada
- 6 Global 6500 to be delivered starting in 2027. Will be used for VIP transport, utility flights and support missions such as aeromedical evacuations, disaster relief, humanitarian aid and national security operations.
Germany
- 3 Global 5000 for VIP transport operated by the Special Air Mission Wing MoD in Cologne
- 3 Global 6000 for VIP transport delivered in late 2019.
Malaysia
- 1 Global 6000 VIP, operated by the Royal Malaysian Air Force, assigned to the 2nd Squadron of the 1st Division of the Air Force and is stationed at Kuala Lumpur-Sultan Abdul Aziz Shah Airport.
Mexico
- 1 Global jet ordered for the Mexican Air Force

Pakistan

- 1 Global 5000 VIP, operated by the Pakistan Army
Sweden
- 2 Global 6500 for VIP transport operated by the Swedish Air Force.

==== Military mission ====
Germany
- 3 Global 6500, known as Pegasus (Persistent German Airborne Surveillance System), for SIGINT missions ordered in 2021, first flown in October 2024, to enter service by 2025 and replace the Eurohawk
India
- 2 Global 5000 SIGINT aircraft made by Elta, stationed at the Palam Air Force Station in Delhi
Pakistan
- 1 Global 6000 ordered to be converted to EW, ESM, ECM platform as a successor to the DA-20 Falcon, and to be operated by the Pakistani Air Force
South Korea
- In September 2025, South Korea selected L3Harris to deliver 4 Global 6500-based Phoenix AEW&C aircraft fitted with the EL/W-2085 radar by Elta.
Sweden
- 3 Global 6000 for the GlobalEye AEW&C on order + 1 on option, to be delivered by 2027
Turkey
- 4 Global 6000 to be transformed into Electronic warfare / jamming platforms for the Turkish Air Force, received in March 2019
UAE
- 5 Global 6000 for the GlobalEye AEW&C ordered in 2 tranches
- 2 Project Dolphin ELINT aircraft
United States
US Air Force
- 7 Global 6000 in service + 4 on order, known as E-11A, used as command and control / battlefield airborne communication node
US Army
- Global 6500 SIGINT / ELINT, known as ME-11B, successor of the RC-12 Guardrail
  - 1 Global 6500 demonstrator ARES flew in Europe for missions in order to try out the technologies prior to the development of the HADES final variant.
- The 2026 WORLD AIR FORCES lists the following aircraft for the US Army:
  - Global 6500 (Ares) (EW) - 1 active
  - Global 6500 (Athena R) (Recce) - 2 active
  - Global 6500 (Athena S) (SIGINT) - 2 on order
  - Global 6500 (Hades) (ELINT) - 3+3* on order

=== Former operators ===
United Kingdom

- Royal Air Force (June 2007 – March 2021)
  - No. 5 Squadron RAF - 5 (Bombardier airframe modified as Raytheon Sentinel R1 by Raytheon)

== Specifications ==
| Model | Global 5000 | Global 5500 | Global 6000 | Global 6500 |
|---|---|---|---|---|
| Cockpit crew | Two | | | |
| Passengers | 16 | 16 | 17 | 17 |
| Length | 96 ft 10 in (29.51 m) | | 99 ft 5 in (30.30 m) | |
| Wing | 94 ft (29 m) span, 1,021 ft^{2} (94.9 m^{2}) area, 8.7 AR | | | |
| Height | 25 ft 6 in (7.77 m) | | | |
| Cabin length | 40 ft 9 in (12.42 m) | | 43 ft 3 in (13.18 m) | |
| Cabin section | 7 ft 11 in (2.41 m) max width, 6 ft 6 in (1.98 m) floor width, 6 ft 2 in (1.88 m) height | | | |
| Max. takeoff weight | 92,500 lb (42,000 kg) | | 99,500 lb (45,100 kg) | |
| Operating empty weight | 50,861 lb (23,070 kg) | | 52,230 lb (23,690 kg) | |
| Max. fuel | 39,250 lb (17,800 kg) | | 45,050 lb (20,430 kg) | |
| Max. payload | 7,139 lb (3,238 kg) | | 5,770 lb (2,620 kg) | |
| Engines | BR700-710A2-20 | BR700-710D5-21 | BR700-710A2-20 | BR700-710D5-21 |
| Thrust | 14,750 lbf (65.6 kN) | 15,125 lbf (67.28 kN) | 14,750 lbf (65.6 kN) | 15,125 lbf (67.28 kN) |
| Top speed | Mach 0.89 | Mach 0.90 | Mach 0.89 | Mach 0.90 |
| Cruise | Mach 0.88 - 504 kn (933 km/h; 580 mph) high-speed, Mach 0.85 - 487 kn (902 km/h; 560 mph) typical | | | |
| Range (Note: NBAA IFR Reserves, ISA, 8 pax, at Mach 0.85) | 5,200 nmi (9,630 km; 5,984 mi) | 5,900 nmi (10,927 km; 6,790 mi) | 6,000 nmi (11,112 km; 6,905 mi) | 6,600 nmi (12,223 km; 7,595 mi) |
| Takeoff distance (Note: SL, ISA, MTOW) | 5,540 ft (1,690 m) | 5,340 ft (1,630 m) | 6,476 ft (1,974 m) | 6,145 ft (1,873 m) |
| Landing distance (Note: SL, ISA, MLW) | 2,207 ft (673 m) | | 2,236 ft (682 m) | |
| Ceiling | 51,000 ft (16,000 m) max., 41,000 ft (12,000 m) initial cruise at MTOW | | | |

== Accidents and incidents ==
As of 27 January 2020, six Global Express have been damaged beyond repair in hull-loss incidents.

| Date | Model | Operator | Location | Fatalities | Incident |
|---|---|---|---|---|---|
| 11 November 2007 | Global 5000 | Jetport Inc. | Canada, Nova Scotia, Fox Harbour Airport | 0/10 | Landed short of the runway, collided with embankments, landing gear collapsed, skidded across the runway on its belly and coming to rest in a field. |
| 17 January 2015 | Global 5000 | Challenger Aero Corporation Metro Manila | Philippines, Tacloban Airport | 0/16 | Severely damaged after exiting to the left of the runway at high speed. |
| 16 April 2019 | Global 5000 | German Air Force | Germany, Berlin Schönefeld Airport | 0 | Severely damaged in a forced landing after flight control problems due to improper maintenance. |
| 27 January 2020 | Northrop Grumman E-11A | United States Air Force | Afghanistan, Ghazni Province, Dih Yak District | 2/2 | 2020 United States Air Force E-11A crash in a Taliban-controlled area. After experiencing a failure of the left engine, the crew shut down the operable right engine leading to a dual engine out emergency. The crew announced to Kabul ATC that they had lost both engines and that they intended to proceed to Kandahar, which was well outside the E-11A glide capabilities. This intent suggests that the crew was confident of airstarting one or both engines. There is no DFDR data to definitively confirm whether an attempt to airstart the right engine was made. With the crew unable to get either engine airstarted, the aircraft was unable to glide the remaining distance to Kandahar. With few options remaining, the crew maneuvered the aircraft towards Forward Operating Base (FOB) Sharana, but did not have the altitude and airspeed to glide the remaining distance. The crew unsuccessfully attempted landing in a field approximately 21 NM short of FOB Sharana. Performance data indicates, and simulation confirms, that for approximately three to five minutes after the initial event, the crew could have glided to and landed at Bagram or Kabul airports, respectively. |

== See also ==
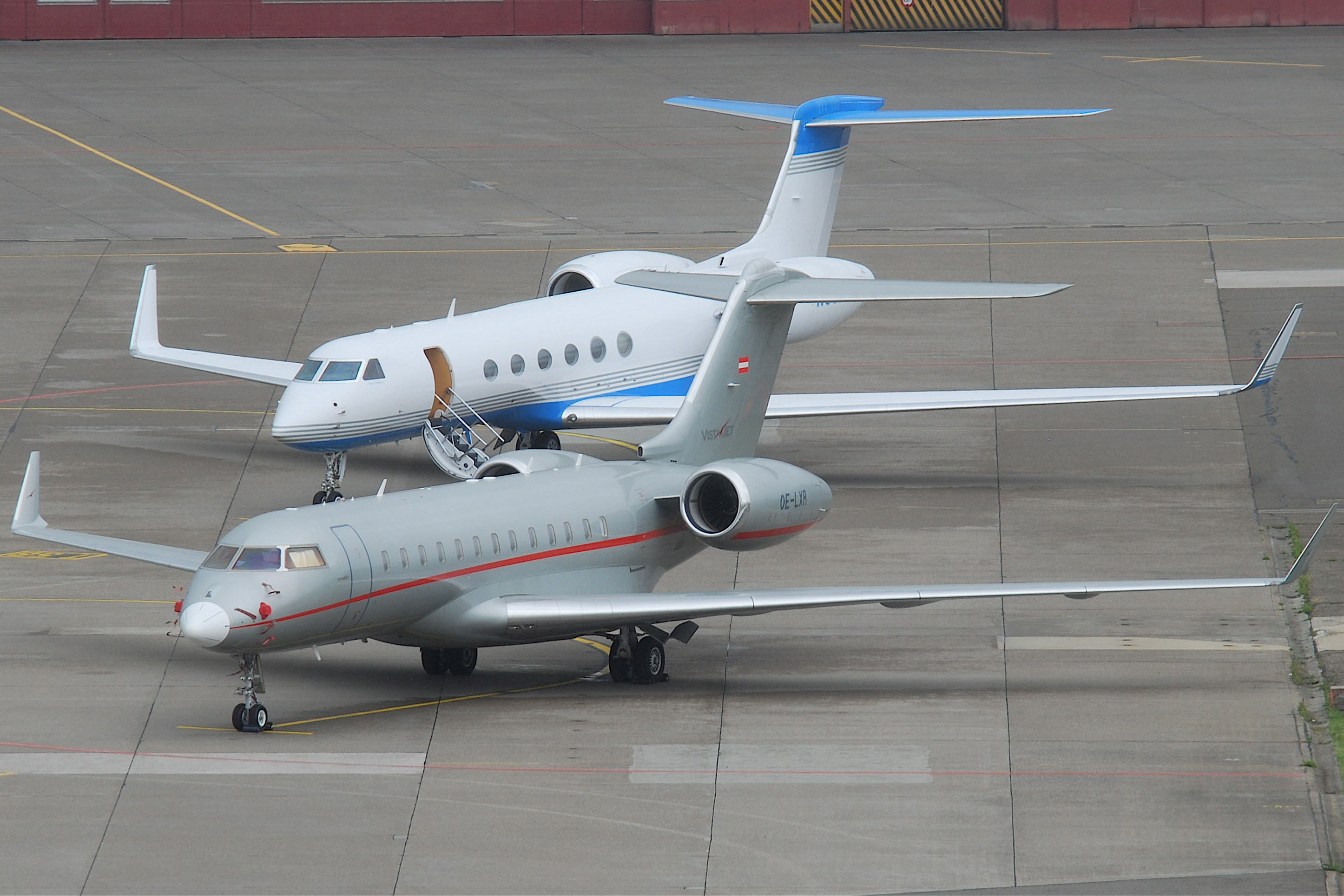
A Global Express XRS with a Gulfstream V behind

Related development

- Saab GlobalEye
- Raytheon Sentinel
- Bombardier Global 7500/8000

Aircraft of comparable role, configuration, and era

- Gulfstream V
- Gulfstream 550
- Gulfstream G500/G600
- Dassault Falcon 7X
- Embraer Lineage 1000

Related lists

- List of civil aircraft
