= Rolls-Royce Deutschland =

German subsidiary of Rolls-Royce plc

- Company type: Subsidiary
- Industry: Aeronautics
- Founded: 1990; 35 years ago
- Headquarters: Dahlewitz, Germany
- Products: Aircraft engines
- Parent: Rolls-Royce Holdings
- Website: rolls-royce.com/deutschland

Rolls-Royce Deutschland is a subsidiary of British aircraft engine maker Rolls-Royce plc. Its primarily facilities are located at Dahlewitz outside Berlin near Berlin Brandenburg Airport and Motorenfabrik Oberursel at Oberursel near Frankfurt am Main.

The company was formerly known as BMW Rolls-Royce (BRR), being initially operated as a joint venture company between the German car manufacturer BMW and Rolls-Royce. The joint venture took control of the existing aviation engine business of Klöckner-Humboldt-Deutz. Early work involved the development and production of the BR700 family of jet engines, launched in 1992. During 1999, it was announced that BMW was to discontinue direct involvement in the venture, leading to Rolls-Royce assuming full control in the following year and to the business being renamed Rolls-Royce Deutschland. It has since become the hub for Rolls-Royce Group's two-shaft engines, including the Tay, Spey and IAE V2500, along with the Dart turboprop engine.

== History ==
The company was established during 1990 as a joint venture, originally known as BMW Rolls-Royce, between the German car manufacturer BMW and British aircraft engine maker Rolls-Royce plc. The establishment of this venture marked the return of BMW to aero engine manufacturing after the firm had suspended its activities in the sector in the immediate aftermath of the Second World War. The joint venture bought the aviation engine business KHD Luftfahrttechnik GmbH, previously known as Klöckner-Humboldt-Deutz. This business began building aviation engines in 1913 as Motorenfabrik Oberursel.

The initial purpose of the venture was to develop and manufacture the BR700 family of jet engines. During 1992, development of this powerplant following a sizable order for 200 engines was secured from its launch customer, Gulfstream Aerospace. It was subsequently adopted on multiple aircraft, such as the Boeing 717 airliner, as well as the Bombardier Global Express and the Gulfstream G550 business jets.

In 1999, it was announced that BMW was seeking to reduce its direct involvement in BMW Rolls-Royce. During the following year, Rolls-Royce took full control of the joint venture, leading to it being renamed Rolls-Royce Deutschland. BMW maintained a significant stake in parent company Rolls-Royce Plc, being the single largest shareholder in the firm for a number of years. However, BMW opted to sell its remaining shares during 2006, the move representing the company's formal exit for the aero engine sector after roughly 90 years of involvement.

Shortly after its rebranding as Rolls-Royce Deutschland, the company was assigned all responsibility for several of Rolls-Royce's two-shaft turbofan engines, including the Tay, Spey and IAE V2500, along with the Dart turboprop engine, from the parent company. This redistribution of the work was part of a long-term strategy, allowing the company's main facility at Derby to concentrate on the production and development of its three shaft turbofan powerplants, while Rolls-Royce Deutschland's Dahlewitz facility is developed into a “centre of excellence” for all two-shaft engines within the group.

Around the time of the take-over, the Rolls-Royce Group was reportedly studying development of a new two-shaft family of engines, ranging from the 7,000 lb-thrust (31 kN) class up to 22,000 lb thrust, to eventually replacement its BR700, Tay and smaller AE 3700 turbofan product lines. This was intended to compete for the next generation of corporate aircraft, regional jets, and small airliners. By 2008, Rolls-Royce was yet to initiate a specific programme; instead, it was reportedly conducting market research via consultations with airlines on their requirements for a future prospective powerplant.

During the 2000s, the subsidiary became involved in the production of the Europrop TP400, the largest turboprop engine developed in Europe, to power the Airbus A400M Atlas, a military transport plane.

By 2005, the larger BR715 model of the BR700 family was being phased out as the only aircraft to have been powered by it, the Boeing 717, was being discontinued due to poor sales. However, the smaller BR710 continues to be produced for the Bombardier Global Express and Gulfstream G550 business jets. Furthermore, other operators were interested in adopting the BR710; China Aviation Industry Corporation I and Rolls-Royce Deutschland were at one point studying its potential use to power China's upcoming regional jet, the Comac ARJ21. Development of the improved BR725, which had been selected to power the Gulfstream G650 business jet, was undertaken during the later half of the decade.
