= Mark Brandis =

German writer and journalist

Nikolai von Michalewsky (a.k.a. Mark Brandis) (January 17, 1931 – December 27, 2000) was a German writer and journalist best known for a series of science fiction novels published between 1970 and 1987.

== Biography ==
Von Michalewsky was born in Dahlewitz, a town on the outskirts of Berlin. After having earned his living as a dock worker, a coffee harvester in the Congo, and a diver in the Mediterranean, he worked as a journalist in the Algerian war, eventually to start writing fictional works in the late 1950s, mostly juvenile novels. He expanded his field to documentary filming and writing of radio drama in the 1960s, an expertise he became very successful at. At the end of his life he would have more than 500 broadcast radio dramas to his name. In 1969 he was approached by German book publisher Herder to write a science fiction book for juveniles. Despite having no previous experience in the field of science fiction, von Michalewsky's first book in the genre, Bordbuch Delta VII, was an instant success.

Using the name of his protagonist as pen name and writing in first person perspective, von Michalewsky would pen approximately two books a year over the following decades to eventually complete a series of 31 novels. The series became the second best-selling German-language science fiction series of all time, eclipsed only by team effort Perry Rhodan. The books were translated into Danish, Dutch, French, Italian, Spanish and Chinese. A late attempt to revive the series in 1999 was limited to one novel, Ambivalente Zone. This expanded universe series was cut short when von Michalewsky died at Grasberg shortly after Christmas 2000, leaving the second novel, Negativer Sektor, unfinished.

=== Mark Brandis series ===
The Mark Brandis series can be categorized as hard science fiction space opera with many allusions to seafaring novels. Mankind has been exploring the Solar System, setting up colonies on the Moon and Venus. Earth is controlled by two superpowers, the Union of Europe, the Americas and Africa ("EAAU") opposing the United Oriental Republics ("VOR", that is Asia). The respective capitals are Beijing and an artificial Atlantic city named Metropolis. Mark Brandis, a German-born astronaut, works as a test pilot for a nominally independent EAAU institution, the Venus-Earth Astronautical Society (VEGA). His work with the newest and therefore fastest and strongest spaceships often puts him and the international crews of his ships into danger, be it revolutions, ecological catastrophes, overpopulation issues, space exploration, equipment malfunctions and civil war.

After volume 20, Brandis quits his job to run an independent society dedicated to rescue ship crews suffering emergencies in space Operating a number of modern high-speed space rescue ships from an extraterritorial Moon base, the society rescues numerous space crews and plays an important role in various adventures not too dissimilar in style to the VEGA adventures. As in the early novels, political diplomacy and difficult ethical choices play an important role, as well as the constant fighting to keep the space rescue service in operation on a tight budget and in spite of warring factions and interests.

The ships of the rescue service are named after people famous for their humanitarian efforts, such as Elsa Brändström, Florence Nightingale, Henri Dunant, Albert Schweitzer, Mahatma Gandhi and Rabindranath Tagore.

==== The novels ====
1. Bordbuch Delta VII (1970)
2. Verrat auf der Venus (1971)
3. Unternehmen Delphin (1972)
4. Aufstand der Roboter (1972)
5. Vorstoß zum Uranus (1972)
6. Die Vollstrecker (1973)
7. Testakte Kolibri (1973)
8. Raumsonde Epsilon (1974)
9. Salomon 76 (1974)
10. Aktenzeichen: Illegal (1975)
11. Operation Sonnenfracht (1975)
12. Alarm für die Erde (1976)
13. Countdown für die Erde (1976)
14. Kurier zum Mars (1977)
15. Die lautlose Bombe (1977)
16. Pilgrim 2000 (1978)
17. Der Spiegelplanet (1978)
18. Sirius-Patrouille (1979)
19. Astropolis (1980)
20. Triton-Passage (1981)
21. Blindflug zur Schlange (1981)
22. Raumposition Oberon (1982)
23. Vargo-Faktor (1982)
24. Astronautensonne (1983)
25. Planetaktion Z (1983)
26. Ikarus, Ikarus... (1984)
27. Der Pandora-Zwischenfall (1984)
28. Metropolis-Konvoi (1985)
29. Zeitspule (1985)
30. Die Eismensch-Verschwörung (1986)
31. Geheimsache Wetterhahn (1987)
- Ambivalente Zone (1999)

==== Audio dramas ====
Between 2007 and 2015 a total of 23 adventures of the Mark Brandis series had been adapted into audio drama format and published on CD.

1. Bordbuch Delta VII (2007) (ISBN 978-3-88698-918-8)
2. Verrat auf der Venus (2008) (ISBN 978-3-88698-773-3)
3. Unternehmen Delphin (2008) (ISBN 978-3-88698-939-3)
4. Aufstand der Roboter (2009) (ISBN 978-3-88698-436-7)
5. Testakte Kolibri 1 & 2 (2009) (ISBN 978-3-8291-2314-3 / ISBN 978-3-8291-2313-6)
6. Vorstoss zum Uranus 1 & 2 (2010) (ISBN 978-3-8291-2315-0 / ISBN 978-3-8291-2316-7)
7. Raumsonde Epsilon 1 & 2 (2010) (ISBN 978-3-8291-2317-4 / ISBN 978-3-8291-2318-1)
8. Die Vollstrecker 1 & 2 (2010) (ISBN 978-3-8291-2376-1 / ISBN 978-3-8291-2377-8)
9. Pilgrim 2000 1 & 2 (2011) (ISBN 978-3-8291-2436-2 / ISBN 978-3-8291-2437-9)
10. Aktenzeichen: illegal (2011) (ISBN 978-3-8291-2438-6)
11. Operation Sonnenfracht (2011) (ISBN 978-3-8291-2439-3)
12. Alarm für die Erde 1 & 2 (2011)
13. Sirius-Patrouille 1 & 2 (2012)
14. Lautlose Bombe 1 & 2 (2012)
15. Triton-Passage (2013)
16. Blindflug zur Schlange (2013)
17. Raumposition Oberon (2013)
18. Ikarus, Ikarus (2013)
19. Metropolis-Konvoi (2014)
20. Die Zeitspule 1 & 2 (2014)
21. Planetaktion Z (2014)
22. Geheimsache Wetterhahn (2015)
23. Der Pandora-Zwischenfall (2015)
