= Rolls-Royce BR700 =

Turbofan aircraft engine

BR700 series
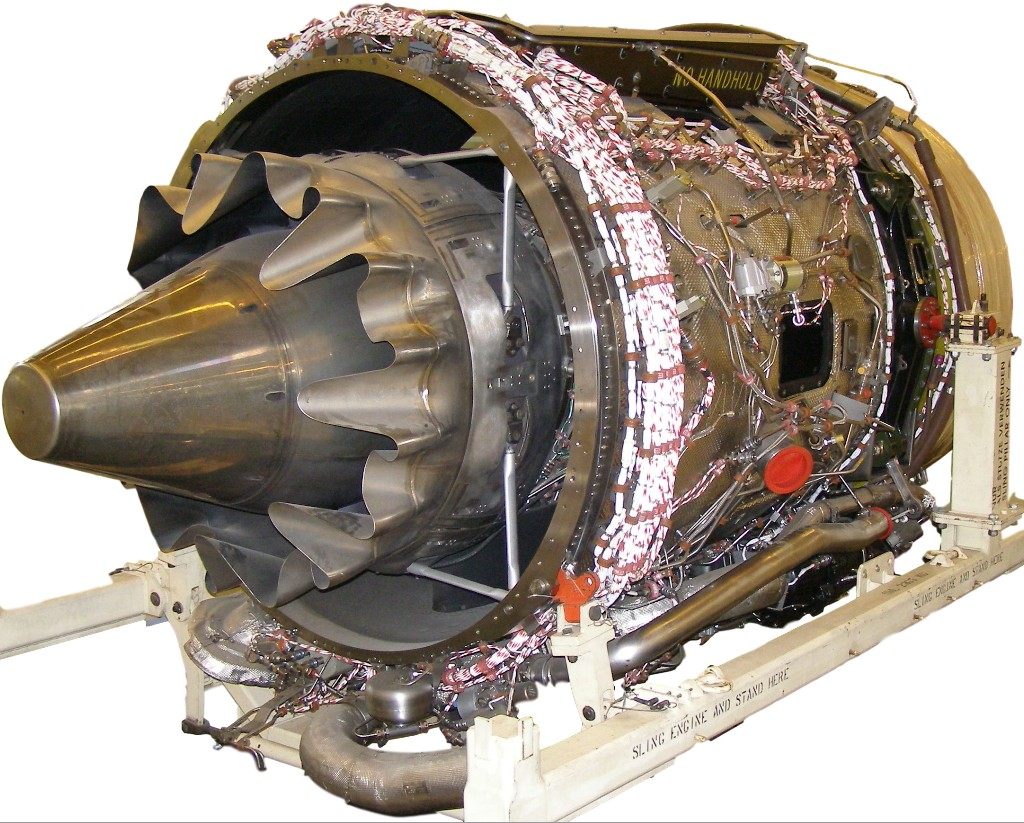
- Rear view of a BR710
- Type: Turbofan
- National origin: Germany
- Manufacturer: Rolls-Royce Deutschland
- First run: 1995
- Major applications: Bombardier Global Express; Boeing 717; Gulfstream V
- Number built: 3,600+

The Rolls-Royce BR700, with latest variants being marketed as the Rolls-Royce Pearl, is a family of turbofan engines for regional jets and corporate jets. It is manufactured in Dahlewitz, Germany, by Rolls-Royce Deutschland: this was initially a joint venture of BMW and Rolls-Royce plc established in 1990 to develop this engine. The original BR710 first ran in 1995. The BR725 variant is used by the United States military under the designation F130 and manufactured in the United States by Rolls-Royce North America.

== Design and development ==
=== Original series ===
==== BR710 ====
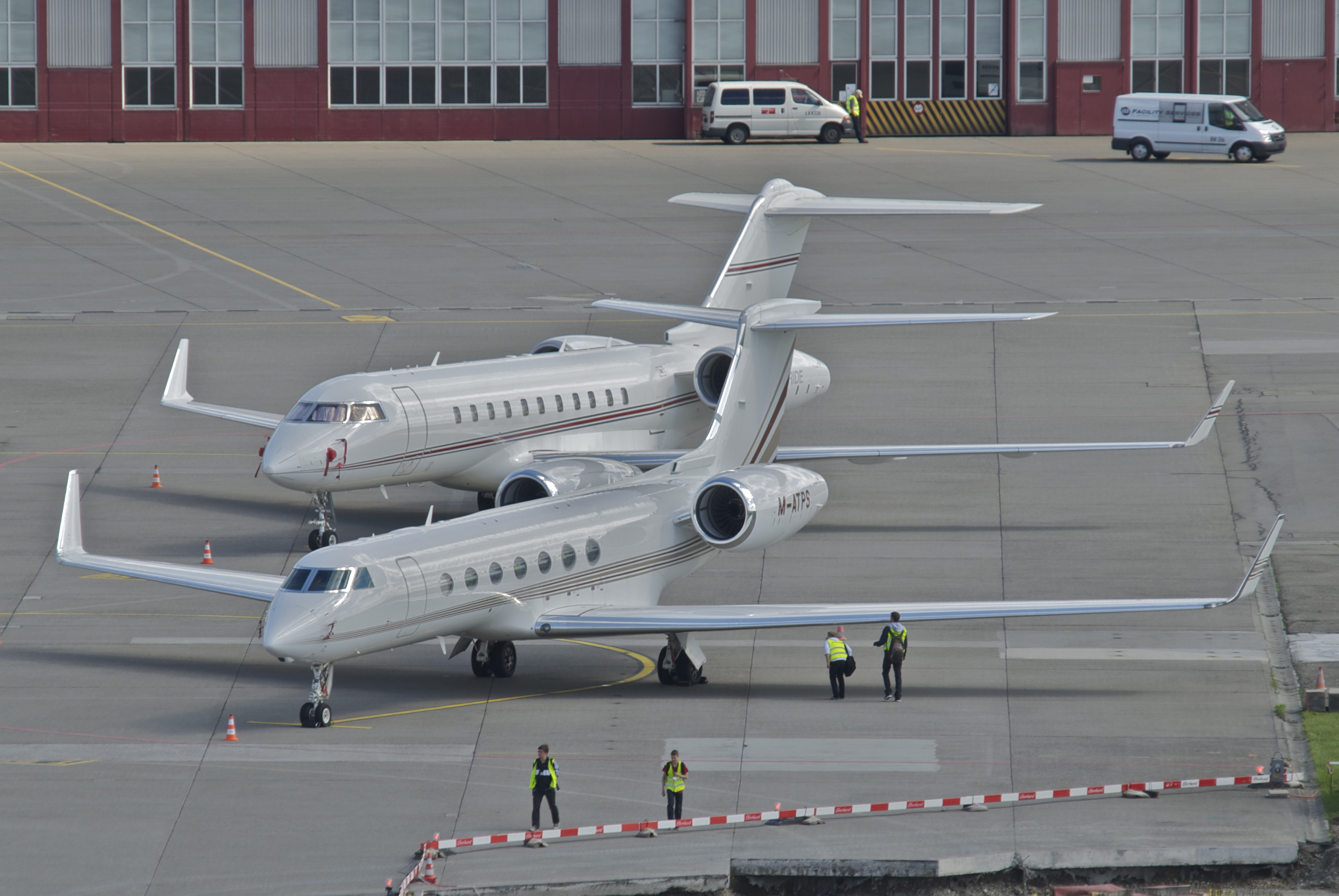
A G550 in front of a Bombardier Global Express: the BR710 main applications

The BR710 (BR700-710A/C) is a twin shaft turbofan, and entered service on the Gulfstream V in 1997 and the Bombardier Global Express in 1998. This version has also been selected to power the Gulfstream G550.

The BR710 comprises a 48 in (120 cm) diameter single-stage fan, driven by a two-stage LP turbine, and a ten-stage HP compressor (scaled from the V2500 unit) driven by a two-stage, air-cooled, HP turbine.

This engine has a thrust-specific fuel consumption (TSFC) of 0.39 lb/(lbf⋅h) (11 g/(kN⋅s)) at static sea level takeoff and 0.64 lb/(lbf⋅h) (18 g/(kN⋅s)) at a cruise speed of Mach 0.8 and altitude of 35,000 ft (10,668 m).

In May 2017, the 3,200 engines in service reached 10 million flying hours.

==== BR715 ====
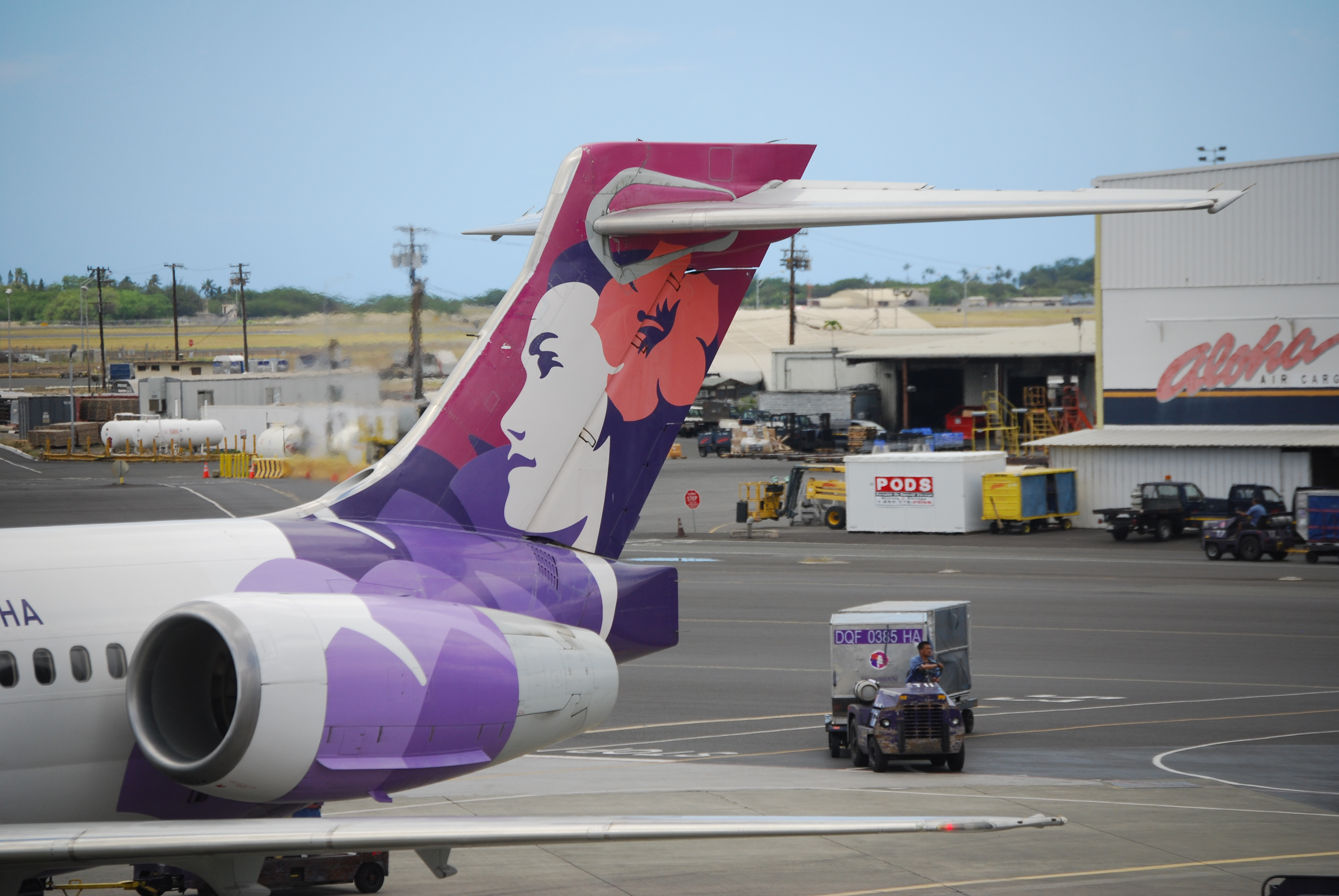
A BR715 engine on a Hawaiian Boeing 717

The BR715 (BR700-715) is another twin-shaft turbofan; this engine was first run in April 1997 and entered service in mid-1999. This version powers the Boeing 717.

A new LP spool, comprising a 58 in (150 cm) diameter single-stage fan, with two-stage LP compressor driven by a three-stage LP turbine, is incorporated into the BR715. The HP spool is similar to that of the BR710.

The IP compressor booster stages supercharge the core, increasing core power and thereby net thrust. However, a larger fan is required, to keep the specific thrust low enough to satisfy jet noise considerations.

This engine has a TSFC of 0.37 lb/(lbf⋅h) (10 g/(kN⋅s)) at static sea level takeoff and 0.62 lb/(lbf⋅h) (18 g/(kN⋅s)) at a cruise speed of Mach 0.8 and altitude of 35,000 ft (10,668 m).

==== BR725 ====
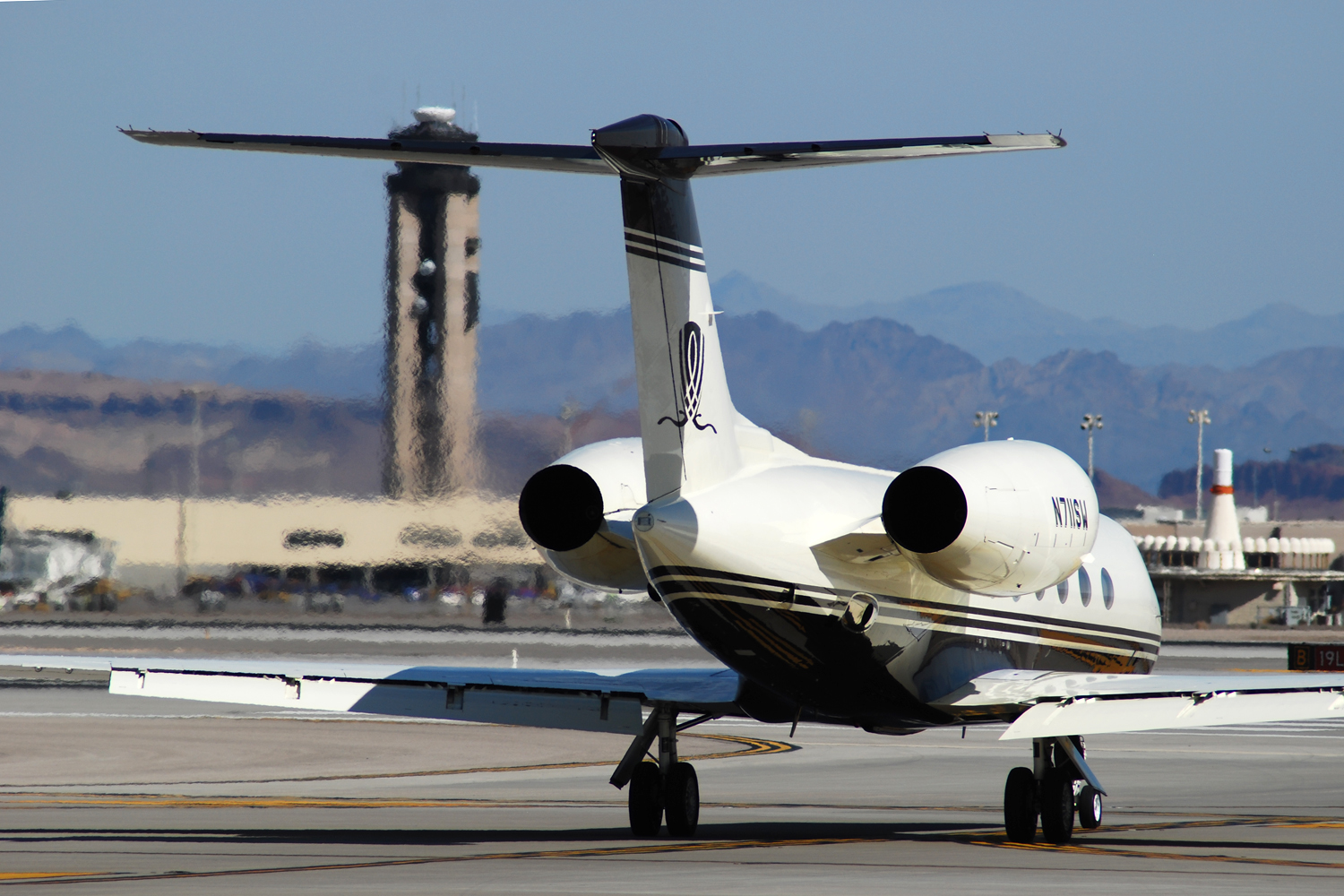
The BR725 powers the Gulfstream G650

The BR725 (BR700-725) is a variant of the BR710 to power the Gulfstream G650. Its prototype underwent component bench and its first full engine run in spring 2008. European certification was achieved in June 2009. The first Gulfstream G650, with BR725 engines, was delivered in December 2011.

The engine has a maximum thrust of 16,900 lbf (75.2 kN). The 50 in (130 cm) fan with 24 swept blades is 2 in (5.1 cm) larger than the BR710. The HP axial compressor benefits from three-dimensional aerodynamics for greater efficiency and has 10 stages including five blisks to reduce weight. The BR715 inspired combustor yields a longer life and lower emissions: 80% lower smoke and unburned hydrocarbons and 35% lower NOx than CAEP 6 limits. The two-stage HP turbine has blade active tip-clearance control for more efficiency; 3D aerodynamics reduce the cooling air flow. The LP turbine has three stages instead of two. The BR725 has a bypass ratio of 4.2:1 and is 4 dB quieter than the predecessor BR710. Its cruise thrust specific fuel consumption at Mach 0.85 and FL450 is 0.657 lb/(lbf⋅h) (18.6 g/(kN⋅s)).

===== F130 =====
On 24 September 2021, the United States Air Force (USAF) selected the F130 (the US military designation for the BR725) for the B-52H Stratofortress Commercial Engine Replacement Program (CERP). This version has 17,000 lbf (75.6 kN) thrust, similar to the existing engines (Pratt & Whitney TF33). The USAF will purchase 650 engines (608 direct replacements, 42 spares) for its fleet of 76 B-52H aircraft in a $2.6 billion deal; upgraded aircraft will be redesignated B-52J.

The CERP engines will be built at Rolls-Royce North America's plant in Indianapolis, Indiana.

Following the two year ground testing phase, the F130 passed its critical design review in December 2024. The engine "in flight" testing started in 2025, testing simulates "in flight" conditions using the wind tunnel at NASA Stennis. Initial tests exposed an issue with the engine pod inlet design, inlet distortion could cause "a non-uniform flow of air that can affect the engine’s performance and operability". Boeing completed a digital redesign of the inlet that in computer simulations solved the problem. The new inlet is yet to be tested in the wind tunnel. Barring any further issues final testing of the new engine/pod combination, which as of August 2025, was expected to be complete in 2026.

=== Pearl family of advancements ===
The Advance2 development effort inserts new, advanced technology into existing 15,000 lbf (67 kN) class BR710 and the larger BR725 engines. An even larger engine will also be made, with a 52 in (130 cm) fan. The BR710 and BR715 main developments, the next generation of 10,000–20,000 lbf (44–89 kN) engines to be introduced in the 2020s, will have an Advance3 core, improved engine health management, newer materials, and cooling. They will also have a “blisk” fan made out of titanium, with an overall pressure ratio of 50:1. These improvements will yield a 10% thrust specific fuel consumption reduction, 50% NOx margin improvement, 99.995% reliability, and a 20% better thrust-to-weight ratio. Derivatives under this category are uniformly marketed under the Rolls-Royce Pearl branding, despite their technical designations still reflect the BR700 lineage.

==== Pearl 15 ====
Pearl 15

The Pearl 15 (BR700-710D) engine was developed in Dahlewitz from the BR700 with Advance2 technologies. EASA certification was applied for on 28 February 2015. It made its first ground run in 2015, type tests in 2016, and flight tests in 2017. Six test engines logged over 6,000 cycles on 2,000 test hours. The test program included lightning strike, water ingestion, ice, and −40 °F (−40 °C) cold-start testing.

EASA certification was granted on 28 February 2018 and it was unveiled on 28 May 2018. It was undergoing flight tests in May 2018 for an end of 2019 planned entry into service aboard the Bombardier Global Express 5500 and 6500 developments. It should have logged 10,000 hours by then.

Its layout is similar to the BR725, with the same stage count and 24 titanium fan blades. Its fan has a 48.5 in (123 cm) diameter. The enhanced 3-stage LP turbine with advanced high temperature materials, advanced segments and seals allow for higher pressures and temperatures and the new low emissions cooled combustor includes a new tiled combustion chamber. Its core uses advanced nickel alloys and ceramic coatings, includes a new 10-stage HP compressor with 6 titanium blisks and a new 2-stage HP turbine with enhanced aerodynamics and blade cooling, enhanced segments and seals.

Its overall pressure ratio attains 43:1 and its bypass ratio 4.8:1. The HP compressor ratio rises to 24:1. It delivers up to 9% more thrust with 15,125 lbf (67.28 kN) and a 7% TSFC improvement while being 2 decibels quieter. Health monitoring should improve on the BR710 99.97% dispatch reliability which is logging one unplanned engine removal per 100,000 hours while the BR715 is approaching zero unplanned removals.

==== Pearl 700 ====
The Pearl 700 (BR700-730) powers the Gulfstream G700, a stretch of the previous G650, and the G800, with more range than the G650ER. Evolved from the BR725 with a similar architecture plus a fourth low-pressure turbine stage and a 2 in (5.1 cm) larger, 51.8 in (132 cm) blisk fan, its bypass ratio is higher than 6.5:1 and its overall pressure ratio should exceed 50:1. It nominally provide 18,250 lbf (81.2 kN) of thrust, 3-5% improved thrust specific fuel consumption than the BR725 variant powering the Gulfstream G650, reduced emissions and lower noise.

==== Pearl 10X ====
The upcoming Dassault Falcon 10X will be powered by two Pearl 10X engines over 18,000 lbf (80 kN) thrust, with a titanium fan blisk, a 10-stage HP compressor, a two-stage shroudless HP turbine and a four-stage LP turbine. The initial Pearl 10X test engine was first run in early 2022 and the programme had accumulated 1,000h of testing by May, along with the Advance2 demonstrator. The Advance2 core and new low-pressure system allows 5% more efficiency than the previous Rolls-Royce business jet engines.

== Variants ==
BR700-710A1-10
Variant with a 14,700 lbf (65.6 kN) takeoff rating and a maximum diameter of 72 in (1,820 mm) for the Gulfstream GV.
BR700-710A2-20
Variant with a 14,700 lbf (65.6 kN) takeoff rating and a maximum diameter of 72 in (1,820 mm) for the Bombardier Global Express/XRS/5000/6000.
BR700-710B3-40
Variant with a 16,000 lbf (69 kN) takeoff rating for the BAE Systems Nimrod MRA4.
BR700-710C4-11
Variant with a 15,400 lbf (68.4 kN) takeoff rating and a maximum diameter of 70.3 in (1,785 mm) for the Gulfstream GV-SP (G500/G550).
BR700-710D5-21
Variant with a 15,200 lbf (67.8 kN) takeoff rating and a maximum radius of 39 in (980 mm) for the Bombardier Global 5500/6500.
BR700-715A1-30
Variant with a 18,710 lbf (83.23 kN) takeoff rating for Boeing 717-200 basic gross weight variants.
BR700-715B1-30
Variant with an 20,160 lbf (89.68 kN) takeoff rating.
BR700-715C1-30
Variant with a 21,430 lbf (95.33 kN) takeoff rating for Boeing 717-200 high gross weight variants.
BR700-725A1-12
Variant with a 16,900 lbf (75.2 kN) takeoff rating and a fan diameter of 50 in (1,270 mm) for the Gulfstream GVI (G650).
F130
Military variant of the BR700-725 with a 17,000 lbf (75.62 kN) maximum rating for the Boeing B-52 Stratofortress.
BR700-TP
Turboprop variant rated at 10,000 shaft horsepower (7,460 kW) and proposed for the European Future Large Aircraft (which became the Airbus A400M Atlas military transporter/tanker).

The BR715 thrust ratings can be adjusted by changing a plug in the FADEC controller, meaning no engine change is required. The A1-30 can become a C1-30 with a simple plug and software change.

== Applications ==
=== Military applications ===
- BAE Systems Nimrod MRA4 (BR700-710B3-40)
  - Nimrod MRA4 (Royal Air Force - Maritime patrol aircraft prototype)
- Boeing B-52J Stratofortress (F130 variant)
  - B-52J (USAF, strategic bomber)
- Bombardier Global Express
  - Global 5000 (BR700-710A2-20)
    - Global 5000 VIP (Angolan Armed Forces, German Air Force - VIP transport aircraft)
    - Global 5000 ELINT (Indian Air Force - ELINT aircraft)
  - Global 5500 (BR700-710D5-21)
    - Global 5500 VIP (Botswana Air Force - VIP transport aircraft)
  - Global 6000 (BR700-710A2-20)
    - Global 6000 VIP (German Air Force, Royal Malaysian Air Force - VIP transport aircraft)
    - E11A BACN (USAF - Battlefield Airborne Communications Node)
    - Global 6000 EW (Pakistani Air Force, Turkish Air Force - electronic warfare aircraft)
    - GlobalEye (Swedish Air Force, United Arab Emirates Air Force -AEW&C)
    - Pegasus (German Air Force - SIGINT aircraft)
    - Raytheon Sentinel (Royal Air Force - airborne battlefield and ground surveillance aircraft)
  - Global 6500 (BR700-710D5-21)
    - Global 6500 VIP (Swedish Air Force - VIP transport aircraft)
    - HADES (USA - ELINT / SIGINT aircraft)
- Dassault Falcon 10X (Pearl 10X)
- Gulfstream:
  - Gulfstream V (BR710A1-10)
    - C37A (Japan Coast Guard - maritime surveillance search and rescue)
    - C37A (USAF, US Army, USMC, US Navy, USCG - VIP transport aircraft)
    - GV (Algerian Air Force, Hellenic Air Force, State of Kuwait - VIP transport aircraft)
    - SEMA (Israeli Ministry of Defense - Special Electronic Mission Aircraft)
  - Gulfstream G550 (BR710 C4-11)
    - C-37B (USAF - VIP transport aircraft)
    - EA-37B Compass Call (Italian Air Force, USAF - EW aircraft)
    - MC-55A Peregrine (Australian Air Force - ELINT / SIGINT)
    - G550 CAEW (Israeli Air Force, Italian Air Force, Singapore Air Force - AEW&C)

=== Civilian applications ===
- Bombardier Global Express
  - Global 5000 (BR700-710A2-20)
  - Global 5500 (BR700-710D5-21)
  - Global 6000 (BR700-710A2-20)
  - Global 6500 (BR700-710D5-21)
- Boeing 717 (BR715-A1-30)
- Dassault Falcon 10X (Pearl 10X)
- Gulfstream
  - Gulfstream V (BR710A1-10)
  - Gulfstream G550 (BR710 C4-11)
  - Gulfstream G650 (BR700-725A1-12)
  - Gulfstream G650ER (BR700-725A1-12)
  - Gulfstream G700 (Pearl 700)
  - Gulfstream G800 (Pearl 700)
- Rekkof/Fokker XF70/XF100
- Tupolev Tu-334

== Specifications ==
EASA Type Certificate Data Sheet
Model	BR700-710A1/A2/C4 (BR710)	BR700-715 (BR715)	BR700-725A1 (BR725)	BR700-710D5-21 (Pearl 15)	BR700-730B2-14 (Pearl 700)	Pearl 10X
Compressor	1 fan, 10 HPC	1 fan, 2 LPC, 10 HPC	1 fan, 10 HPC			
Turbine	2 HPT, 2 LPT	2 HPT, 3 LPT			2 HPT, 4 LPT	
Thrust	15,400 lbf (68.4 kN)	21,430 lbf (95.33 kN)	16,900 lbf (75.2 kN)	15,200 lbf (67.8 kN)	18,250 lbf (81.2 kN)	18,250 lbf (81.2 kN)
Dry Weight	4,009 lb (1,818.4 kg)	4,597 lb (2,085 kg)	3,605 lb (1,635.2 kg)	4,032 lb (1,828.8 kg)	3,565 lb (1,617.1 kg)	
Thrust / Weight	3.84	4.66	4.69	3.77	5.12	
Length	183.8 in (4,669 mm)	147.2 in (3,738 mm)	129.8 in (3,297 mm)	189.3 in (4,809 mm)	128.7 in (3,268 mm)	
Rotor RPM	LP: 6,096, HP: 16,661	LP: 6,096, HP: 16,661	LP: 6,096, HP: 16,661	LP: 7,431, HP: 19,000	LP: 6,500, HP: 19,000	
Fan Diameter	48 in (122 cm)	58 in (147 cm)	50 in (127 cm)	48.5 in (123 cm)	51.8 in (132 cm)	
Bypass ratio	3.84:1	4.55–4.68:1	4.1:1	4.8:1	>6.5:1	
Overall pressure ratio				43:1	>50:1	

== See also ==
Comparable engines

- General Electric CF34
- General Electric Passport
- IAE V2500
- PowerJet SaM146
- Pratt & Whitney PW6000
- Progress D-436

Related lists

- List of aircraft engines
