= BAE Systems Nimrod MRA4 =

British planned maritime patrol and attack aircraft

Nimrod MRA4
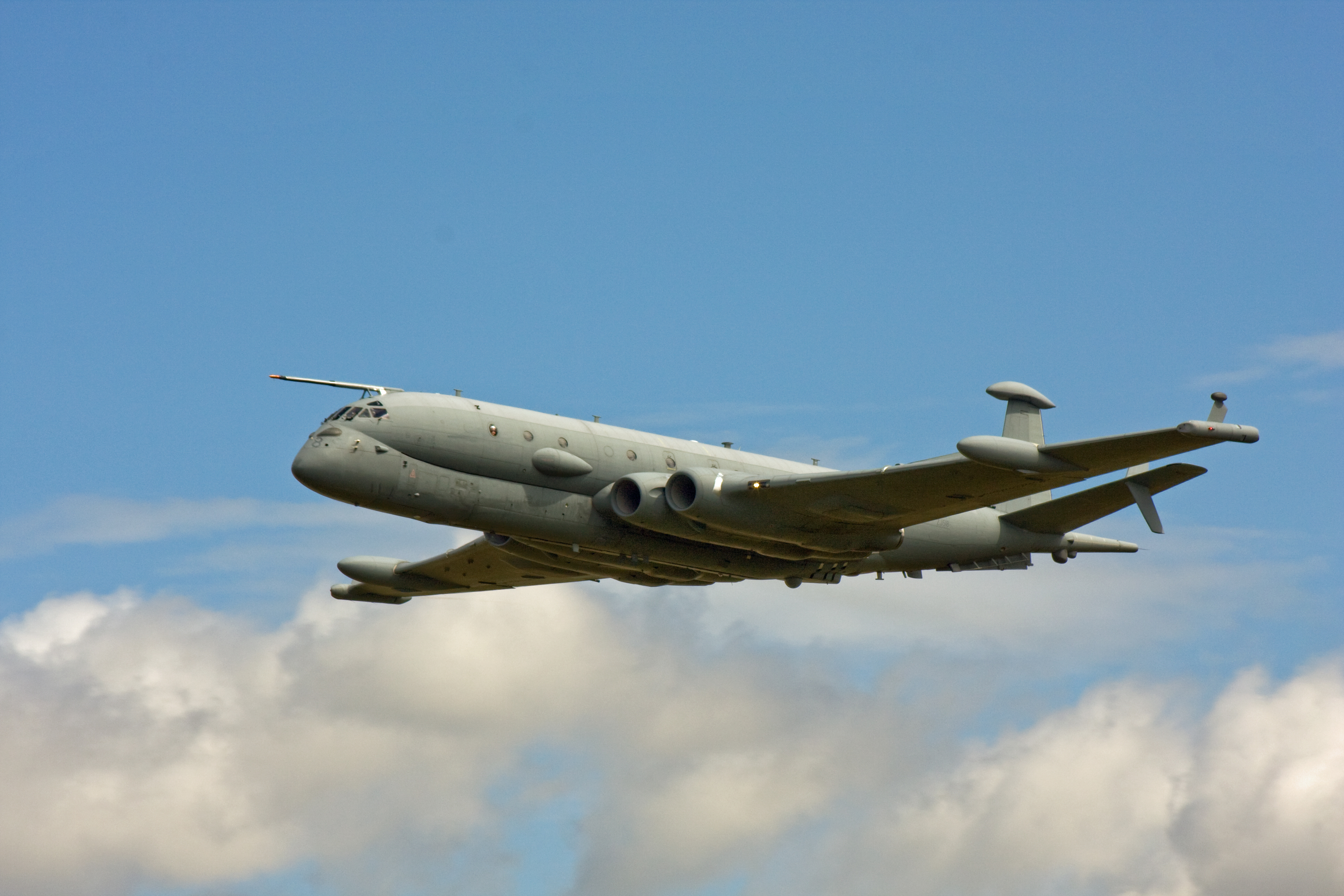
- Nimrod MRA4 during a test flight

General information
- Type: Maritime patrol aircraft
- National origin: United Kingdom
- Manufacturer: BAE Systems
- Status: Cancelled
- Number built: 3 development plus 2 production

History
- First flight: 26 August 2004
- Developed from: Hawker Siddeley Nimrod MR2

The BAE Systems Nimrod MRA4 was a planned maritime patrol and attack aircraft intended to replace the Hawker Siddeley Nimrod MR2. The rebuilt aircraft would have extended the operating life of the Nimrod fleet by several decades and significantly improved the aircraft by installing more efficient Rolls-Royce BR700 turbofan jet engines to almost double the flight range. The conversion of the flight deck to a digital glass cockpit would have simplified control operations and reduced crew requirements. New detection systems were to be installed, as well as additional weapons for anti-submarine warfare.

However, the project was subject to significant delays due to cost overruns and contract re-negotiations. This was partly due to difficulties combining refurbished Nimrod MR2 fuselages, which had not been built to a common standard, with newly built wings. The numbers of aircraft to be procured fell from twenty-one to nine over a course of years, while costs continued to climb.

The MRA4 was ultimately cancelled in 2010 as a result of the Strategic Defence and Security Review (SDSR), at which point it was £789 million over-budget and over nine years late. No direct replacement was under development at that stage, with the roles intended for the MRA4 filled by existing assets such as the Type 23 Frigate and the Merlin helicopter. However the UK announced its intention to order nine P-8 Poseidon ASW aircraft as part of the 2015 SDSR at a cost of £3 billion; these aircraft were delivered between October 2019 and January 2022 and operate from RAF Lossiemouth in Scotland.

== Development ==
=== Origins ===
In 1990, the UK abandoned options for avionics, sensors and tactical system upgrades of the MR2. In 1993, the RAF issued a request for information for a Replacement Maritime Patrol Aircraft (RMPA) procurement programme, also known as Staff Requirement (Air) 420, which was intended to replace their fleet of Nimrod MR2 aircraft. In response to the requirement, several different companies soon submitted their bids to meet the outlined demands. British Aerospace (BAe), which had studied prospective options to replace the Nimrod MR2 since 1986, including a variant of the Airbus A310 and other civil conversion projects, ultimately settled on a proposal that involved an extensive rebuild of existing Nimrod MR2s marketed under the name Nimrod 2000. As well as operational performance, the key criteria were cost and a short procurement timescale; these "ruled out a new design or adaption of an existing civil aircraft."

BAe evaluated several different engines to power the Nimrod 2000, such as the Rolls-Royce Tay turbofan, the Pratt & Whitney JT8D-200 turbofan, and the General Electric CF34 turbofan, before settling upon the Rolls-Royce BR710 engine. In 1995, it was claimed that the Nimrod MR2 airframes were of a sufficient condition in that they could readily serve through the intended 25-year service life and that "retained airframe items are low risk". According to BAe, the Nimrod's airframe represented "probably the best understood airframe in the RAF inventory".

Amongst various other bids submitted were Lockheed Corporation, which marketed its P-3 Orion as the Orion 2000, Loral Corporation proposed to rebuild ex-US Navy Orions, and Dassault which sought to develop the improved Atlantique 3. On 12 January 1996, Dassault announced that they had withdrawn their Atlantique 3 following discussions with the MOD; Whitehall sources stated that Dassault had found "...no value in pursuing its tender", and that the RAF had an expressed preference for a four-engine aircraft.

In March 1996, BAe promoted the option of establishing a production line to manufacture new-build Nimrod aircraft as an alternative to the refurbishment of existing airframes, which was reportedly motivated by service concerns regarding attrition rates of the existing aircraft. It was also announced that preliminary talks had been conducted with the South African Air Force on the topic of the Nimrod 2000. In June 1996, BAe announced that it had partnered with McDonnell Douglas to market new-build Nimrod 2000s to the export market; it has been claimed that this move was in response to scepticism from the MoD over the prospects of export sales for the type. BAe argued that the Nimrod 2000's selection would give it entry to the global maritime patrol aircraft market.

As part of Lockheed's submission, the firm offered a formal guarantee of a 20 per cent workshare on all future export sales of its Orion 2000 while simultaneously lobbying for the US Navy to also procure the type. Loral stated that it believed that its bid to refurbish stored P-3s was the most cost-effective submission; however, there was public controversy over whether Loral possessed the necessary technical information on the airframe, claims which Loral refuted. In early 1996, Loral's defense assets were acquired by Lockheed, leaving just the latter and British Aerospace in the competition by mid-1996. In May 1996, it was reported that bidders were considering self-funding their own early development costs in order to compensate for alleged funding shortfalls within the MoD's procurement budget; it was claimed that these funding shortfalls were due to differences between the original specification, which had envisioned as an off-the-shelf procurement without much in terms of development, and the increasingly extensive nature that the programme had progressively taken on.

=== Selection ===
In June 1996, the MoD's Equipment Approvals Committee recommended that the Nimrod 2000 bid be selected to meet the RAF's requirement. In July 1996, in response to the committee's decision, Lockheed Martin announced that it had reduced the cost of its Orion 2000 submission by 15 per cent amid a series of last-minute discussions held between Lockheed Martin President Norman R. Augustine, General Electric Company President Lord Weinstock, Secretary of State for Defence Michael Portillo and Deputy Prime Minister Michael Heseltine, seeking a 90-day interval to fully revise their bid. In July 1996, it was announced that the £2 billion contract had been awarded to British Aerospace to produce the Nimrod 2000. By the time of formal contract award in December the aircraft had received the designation Nimrod MRA4.

The Nimrod MRA4 was to be produced as essentially a new aircraft. Significant changes were involved in the remanufacturing process, including the installation of BR710 turbofan engines, the adoption of a larger and more efficient wing with 23% greater surface area, various new missions systems and avionics, and an extensively refurbished fuselage. Much larger air intakes were required on the MRA4 in order to provide the necessary airflow requirements imposed by the BR710 engine, which is significantly greater than that of the Spey 250 that had powered the original Nimrod variants. The larger wing increased fuel capacity by 30% which, combined with efficient modern engines, allowed for unrefuelled endurance in excess of 14 hours. The MRA4 had also borrowed heavily from Airbus technology; the glass cockpit used was derived from that used on Airbus A320/A340 airliners. BAe also teamed up with Boeing to provide the Nimrod MRA4's mission systems, making use of the latter's work on mooted patrol aircraft systems for the P-3 and Boeing 737.

According to BAE Systems, the Nimrod MRA4's systems would enable the crews to gather, process and display up to 20 times more technical and strategic data than the MR2. The Searchwater 2000 MR radar was stated to have been capable over land as well as water; with the ability to have swept an area the size of the UK every 10 seconds. The Aircraft Synthetic Training Aids (ASTA) provided by Thales Training & Simulation was an electronic training suite to allow the training of crew members to transfer from active MRA4 aircraft to ground-based training systems; this change was made to increase the availability of the aircraft for operational missions and allow for more intensive training exercises.

=== Delays and development problems ===
The original scheduled date of entry into service for the MRA4 was April 2003; however, development proved far more protracted than anticipated. Early on, an independent company, Flight Refuelling Ltd., had been contracted to undertake the conversions to MRA4 standard, however BAE discovered that the Nimrod airframes supplied by the RAF were not built to a common standard and this considerably complicated the refurbishment process. The task of converting the existing airframes was transferred in-house to BAE Systems Woodford. The BAE team at Woodford then found that the new wing was flawed, which resulted in the project being put on hold while another wing design was developed.

In December 2002, BAE Systems issued a shock profit warning due to cost overruns of the Nimrod MRA4 and the Astute-class submarine projects. On 19 February 2003, BAE took a charge of £500 million against the MRA4 contract. The company had previously taken a £300 million "loss charge" in 2000, which was expected to cover "all the costs of completion of the current contract". The contract was renegotiated for the second time in 2002, where the aircraft requirement was reduced from 21 to 18.

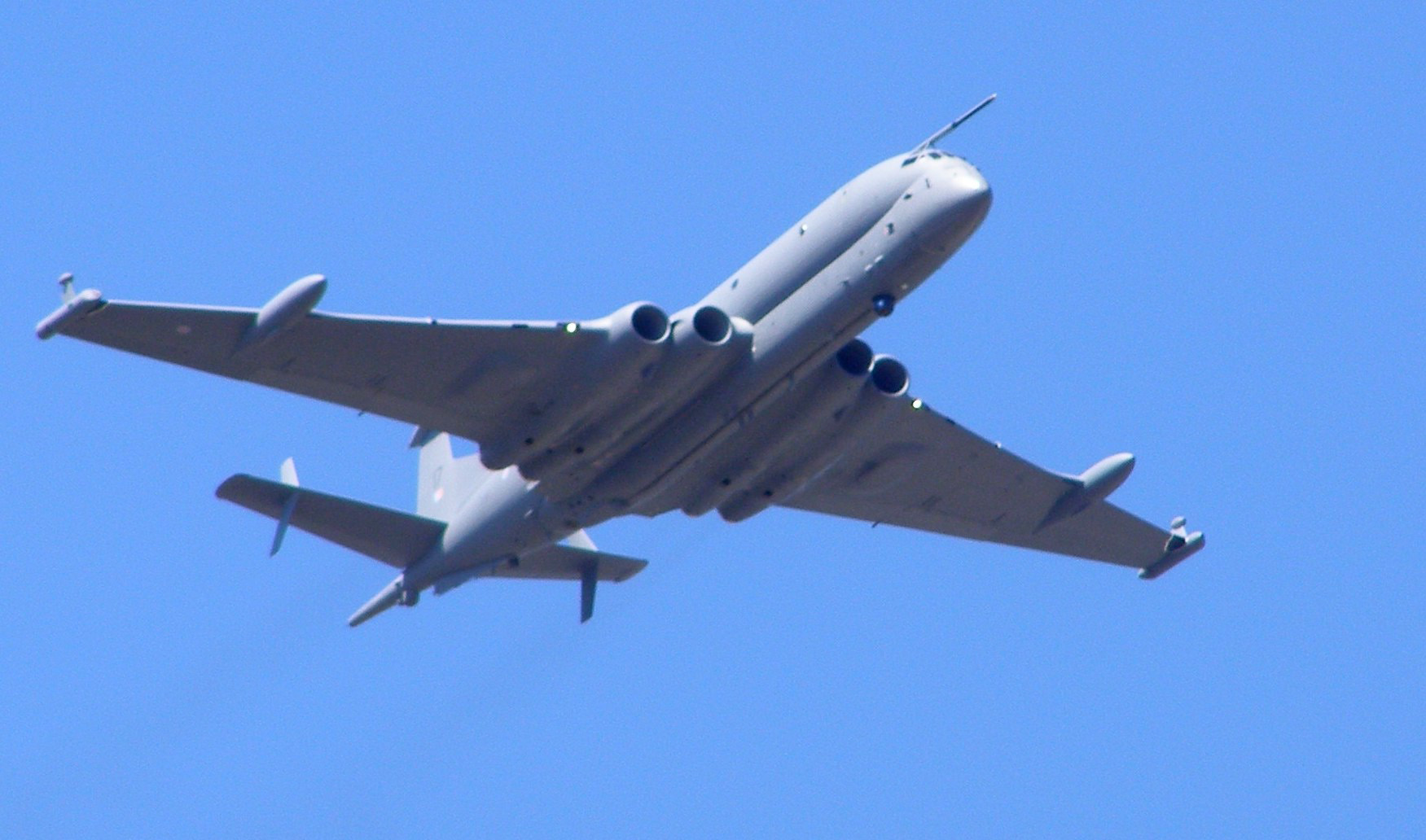
Nimrod MRA4 at the Farnborough Airshow

Announcing plans for the future of the British military on 21 July 2004, the Defence Secretary Geoff Hoon detailed plans to reduce the upgrade programme to cover only 16 MRA4 aircraft, and suggested that an eventual fleet of 12 might suffice. PA01, the first development MRA4, completed its maiden flight on 26 August 2004. This was followed by PA02's first flight in December 2004 which was used to test elements of the mission system and the air vehicle. BAE Systems received a contract worth £1.1 billion for 12 MRA4s on 18 July 2006; three were to be development aircraft and nine more converted to production standard. The Nimrod MRA4 successfully released the Sting Ray torpedo for the first time on 30 July 2007.

Further disputes over cost meant that the number of MRA4s to be delivered was further reduced to nine by Spring 2008. The first production aircraft took its maiden flight on 10 September 2009. At the time of the flight, each MRA4 was to cost at least £400 million. The Ministry of Defence announced in December 2009 that the introduction of the MRA4 would be delayed until 2012 as part of defence spending cuts. In March 2010, the first production Nimrod MRA4 was delivered to the RAF for acceptance testing; in August 2010, the RAF launched its instructor training course using the type. The MRA4 fleet was expected to attain initial operational capability in October 2012. The Nimrod MRA4 was planned to operate out from its main base at RAF Kinloss, Scotland.

=== Cancellation ===
"[The] loss of the capability offered by the Nimrod [MRA4] would have an adverse effect on the protection of the strategic nuclear deterrent [Trident missiles on Vanguard-class submarines], the provision of which is one of the Ministry of Defence's Standing Strategic Tasks. In addition, the maintenance of the integrity of the UK through detection of hostile air and sea craft would be compromised."

— National Audit Office

In the 2010 Strategic Defence and Security Review of the Armed Forces, the UK government announced the cancellation of the MRA4 on 19 October 2010 and consequently that RAF Kinloss, the intended base for the Nimrod fleet, would be closed. On 24 November 2010, 382 sub-contract workers previously working on the MRA4 were laid off at BAE Systems Warton and Woodford. After the airframes were stripped of electronic equipment, the remaining fuselages were scrapped at BAE Systems Woodford beginning on 26 January 2011. Although the process was conducted behind screens intended to hide the process from the media, the BBC flew a helicopter over Woodford and broadcast footage of the scrapping in progress.

Although late and over-budget the decision to cancel the MRA4 was controversial as the remaining airframes had all been near completion. It has been reported that following the retirement of the Nimrod MR2 (in March 2010), Russian submarines have been able to travel past the UK in international waters, but they could not be tracked because of the lack of suitable aircraft. In November and early December 2014 four maritime patrol aircraft operated by France, Canada and the United States were based at RAF Lossiemouth to attempt to locate a Russian submarine which had been spotted in British territorial waters off west Scotland.

The aircraft would also have been used in the civilian search and rescue role; the Nimrod MR2 had often been used in this role. In this respect the Strategic Defence and Security Review stated that the UK "will depend on other maritime assets to contribute to the tasks previously planned for [the Nimrod MRA4]".

Nimrod airframes being broken up for scrap in January 2011

Following the cancellation, the Defence Secretary Liam Fox used the Nimrod MRA4 procurement as an example of the worst of MOD procurement performance: "The idea that we ever allow ourselves into a position where something that was originally Nimrod 2000 – where we ordered [21] was reduced to nine, spent £3.8bn and we still weren't close to getting the capability – is not to happen again." Nevertheless, six ex-defence chiefs publicly criticised the decision to scrap the Nimrods in January 2011 and the Public Accounts Committee concluded in February 2012 that the decision had been made without a proper understanding of the cost implications and had wasted £3.4bn.

In January 2011, it was reported by the Financial Times that when the decision was taken to scrap the aircraft, "[The MRA4] was still riddled with flaws.... Safety tests conducted [in 2010] found there were still 'several hundred design non-compliances' with the aircraft. It was unclear, for example, whether its bomb bay doors functioned properly, whether its landing gear worked and, most worryingly, whether its fuel pipe was safe." According to Air Forces Monthly magazine, "significant aerodynamic issues and associated flying control concerns in certain regimes of flight meant that it was grounded at the time of cancellation and may not have been signed over as safe by the Military Aviation Authority." The magazine also stated that the reason for the cancellation was that the RAF and Navy placed a higher priority on fast jets and frigates than on maritime patrol.

=== Replacement ===
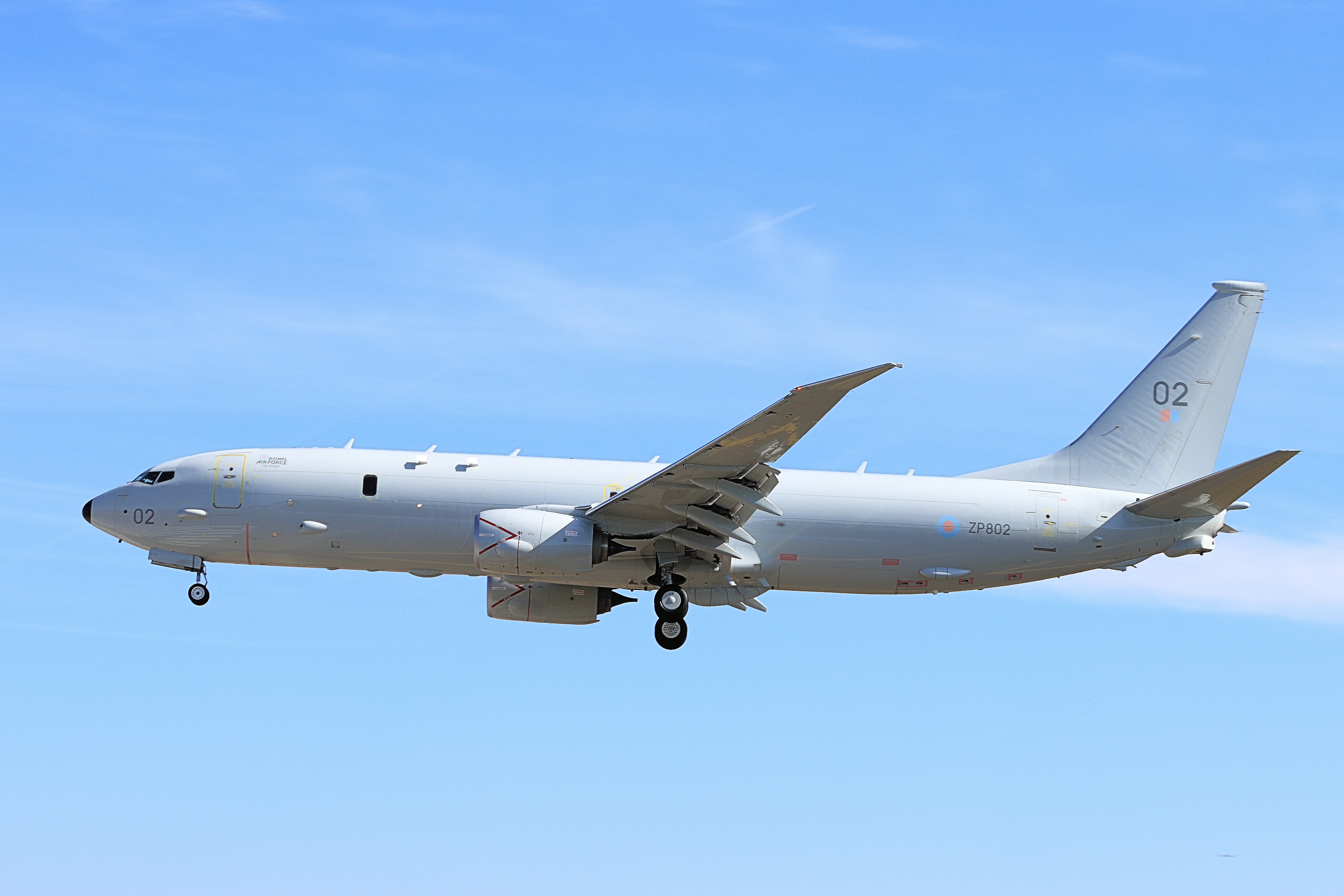
A RAF P-8 Poseidon in 2022

Reports in mid-2011 suggested that a purchase of up to five P-8 Poseidons was under consideration, while in January 2015 it was reported that attempts had been made to sell the Kawasaki P-1 as another possible replacement. In November 2015, as part of the Strategic Defence and Security Review, the Ministry of Defence announced the procurement of nine P-8 Poseidons, which will undertake the range of tasks that were undertaken by the Nimrod MR.2 and intended for the MRA.4. The RAF took delivery of its first Poseidon MRA1 in Seattle in October 2019 and the aircraft arrived in the UK in February 2020.

== Specifications (MRA4) ==
Data from RAF Aircraft - Nimrod MR2/R1

General characteristics

- Crew: 10
- Length: 126 ft 9 in (38.63 m)
- Wingspan: 127 ft (39 m)
- Height: 31 ft 0 in (9.45 m)
- Wing area: 2,538 sq ft (235.8 m^{2})
- Empty weight: 114,000 lb (51,710 kg)
- Max takeoff weight: 232,315 lb (105,376 kg)
- Powerplant: 4 × Rolls-Royce BR710 turbofan engines, 15,500 lbf (69 kN) thrust each

Performance

- Maximum speed: 496 kn (571 mph, 919 km/h)
- Maximum speed: Mach 0.77
- Range: 6,004 nmi (6,909 mi, 11,119 km) with all four engines operating theoretical maximum range extends to 6,641 nmi (7,642 mi; 12,299 km) when loitering or cruising on two engines with the outer pair shut down for maximum fuel conservation.
- Service ceiling: 36,000 ft (11,000 m)

Armament

- Hardpoints: 4× under-wing pylon stations and an internal bomb bay with a capacity of 22,000 lb (10,000 kg), with provisions to carry combinations of:
  - Rockets: None
  - Missiles:
    - Air-to-air missile:
      - 2× AIM-9 Sidewinder
    - Air-to-surface missile:
      - AGM-65 Maverick
      - AGM-84 Harpoon
      - Storm Shadow
  - Bombs:
    - Depth charges
  - Other:
    - Air-dropped Mk.46 torpedoes
    - Sting Ray torpedoes
    - Naval mines
    - Sonobuoys

Avionics

- Thales Searchwater 2000 multi-mode search radar
- CDC/Ultra UYS503/AQS970 acoustic processor
- Northrop Grumman Nighthunter Electro-Optical Search and Detection System
- Elta EL/L-8300UK ESM system

== See also ==
Related development

- de Havilland Comet
- Hawker Siddeley Nimrod
- Hawker Siddeley Nimrod R1
- British Aerospace Nimrod AEW3

Aircraft of comparable role, configuration, and era

- Boeing P-8 Poseidon
- Kawasaki P-1
