= Dassault Falcon 10X =

French business jet

Falcon 10X
- Rendering of Dassault Falcon 10X

General information
- Type: Intercontinental business jet
- National origin: France
- Manufacturer: Dassault Aviation
- Status: In development
- Number built: 1 prototype

History
- Introduction date: 2029 (planned)
- First flight: June 19, 2026; 5 months ago

The Dassault Falcon 10X is a large, long-range business jet under development by Dassault Aviation in France.

== Development ==
On 6 May 2021, Dassault launched its $75 million Falcon 10X flagship to compete with the Bombardier Global 7500 and the Gulfstream G700. Originally scheduled for 2025, and then 2027, the aircraft is now expected to enter service in 2029.

== Design ==
Dassault Falcon 10X Model on display at RetroMobile NYC, 2026

It is 33.4 m (110 ft) long and has a 33.6 m (110 ft) wide, high aspect ratio carbonfibre wing, a first for a Dassault business jet. Powered by two Rolls-Royce Pearl 10X engines with 80 kN (18,000 lbf) thrust. It has a 16.4 m (54 ft) long, four-zone cabin wider than its competition, 2.77 by 2.0 m (9 ft 1 in by 6 ft 7 in) wide and high, with a 3,000 ft (900 m) cabin altitude at 41,000 ft (12,500 m) and 50% larger windows than on the Falcon 8X.

It should cruise at Mach 0.85-0.925 with a range of 7,500 nmi (13,900 km), and should access steep approaches like London City Airport. With sidesticks and a single throttle lever, the fly-by-wire flight control system has flightpath stability to avoid trimming, and head-up display-based FalconEye combined vision system. High automation with automated return to straight and level flight, emergency descent, reduced take-off thrust and noise abatement modes could allow two pilots to fly for 15h instead of three currently.

== See also ==
Aircraft of comparable role, configuration, and era

- Bombardier Global 7500
- Gulfstream G700

Related lists

- List of civil aircraft

== Specifications ==
Model	Falcon 10X
Length	33.4 m (110 ft)
Height	8.4 m (28 ft)
Wingspan	33.6 m (110 ft)
Cabin height	2.03 m (6 ft 8 in)
Cabin width	2.77 m (9 ft 1 in)
Cabin length	16.4 m (54 ft)
Max takeoff weight	52,163 kg (115,000 lb)
Empty weight	27,805 kg (61,300 lb)
Fuel capacity	23,451 kg (51,701 lb)
Turbofan	2 × Rolls-Royce Pearl 10X
Thrust	2 × 80 kN (18,000 lb_{f})
Cruise	Mach 0.85 – Mach 0.925 (488–531 kn; 561–611 mph; 903–983 km/h)
Ceiling	51,000 ft (15,545 m)
Range	7,500 nmi (8,600 mi; 13,900 km)
Balanced takeoff	1,829 m (6,001 ft)
Landing	762 m (2,500 ft)
