= Gulfstream G550 =

Executive transport aircraft family

Gulfstream G500/G550 C-37B
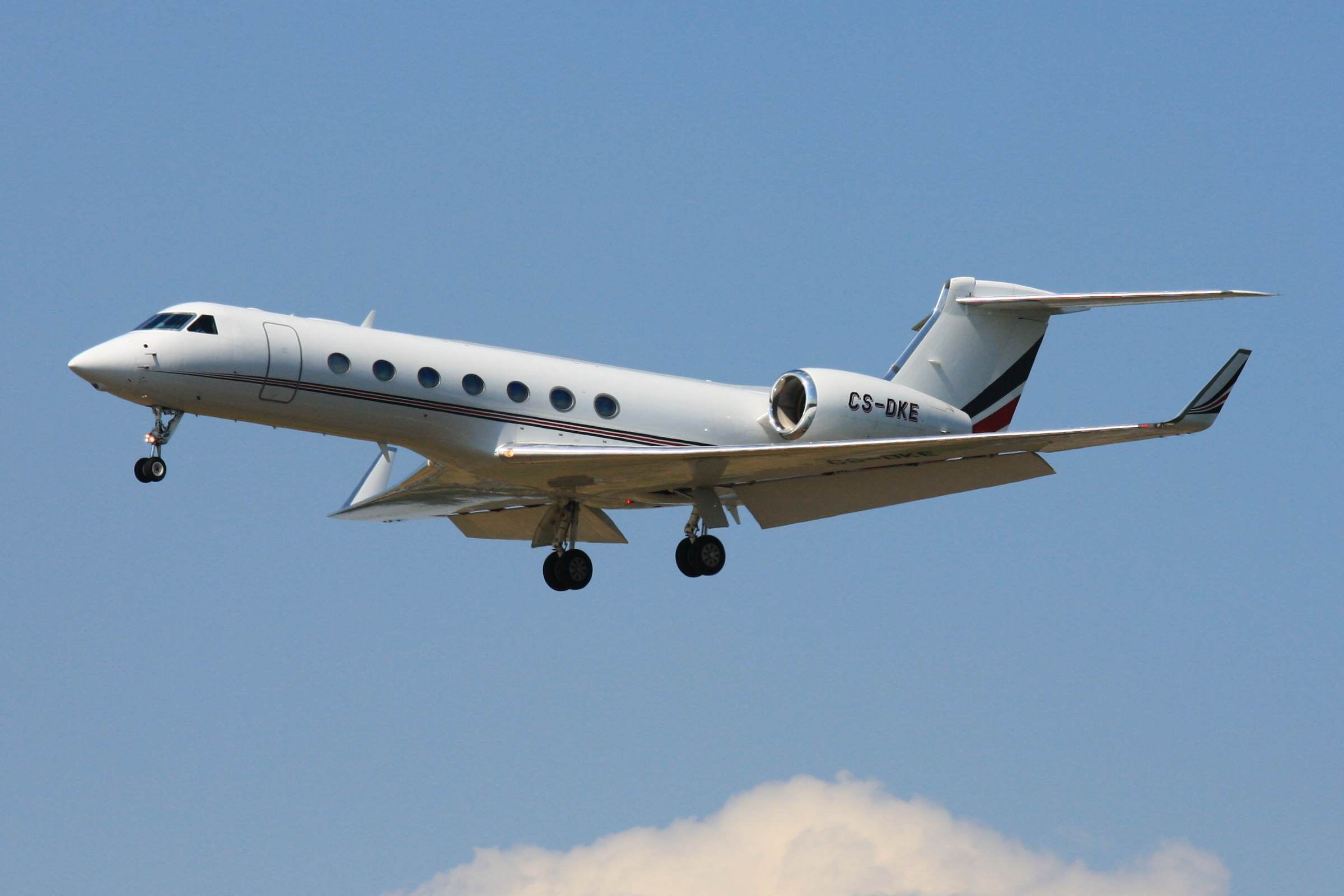
- A Netjets Europe G550 business jet on final approach

General information
- Type: Business jet
- National origin: United States
- Manufacturer: Gulfstream Aerospace
- Status: In service
- Primary users: United States Air Force United States Navy; Israeli Air Force
- Number built: >600

History
- Manufactured: 2003–2021
- Introduction date: 2004
- First flight: 31 August 2001
- Developed from: Gulfstream V
- Variant: L3Harris EA-37B Compass Call
- Successors: Gulfstream G600

The Gulfstream G550 is an American business jet aircraft produced by the General Dynamics' Gulfstream Aerospace unit in Savannah, Georgia, US. The certification designation is GV-SP. A version with reduced fuel capacity was marketed as the G500. Gulfstream ceased production of the G550 in July 2021.

The U.S. Military uses the Gulfstream G550 design as the C-37B and EA-37B Compass Call, the related Gulfstream V is the C-37A.

== Development ==
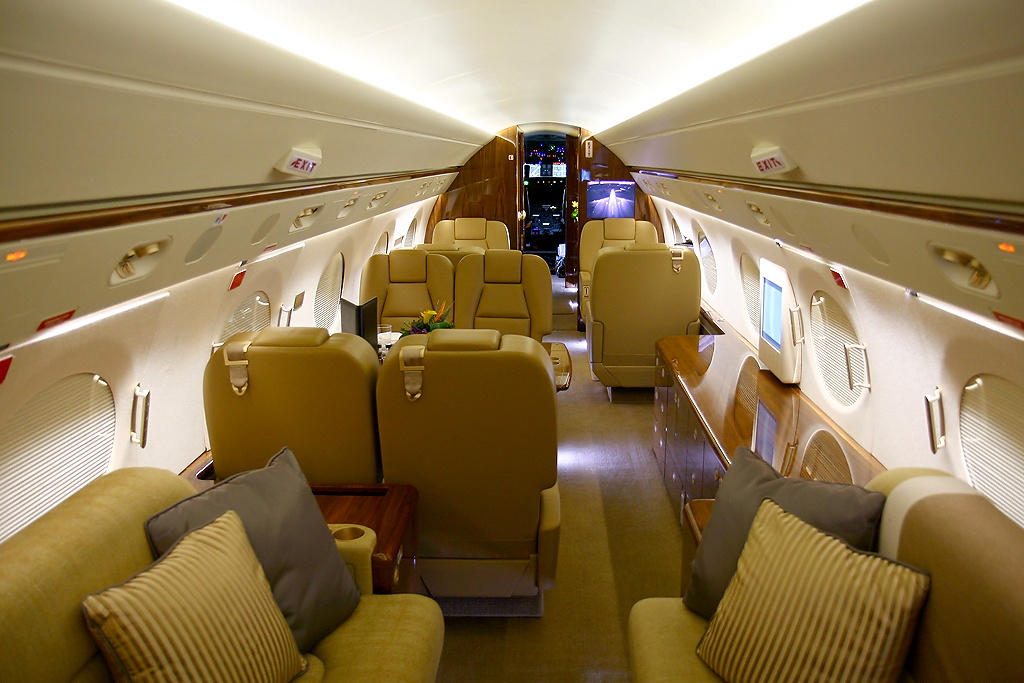
G550 cabin

The first production G550 (GV-SP) flew on 18 July 2002 and the aircraft received its FAA type certificate on August 14, 2003. In 2014, Gulfstream looked at a re-engine with the Rolls-Royce Pearl BR700 development announced in May 2018 for the new Global Express 5500 and 6500 variants but preferred the BR725-powered, 7,500 nmi G650. The 500th Gulfstream G550 aircraft was delivered in May 2015.

Deliveries went from 50 aircraft in 2011 to 19 in 2016 and with 40 units for sale in a fleet of 540. Valuations of the G550 are falling: a 10-year-old G550 valued $28 million a year before is worth $18-$20 million in January 2017, while a two-year-old went from $40 to $35 million. In May 2017, early 2003 G550s were valued at $14 million against more than $45 million for newly purchased aircraft, flying an average of 425 hours per year. In December 2018, a 2012-2013 G550 was valued $28-31 million, and cost $7,135 per hour for 400 hours a year.

As it was replaced by the Gulfstream G600 by October 2019, the G550 was kept in limited production for long-term special missions applications and government orders.

The final commercially available G550 was delivered in June 2021 after more than 600 of the aircraft were produced.

== Design ==
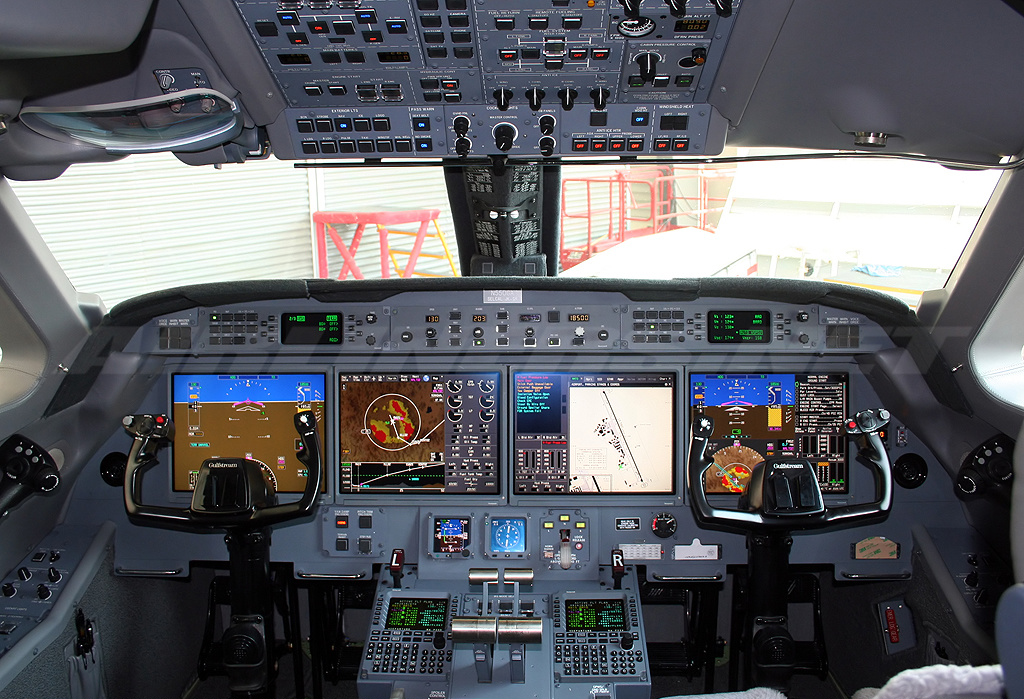
G550 flight deck

Compared to the Gulfstream V, drag reduction details boost range by 250 nmi (460 km) and increase fuel efficiency. Maximum takeoff weight (MTOW) is increased by 500 lb (230 kg) and takeoff performance is enhanced. A seventh pair of windows is added and the entry door is moved 2 ft (0.61 m) forward to increase usable cabin length. The PlaneView flight deck features cursor control devices, Honeywell Primus Epic avionics, standard head-up guidance system by Rockwell Collins and enhanced vision system by Elbit, improving situational awareness in reduced visibility conditions.

Initial long-range cruise altitude is FL 400–410, first hour fuel burn is 4,500–5,000 lb (2,000–2,300 kg) que decreasing for the second hour to 3,000 and 2,400 lb (1,400 and 1,100 kg) for the last hour. Flight hourly budget is $700–950 for engine reserves, $250 for parts and 2.5 maintenance hours. It competed against the Bombardier Global 6000, which has higher direct operating costs and less range but a more spacious cross section, and the Dassault Falcon 7X with fly-by-wire flight controls, better fuel efficiency and a wider but shorter cabin.

== Variants ==
GV-SP
The same as the Gulfstream V or GV with a new flightdeck display system, airframe aerodynamic and engine improvements, main entry door moved forward, also marketed as the G550.
G500
The Gulfstream G500 has a reduced fuel capacity. Introduced in 2004 as a shorter 5,800 nautical miles (6,700 mi; 10,700 km) range version, it has the same exterior appearance, as well as the PlaneView cockpit, but Visual Guidance System (HUD) and Enhanced Vision System (EVS) are options. Its unit cost was $48.25 million in 2012 (equivalent to $68 million in 2025)
G550
Marketing name for the GV-SP. Its equipped price was $54.5 million in 2021 (equivalent to $65 million in 2025).

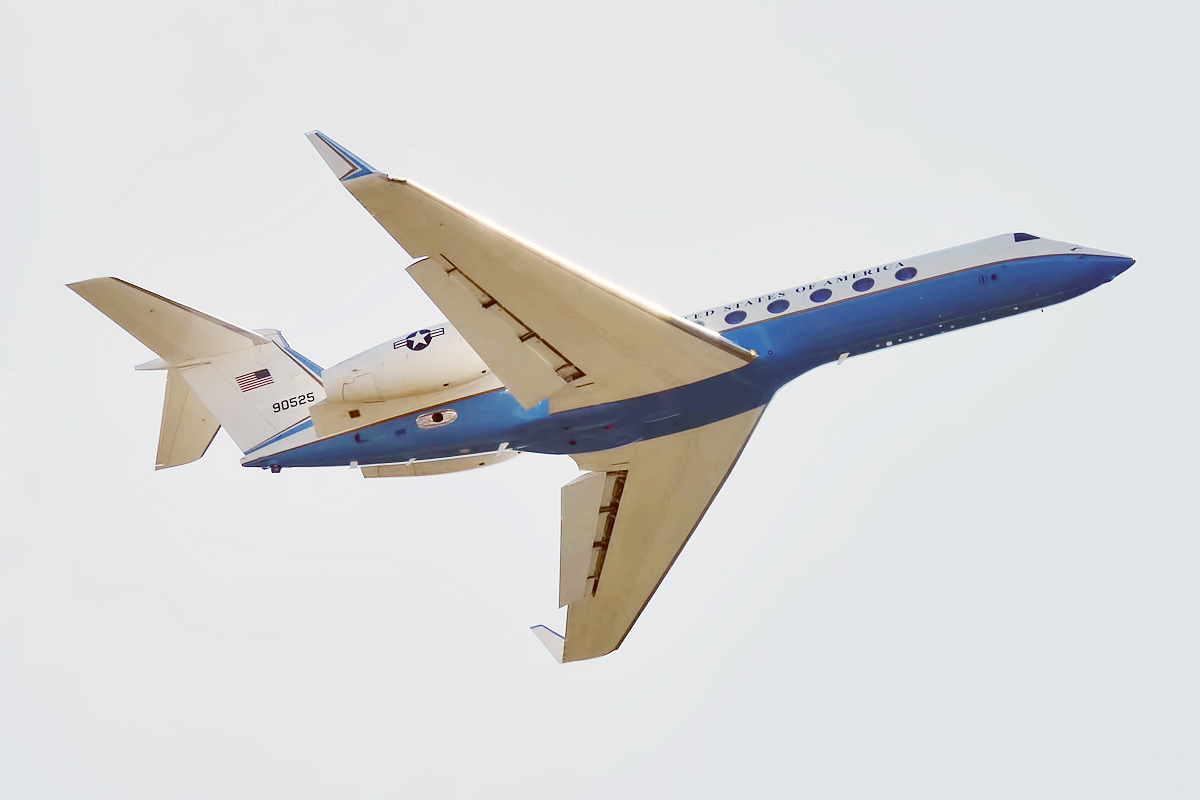
U.S. Air Force C-37B

C-37B
U.S. military designation for the G550 in a VIP passenger configuration.
EA-37B Compass Call
U.S. military designation G550 version in an Electronic Warfare configuration to replace USAF's existing EC-130H Compass Call aircraft. Previously known as EC-37B, on November 14, 2023, Air Combat Command redesignated the platform as EA-37B to better identify its mission of finding and attacking enemy land or sea targets.
NC-37B
U.S. military designation for proposed G550 with the "Conformal AEW" body shape for use as range telemetry aircraft for U.S. Navy.
MC-55A Peregrine
Royal Australian Air Force designation for SIGINT and ELINT intelligence gathering variant.

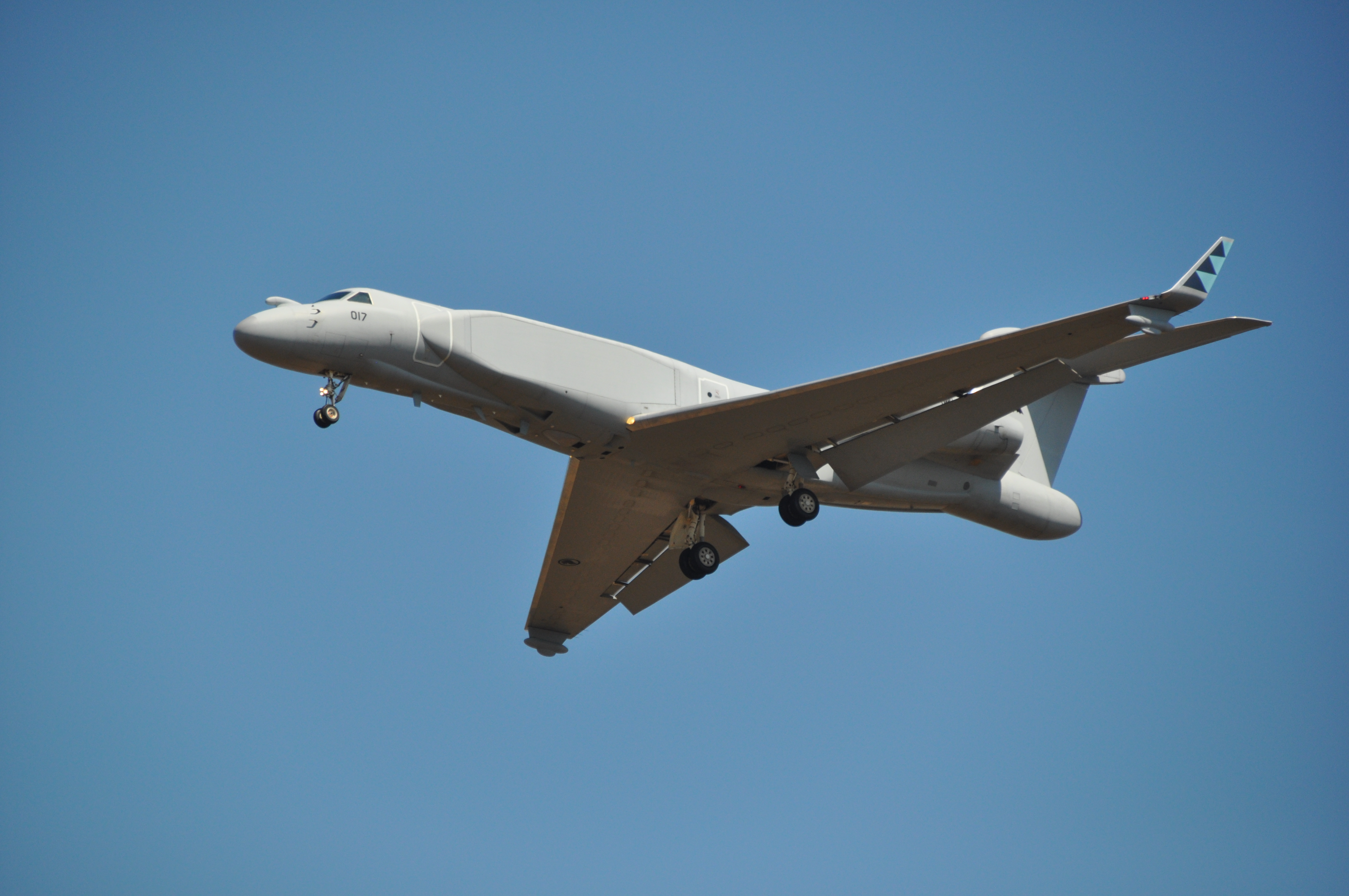
Republic of Singapore Air Force G550 with EL/W-2085 radar system

G550 CAEW
Israel has acquired a number of G550s, fitted with the EL/W-2085 sensor package (a newer derivative of the Phalcon system) for Airborne Early Warning (AEW) use and named the aircraft Eitam. This aircraft is heavily modified for the AEW role by Gulfstream's partner, Israel Aerospace Industries (IAI), and is also called CAEW (Conformal Airborne Early Warning) by Gulfstream Special Missions Department. Israel has also acquired a number of G550s dubbed SEMA (Special Electronic Missions Aircraft) with systems EL/I-3001 integration also carried out by IAI. In 2012, Italy acquired two G550 CAEWs as part of a counter-deal to Israel's $1 billion (~$1.35 billion in 2024) order for 30 Alenia Aermacchi M-346 advanced jet trainers. In 2022, Italy ordered two additional aircraft. Singapore ordered four similar G550 CAEW aircraft equipped with the EL/W-2085 sensor package from Gulfstream and IAI. L3Harris AERIS A is a similar platform using the G550.
E-550A
Italian military designation for the G550 CAEW
Air-to-air refueling variant
Israel Aerospace Industries has studied adapting the G550 for air-to-air refueling use.

== Operators ==
Gulfstream G550 government and military operators

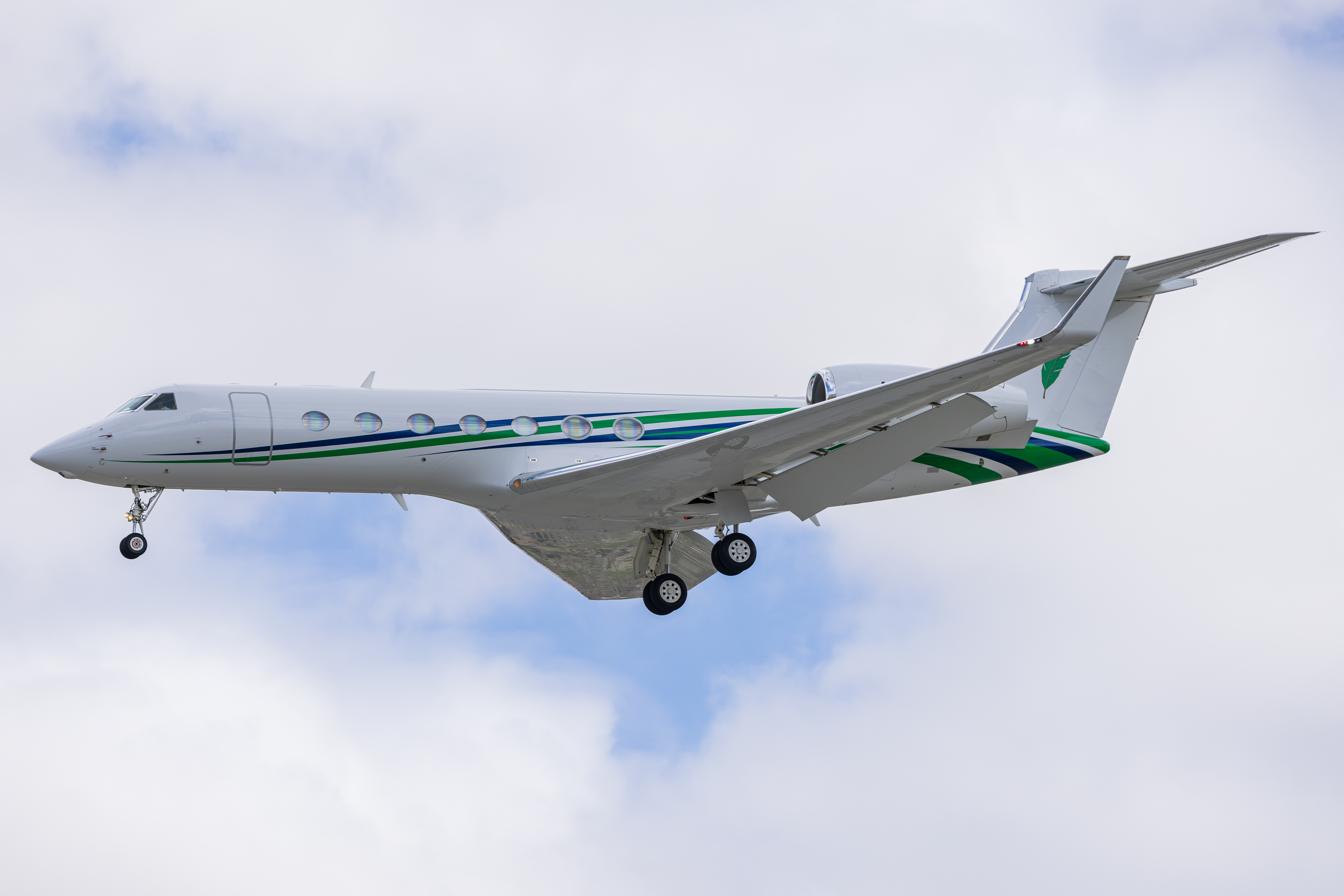
A civil-operated G550 landing at Palm Springs International Airport, 2023

The aircraft is operated by numerous governments, private individuals, companies and executive charter operators. A number of companies also use the aircraft as part of fractional ownership programs.

== Specifications ==
Gulfstream G500

Data from G550 Brochure

General characteristics

- Crew: 2 pilots, 0–2 attendants
- Capacity: 14–19 passengers / 6,200 lb (2,812 kg) payload

- Cabin dimensions: height × width × length 6 ft 2 in × 7 ft 4 in × 43 ft 11 in (1.88 m × 2.24 m × 13.39 m); total length including baggage hold: 50 ft 1 in (15.27 m)
- Cabin volume: 1,669 cu ft (47.26 m^{3}); usable baggage compartment volume: 170 cu ft (4.81 m^{3})
- Cabin altitude: 6,000 ft (1,829 m)

- Length: 96 ft 5 in (29.39 m)
- Wingspan: 93 ft 6 in (28.50 m)
- Height: 25 ft 10 in (7.87 m)
- Airfoil: root: NACA 0012; tip: NACA 0012
- Empty weight: 48,300 lb (21,909 kg)
- Gross weight: 54,500 lb (24,721 kg)
- Max takeoff weight: 91,000 lb (41,277 kg)
- Maximum landing weight: 75,300 lb (34,156 kg)
- Fuel capacity: 41,300 lb (18,733 kg)
- Powerplant: 2 × Rolls-Royce BR710 C4-11 turbofan engines, 15,385 lbf (68.44 kN) thrust each

Performance

- Range: 6,750 nmi (7,770 mi, 12,500 km)
- High Speed Cruise: M0.85 at 41,000 ft (12,000 m)
- Long Range Cruise: M0.80 at 41,000 ft (12,000 m)
- Maximum Mach Operating (MMO): M0.885 at 41,000 ft (12,000 m)
- Service ceiling: 51,000 ft (16,000 m)
- Take-off run: 5,910 ft (1,800 m)
- Landing run: 2,770 ft (840 m)

== See also ==
Related development

- Gulfstream G450
- Gulfstream G650
- Gulfstream V
- Hava SOJ

Aircraft of comparable role, configuration, and era

- Airbus Corporate Jets
- Boeing Business Jet
- Bombardier Global Express
- Dassault Falcon 7X
- Dassault Falcon 8X
