= Gulfstream G650/G700/G800 =

Executive jet aircraft

G650
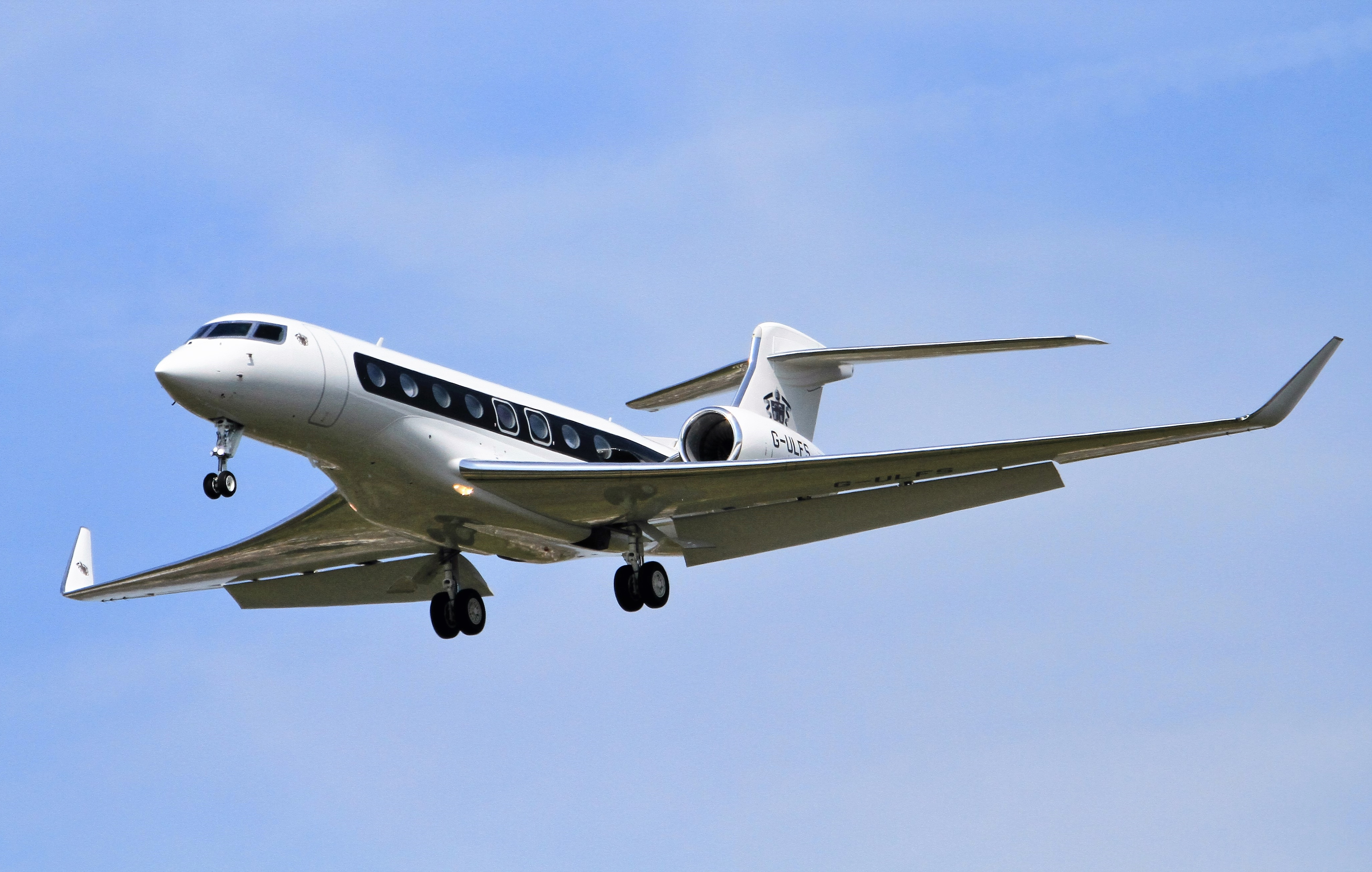
- Gulfstream Aerospace G650 with landing gear and flaps down on an approach

General information
- Type: Business jet
- National origin: United States
- Manufacturer: Gulfstream Aerospace
- Status: In production
- Number built: G650[ER]: 598; G700: 135 as of Oct. 2026; G800: 34 as of Oct. 2026

History
- Manufactured: G650[ER]: 2008–2025; G700: 2019–present G800: 2021–present
- First flight: G650: November 25, 2009; G700: February 14, 2020; G800: June 28, 2022

The Gulfstream G650, G700, and G800 are large business jets produced by Gulfstream Aerospace in the United States.

The G650 model is designated Gulfstream GVI in its type certificate. The aircraft can be configured to carry from 11 to 18 passengers over a range of 7,000 nautical miles [nmi] (13,000 km; 8,100 mi) at a top speed of Mach 0.925 (530.6 kn; 982.7 km/h; 610.6 mph). The aircraft is powered by two Rolls-Royce BR725 turbofans, mounted on the rear fuselage. Gulfstream began the G650 program in 2005 and revealed it to the public in 2008. The G650ER is an extended-range version of the G650, adding about 500 nmi (930 km; 580 mi) by modifying the fuel system, an upgrade offered for existing G650 aircraft.

At its introduction, the G650 was the company's largest and fastest business jet, until being surpassed by the G700. Introduced in October 2019, the G700 stretched the airframe by 10 feet (3.0 m) and increased its top speed to Mach 0.935 (536.3 kn; 993.3 km/h; 617.2 mph) using a new wing and improved Rolls-Royce Pearl 700 engines. A fourth variant, the G800 was announced in October 2021. The new aircraft is the same size as the G650 but uses the improved wing and Pearl 700 engines from the G700.

== Development ==
=== G650 ===
The Gulfstream G650 was formally launched as an internal company project in May 2005, and publicly unveiled on March 13, 2008. At the public announcement occasion, company executives stated the new model would become Gulfstream's largest, fastest and most expensive business jet on entry to the market.

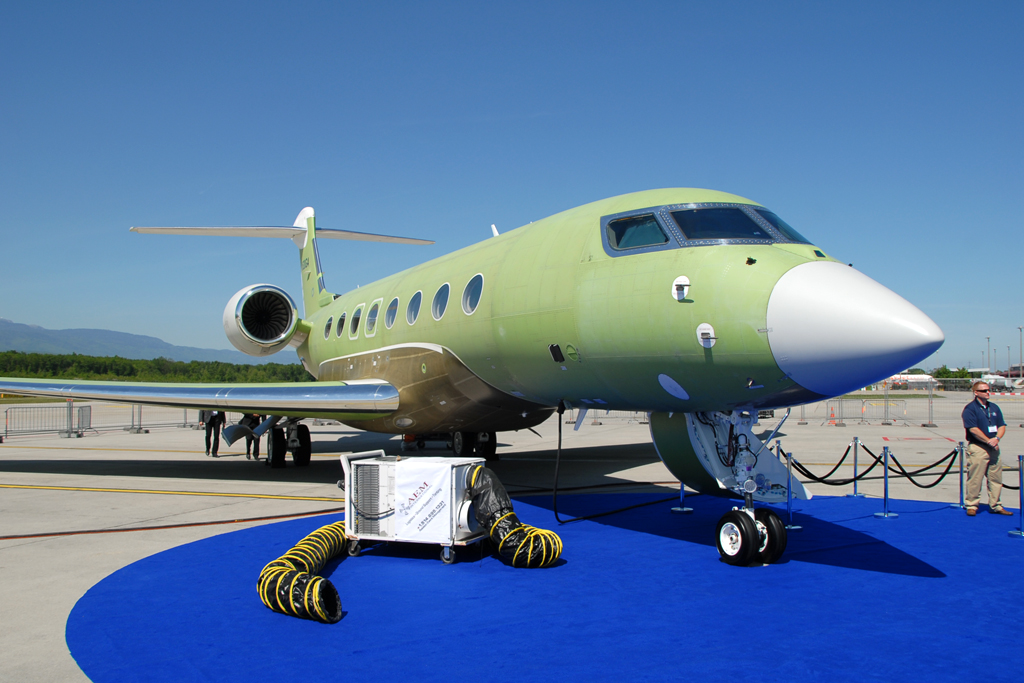
Unpainted G650 flight test prototype at EBACE 2012

The wing design was completed in 2006. A total of 1,400 hours of wind tunnel testing was completed by 2008. A pressure-test fuselage was built and tested, including an ultimate-pressure test of 18.37 psi (127 kPa).

The G650 taxied under its own power for the first time on September 26, 2009. A public rollout ceremony was held on September 29, 2009. The G650 had its maiden flight on November 25, 2009.

Flight testing for the maximum operating speed of Mach 0.925 was announced as completed on May 4, 2010. Gulfstream reported on August 26, 2010, that the G650 hit a maximum speed of Mach 0.995 during a dive as part of its 1,800-hour flight test program. In April 2011, a G650 crashed shortly after liftoff. The cause was determined to be related to the speeds carried out for the single engine takeoff run. The G650 test aircraft were grounded until May 28, 2011, when the remaining test aircraft were allowed to return to flight testing.

On September 7, 2012, the G650 received its type certificate from the US Federal Aviation Administration (FAA). Its first delivery was to an American customer, Preston Henn, on December 27, 2012.

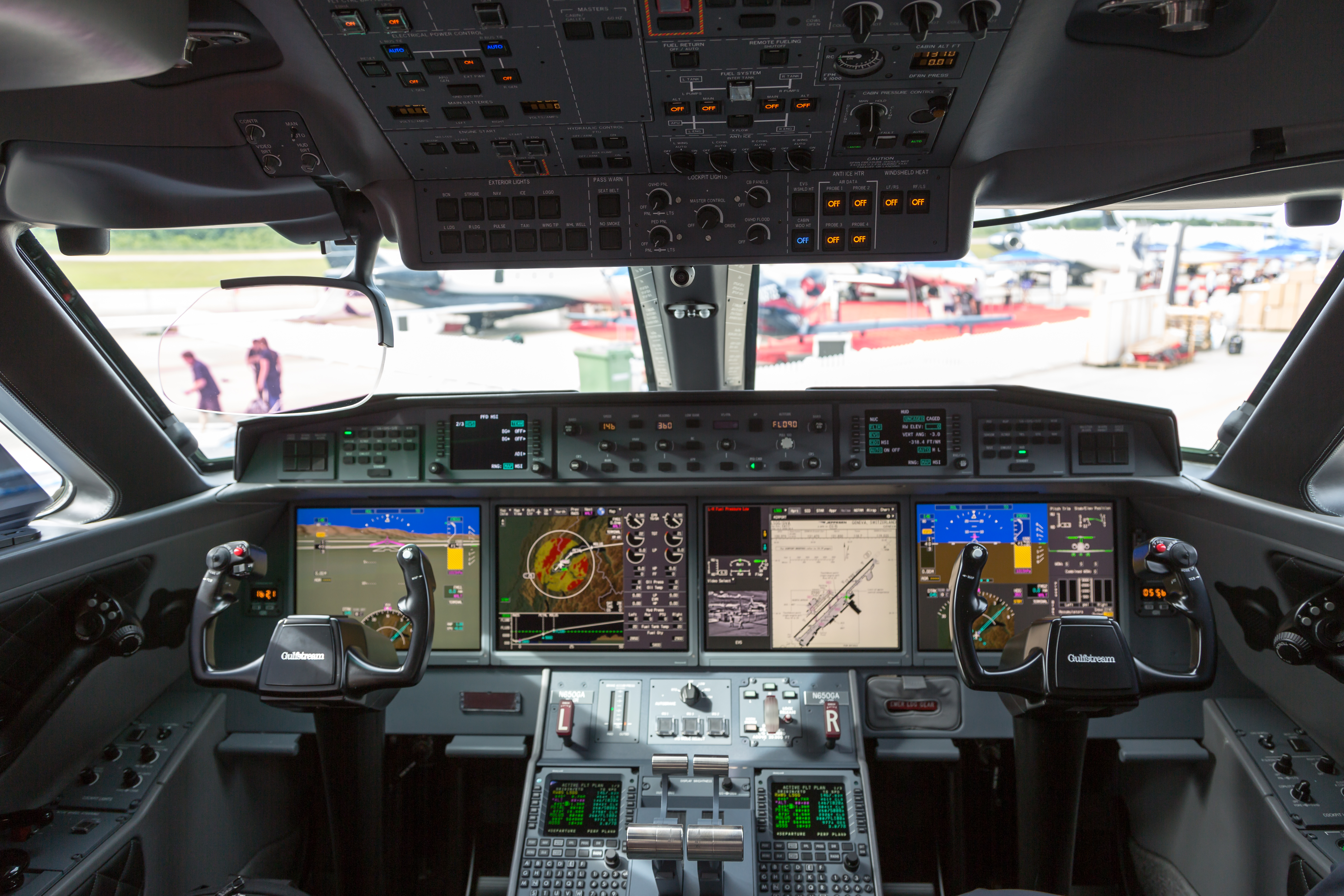
G650 cockpit

The G650 had a nominal list price of $64.5 million in 2013, but there was a three-year waiting list. Some aircraft produced for delivery in 2013 sold for more than $70 million to buyers that wanted to take immediate delivery.

After rising to $71–73 million in 2014, initial enthusiasm dissipated and the value of pre-owned G650s stabilized at $50 million after the competing Bombardier Global 7500 was certified in 2018.

Also in May 2014, Gulfstream confirmed that the G650 would be offered to the United States Air Force for its program to replace the E-8C JSTARS air-to-ground surveillance and targeting aircraft. The still emerging requirements call for an aircraft with a 10 to 13 man crew and a belly-mounted radar 12.8 to 19.7 ft (3.9 to 6.0 m) long. However, during the fiscal 2019 budget rollout briefing it was announced that the Air Force will not move forward with an E-8C replacement aircraft. Funding for the JSTARS recapitalization program will instead be diverted to pay for development of an advanced battle management system.

The G650 aircraft project was named the 2014 winner of the Collier Trophy, for having "strengthened business aviation through significant technological advancements in aircraft performance, cabin comfort, and safety."

In September 2018, Gulfstream was conducting testing at London City Airport to certify the aircraft to perform steep approaches. In 2023, its equipped price was $68.5M for the G650, and $70.5M for the G650ER.

The 300th G650 was delivered in April 2018, just over five years since introduction in December 2012. The 400th was delivered in December 2019, seven years after the type's introduction. The 500th was delivered by Gulfstream's Appleton completions facility in September 2022. In February 2025, the final G650 was completed; it is being replaced by the G800.

=== G650ER ===
On May 18, 2014, Gulfstream announced at the annual European Business Aviation Association exhibition, that it had developed an extended range version called the G650ER. The G650ER is capable of flying 7,500 nautical miles (13,900 km; 8,600 mi) at Mach 0.85, due to its 4,000-pound (1,800 kg) increase in fuel capacity. Gulfstream stated that in March a G650ER development aircraft had flown non-stop from Hong Kong to Teterboro, New Jersey in the United States, a distance of 7,494 nautical miles (13,879 km; 8,624 mi); it had also flown non-stop from Los Angeles to Melbourne in Australia. The extra fuel is housed in existing space inside the G650's wings and aircraft already built may be quickly upgraded to the ER version. The G650ER received its certification in October 2014 and began deliveries in late 2014. The G650ER attempted two world records from New York to Beijing to Savannah in February 2015. The same year, a G650ER set a new record for the longest non-stop flight by a purpose-built business jet, flying 8,010 nautical miles (14,835 km; 9,218 mi) from Singapore to Las Vegas with four passengers and crew. The record was surpassed by a Bombardier Global 7500 in March 2019, before the G650ER retook the record in April 2019 by flying 8,379 nmi (15,518 km) from Singapore to Tucson. Production on the G650 ended in February 2025, with it being replaced by the G800.

=== G700 ===
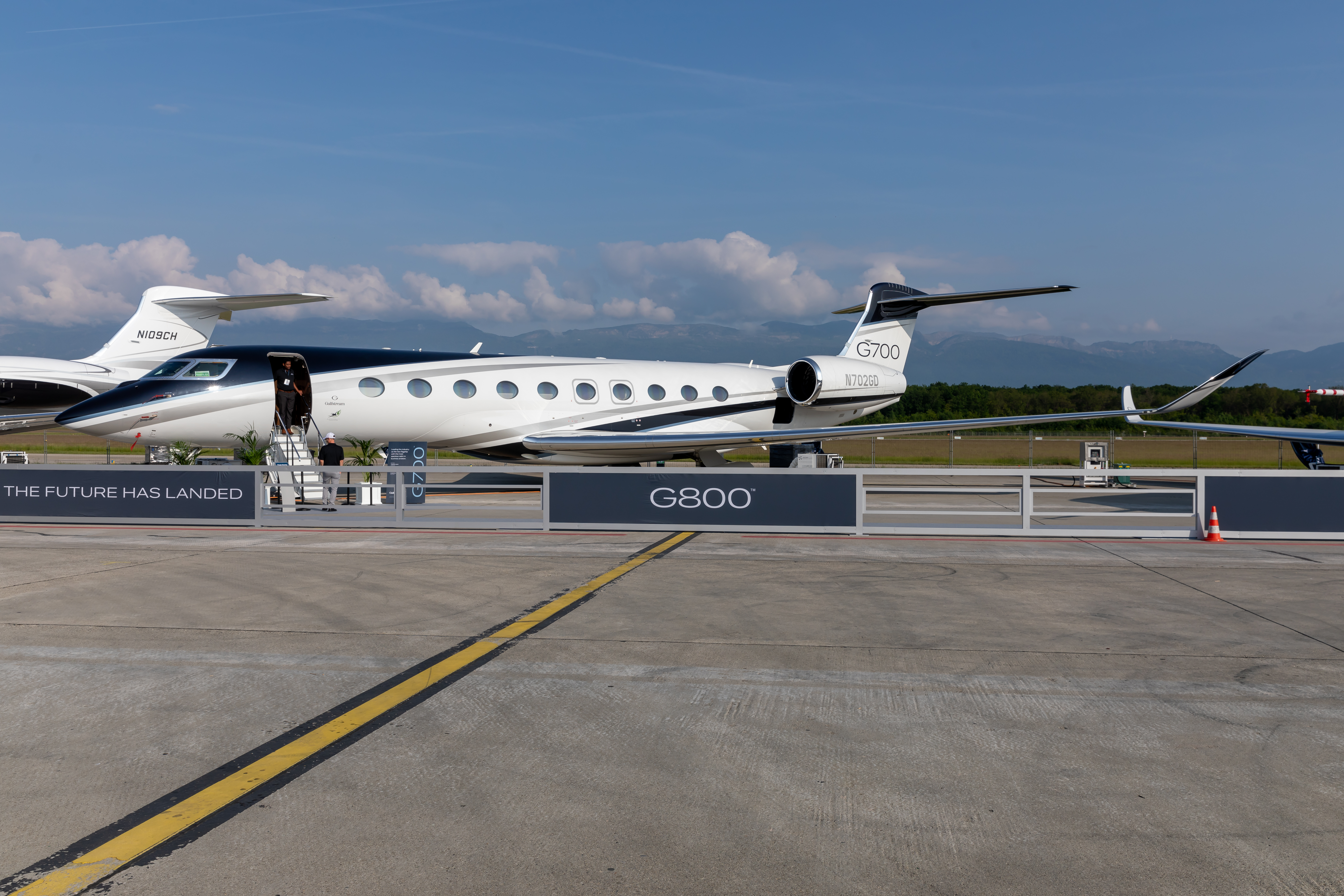
G700 at EBACE 2023

On the eve of the October 2019 NBAA Convention & Exhibition in Las Vegas, Gulfstream announced its new flagship, the G700, showing a video of the aircraft taxiing under its own power in Savannah. It should fly 7,500 nmi (8,600 mi; 13,900 km) at Mach 0.85 or 6,400 nmi (7,400 mi; 11,900 km) at Mach 0.90. Its longer cabin can accommodate up to five areas and has 20 windows. It is powered by Rolls-Royce Pearl 700 engines and has new winglets. Customer deliveries were originally planned to start in 2022. In July 2023, FAA approval was expected to be received in the autumn.

The $75 million jet is a 10 ft (3.0 m) stretch of the G650. The aircraft completed its first flight on February 14, 2020. The G700 should share its fly-by-wire cockpit with the G500/G600: active control sidesticks and Honeywell Primus Epic flight deck with synthetic and enhanced vision systems for a common type rating. The jet is 110 ft (34 m) long, about 10 ft (3 m) longer than the G650ER and about 1 ft (0.3 m) shorter than the competing Bombardier Global 7500. Its main cabin is 57 ft (17.4 m) long, 6.2 ft (1.9 m) high and 8.2 ft (2.5 m) wide; 2.6 ft (0.8 m) longer, 0.33 ft (0.1 m) wider and slightly taller than the 7500's cabin. It should carry 19 seated passengers or sleep 10. It will have a MTOW of 107,600 lb (48,800 kg) and the 18,250 lbf (81.2 kN) turbofans should burn 2–3% less fuel than the G650's R-R BR725s. The aircraft should need a 6,250 ft (1,905 m) runway at MTOW in ISA conditions at sea level and land in 2,500 ft (762 m) at a typical landing weight.

It has the same 1,283 sq ft (119.2 m^{2}) wing with its 33° wingsweep but the more outboard canted winglets are 3.4 ft (1.0 m) wider. The basic operating weight increases from 54,500 to 56,000 lb (24,700 to 25,400 kg) and the wet wing fuel capacity increases slightly by 1,200 lb (540 kg). The Pearl 700 turbofan is an improved version of the BR725, with one more low-pressure turbine stage, an overall pressure ratio over 50:1, and a bypass ratio higher than 6.5:1 for a 3–5% better thrust specific fuel consumption. After flight tests, G700 bested its competitor's 7,700 nmi (8,900 mi; 14,300 km) range and reached up to 7,800–8,000 nmi (9,000–9,200 mi; 14,400–14,800 km). The maximum operating speed of the G700 has increased from Mach 0.925 to Mach 0.935, ranking it as the fastest in the Gulfstream product line.

In 2023, its equipped price was $79.9M. The FAA issued its certificate on 29 March 2024, and the first two deliveries, to US-based customers, took place on 23 April 2024.

On April 23, 2024, Gulfstream began customer deliveries of its new G700 aircraft, less than a month after obtaining Federal Aviation Administration (FAA) certification. The first two G700s have begun service. The G700 was nominated for the 2024 Collier Trophy, ultimately awarded to the Parker Solar Probe.

In 2026, the Gulfstream G700 received certification from India's Directorate General of Civil Aviation, while Transport Canada approved both the G700 and G800 models, allowing them to operate and be registered in those markets.

=== G800 ===
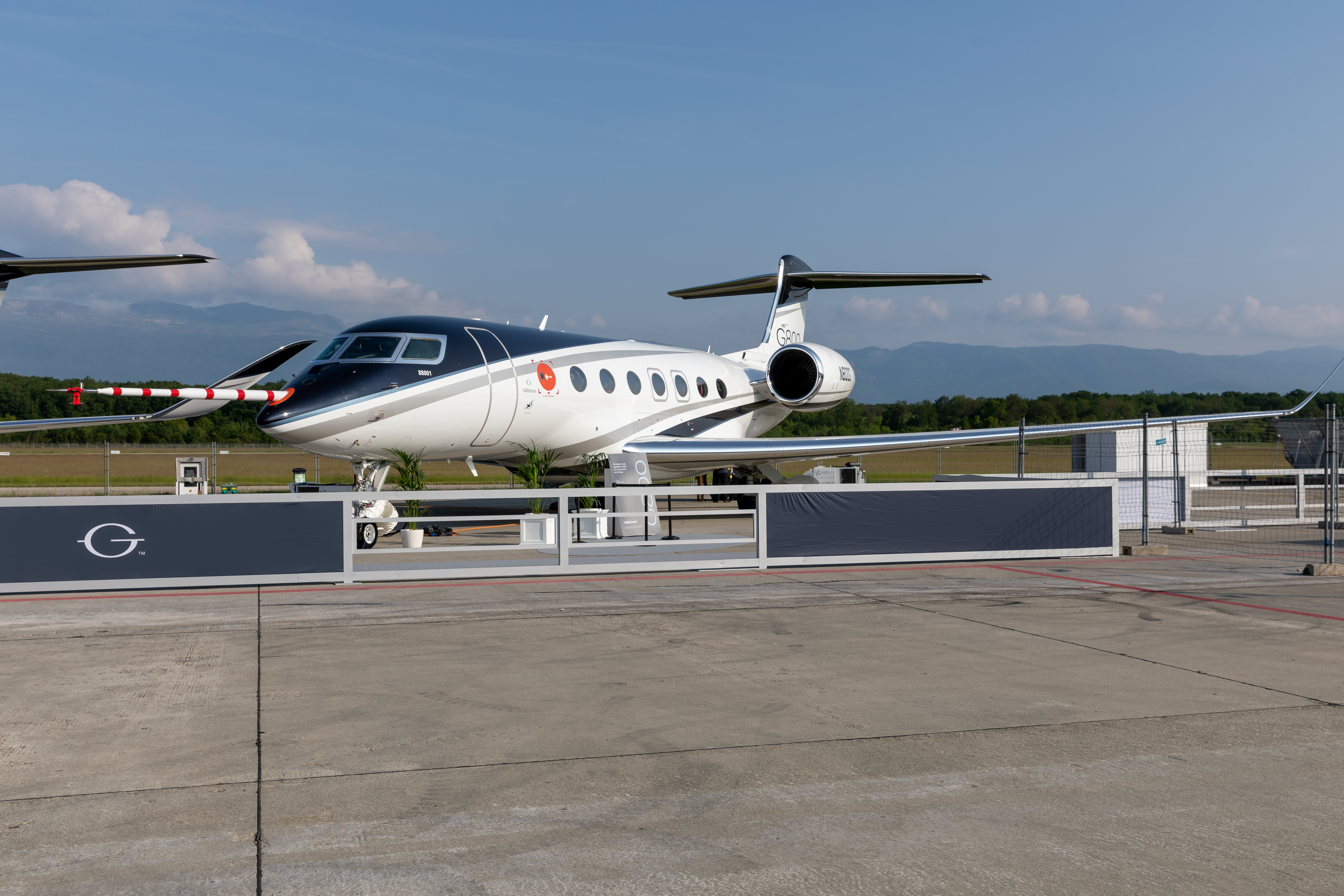
G800 prototype at 2023 EBACE

On October 4, 2021, Gulfstream unveiled in Savannah the Gulfstream G800, with the G700 wing and Pearl 700 engines, offering 8,000 nmi (14,800 km) range, four living areas, and 16 windows, with deliveries planned to begin in 2023.

Priced at $72.5 million, the G800 has a G650-size cabin, 10 ft (3.0 m) shorter than the G700's with two fewer windows per side. The G800 first flew on June 28, 2022 and FAA certification was expected in the first half of 2025. The G800 received FAA and EASA certification in April 2025, with the maximum range of 8,200 nmi (15,200 km) and maximum speed of Mach 0.935, increased from the original announcement. The first G800 was delivered in late August 2025.

On June 28, 2026 the G800 flew the longest great circle distance of any business aircraft travelling 8,303 nmi (15,377 km) from Melbourne, Australia, to Moline, Illinois. This did not exceed the total distance set by the G650ER which flew 8,379 nmi (15,518 km) from Singapore to Tucson in 2019 but represents a longer great circle distance of 15,325 km (Melbourne-Moline) versus 14,800 km (Singapore-Tucson).

== Design ==
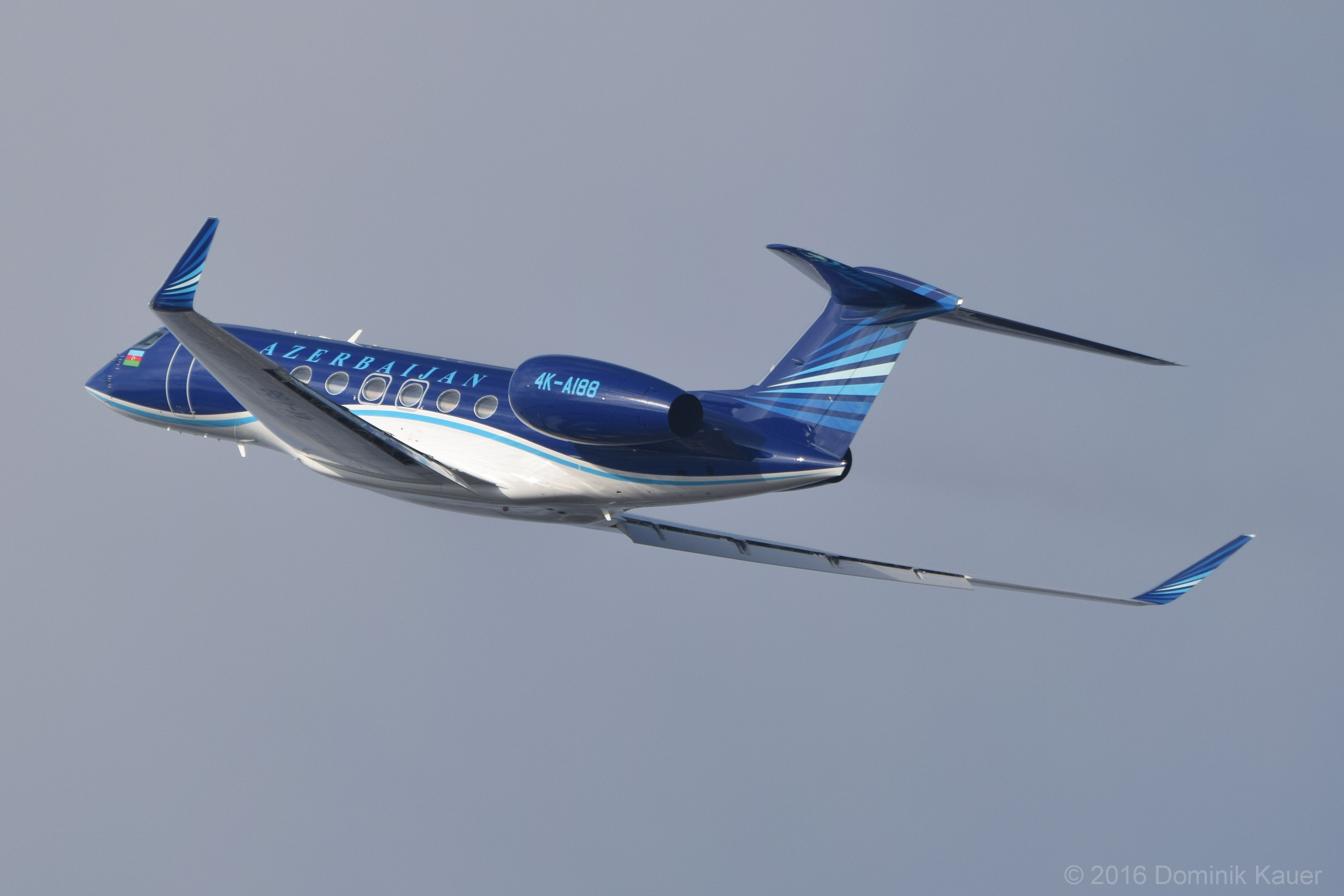
G650 on departure

The G650 has a cruise speed of Mach 0.85 to 0.90, with maximum speed of Mach 0.925 and a range of up to 7,000 nautical miles [nmi] (13,000 km; 8,100 mi). It can be equipped with a full kitchen and bar as well as a variety of entertainment features including satellite phones and wireless internet. The jet uses two Rolls-Royce BR725 engines, each producing a maximum thrust of 17,000 pounds-force (75.6 kN). Gulfstream has stated that with a weight of less than 100,000 pounds (45,400 kg), the G650 is able to land at small general aviation airports allowing passengers to avoid larger more busy airports.

To better use the main cabin space, Gulfstream designers rejected the usual circular fuselage cross-section in favor of an oval which uses a flatter lower portion. The cabin is 8 feet 6 inches (2.59 m) wide and 6 feet 3 inches (1.91 m) high, allowing the craft to be configured to carry between 11 and 18 passengers. The fuselage and wing are constructed mostly of metal while composite materials are used for the empennage, winglets, rear pressure bulkhead, engine cowlings, cabin floor structure and many fairings. The elliptical cabin windows, eight on each side of the fuselage, are 28 inches (71 cm) wide. Panels are bonded rather than riveted, reducing parts count compared to the G550.

The G650 wing has a sweep of 36 degrees which is greater than wings on previous Gulfstream aircraft like the G550 with a sweep of 27 degrees. It does not use leading-edge high-lift devices, and tracks for rear-mounted flaps are completely enclosed within the airfoil contour. The wing's leading edge is a continuously changing curve, and the airfoil varies continuously from root to tip. The aircraft also incorporates winglets.

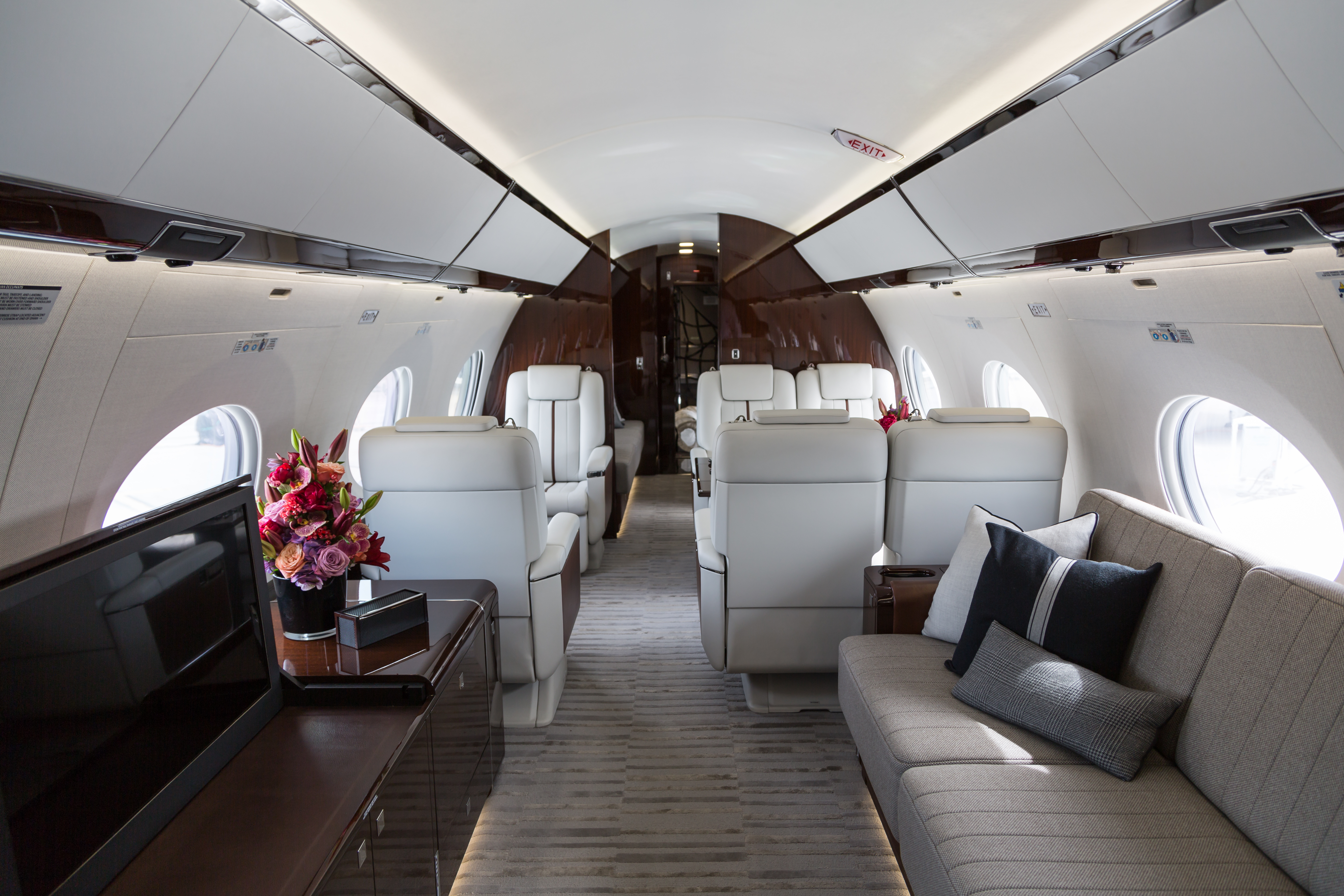
G650ER cabin

The aircraft controls are completely fly-by-wire, with no mechanical control between pilot and flight surfaces. The surfaces are moved by dual hydraulic systems. The G650 shares its yokes and column with the G550 in an effort to receive a common type rating. While most newer airliners now employ fly-by-wire technology, the G650 was only the second fly-by-wire business jet, after the Dassault Falcon 7X and before the Embraer Legacy 500.

At FL 470 and ISA-7°C, it cruises at Mach 0.85 or 480 kn (550 mph; 890 km/h) TAS and burns 2,400 lb (1,100 kg) per hour at a weight of 67,500 lb (30,600 kg), increasing to 3,000 lb (1,400 kg) per hour at Mach 0.90 or 506 kn (582 mph; 937 km/h) TAS.

The G700's flight deck is upgraded to the Symmetry flight deck from the G500/G600.

== Variants ==
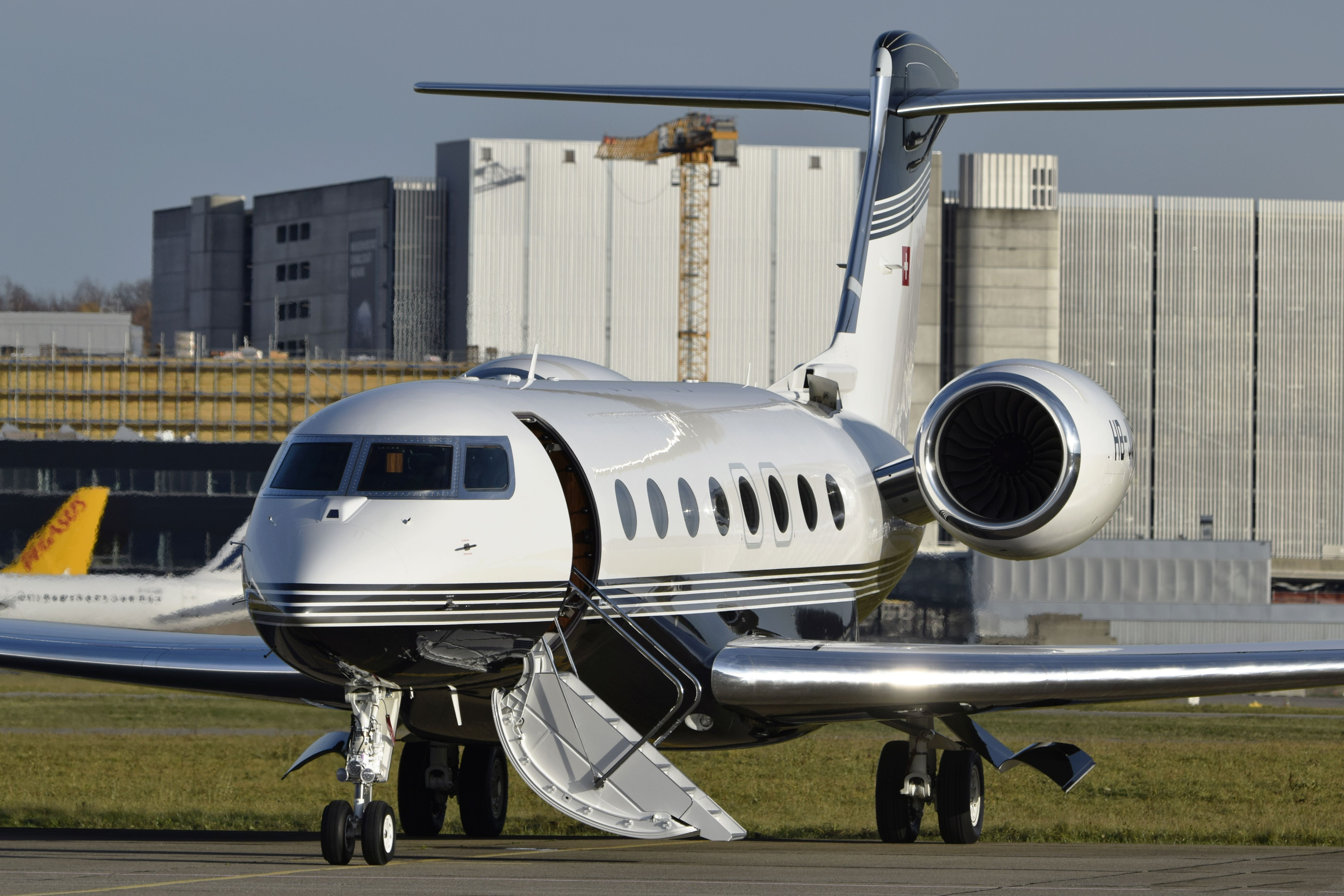
Gulfstream 650 with stairs open

G650
Initial production version

G650ER
Extended Range version, with maximum takeoff weight increased by 4,000 pounds (1,800 kg) and an equivalent increase in fuel capacity; capable of flying 7,500 nautical miles (13,900 km; 8,600 mi) at Mach 0.85. Fuel capacity of the wet wings is increased by a modification to the fuel system, through a service bulletin; the modification is available as a $2 million retrofit for existing G650 aircraft. The list price for a new G650ER aircraft was $66.5 million in 2014.

G700
Announced in October 2019, the aircraft is stretched by 10 ft 1 in (3.07 m) for a longer cabin with five areas and ten windows per side, up from eight. The engines are 2–3% more efficient 18,250 lbf (81.2 kN) Rolls-Royce Pearl 700 turbofans. The aircraft has a 4,000 lb (1,800 kg) heavier MTOW than the G650ER for the same 7,500 nmi (13,900 km; 8,600 mi) range.

G800
Announced in October 2021, the aircraft is slated to replace the G650.

== Operators ==
These aircraft are operated by private individuals, companies, governments, charter operators and fractional ownership companies.

=== Civil ===
Qatar Executive

- Operates 15 G650ERs and 10 G700s.

Flexjet

- Operates over two dozen G650s and five G700s.

=== Government and Military ===
Italy

- Italian Air Force: Operates four G650ERs.

Netherlands

- Royal Netherlands Air and Space Force: Operates one G650ER.

United States

- United States Coast Guard: Operates one G700 with a second on order.

Zambia

- Zambian Air Force: Operates one G650.

== Incidents and accidents ==
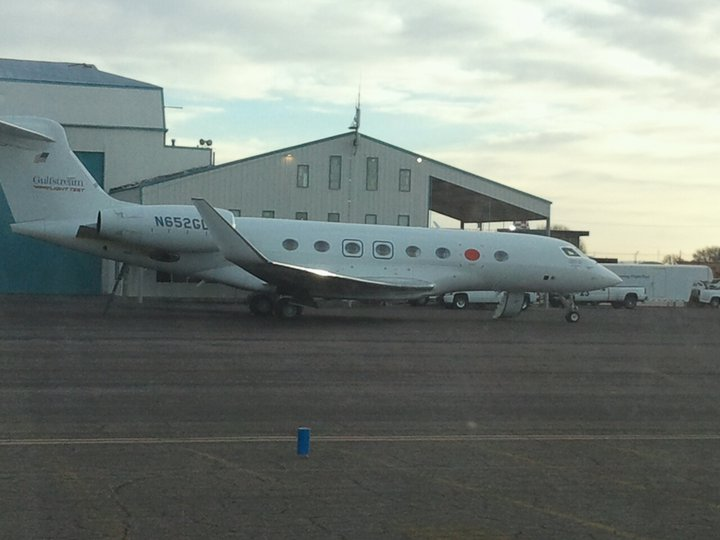
N652GD, the aircraft involved, photographed in March 2011

On April 2, 2011, the second G650 test aircraft crashed during takeoff from the Roswell International Air Center, New Mexico, killing the four Gulfstream employees on board (two pilots and two test engineers). The aircraft was conducting a takeoff-performance test during which an engine failure was simulated by reducing the right engine's thrust to idle. The G650 became airborne briefly at a high angle of attack before its right wingtip hit the runway; then it slid on the ground, struck a concrete berm, and caught fire.

The National Transportation Safety Board (NTSB) determined the probable cause of the crash was an aerodynamic stall of the aircraft, due to a failure to properly develop and validate takeoff speeds involving persistent and increasingly aggressive attempts to achieve a V2 speed that was too low. It found that Gulfstream's investigation of the two previous uncommanded roll events was inadequate. Following the crash, Gulfstream raised the V2 speed of the G650 from 135 knots (155 mph; 250 km/h) to 150 knots (170 mph; 280 km/h). The NTSB accused Gulfstream of withholding information, which the company denied. The NTSB also objected to Gulfstream's use of legal counsel during the investigation.

== Specifications ==
Model	G650	G650ER	G700	G800
Cockpit crew	2			
Capacity	19			
Length	99 ft 9 in (30.40 m)		109 ft 10 in (33.48 m)	99 ft 9 in (30.40 m)
Wingspan	99 ft 7 in (30.35 m)		103 ft (31 m)	
Height	25 ft 8 in (7.82 m)		25 ft 5 in (7.75 m)	25 ft 6 in (7.77 m)
Cabin length	46 ft 10 in (14.27 m)		56 ft 11 in (17.35 m)	46 ft 10 in (14.27 m)
Cabin cross section	Height: 6 ft 3 in (1.91 m), width: 8 ft 2 in (2.49 m)			
Cabin volume	2,138 cu ft (60.5 m^{3})		2,603 cu ft (73.7 m^{3})	2,138 cu ft (60.5 m^{3})
Baggage volume	195 cu ft (5.5 m^{3})			
Maximum takeoff weight (MTOW)	99,600 lb (45,200 kg)	103,600 lb (47,000 kg)	107,600 lb (48,800 kg)	105,600 lb (47,900 kg)
Basic operating weight (BOW) (Note: includes four crew members)	54,000 lb (24,000 kg)		56,365 lb (25,567 kg)	54,300 lb (24,600 kg)
Maximum payload	6,500 lb (2,900 kg)		6,385 lb (2,896 kg)	6,200 lb (2,800 kg)
Fuel capacity	44,200 lb (20,000 kg)	48,200 lb (21,900 kg)	49,400 lb (22,400 kg)	
Fuel consumption per hour	500 US gal (1,900 L; 420 imp gal)	503 US gal (1,900 L; 419 imp gal)	509 US gal (1,930 L; 424 imp gal)	
Turbofans (x2)	Rolls-Royce BR725		Rolls-Royce Pearl 700	
Takeoff thrust (x2)	16,900 lbf (75.2 kN)		18,250 lbf (81.2 kN)	
Range (Note: At Mach 0.85, 8 pax, 4 crew, NBAA IFR reserves)	7,000 nmi (13,000 km; 8,100 mi)	7,500 nmi (13,900 km; 8,600 mi)	7,750 nmi (14,350 km; 8,920 mi)	8,200 nmi (15,200 km; 9,400 mi)
Cruise speed	Mach 0.85 – Mach 0.90 (488–516 kn; 903–956 km/h; 561–594 mph)			
Max. operating speed, M_{MO}	Mach 0.925 (531 kn; 983 km/h; 611 mph)		Mach 0.935 (536 kn; 993 km/h; 617 mph)	
Takeoff distance (SL, ISA, MTOW)	5,858 ft (1,786 m)	6,299 ft (1,920 m)	6,250 ft (1,905 m)	5,812 ft (1,771 m)
Ceiling	51,000 ft (15,545 m)			

== See also ==
Related development

- Gulfstream G550
- Gulfstream G500/G600

Aircraft of comparable role, configuration, and era

- Bombardier Global Express
- Bombardier Global 7500/8000
- Dassault Falcon 7X
- Dassault Falcon 8X
- Dassault Falcon 10X
