= Dahlewitz =

Coordinates: 52°19′20″N 13°26′22″E

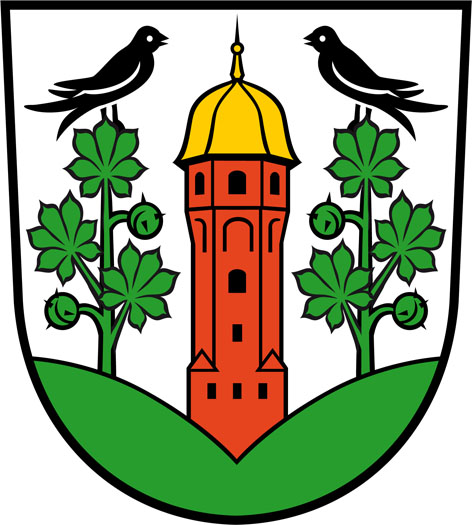
Dahlewitz coat of arms

Dahlewitz is a village on the southern outskirts of Berlin, Germany, just north of the Route 10 autobahn. Since October 2003, Dahlewitz has been part of the Blankenfelde-Mahlow municipality, in the district of Teltow-Fläming. Near Dahlewitz there is the Berlin Brandenburg Airport.

== History ==
Archaeological work carried out between 2006 and 2009 in the area has uncovered evidence of tombs dating back to the fifth and sixth centuries BC, as well as Bronze Age, Iron Age and Roman artefacts.

The village was founded in the 13th century, and in 1522 became the home of the Otterstedt family. The construction of the railway line between Berlin and Dresden in 1875 led to the building of Dahlewitz railway station in 1884.

In 1990, following German reunification, BMW Rolls-Royce decided to set up an aeroengine technical centre adjacent to the autobahn. In 2000, the company was renamed Rolls-Royce Deutschland, after BMW sold its share to Rolls-Royce.
