= External vision system =

An external vision system (XVS) refers to any of several methods to provide the pilot of an aircraft with a means to see outside the aircraft where traditional windscreens may not be feasible due to the aircraft configuration. An XVS would consist of external sensors, primarily video imagery, which is provided to the pilot(s) in real time via one or more displays intended to augment or replace the windscreen.

In recent years, other types of vision systems have been introduced primarily on business jets. Both enhanced vision systems (EVS) and synthetic vision system (SVS) have become standard equipment on many larger business jets such as those manufactured by Gulfstream, Bombardier, Dassault, and most recently, Embraer. However, EVS typically provides the pilot(s) with an infrared video image, usually displayed on the head-up display (HUD), which overlays the pilot view of the outside world through the windscreen. SVS is a computer generated version of the outside world created from an onboard terrain database. SVS can also be displayed conformally on the HUD, but it is not real time in that anything that is not part of the static terrain database cannot be displayed.

Both EVS and SVS are primarily intended to improve situational awareness of the flight deck crew, especially at night and in poor visibility weather conditions such as rain, snow, fog, or smoke. XVS is different in that it is intended to provide the flight deck crew a real time view of the outside world in visual meteorological conditions (VMC).

== Research Efforts ==
NACA and later NASA conducted several flight experiments with onboard video systems in the late 1950s and 1960s. Renewed interest in XVS came again when civil supersonic transport aircraft such as the Concorde. Supersonic aircraft typically have long, protruding noses to reduce drag at high speeds. This creates a problem for designers who then may not be able to incorporate large enough windows to allow pilots the required view of the outside world. The solution on the Concorde was to have an articulating nose that drooped, exposing larger windows and allowing the pilots a better view during taxi, takeoff, approach, and landing. However, the structural and mechanism weight penalty for a solution similar to that used on the Concorde is undesirable and thus designers began looking for other solutions.

During the High Speed Civil Transport (HSCT) program, NASA and its industry partners began looking at an early XVS for use on a proposed US supersonic civil transport. XVS was again proposed on the follow-on High Speed Research (HSR) program.

In 2008, following the Quiet Spike supersonic research program, NASA and Gulfstream again collaborated on an XVS flight demonstration program using NASA's TF-18 flight test aircraft using commercial off-the-shelf High Definition video cameras and video displays while artificially restricting the aft seat pilot's view of the outside world.

As a follow-on research project, NASA Langley Research Center equipped a test aircraft with multiple HD cameras and displays to provide resolution nearly equivalent to "20/20" human visual acuity.

== See also ==
- Index of aviation articles
- Aircraft periscope
- Telescopic Sighting System
- TISEO
