= Rockwell HiMAT =

Experimental American aircraft design

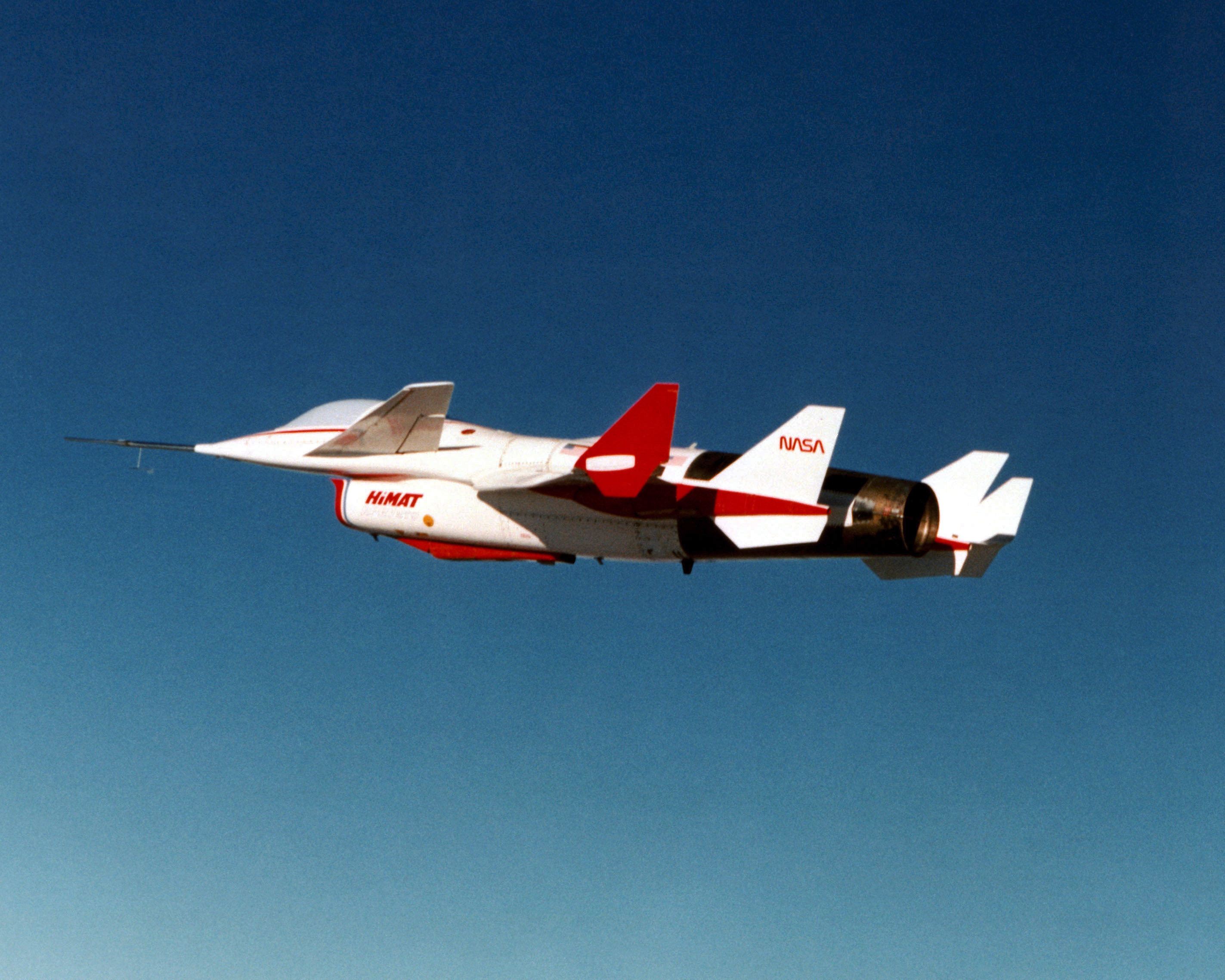
- HiMAT in flight

General information
- Type: Experimental remotely piloted aircraft
- National origin: United States
- Manufacturer: Rockwell International
- Status: On display
- Primary user: NASA
- Number built: 2

History
- Manufactured: 1975-1979
- First flight: July 27, 1979
- Retired: January 1983

The Rockwell RPRV-870 HiMAT (Highly Maneuverable Aircraft Technology) is an experimental remotely piloted aircraft that was produced for a NASA program to develop technologies for future fighter aircraft. Among the technologies explored were close-coupled canards, fully digital flight control (including propulsion), composite materials (graphite and fiberglass), remote piloting, synthetic vision systems, winglets, and others.

Two aircraft were produced by Rockwell International. Their first flights took place in 1979, and testing was completed in 1983. The aircraft was flown 26 times.

== Design and development ==
The HiMATs were remotely piloted, as the design team decided that it would be cheaper and safer to not risk a pilot's life during the experiments. This also meant that no ejection seat would have to be fitted. The aircraft was flown by a pilot in a remote cockpit, and control signals up-linked from the flight controls in the remote cockpit on the ground to the aircraft, and aircraft telemetry downlinked to the remote cockpit displays. The remote cockpit could be configured with either nose camera video or with a 3D synthetic vision display called a "visual display".

The aircraft were launched from a B-52 Stratofortress at altitude. There was also a TF-104G Starfighter chase plane with a set of backup controls which could take control of the HiMAT in the event that the remote pilot on the ground lost control. The HiMAT was created using graphite-epoxy composites, which were just as strong as their metal counterparts but also lighter and more flexible.

Advances in digital flight control gained during the project contributed to the Grumman X-29 experimental aircraft, and composite construction are used widely on both commercial and military aircraft.

The aircraft's initial concept included a wedge-shaped exhaust nozzle with 2D thrust vectoring.

== Operational history ==
The HiMAT was first revealed to the public in March 1978, where it was shown to a select group of VIPs and media. Shortly after the reveal, the aircraft was loaded onto a flatbed and taken to the Armstrong Flight Research Center, where the flight test program would be carried out. The second HiMAT aircraft arrived at the Armstrong Flight Research Center on June 15th.

On March 16, 1978, the first HiMAT, known as RPRV (Remotely Piloted Research Vehicle) 870 underwent its first fit check with the NB-52 Stratofortress. The NB-52 used the same method that was used to fit the X-15, with the addition of a purpose-built adapter for fitting the HiMAT. The first captive flight test of the HiMAT, which was scheduled for July 11, 1979, had to be aborted due to issues with the telemetry and aircraft systems. It was instead conducted on July 20, and after this test the first free flight was scheduled for the next week.

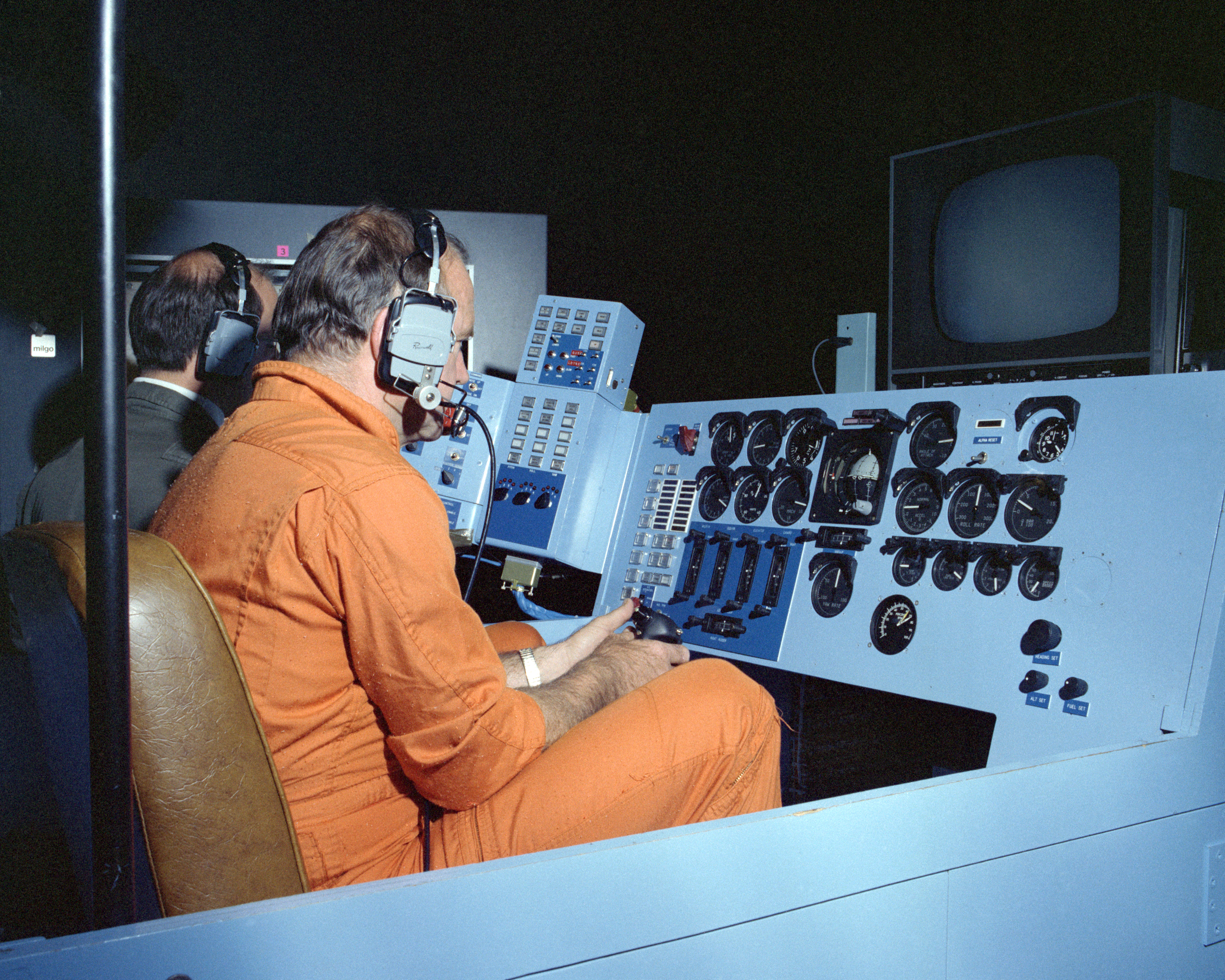
Willam Dana in the HiMAT remote cockpit

The first flight test of the HiMAT was conducted on July 27, 1979, with NASA test pilot William H. Dana controlling it from the ground. The aircraft met its objectives for the flight and landed successfully near the Edwards Air Force Base. Testing continued without issues until the HiMAT's fifth flight on July 8, 1980, where the ground pilot lost control of the aircraft and control of the HiMAT was given to the backup pilot in the TF-104G Starfighter. A software glitch stopped the HiMAT from deploying its landing skids and so the aircraft performed an emergency belly landing near Edwards Air Force Base. The HiMAT sustained minor damage which was repaired and the aircraft began to fly again on October 10th.

The second HiMAT, RPRV 871, underwent its first captive flight on June 25, 1981. RPRV 871's first free flight took place on July 24, and on February 18, 1982, performed the first 8G manoeuvre for the HiMAT. RPRV 871 also performed the first supersonic HiMAT flight, reaching a speed of Mach 1.2 on May 11. On its next flight on May 14, RPRV reached a speed of Mach 1.45.

RPRV 870 made its final flight on August 17, 1982, and RPRV 871 made its final flight on January 12, 1983. They flew 14 and 12 times respectively. The average time for each flight was approximately 30 minutes. RPRV 870 had flown for 11 hours and 35 minutes and RPRV 871 had flown for 10 hours and 57 minutes.

== Aircraft on display ==
The two HiMAT aircraft are now on display, one at the National Air and Space Museum and the other at the Armstrong Flight Research Center.

== Specifications ==
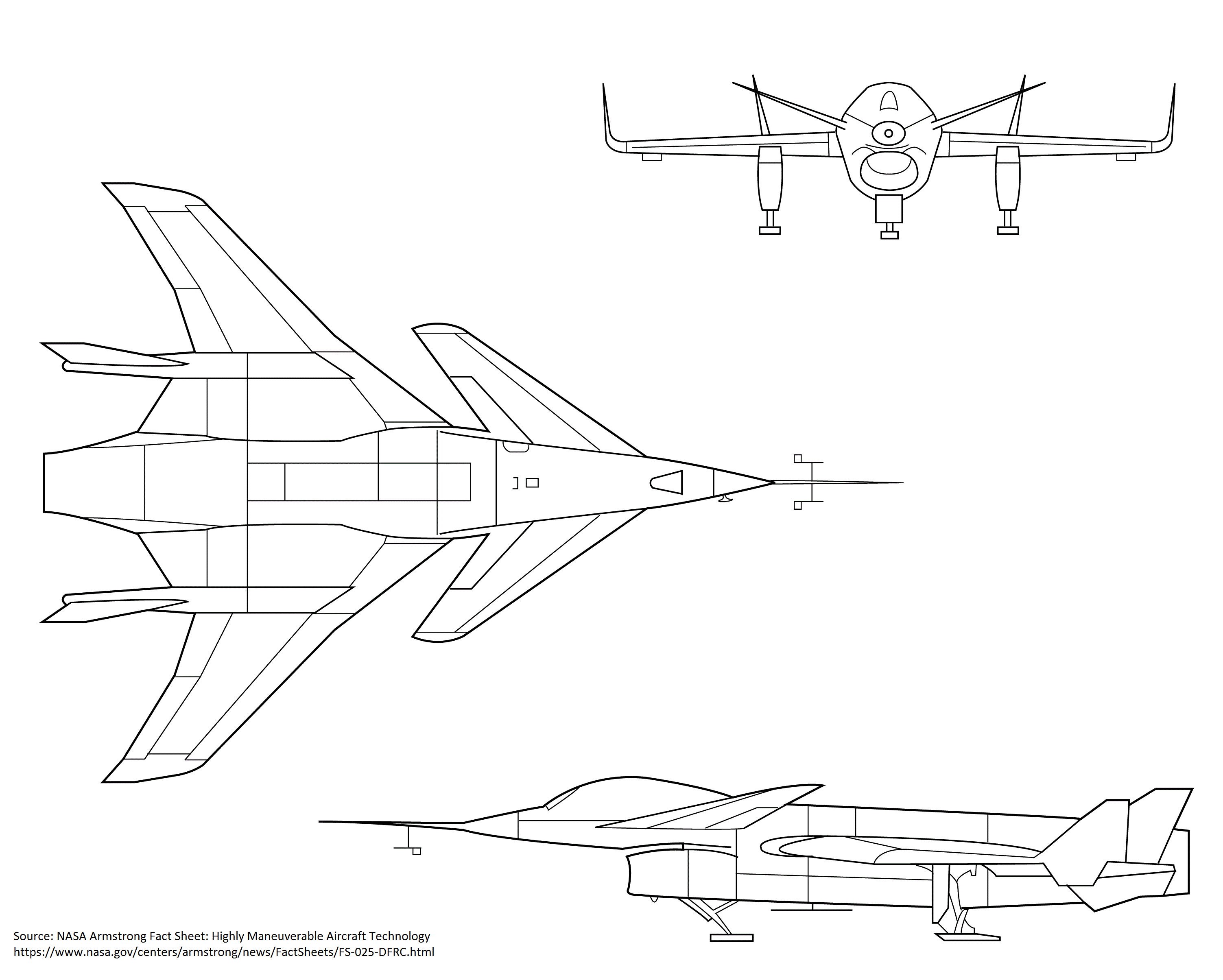

Data from Boeing.com

General characteristics

- Crew: None
- Length: 22 ft 6 in (6.86 m)
- Wingspan: 15 ft 7 in (4.75 m)
- Height: 4 ft 4 in (1.31 m)
- Empty weight: 3,370 lb (1,529 kg)
- Gross weight: 4,030 lb (1,828 kg)
- Powerplant: 1 × General Electric J85-GE-21 turbojet

Performance

- Maximum speed: 1,218 mph (1,960 km/h, 1,058 kn)
- Maximum speed: Mach 1.6

== Gallery ==
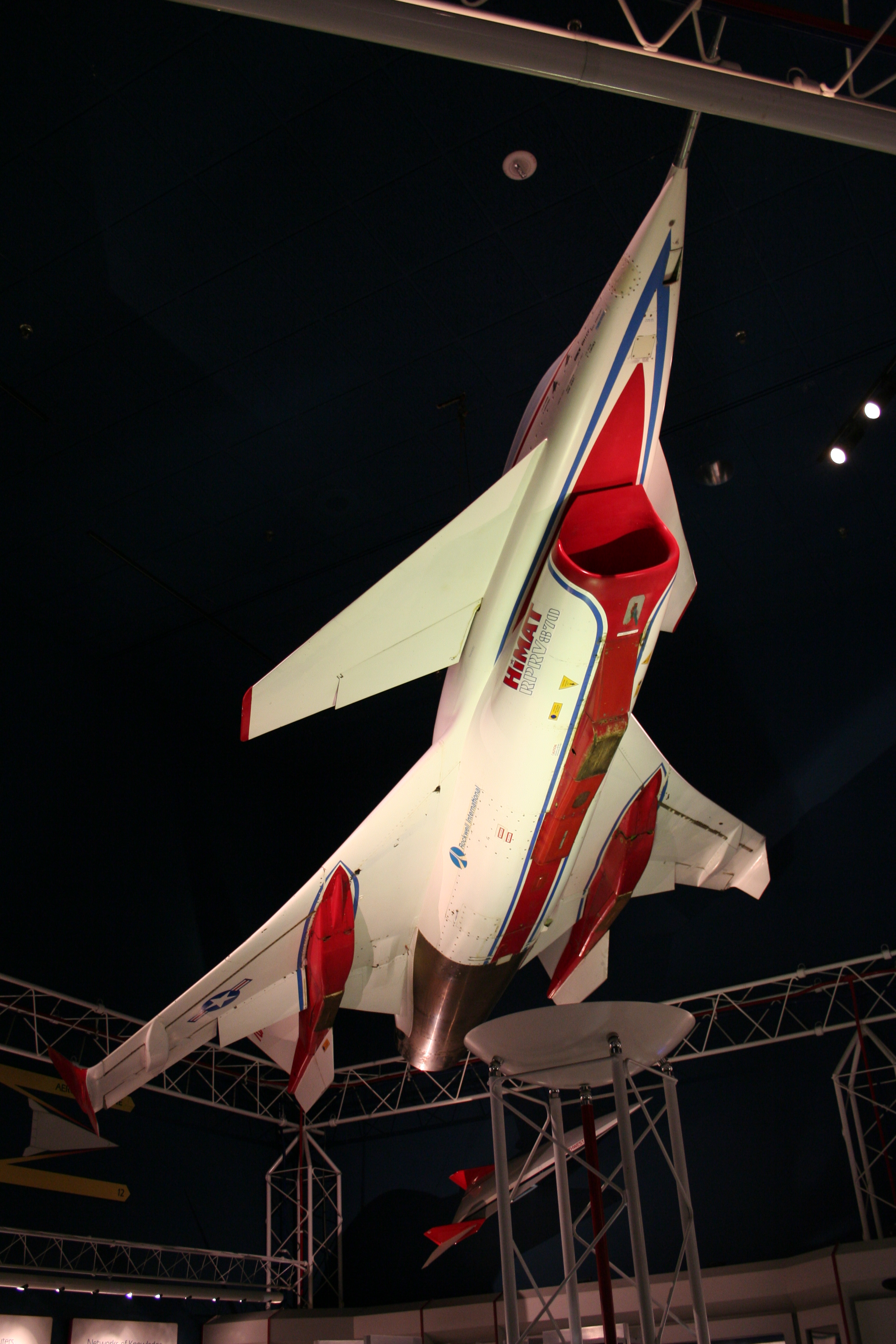
HiMAT aircraft at the National Air and Space Museum

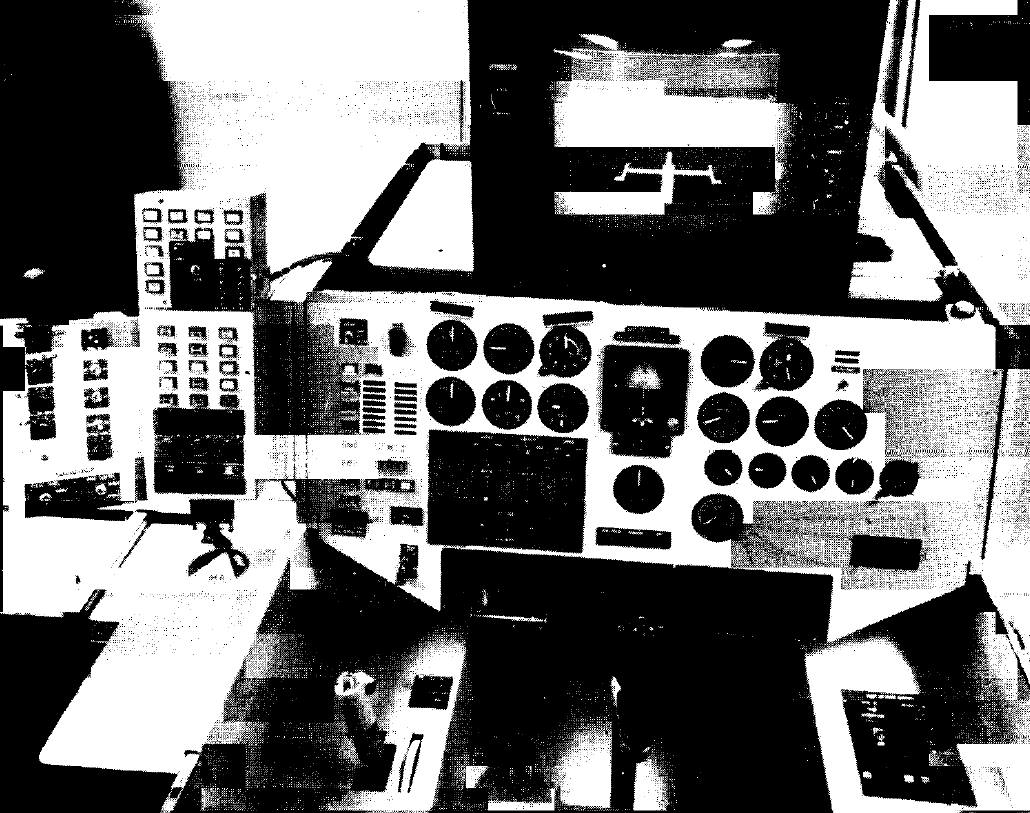
HiMAT Remote Cockpit with Synthetic Vision Display

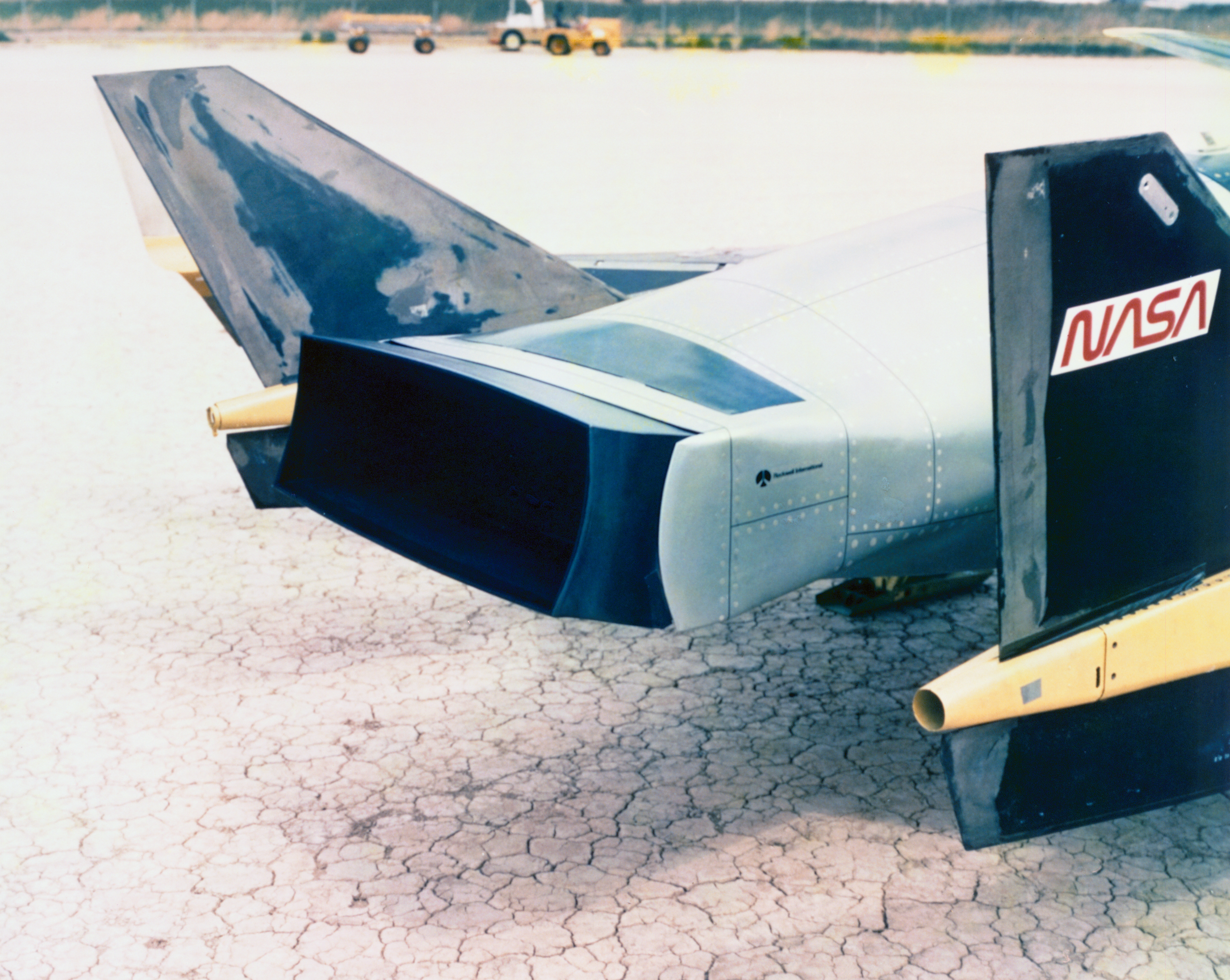
Initial mockup of HiMAT with two dimensional thrust vectoring

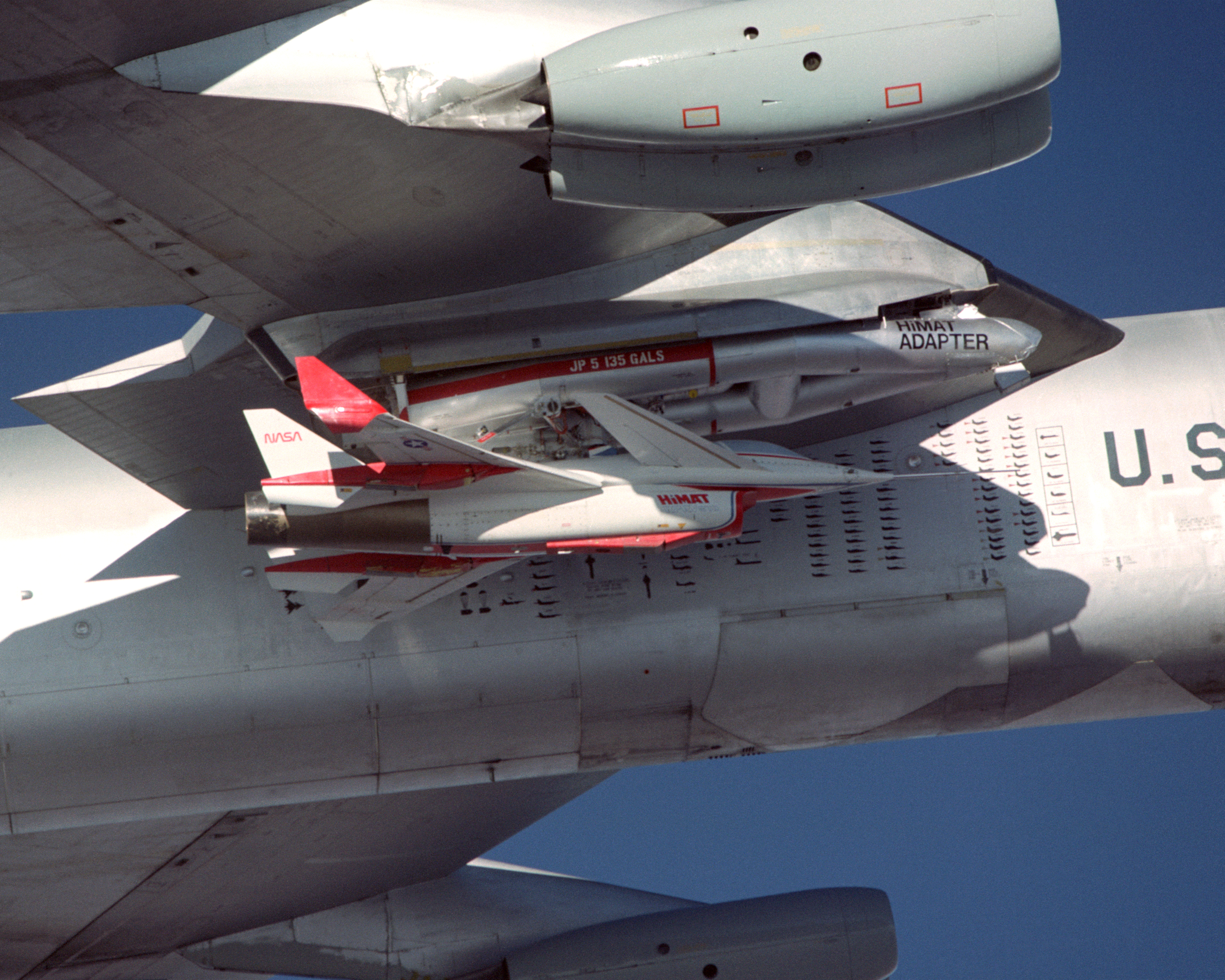
A HiMAT aircraft mated to an NB-52 Stratofortress mothership aircraft

== See also ==
- List of experimental aircraft
- Grumman X-29
- Rockwell-MBB X-31
- McDonnell Douglas X-36
- NASA X-38
