= Telescopic Sighting System =

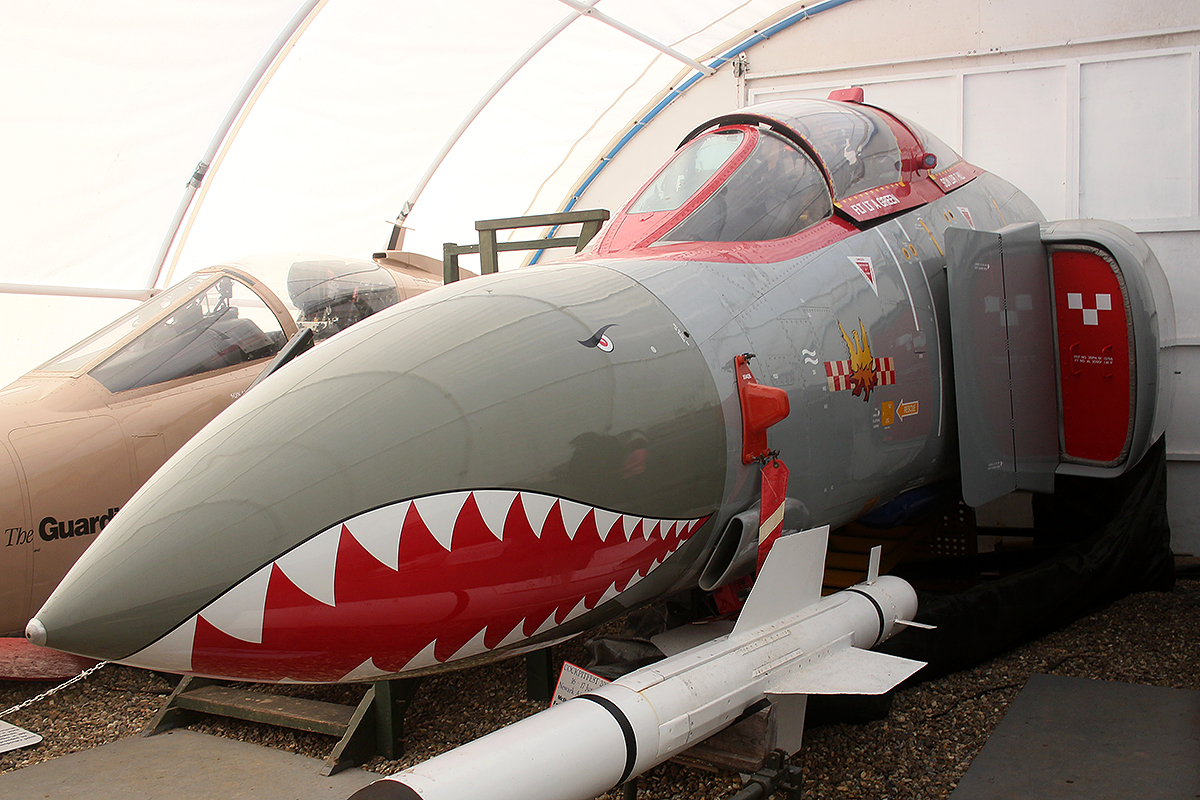
TESS (TElescopic Sighting System) panel mounted periscope between front and rear cockpit on a Royal Air Force F-4 Phantom II

The Telescopic Sighting System (TESS) was a sight used on the FV4201 Chieftain tank and RAF F-4 Phantom aircraft.

== Usage ==
The TESS was trialed and introduced in the early 1980s originally as a tank sight for the FV4201 Chieftain. Surplus stocks were used on F-4 Phantom aircraft operated by the Royal Air Force as a cost-saving measure for a long range daytime target identification device, whereas the United States Air Force used the TISEO on their F-4 Phantoms. The TESS was installed in the rear cockpit in the centre window section for the Radar Intercept Officer to use. It was boresighted to the aircraft weapons system and when locked on target, the target was magnified six times.

== See also ==
- Aircraft periscope
