= Target Identification System Electro-Optical =

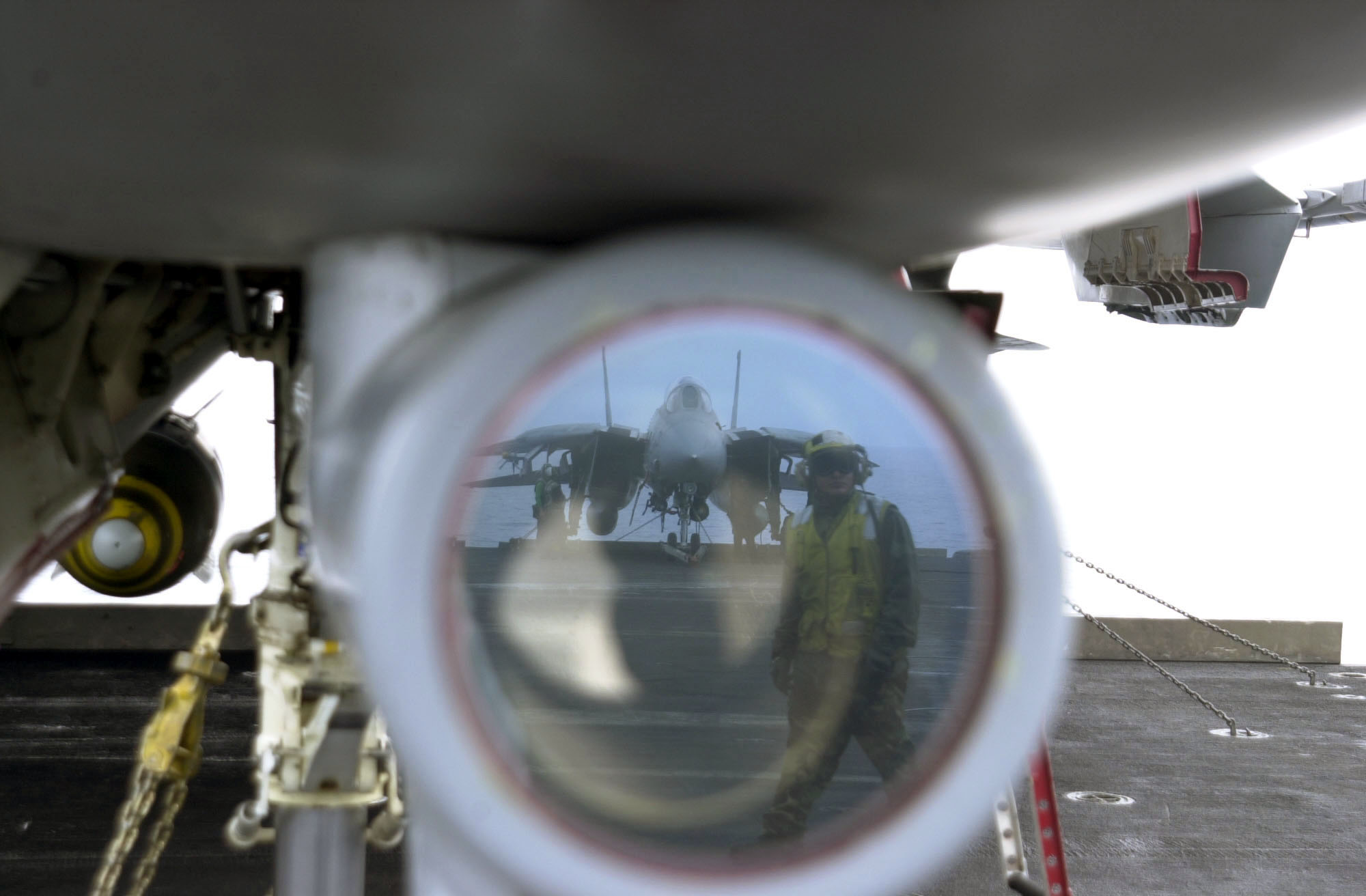

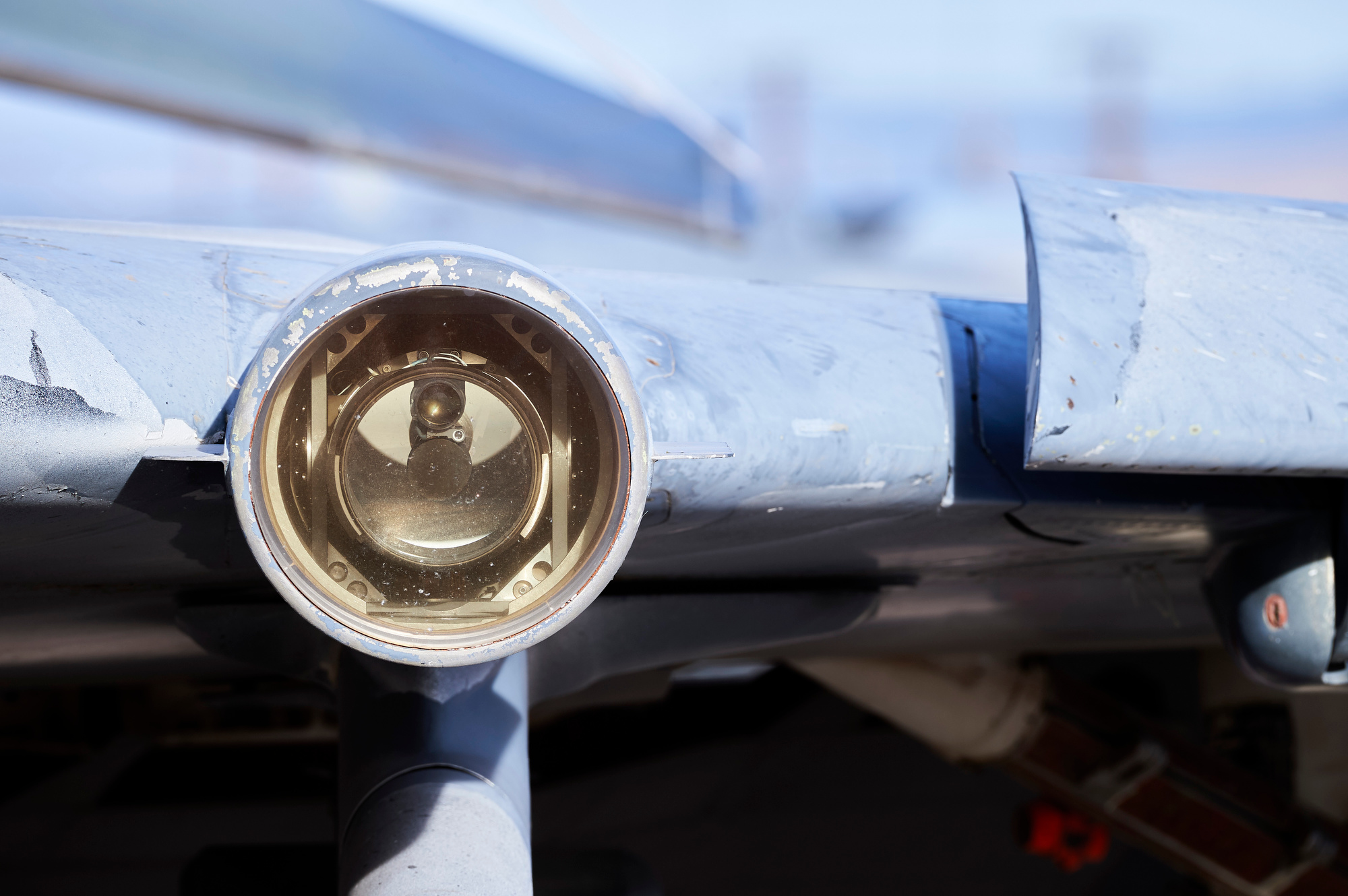
Front view of a Target Identification System Electro-Optical (TISEO) camera on the leading edge of QF-4E 74648 on the ramp of Holloman Air Force Base, New Mexico, USA, on the day before the final flight of an F-4 Phantom II by the US Air Force.

The Target Identification System Electro-Optical (TISEO) is the Target identification device used in the F-4 Phantom and F-14 Tomcat that provides sharp close-up images of hostile aircraft outside of visual range.

== See also ==
- List of military electronics of the United States
