= List of aircraft (D–De) =

This is a list of aircraft in alphabetical order beginning with 'D', up through those beginning with 'De'.

== D–De ==
=== D'Apuzzo ===
see also: de Knight, Parsons-Jocelyn

- D'Apuzzo D-200 Freshman
- D'Apuzzo D-200 Junior Aero Sport
- D'Apuzzo D-260 Senior Aero Sport
- D'Apuzzo D-295 Senior Aero Sport
- D'Apuzzo D-201 Sportwing

=== D'Ascanio ===
(Corradino D'Ascanio, Italy)

- D'Ascanio Helicopter (1930)

=== Dabos ===
(Jean Dabos)

- Dabos Roitelet
- Dabos JD.24P D'Artagnan

=== Dabos-Cholot ===
(Jean Dabos & Jacques Cholot)

- DC.01 Rapace

=== Dabos-Masclet ===
(Jean Dabos et Masclet) see Avions JDM

=== Dąbrowski ===
- Dąbrowski D.1 Cykacz
- Dąbrowski D.2

=== DAC ===
(Dutch Aeroplane Company, Dordrecht, Netherlands)

- DAC RangeR

=== Daedalus ===
(Daedalus Research Group, Petersburg, VA)

- GTP-350

=== Daewoo ===
- Daewoo SHI KTX-1

=== Daher ===
- Daher Kodiak 100
- Daher Kodiak 900
- Daher TBM 700
- Daher TBM 850
- Daher TBM 900
- Daher TBM 910
- Daher TBM 930

=== Daiichi Kosho ===
- Daiichi Kosho Beat
- Daiichi Kosho Whisper

=== Daily ===
(H M Daily, Chicago, IL)

- Daily Old glory

=== Daimler ===
(Daimler Motorengesellschaft Werke)

- Daimler CL.I
- Daimler D.I
- Daimler D.II
- Daimler G.I (Daimler R.I)
- Daimler G.II (Daimler R.II)
- Daimler L6
- Daimler L8
- Daimler L9
- Daimler L11
- Daimler L14
- Daimler L15
- Daimler L20
- Daimler L21
- Daimler Lutskoy No. 1 monoplane

=== Dakota Cub ===
- Dakota Cub Super 18-180 EXP
- Dakota Cub Super 18-160 EXP
- Dakota Cub Super 18-LT-EXP

=== Dal ===
(Wayne Dalrymple & Charles Pheiffer, Wichita, KS)

- Dal Sport a.k.a. Dal Special

=== Dalby ===
(Daniel Dalby)

- Dalby Pouchel

=== Dale ===
(Glendale, MA)

- Dale Air-Dale

=== Dale ===
(Harold Dale)

- Dale A
- Dale Air-Dale M-50
- Dale Weejet 800

=== Dallach ===
(WD Flugzeug Leichtbau / Wolfgang Dallach)

- Dallach D.2 Sunrise
- Dallach Sunrise IIA
- Dallach Sunrise IIB
- Dallach Sunrise IIC
- Dallach Sunrise (Verner)
- Dallach D.3 Sunwheel
- Dallach D.4 Fascination
- Dallach D.4 BK Fascination
- Dallach D.5 Evolution

=== Dallair Aeronautica ===
- Dallair Aeronautica FR-100 Snap!

=== Dalotel ===
- Dalotel DM-165
- Dalotel DM-125 Club
- Dalotel DM-160 Club
- Dalotel DM-160 Professional
- Dalotel DM.165 Viking

=== Damblanc-Lacoin ===
- Damblanc–Lacoin Alérion helicopter

=== Damoure-Fabre-Lacroix ===
(Damoure, Jean Fabre and Léon Lacroix)

- Damoure-Fabre DF.5
- Damoure-Fabre-Lacroix DFL.6 Saphir

=== Danex Engineering ===
(Hungary)

- Lamco Eurocub

=== Dansair ===
(Faircraft Corp (consortium), Dansville, NY, 1946: Dansair Corp.)

- Dansair Coupe

=== Danton-Denhaut ===
- Danton-Denhaut 1910 biplane

=== Danville ===
(Danville Aircraft Co (T D Ketchpaw), Danville, VA)

- Danville Sport Plane

=== DAR ===
(D'rzhavna Aeroplanata Rabotilnica in Cyrillic ДАР – Държавната аеропланна работилница)

- DAR Uzunov-1 (DAR U-1) – DFW C.Va
- DAR 1 Peperuda ('Butterfly')
- DAR 2 – Albatros C.III
- DAR 3 Garvan ('Raven' or Laz-3)
  - DAR 3(I) prototype
  - DAR 3(I.bis)
  - DAR Garvan-I
  - DAR Garvan-II
  - DAR Garvan-III
- DAR 4
- DAR 5 Brambar ('Beetle')
- DAR 6
- DAR 7
- DAR 7 SS.1
- DAR 8 Slavei (or Slavey, 'Nightingale')
  - DAR 8A
- DAR 9 Siniger ('Titmouse' or 'Tomtit')
- DAR 10 Bekas ('Snipe')
- DAR 11 Lyastovitsa ('Swallow') – 50 planned licensed Czech Avia B.135s [unbuilt]
- DAR 13

=== DAR ===
(Аероплани ДАР ЕООД – DAR aeroplanes EOOD)

- DAR 21 Vector
- DAR 21S
- DAR-23
- DAR 25 Impuls
- DAR Solo
- DAR Speedster

=== DARA ===
(Dayton Air Race Associates, Dayton, OH, constructed by WBB Associates, Dayton, OH)

- DARA Special

=== Dare ===
((Melvin E) Dare Aircraft Corp, 6003 14 St, Detroit, MI)

- Dare Safety Airplane

=== Darcissac-Grinvalds ===
(Jaques Darcissac – Jean Grinvalds)

- Darcissac-Grinvalds DG-87 Goéland

=== DARPA ===
(Defense Advanced Research Projects Agency)

- Boeing X-37
- Boeing X-45
- FALCON Hypersonic Weapon System/Hypersonic Cruise Vehicle
- General Atomics MQ-1 Predator unmanned drone
- Hypersonic Research Program
- Integrated Sensor is Structure unmanned airship
- Northrop Grumman Switchblade unmanned oblique-wing aircraft
- System F6 Fractionated Spacecraft distributed satellite demonstrator

=== Dart ===
(Dart Aircraft, United States)

- Dart Skycycle

=== Dart ===
(Dart Aircraft Ltd)

- Dart Cambridge
- Dart Totternhoe
- Dart Flittermouse
- Dart Pup
- Dart Kitten
- Dart Grunau Baby
- Dart Zögling
- Dart replica Lilienthal glider
- Dart replica Cayley glider
- Dart replica Wright glider
- Dart Weasel

=== Dart ===
(Dart Mfg Corporation)

- Dart G
- Dart GC
- Dart GK
- Dart GW
- Dart GW Special

=== Dashatou ===
See: Xianyi

=== Daspect ===
- Daspect III

=== Dassault ===
- Dassault Balzac V
- Dassault Barougan
- Dassault Étendard II
- Dassault Étendard IV
- Dassault Étendard VI
- Dassault Falcon 5X
- Dassault Falcon 6X
- Dassault Falcon 7X
- Dassault Falcon 8X
- Dassault Falcon 9X
- Dassault Falcon 10
- Dassault Falcon 10X
- Dassault Falcon 20
- Dassault Falcon 50
- Dassault Falcon 100
- Dassault Falcon 200
- Dassault Falcon 900
- Dassault Falcon 2000
- Dassault Falcon Cargo Jet
- Dassault Falcon Guardian
- Dassault LOGIDUC
- Dassault Méditerranée
- Dassault Mercure
- Dassault Mercure 100
- Dassault Milan
- Dassault Mirage III
- Dassault Mirage IIIV
- Dassault Mirage 5
- Dassault Mirage 50
- Dassault Mirage IV
- Dassault Mirage 2000
- Dassault Mirage 4000
- Dassault Mirage F1
- Dassault Mirage F2
- Dassault Mirage F3
- Dassault Mirage G
- Dassault Mirage G-8
- Dassault Mystère 20
- Dassault nEUROn
- Dassault Rafale
- Dassault Super Étendard
- Dassault Super Mystère
- Dassault MD 80 ABC
- Dassault MD 303
- Dassault MD 311
- Dassault MD 312
- Dassault MD 315 Flamant
- Dassault MD 316T
- Dassault MD 320 Hirondelle
- Dassault MD 410 Spirale
- Dassault MD 415 Communauté
- Dassault MD 415M Diplomate
- Dassault MD 450 Ouragan
- Dassault MD 452 Mystère II
- Dassault MD 453 Mystère IIIN
- Dassault MD 454 Mystère IV
- Dassault MD 455 Spirale III
- Dassault MD 550 Mirage

=== Dassault-Breguet ===
- Dassault-Breguet Atlantique
- Dassault Breguet CC-117 Falcon Canadian Armed Forces
- Dassault Breguet Dornier Alpha Jet

=== Dassy ===
- Dassy Da.1
- Dassy DA.2

=== Dätwyler ===
- Dätwyler 1038 MDC Trailer
- Dätwyler Lerche
- Dätwyler MD-3 Swiss Trainer

=== Dauby ===
(Dauby Equipment Co, 2100 Hyde Park Blvd, Los Angeles, CA)

- Dauby Twin Navion

=== Daugherty ===
(Earl Daugherty, Long Beach, CA)

- Daugherty 1915 Biplane

=== Daurelle ===
(Paul Daurelle)

- Daurelle AD.01

=== Davenport ===
(Bradley Davenport, Colorado Aero Tech.)

- Davenport BD-2 Nuggit

=== Davidson ===
(George L O Davidson, Denver, CO)

- Davidson Air-Car

=== Davis ===
((Walter C) Davis Aircraft Corp, Richmond, IN)

- Davis D-1
- Davis Racer
- Davis V-3

=== Davis ===
(Arthur J Davis, E Lansing, MI)

- Davis Racer

=== Davis ===
(H R Davis, Hobart, IN)

- Davis Challis B

=== Davis ===
(Charles M Davis, Pauls Valley, OK)

- Davis Special
- Davis Sport

=== Davis ===
((Leon) D Davis Aircraft Corp, Lake Village, IN, 1976: Stanton, TX)

- Davis DA-1
- Davis DA-2
- Davis DA-2A
- Davis DA-3
- Davis DA-5
- Davis DA-5A
- Davis DA-6
- Davis DA-7
- Davis DA-8
- Davis DA-9 Super Pocket Rocket
- Davis DA-10
- Davis DA-11

=== Davis ===
(Gilbert Davis, Nampa ID. 19??: Davis Wing Ltd, Boise, ID)

- Davis Starship Alpha

=== Davis-Douglas Company ===
(see #Douglas)

- Douglas Cloudster
- Davis-Douglas DT
- Davis-Douglas DTB

=== Dawson ===
(C R Dawson, Glenn W Johnson & Clay Henley, Coeur d'Alene, ID)

- Dawson Pistol Ball
- Dawson Pistol Ball II

=== Day ===
(Charles Healy Day, Paterson, NJ)

- Day 1910 Tractor
- Day A a.k.a. Special

=== Days ===
(Robert R Days, Wadsworth, OH)

- Days Comet Sport

=== Dayton ===
(See Pheasant Aircraft Company)

=== Dayton-Wright ===
- Dayton-Wright XO-3
- Dayton-Wright XPS-1
- Dayton-Wright TA-3
- Dayton-Wright TA-5
- Dayton-Wright TW-3
- Dayton-Wright Aerial Coupe
- Dayton-Wright Bug
- Dayton-Wright Bull Head
- Dayton-Wright Cabin Cruiser
- Dayton-Wright Chummy
- Dayton-Wright DH-4
- Dayton-Wright DWH-4 Blue Bird
- Dayton-Wright FP.2
- Dayton-Wright FS
- Dayton-Wright KT
- Dayton-Wright Limousine
- Dayton-Wright M-1
- Dayton-Wright Messenger
- Dayton-Wright OW-1
- Dayton-Wright RB-1 Racer
- Dayton-Wright RB-1
- Dayton-Wright SDW
- Dayton-Wright T-4
- Dayton-Wright USXB
- Dayton-Wright WA
- Dayton-Wright WD
- Dayton-Wright WS
- Dayton-Wright Nine-Hour Cruiser

=== Daytona ===
(Daytona Aircraft Construction Inc, Deland, FL)

- Daytona D-120
- Daytona D-160
- Daytona D-180
- Daytona D-200
- Daytona D-250
- Daytona D-270
- Daytona D-300

=== de Bernardi ===
(Mario de Bernardi)

- de Bernardi M.d.B. 02 Aeroscooter

=== de Berry ===
(E P de Berry, Pacific Aero Club, Los Angeles, CA)

- de Berry 1911 Biplane

=== de Bolotoff ===
(de Bolotoff Aeroplane Works, Sevenoaks, Kent, United Kingdom)

- de Bolotoff 1913 triplane
- de Bolotoff SDEB 14

=== de Bothezat ===
(George de Bothezat)

- de Bothezat 1922 helicopter
- de Bothezat GB-5 (1940)

=== de Boysson ===
- de Boysson A-3

=== de Brageas ===
- de Brageas Type E

=== de Bruyère ===
- de Bruyère C1

=== de Bruyne ===
(Aero Research Limited)

- de Bruyne Snark
- de Bruyne-Maas Ladybird

=== de Busschere ===
(Donald de Busschere)

- de Busschere Skylark I
- de Busschere Skylark II

=== de Chenne ===
(DeChenne (or Monett) Motor & Aeroplane Co (Pres: L B Durnil), Monett, MO)

- de Cheenne 1911 Biplane a.k.a. 'Monett Biplane' and 'Dechene-Sowers' (sic)

=== de Glymes ===
(Raoul de Glymes de Hollebecque)

- de Glymes DG-X (DG-10)
- De Glymes Colanhan

=== de Havens & Watkins ===
(Claude de Haven & A C Watkins, San Francisco, CA)

- de Havens & Watkins 1909 Monoplane

=== de Havilland ===
(for Geoffrey de Havilland's "DH" designs before the DH.14, see Airco)

- de Havilland DH.14 Okapi
- de Havilland DH.16
- de Havilland DH.18
- de Havilland DH.27 Derby
- de Havilland DH.29 Doncaster
- de Havilland DH.32
- de Havilland DH.34
- de Havilland DH.37
- de Havilland DH.42 Dormouse
- de Havilland DH.50
- de Havilland DH.51
- de Havilland DH.53 Humming Bird
- de Havilland DH.54 Highclere
- de Havilland DH.56 Hyena
- de Havilland DH.60 Moth
  - de Havilland DH.60X Moth
  - de Havilland DH.60M Moth
  - de Havilland DH.60G Gipsy Moth
  - de Havilland DH.60 Genet Moth
  - de Havilland DH.60T Moth Trainer
  - de Havilland DH.60GIII Moth Major
- de Havilland DH.61 Giant Moth
- de Havilland DH.65 Hound
- de Havilland DH.66 Hercules
- de Havilland DH.71 Tiger Moth
- de Havilland DH.72
- de Havilland DH.75 Hawk Moth
- de Havilland DH.77
- de Havilland DH.80 Puss Moth
- de Havilland DH.81 Swallow Moth
- de Havilland DH.82 Tiger Moth
  - de Havilland DH.82A Tiger Moth
  - de Havilland DH.82C Tiger Moth
  - de Havilland DH.82C Menasco Moth
  - de Havilland PT-24
- de Havilland DH.83 Fox Moth
- de Havilland DH.84 Dragon
- de Havilland DH.85 Leopard Moth
- de Havilland DH.86 Express
- de Havilland DH.87 Hornet Moth
- de Havilland DH.88 Comet
- de Havilland DH.89 Dragon Rapide
- de Havilland DH.90 Dragonfly
- de Havilland DH.91 Albatross
- de Havilland DH.92 Dolphin
- de Havilland DH.93 Don
- de Havilland DH.94 Moth Minor
- de Havilland DH.95 Flamingo
- de Havilland DH.98 Mosquito
- de Havilland DH.99 Mosquito
- de Havilland DH.100 Vampire
- de Havilland DH.101 Mosquito
- de Havilland DH.102 Mosquito
- de Havilland DH.103 Hornet
- de Havilland DH.104 Dove
- de Havilland DH.106 Comet
- de Havilland DH.108 Swallow
- de Havilland DH.110 Sea Vixen
- de Havilland DH.113 Vampire
- de Havilland DH.112 Venom
- de Havilland DH.112 Sea Venom
- de Havilland DH.114 Heron
- de Havilland DH.115 Vampire Trainer
- de Havilland DH.121 Trident
- de Havilland DH.125 Jet Dragon

=== de Havilland Aeronautical Technical School ===
- de Havilland T.K.1
- de Havilland T.K.2
- de Havilland T.K.3
- de Havilland T.K.4
- de Havilland T.K.5

=== de Havilland Australia ===
- de Havilland Australia DHA-G1
- de Havilland Australia DHA-G2
- de Havilland Australia DHA-3 Drover

=== de Havilland Canada ===
- de Havilland Canada DHC-1 Chipmunk
- de Havilland Canada DHC-2 Beaver
- de Havilland Canada DHC-3 Otter
- de Havilland Canada DHC-4 Caribou
- de Havilland Canada DHC-5 Buffalo
- de Havilland Canada DHC-6 Twin Otter
- de Havilland Canada Dash 7
- de Havilland Canada Dash 8
- de Havilland Canada CC-108
- de Havilland Canada CC-115
- de Havilland Canada CT-120
- de Havilland Canada C-127
- de Havilland Canada CSR-123
- de Havilland Canada CC-132
- de Havilland Canada CC-138
- de Havilland Canada CC-142
- de Havilland Canada CT-142
- de Havilland Canada AC-1
- de Havilland Canada AC-2
- de Havilland Canada C-7
- de Havilland Canada C-8
- de Havilland Canada CV-2
- de Havilland Canada CV-7
- de Havilland Canada E-9
- de Havilland Canada L-20
- de Havilland Canada O-5
- de Havilland Canada U-1
- de Havilland Canada U-6
- de Havilland Canada UV-18

=== de Kalbermatten ===
(Laurent de Kalbermatten, Villars-sur-Glâne, Switzerland)

- Kalbermatten Woopy

=== de Kallis ===
((---) DeKallis, California)

- de Kallis Air Truck

=== de Knight ===
(William "Bart" de Knight, Levittown, PA)

- de Knight Special

=== de Lackner ===
((Donald) de Lackner Helicopters Inc., Mt Vernon, NY)

- de Lackner DH-4 Heli-Vector
- de Lackner DH-5 Aerocycle
- de Lackner HO-2
- de Lackner HZ-1 Aerocycle
- de Lackner Model 125 Cloud Buster

=== de Laurier ===
(Dr James de Laurier, Canada)

- de Laurier 2001 Ornithopter

=== de Lesseps ===
(Paul de Lesseps)

- Monoplan de Lesseps

=== de Lloyd Thompson ===
- de Lloyd Thompson Looper

=== de Lotty ===
((Henri) DeLotty Flying School: de Lotty Aircraftsmen Co, San Francisco, CA)

- de Lotty 1929 Monoplane

=== de Marçay ===
(Société Anonyme d'Etudes et de Construction Aéronautique Edmond de Marçay - SAECA Edmond de Marçay)

==== de Marçay-Kluijtmans ====
(Edmond de Marçay & J. Kluijtmans)

- de Marçay-Kluijtmans 1907 Dirigeable
- de Marçay-Kluijtmans 1908 Dirigeable

==== de Marçay-Moonen ====
(Edmond de Marçay & Emile Moonen)

- de Marçay-Moonen 1911 monoplane
- de Marçay-Moonen 1912 monoplane
- de Marçay-Moonen L'Abeille
- de Marçay-Moonen 1912 2-seat monoplane
- de Marçay-Moonen 1913 floatplane racer
- de Marçay-Moonen 1914 double-biplane canard

==== de Marçay ====
(SAECA Edmond de Marçay or Anonyme d'Etudes et de Construction Aéronautique Edmond de Marçay)

- de Marçay 1
- de Marçay 2
- de Marçay 3
- de Marçay 4
- de Marçay 5
- de Marçay T-2
- de Marçay Limousine
- de Marçay Passe-Partout
- de Marçay single-seat tourer

=== de Monge ===
(Louis de Monge)

- De Monge DMP-1 (twin boom glider)
- de Monge 1914 monoplane
- Lumière-de Monge racer
- Buscaylet-de Monge 5/2
- Buscaylet-de Monge 7/3
- Buscaylet-de Monge 7-4
- Buscaylet-de Monge 7-5
- Buscaylet-de Monge 8/1 CN.2
- Buscaylet-de Monge 9/1
- Buscaylet-de Monge 10/1 C.2
- de Monge 120 RN.3
- de Monge 140 BN.4
- de Monge 5/1 (racer - Lumière-de Monge racer?)
- de Monge 6/1 (amphibian project)
- de Monge M-101
- de Monge M-160
- de Monge Live Wing monoplane

=== de Pischof ===
(Alfred de Pischof)

- de Pischoff 1907 biplane
- de Pischof 1911 Autoplan
- de Pischof Avionnette 1920
- de Pischof Estafette 1922

=== de Rouge ===
(Charles de Rouge)

- de Rouge Elytroplan
- de Rouge Elytroplan-Lateron

=== de Schelde ===
(NV Koninklijke Maatschappij de Schelde)

- de Schelde Scheldemusch
- de Schelde Scheldemeeuw
- de Schelde S.12
- de Schelde S.20
- de Schelde S.21

=== de Vastey ===
(Georges de Vastey)

- Georges de Vastey G-1 Papillon
- Georges de Vastey G-2

=== de Viscaya ===
(Pierre de Viscaya)

- de Viscaya PV-102

=== De Vore ===
- Verilite Sunbird

=== de Witt ===
(Albert H de Witt, Gary, IN)

- de Witt T-1

=== Dean ===
(Herbert F Dean, Flint, MI)

- Dean Delt-Air 250

=== Dean ===
(Carlyle W Dean, VA)

- Dean Parasol

=== Debreyer ===
(Jean-Claude Debreyer)

- Debreyer JCD-02 Pélican
- Debreyer JCD-03 Pélican

=== Decazes ===
(Viscount Decazes and G. Besancon)

- Decazes Helicoplane

=== Dechaux ===
(Dechaux)

- Dechaux Helicop-jet

=== Dedalus ===
- Dedalus Poppy

=== Deekay ===
(Deekay Aircraft Corporation Ltd.)

- Deekay Knight

=== Deicke ===
(Arthur Deicke)

- Deicke ADM 1
- Deicke ADM 2
- Deicke ADM 3
- Deicke ADM 4
- Deicke ADM 5
- Deicke ADM 6
- Deicke ADM 8
- Deicke ADM 9
- Deicke ADM 10
- Deicke ADM-11
- Deicke 1931 biplane (tricycle and tail-skid u/c)

=== Dejouy ===
(Jacques Dejouy)

- Dejouy 4 BA

=== Del Mar ===
(Bruce Del Mar / Del Mar Engineering Laboratories, Los Angeles CA.)

- Del Mar DH-1A Whirlymite
- Del Mar DH-1B Whirlymite
- Del Mar DH-1C Whirlymite
- Del Mar DH-2 Whirlymite
- Del Mar DH-2A Whirlymite Scout
- Del Mar DH-2C Target Drone
- Del Mar DH-20 Whirlymite Tandem

=== Deland ===
(Orlando Helicopter Airways, Deland, FL)

- Deland Travel Air 2000

=== Delanne ===
(Maurice Delanne, France)

- Delanne DL-10
- Delanne 11
- Delanne DL-20T
- Delanne 30 P2
- Delanne 60 E1
- Delanne DL-70
- Delanne DL-150
- Delanne DL-160
- Delanne DL-190

=== Delannoy ===
(Guy Delannoy)

- Delannoy helicopter

=== Delasalle-Lesage ===
(Gérard Feugray and Christian Lesage)

- Delasalle-Lesage DL.260
- Delasalle-Lesage DL.340

=== Delattre ===
(Jacques Delattre)

- Delattre Potez 6

=== Délémontez-Cauchy ===
(Jean Délémontez et Alain Cauchy)

- Délémontez-Cauchy DC.1

=== Délémontez-Desjardins ===
(Jean Délémontez et Jacques Desjardins)

- Délémontez-Desjardins D.01 Ibis

=== Délémontez-Miettaux ===
(Jean Délémontez &t Lucien Miettaux)

- Délémontez-Miettaux DM.01 Bébé Spécial

=== Deleray ===
(Deleray Aircraft Works, Freeport, NY)

- Deleray D-5 Sport Plane

=== Delgado ===
(Delgado Trades School, New Orleans, LA (now Delgado Community College))

- Delgado Flash
- Delgado Maid
- Higgins Rotorplane

=== Delta Helicopters ===
(Delta Helicopters, Tanah Merah, Queensland, Australia)

- Delta D2

=== Delta Sailplane Corporation ===
- Delta Sailplane Honcho
- Delta Sailplane Nomad

=== Delta System Air ===
- Delta Pegass

=== Delvion ===
(Jean DELmontez - Jacques VION)

- Delvion DR 100 Diésel
- Delvion D 111 Diésel
- Delvion DVD (diésel)
- Delvion Zéphir

=== Dementyev ===
- Dementyev Mercury 6

=== Deming ===
(Gurnie A Deming, Lake Worth, FL)

- Deming Mid-wing

=== Demonty-Poncelet ===
- Demonty-Poncelet D.P.I
- Demonty-Poncelet Cambgul II
- Demonty-Poncelet Cyrano (Sabca)

=== Dempsey ===
(Tom Dempsey, Odessa, TX)

- Dempsey TD-2
- Dempsey TD-3 Beta Lightning

=== Denel ===
- Denel Rooivalk
- Denel Aerospace Systems Bateleur
- Denel SARA

=== Denhaut ===
(François Denhaut)

- Denhaut Type A (1911)
- Denhaut Type B (1912)
- Denhaut Hy.749 (1926/27 Denhaut design built by France-Aviation)

=== Denize ===
(Robert Denize)

- Denize RD.105 Raid Driver
- Denize RD.20 Raid Driver
- Denize RD.125 Raid Driver
- Denize RD.135 Raid Driver

=== Denney ===
(Denney Aerocraft)

- Denney Kitfox
- Denney Kitfox II
- Denney Kitfox III
- Denney Kitfox IV (XL)

=== Denoix ===
(Élie Denoix)

- Denoix ED.5 Demoiselle

=== Deperdussin ===
(Société Pour les Appareils Deperdussin) (Note: there is much confusion over Deperdussin's aircraft so the listed aircraft here may refer to the same item, hopefully all will be revealed later)

- Deperdussin Type A
- Deperdussin Type B Sports
- Deperdussin Type C
- Deperdussin Type D Monocoque
- Deperdussin T
- Deperdussin TT
- Deperdussin Coupe Schneider
- Deperdussin Type B concours militaire 1911
- Deperdussin 1912 Racing Monoplane
- Deperdussin Monocoque
- De Feure-Deperdussin No.2 Monoplane
- British Deperdussin Seagull

=== Desaer ===
- Desaer ATL-100

=== Descamps ===
(Elisée Alfred Descamps)

- Descamps 16
- Descamps 17
- Descamps 27
- Descamps-Brunet DB-16

=== Descatoire ===
(Christian Descatoire)

- Descatoire CD.01 Astuss

=== Desjardin ===
- Desjardin Beaver des Pauvres

=== Desoutter ===
- Desoutter Mk.I
- Desoutter Mk.II

=== Detemple ===
(Detemple Helicopter Inc, Venice, CA)

- Detemple DH-28

=== Detroit ===
- Detroit DAC-2C
- Detroit G-1 Gull
- Detroit E-2 Sea Rover
- Detroit ZMC-2 (Zeppelin Metal Clad-2)
- Detroit DL-1 Vega
- Detroit DL-2 Sirius
- Detroit DL-2A Altair
- Detroit YP-24
- Detroit TE-1
- Detroit Y1P-24
- Detroit Y1A-9
- Detroit AirSpaceX

=== Detroit Cleveland ===
- Detroit Cleveland Airship

=== Dewald ===
(Bad Schönborn, Germany)

- Dewald Sunny

=== Dewey ===
(Jim Dewey, Santa Paula, CA)

- Dewey 1966 Monoplane
- Dewey Bird

=== Dewoitine ===
(Emile Dewoitine - Société Aéronautique Française, formerly Constructions Aéronautiques E. Dewoitine, nationalized in 1936 as Société Nationale de Constructions Aéronautiques du Midi (SNCAM))

- Dewoitine AXD
- Dewoitine P-1
- Dewoitine P-2
- Dewoitine P-3
- Dewoitine P-4
- Dewoitine D.1
- Dewoitine D.2
- Dewoitine D.3
- Dewoitine D.4
- Dewoitine D.5
- Dewoitine D.6
- Dewoitine D.7
- Dewoitine D.8
- Dewoitine D.9
- Dewoitine D.10
- Dewoitine D.12
- Dewoitine D.13
- Dewoitine D.14
- Dewoitine D.15
- Dewoitine D.17
- Dewoitine D.18
- Dewoitine D.19
- Dewoitine D.21
- Dewoitine D.22
- Dewoitine D.23
- Dewoitine D.24
- Dewoitine D.25
- Dewoitine D.26
- Dewoitine D.27
- Dewoitine D.28
- Dewoitine D.30
- Dewoitine D.31
- Dewoitine D.33 Trait d'Union
- Dewoitine D.332 Emeraude
- Dewoitine D.333
- Dewoitine D.337
- Dewoitine D.338
- Dewoitine D.342
- Dewoitine D.35
- Dewoitine D.37
- Dewoitine D.371
- Dewoitine D.373
- Dewoitine D.40
- Dewoitine HD.41
- Dewoitine HD.411
- Dewoitine HD-412
- Dewoitine D.420
- Dewoitine D.430
- Dewoitine D.440
- Dewoitine D.450
- Dewoitine HD.460
- Dewoitine D.470
- Dewoitine D.480
- Dewoitine D.490
- Dewoitine D.500
- Dewoitine D.501
- Dewoitine D.503
- Dewoitine D.510
- Dewoitine D.511
- Dewoitine D.513
- Dewoitine D.520
- Dewoitine D.521
- Dewoitine D.530
- Dewoitine D.531
- Dewoitine D.532
- Dewoitine D.535
- Dewoitine D.550
- Dewoitine D.551
- Dewoitine D.560
- Dewoitine D.570
- Dewoitine D.580
- Dewoitine D.590
- Dewoitine D.600
- Dewoitine D.620
- Dewoitine D.640
- Dewoitine D.650
- Dewoitine D.660
- Dewoitine D.680
- Dewoitine D.700
- Dewoitine D.710
- Dewoitine D.720
- Dewoitine HD.730
- Dewoitine D.750
- Dewoitine D.760
- Dewoitine D.770
- Dewoitine HD.780
- Dewoitine D.790
- Dewoitine D.800
- Dewoitine D.810
- Dewoitine D.820
- Dewoitine D.860
- Dewoitine D.900
- Dewoitine Navy Type D Carrier Fighter
