= DA5 =

DA5 may refer to:

- DA postcode area (Dartford postcode area), a group of postal codes in England
- Davis DA-5, a light aircraft
- DA5, a model of Honda Integra
- DA5, a Eurofighter Typhoon variant
- DA5, a module code for the unreleased Dungeons & Dungeons adventure City of Blackmoor
- (15235) 1988 DA5, a minor planet
