= Honeymoon Express =

Honeymoon Express may refer to:

- Honeymoon Express (2006 film), an Indian Kannada-language comedy film
- Honeymoon Express (2024 film), a Telugu-language film
- "Honeymoon Express" (Quantum Leap), a 1989 television episode
- "Honeymoon Express", a song by Wendy & Lisa from the album Wendy and Lisa
- The Honeymoon Express, a lost 1926 silent film
- The Honeymoon Express (musical), a 1913 musical by Jean Schwartz, Harold Atteridge, and Joseph W. Herbert
- Dayton-Wright Cabin Cruiser, a 1920s American three-seat touring aircraft, often known as the "Honeymoon Express"
