= D'Apuzzo =

D'Apuzzo is an Italian surname. Notable people with the surname include:

- Adam D'Apuzzo (born 1986), Australian association footballer
- David D'Apuzzo (born 1988), Australian association footballer
- Nick D'Apuzzo, American aircraft designer

== See also ==
- Apuzzo
