= TD-3 =

TD-3 or TD3 may refer to:

- Dempsey TD-3 Beta Lightning, an American homebuilt aircraft design
- Taiwan Dancer TD-3, a Taiwanese homebuilt aircraft design
- Test Drive III: The Passion, a 1990 video game
- Yamaha TD3, a racing motorcycle
- Behringer TD-3 synthesizer (Roland TB-303 clone)
