= Passepartout =

Passepartout (or passe-partout) is French for "pass everywhere" and is commonly used in French in the sense of a master key or passkey. It may refer to:

== Transportation ==
- Besson MB.35 Passe Partout (1926), a French two-seat spotter and observation floatplane
- De Marçay Passe-Partout (1920), a small sport and touring aircraft
- French cutter Passe-Partout (1845), also called the Mutin
- Passe-Partout III, a large sailing yacht designed by Tony Castro

== Other uses ==
- Jean Passepartout, a character in Jules Verne's Around the World in Eighty Days novel
- Passe Partout, a local morning news program on KLFY-TV in Lafayette, Louisiana
- Passe-Partout, a French-language children's television program produced from 1977 to 1992
- Passe-Partout, a mat used in picture framing
- Passepartout, a restaurant run by singer June Tabor in Penrith, Cumbria, England
