= Apuzzo =

Apuzzo is an Italian surname. Notable people with the surname include:

- Matt Apuzzo (born 1978), American journalist
- Michael L. J. Apuzzo (born 1940), American neurological surgeon
- Virginia Apuzzo (born 1941), American LGBT rights and AIDS activist

== See also ==
- D'Apuzzo
