= De Marçay Limousine =

Limousine
- The Limousine at the 1919 Salon

General information
- Type: Two seat tourer
- National origin: France
- Manufacturer: SAECA Edmund de Marçay

History
- First flight: 1920

The de Marçay Limousine was a two-seat French touring biplane introduced at the 1919 Paris Aero Salon. A smaller but otherwise very similar single-seater was also there.

== Design and development ==
As well as the very small and low-powered Passe-Partout, the de Marçay stand at the 1919 Paris Aero Salon displayed two touring aircraft, both powered by 45 kW (60 hp) Le Rhône 9Z nine-cylinder rotary engines. One was a single-seater and the other, the rather larger Limousine, seated two. Some recent sources refer to the latter as the de Marçay T-2. At the time of the show, neither had flown.

Both aircraft were single bay biplanes with wings of rectangular plan mounted with strong stagger. Both upper and lower wings were one-piece, two spar structures. Normally such wings were braced together on each side by a pair of interplane struts, one between each of the two corresponding upper and lower spars and stayed by incidence wires, but the de Marçays had instead rigid interplane braces of parallelogram form. The upper wing was supported over the fuselage with two pairs of N-form cabane struts and the lower one passed under the fuselage and was joined to it by three short struts, two to the forward spar linked to the engine mounting and the other, centrally, to the rear. The wingspan and wing area of the Limousine were about 17% greater than that of the single seater.

They shared a semi-ellipsoidal aluminium engine cowling, split into a spinner from which the propeller protruded and with a large opening for cooling air, and a fixed rear part that reached back to the forward cabane. Behind the engine mounting the fuselage was a circular section, tapered monocoque, with the cockpit of the single-seater under a cut-out in the trailing edge of the upper wing. The absence of internal structure in the fuselage made it straightforward to extend the Limousine's fuselage by 23% to include a second cockpit. At the Salon its two seats were enclosed within a rather blunt canopy or coupé with a flat windscreen and two windows on each side. This was readily detachable and it is not known if the Limousine was flown with it in place.

Their empennages were conventional, with plywood covered horizontal tails on top of the fuselages. The fins were small and semi-circular and the fabric covered rudders had scalloped, rounded edges. They had fixed, tailskid undercarriages with mainwheels on a single axle rubber-sprung from a transverse member mounted on V-struts. The forward member of the V joined the forward fuselage just behind the metal cowling and the rear one went to the lower wing forward attachment points.

There are a few reports on the post-Salon activities of the single-seat de Marçay tourer. In late March 1922 it took off from a football pitch near le Bourget and reached 200 km/h (120 mph). In late June that year it was scheduled to be flown by Guérin at an international meeting in Brussels organised by the Belgian Aeroclub.

== Variants ==
Limousine
Two seat, as described.
Single seater
Smaller with span 5.03 m (16 ft 6 in), length 4.52 m (14 ft 10 in), empty weight 140 kg (300 lb), maximum speed 180 km/h (112 mph).

== Specifications (Limousine) ==
Data from Flight (1 January 1920, pp.16-7)

General characteristics

- Crew: one pilot
- Capacity: one passenger
- Length: 5.56 m (18 ft 3 in)
- Wingspan: 5.97 m (19 ft 7 in)
- Height: 1.95 m (6 ft 5 in)
- Wing area: 15.5 m^{2} (167 sq ft)
- Empty weight: 177 kg (390 lb)
- Gross weight: 379 kg (835 lb)
- Powerplant: 1 × Le Rhone 9Z 9-cylinder rotary, 45 kW (60 hp)
- Propellers: 2-bladed

Performance

- Maximum speed: 140 km/h (87 mph, 76 kn)
