= Super 18 Model S18-180 =

S18-180
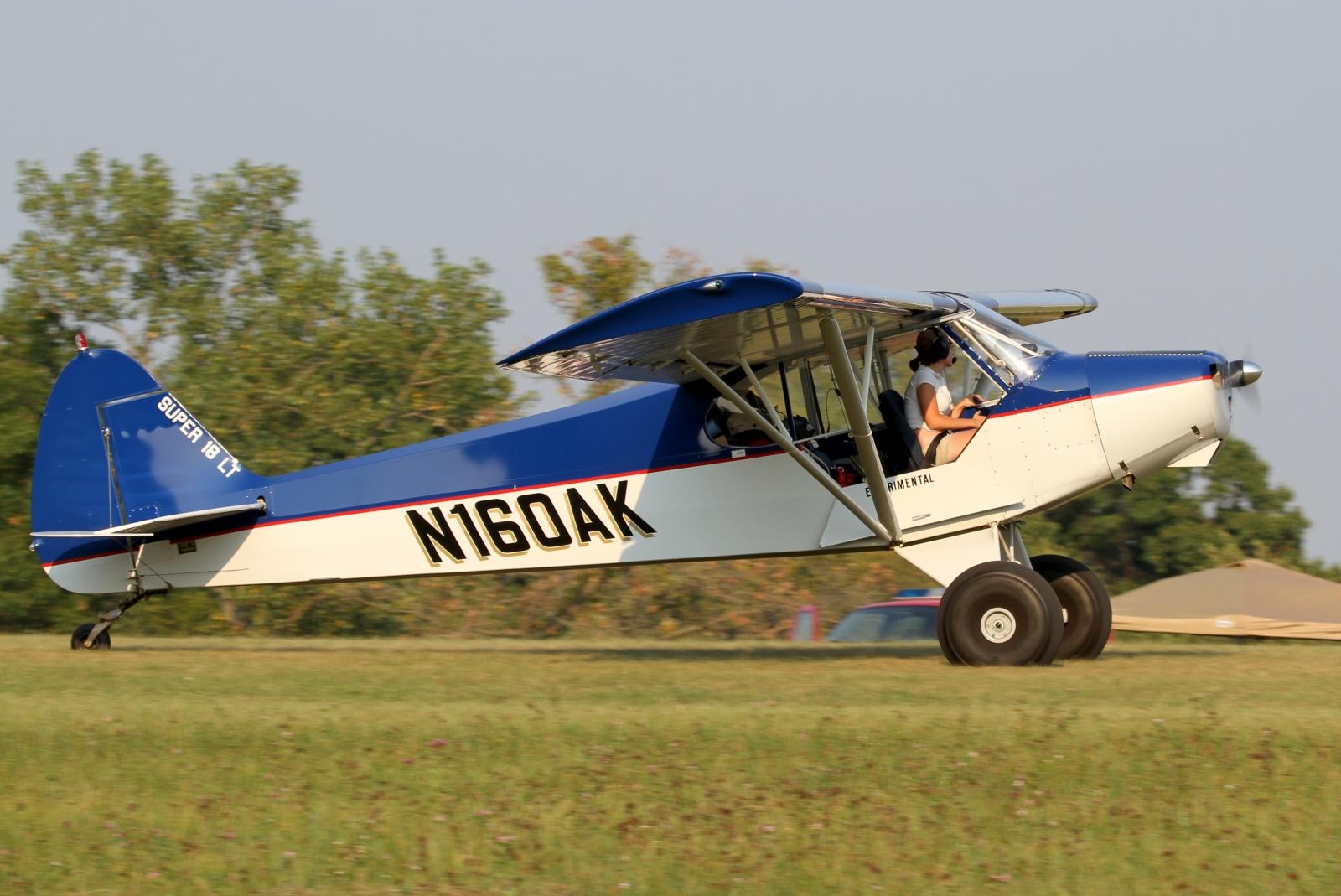

General information
- Type: Sport aircraft
- National origin: United States
- Manufacturer: Super 18
- Designer: Mark Erikson

History
- Developed from: Piper PA-18
- Variant: Dakota Cub Super 18

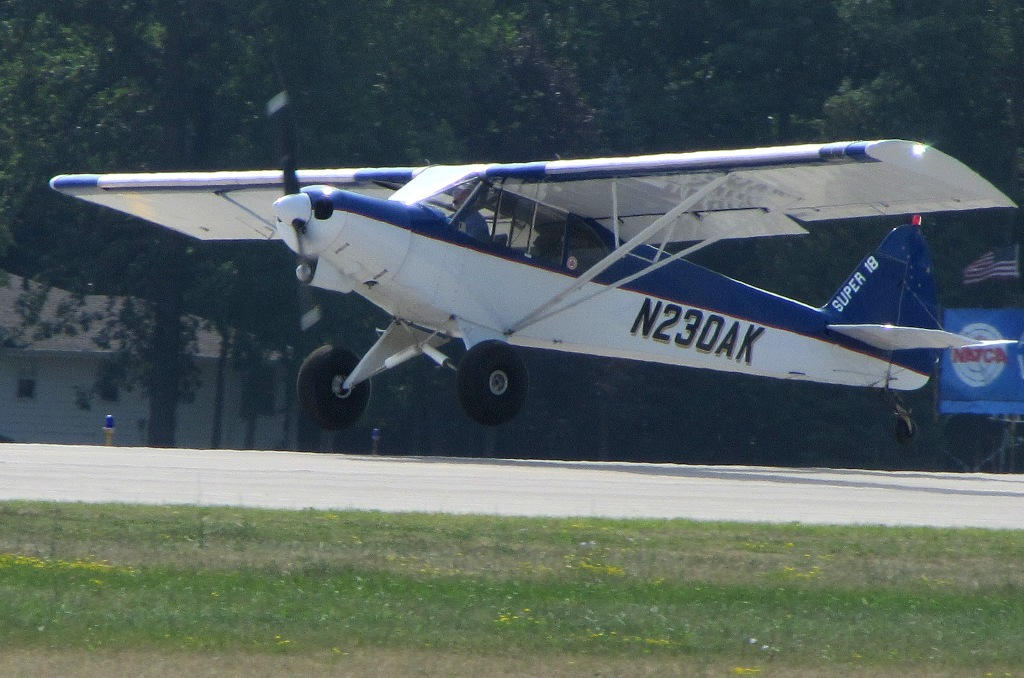
Super 18 landing

The Super 18 Model S18-180 is an FAA type certificated light aircraft evolved from the Piper PA-18 Super Cub.

== Design and development ==
The Super 18-180 is a strut-braced, high-wing monoplane with conventional landing gear. The fuselage is constructed with welded steel tubing with aircraft fabric covering. The design is based on the Piper PA-18 with improvements. These include a wide cabin, slotted leading edges and enlarged flaps.

The Super 18-180 was FAA type certificated in 2009.

== Variants ==
Dakota Cub Super 18
Dakota Cub is operated as a separate company building the experimental homebuilt variant of the Super 18 series.

== Specifications (Super 18-180) ==
Data from Super 18 LLC

General characteristics

- Crew: 1
- Capacity: 1
- Empty weight: 1,250 lb (567 kg)
- Gross weight: 2,300 lb (1,043 kg)
- Powerplant: 1 × Lycoming O-360-C4P Horizontally Opposed Piston, 180 hp (130 kW)

Performance

- Stall speed: 45 kn (52 mph, 84 km/h)
- Range: 347 nmi (399 mi, 642 km)
- Rate of climb: 712 ft/min (3.62 m/s)
