= Shober Willie II =

Willie II

General information
- Type: Two-seat sporting or aerobatic aircraft
- National origin: United States
- Manufacturer: Shober Aircraft Enterprises
- Number built: 1

History
- First flight: 1971

The Shober Willie II is an American two-seat sporting or aerobatic aircraft designed and built by Shober Aircraft Enterprises. The aircraft was designed to be sold as plans for amateur construction.

== Design ==
The Willie II is a braced single-bay biplane with a fabric covered welded steel fuselage. The two-spar wooden wings are fabric covered with wide-span ailerons on the lower wing and a fabric covered wired-braced welded steel tail unit. The prototype is powered by a 180 hp (134 kW) Lycoming O-360-A3A four-cylinder piston engine. It has two open cockpits in tandem and a fixed conventional landing gear with a tailwheel.

== Specifications (Prototype) ==
Data from Jane's All the World's Aircraft 1973-74

General characteristics

- Crew: 2
- Length: 5.79 m (19 ft 0 in)
- Wingspan: 6.10 m (20 ft 0 in)
- Wing area: 13.75 m^{2} (148 sq ft)
- Empty weight: 388 kg (856 lb)
- Gross weight: 612 kg (1,350 lb)
- Powerplant: 1 × Lycoming O-360-A3A four-cylinder horizontally-opposed air-cooled piston , 60 kW (80 hp)

Performance

- Cruise speed: 241 km/h (150 mph, 130 kn)
- Stall speed: 96 km/h (60 mph, 52 kn)
- Range: 603 km (375 mi, 326 nmi)
- Service ceiling: 4,570 m (15,000 ft)
- g limits: +9 -9g
- Rate of climb: 15 m/s (3,000 ft/min)

== See also ==
Aircraft of comparable role, configuration, and era

- Stolp Starduster
