= Stolp Starduster =

Starduster
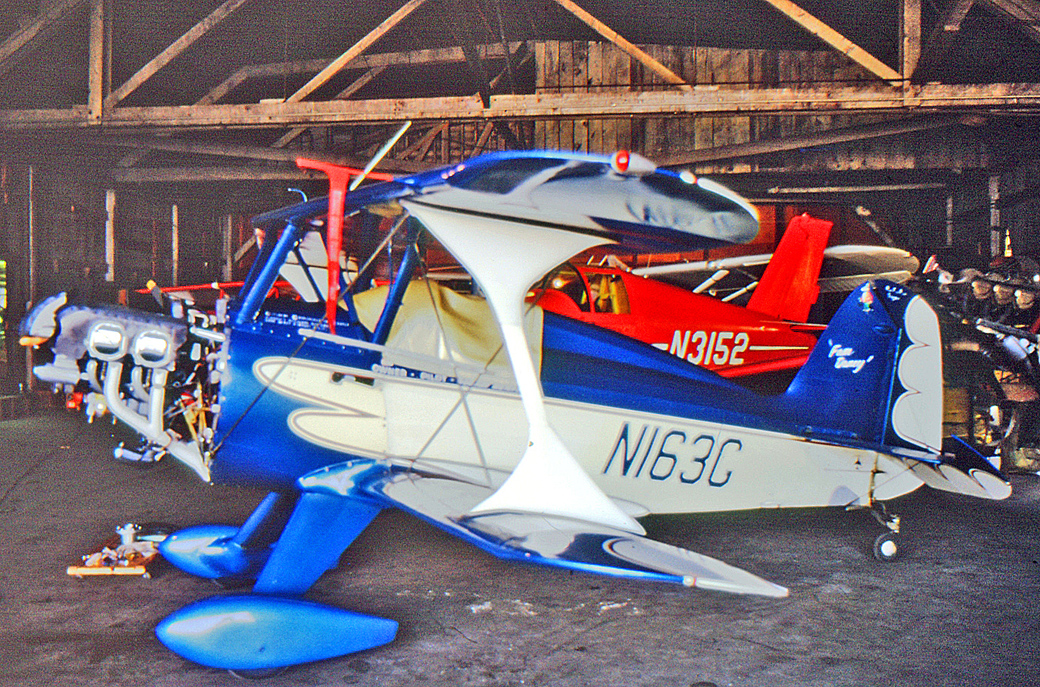
- Stolp-Adams Starduster, amateur-built in 1966, at Long Beach Airport, California, in 1971

General information
- Type: Single seat sport aircraft
- National origin: United States
- Manufacturer: Stolp Aircraft; Aircraft Spruce & Specialty Co.
- Designer: Louis A. Stolp and George M. Adams
- Status: Plans available (2026)

History
- First flight: November 1957
- Variant: Stolp Starduster Too

The Stolp-Adams SA-100 Starduster is an American single-seat sport biplane designed to be built from plans supplied by Aircraft Spruce & Specialty Co. Though the first flight was in 1957, Stardusters continue to be built and flown.

== Design and development ==
The SA-100 Starduster was designed by Louis A. Stolp and George M. Adams as a light sports aircraft for homebuilding from plans. It is a single bay biplane with fabric covered, wooden framed staggered wings, each pair braced by a single, wide chord interplane strut aided by bracing wires. A total of eight centre section struts join the upper wing to the fuselage, basically two pairs in N-form but with the forward strut doubled. The lower wing is unswept and has 1.5° of dihedral; the upper wing has 6° of sweep on its leading edge, no dihedral and a greater span. There are ailerons on the lower wings only, but no flaps.

The fuselage and tail unit have a fabric covered steel tube structure, with the open cockpit positioned just behind the swept upper wing trailing edge which has a rounded cut-out for upward visibility. There is a long and prominent faired headrest behind the cockpit, on top of the curved upper fuselage surface. The Starduster has a conventional tail unit, with a wire braced tailplane and straight tapered, round topped fin and rudder, the latter extending to the keel between split elevators. Both rudder and elevators are horn balanced.

The Starduster has a recommended power range of 125 to 160 hp (93 to 119 kW) and is usually powered by a four-cylinder, horizontally opposed, 125 hp (93 kW) Lycoming O-290-D-1, though more powerful engines of up to 200 hp (150 kW) have been fitted. It has a conventional tailwheel undercarriage. The mainwheels are mounted on V-struts hinged from the lower fuselage longeron, with rubber shock absorbers on diagonal extension struts between wheel and a short, central, under fuselage V-form mounting bracket. The main legs are often partially or completely faired and the wheels enclosed in spats.

== Operational history ==
Starduster plans remain available more than 50 years after the first flight and homebuilding building continues. A Starduster register currently shows 27 SA-100 Stardusters and 3 SA-101 Super Stardusters built and building. The FAA register shows 64 SA-100s and 1 SA-101, though not all are assigned and some further Stardusters appear without a type number.

== Variants ==
SA-100 Starduster
Original version, designed for non-aerobatic flight. Although many have proven stress to +6g -4G and a Vne of 185 kn

SA-101 Stolp Super Starduster
Larger and more powerful — uses the longer wings of the CA300 Starduster Too, which have a symmetric M6 airfoil and no dihedral, together with a 180 hp (134 kW) Lycoming IO-360-A1A engine to produce a maximum speed of over 170 mph (275 km/h).

== Specifications (SA-100) ==
Data from Jane's All the World's Aircraft 1966/7, p.331, Aerofiles

General characteristics

- Capacity: 1
- Length: 16 ft 6 in (5.03 m)
- Upper wingspan: 19 ft 0 in (5.79 m)
- Lower wingspan: 18 ft 0 in (5.49 m)
- Height: 6 ft 0 in (1.83 m)
- Wing area: 110.0 sq ft (10.22 m^{2})
- Aspect ratio: 6.33
- Airfoil: NACA 4412
- Empty weight: 700 lb (318 kg)
- Max takeoff weight: 1,247 lb (566 kg)
- Fuel capacity: 20 Imp gal (24 US gal, 91 L)
- Powerplant: 1 × Lycoming O-290-D-1 4-cylinder horizontally opposed air cooled, 125 hp (93 kW)
- Propellers: 2-bladed Sensenich M74DM61 fixed pitch

Performance

- Maximum speed: 148 mph (238 km/h, 129 kn)
- Cruise speed: 130 mph (210 km/h, 110 kn)
- Stall speed: 55 mph (89 km/h, 48 kn)
- Range: 400 mi (640 km, 350 nmi)

== See also ==
Aircraft of comparable role, configuration, and era

- D'Apuzzo Senior Aero Sport
- Shober Willie II
