= Délémontez-Cauchy DC.1 =

1980s French aircraft

DC.1

General information
- Type: Ultralight monoplane
- National origin: France
- Manufacturer: Délémontez-Cauchy
- Designer: Jean Délémontez

History
- First flight: July 6, 1980
- Developed from: Jodel D.9

The Délémontez-Cauchy DC.1 is a French ultralight monoplane designed by Jean Délémontez for amateur construction, derived from the Jodel D.9.

== Specifications ==
Data from Les Avions Français de 1965 a 1990

General characteristics

- Crew: 2
- Length: 5.65 m (18 ft 6 in)
- Wingspan: 7.4 m (24 ft 3 in)
- Wing area: 9.56 m^{2} (102.9 sq ft)
- Empty weight: 225 kg (496 lb)
- Gross weight: 397 kg (875 lb)
- Powerplant: 1 × Volkswagen 1,600 cm^{3} (98 cu in) conversion 4-cylinder air-cooled horizontally-opposed piston engine, 48 kW (65 hp)
- Propellers: 2-bladed fixed-pitch propeller

Performance

- Maximum speed: 194 km/h (121 mph, 105 kn)
- Cruise speed: 175 km/h (109 mph, 94 kn)
- Economical cruise speed: 140 km/h (87 mph; 76 kn)
