= Delanne 60-E.1 =

Single-seat French glider, 1938

Dealnne 60-E.1

General information
- Type: Single seat glider
- National origin: France
- Designer: Maurice Delanne, Jarlaud
- Number built: 1

History
- First flight: Before 4 August 1938

The Delanne 60-E.1 was a training sailplane, designed to enable pilots to graduate from their C certificate to the more demanding D. It was also capable of aerobatics. Only one was built but it was used from 1938 to the outbreak of war.

== Design and development ==
The Delanne 60-E.1 was a single seat training glider suitable for those aiming for their D certificate. This required flights of over 50 km (31 mi), out and return flights of more than 5 hours and flights with altitude gains of more than 1,000 m (3,300 ft).

It was a high wing aircraft. In plan the wings had three sections: two straight tapered outer panels with most of the sweep on the trailing edges and with semi-elliptical tips and an inner section, occupying about half the span, with an unswept leading edge and a curved trailing edge which decreased the central chord. It was mounted on the single upper longeron of the triangular section rear fuselage and braced to the central member of the lower forward fuselage with a single strut on each side to the wing at the junction of the wing panels.

The Delanne's fuselage was in two parts, a deep, slightly rounded part, containing the cockpit under the wing leading edge, which occupied about half the overall length of the aircraft. It also had a distinct keel with a landing skid. The rear triangular section or boom overlapped the forward part, reaching the back of the cockpit and tapering to the rear. The leading edges of the swept, straight edged, round tipped tailplanes were fixed to the fuselage underside and were braced to it from above. They carried rounded elevators. The fin, likewise straight-edged, was mounted at the extreme end of the fuselage and extended below the elevators, though the hinge of the deep and very broad curved balanced rudder was far enough aft to require only a small elevator cut-out for movement. The bottom of the rudder was also below the boom but the latter's high position and a tailskid attached to the lower fin protected it from ground contact.

Though the exact date of the Delanne 60-E.1's first flight is not known, it was certainly before 4 August 1938, when the aircraft attracted interest by making the first glider flight over Paris on its way from Coulommiers to Saint-Cyr. The pilot, Eric Nessler, achieved an altitude gain of 1,100 m (3,600 ft) during the flight.

In August it went to La Banne d'Ordanche, from where it was flown by several pilots including Mme Jarlaud, the wife of its engineer. Nessler made a flight of 5 hours in it.

The 60-E.1 was displayed at the 1938 Paris Aero Show (Salon), along with the gull winged, two seat Delanne 30, where it attracted international interest, particularly from Japan. In June 1939 the sole prototype was amongst gliders exhibited by the Aéroclub d'Enghien-Moisselles.

It was used in its planned rôle as a D certificate trainer by the "L'Air" group. It was also capable of aerobatics as Robert Ivernel demonstrated in the summer of 1939 by winning an international competition at Saint-Germain in June and giving an exhibition at Boulogne-Billancourt in July.

== Specifications ==
Data from Les Ailes December 1938

General characteristics

- Crew: One
- Length: 7.50 m (24 ft 7 in)
- Wingspan: 13.35 m (43 ft 10 in)
- Height: 2.13 m (7 ft 0 in)
- Wing area: 15 m^{2} (160 sq ft)
- Aspect ratio: 11.9
- Empty weight: 140 kg (309 lb)
- Gross weight: 225 kg (496 lb)

Performance

- Maximum glide ratio: 19.5
- Rate of sink: 0.85 m/s (167 ft/min)
