= Descamps 17 =

Descamps 17 A2
- Prototype with V-12, 400 hp engine in 1924

General information
- Type: Two seat fighter-reconnaissance aircraft
- National origin: France
- Manufacturer: Elisée Alfred Descamps
- Designer: André Brunet
- Primary user: Armée de l'Air
- Number built: 7

History
- First flight: Spring 1924

The Descamps 17 A.2 was a two-seat reconnaissance fighter built under a French government programme of 1923. Two versions, with different engines, were tested and six examples were built under licence by Caudron as the Caudron C.17 A.2.

== Design and development ==
The Descamps A2 was designed to a government programme for a two-seat reconnaissance aircraft, a category denoted by the military code A2. When the first prototype appeared in March 1924 the manufacturer's name was hyphenated with that of the designer, André Brunet, though the order varied. The first accounts of it did not include a Descamps type number, though according to a more recent source it was the Descamps-Brunet DB-16. Initially, it was powered by a 400 hp (300 kW) Lorraine-Dietrich 12D V-12 engine but by 1926 it had received a 450 hp (340 kW) Lorraine-Dietrich 12E W-12 engine. This version, identical to the DB-16 apart from the new and somewhat heavier engine, was designated the Descamps 17. The new engine improved performance, increasing the top speed at sea level from 203 to 230 km/h (126 to 143 mph).

The structure of the Descamps A.2 was all metal. Such designs were quite new at this time and were criticised as being more difficult to repair compared with wooden-framed machines but Brunet's design enabled any part to be exchanged rapidly. It had no wire bracing and required no rigging. The A2 was a sesquiplane, with an upper wing with twice the span and 3.4 times the area of the lower one, which was not only short but narrow. The two wings had similar plans, rectangular apart from straight angled tips. Only the upper wing carried ailerons. Both wings were built around two I-section spars and were braced together on each side by two sets of airfoil section, N-form interplane struts, one from the upper fuselage to mid-way along the lower wing and the other from there outwards to the upper wing. There was significant stagger, with the leading edge of the lower wing ahead of that of the upper, so the N-struts leaned backwards. There was no dihedral on the lower wing but the upper one was set at 1.5° and slightly swept (2°). The lower wing was mounted on the lower fuselage frame and the upper on a very short upper fuselage pillar. The wings, like the rest of the aircraft, were fabric covered.

The deep but narrow rectangular section fuselage, constructed from duralumin tubes, tapered to a knife edge at the rear and had rounded decking. The nose differed according to engine; the early V-12 had two distinct bulges over the cylinders and a separate rectangular radiator, attached to the fuselage underside, which could be partially retracted by the pilot, whereas the three cylinder banks of the W-12 required an additional central bulge and the radiator was integrated into the nose in front of the engine. There were two open cockpits. The pilot sat in front under the trailing edge of the wing, which had a V-shaped cut-out to improve his field of view. He controlled two fixed, forward firing machine guns and behind him the observer's position was equipped with two more on a gun mount. This post was far enough aft to provide a good all-round view. The tail was conventional, with the tailplane, which had swept leading edges, placed near the top of the fuselage and braced by a single strut on each side from below. The angle of incidence of the tailplane was in-flight adjustable for trim and its elevators were balanced. The vertical tail was rounded and reached down to the keel, operating in a small elevator cut-out. The Descamp's landing gear had mainwheels mounted under the wings at the meeting point of the inner and outer interplane struts, providing a wide track. There was no cross-axle; instead the wheels were mounted on rubber shock absorbers within trouser fairings. This arrangement allowed bombs to be released from under the fuselage; up to 3×120 kg (260 lb) bombs could be carried. The tailskid was free to pivot to assist ground steering.

== Operational history ==
Caudron purchased a licence to build the Descamps 17 A2 from 1927 as the Caudron C.17 A2. After the aircraft had satisfied the reconnaissance programme requirements, six were constructed for the Armée de l'Air.

A notable tour of six European countries was made between 18 October and 19 November 1927 by Massot and an engineer in a civil registered C.17. They covered 8,200 km (5,100 mi).

== Variants ==
Descamps 16 or DB-16

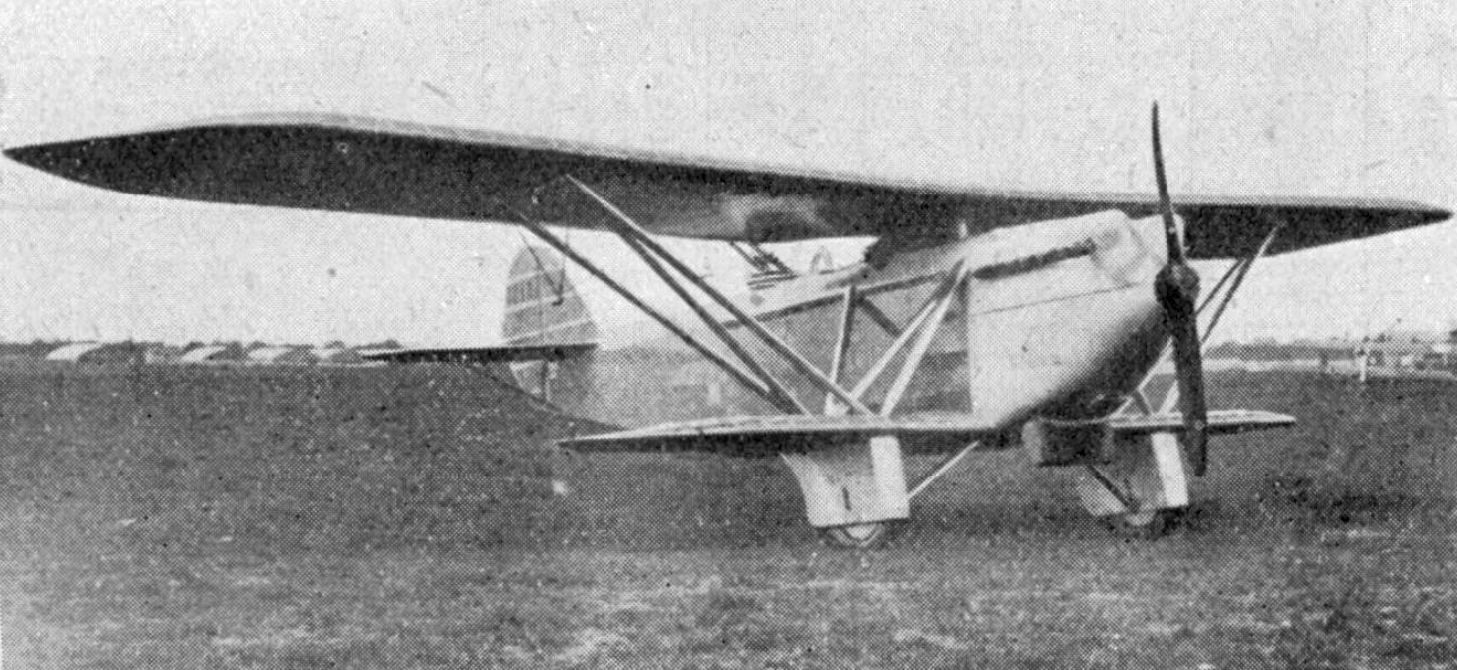
Descamps 16 L'Aéronautique January,1926

400 hp (300 kW) Lorraine-Dietrich 12D V-12 engine
Descamps 17 or DB-17
450 hp (340 kW) Lorraine-Dietrich 12E W-12 engine
Caudron C.17 A.2
Caudron-built Descamps 17.

== Operators ==
France
L'Armée de l'Air

== Specifications (Descamps 17) ==
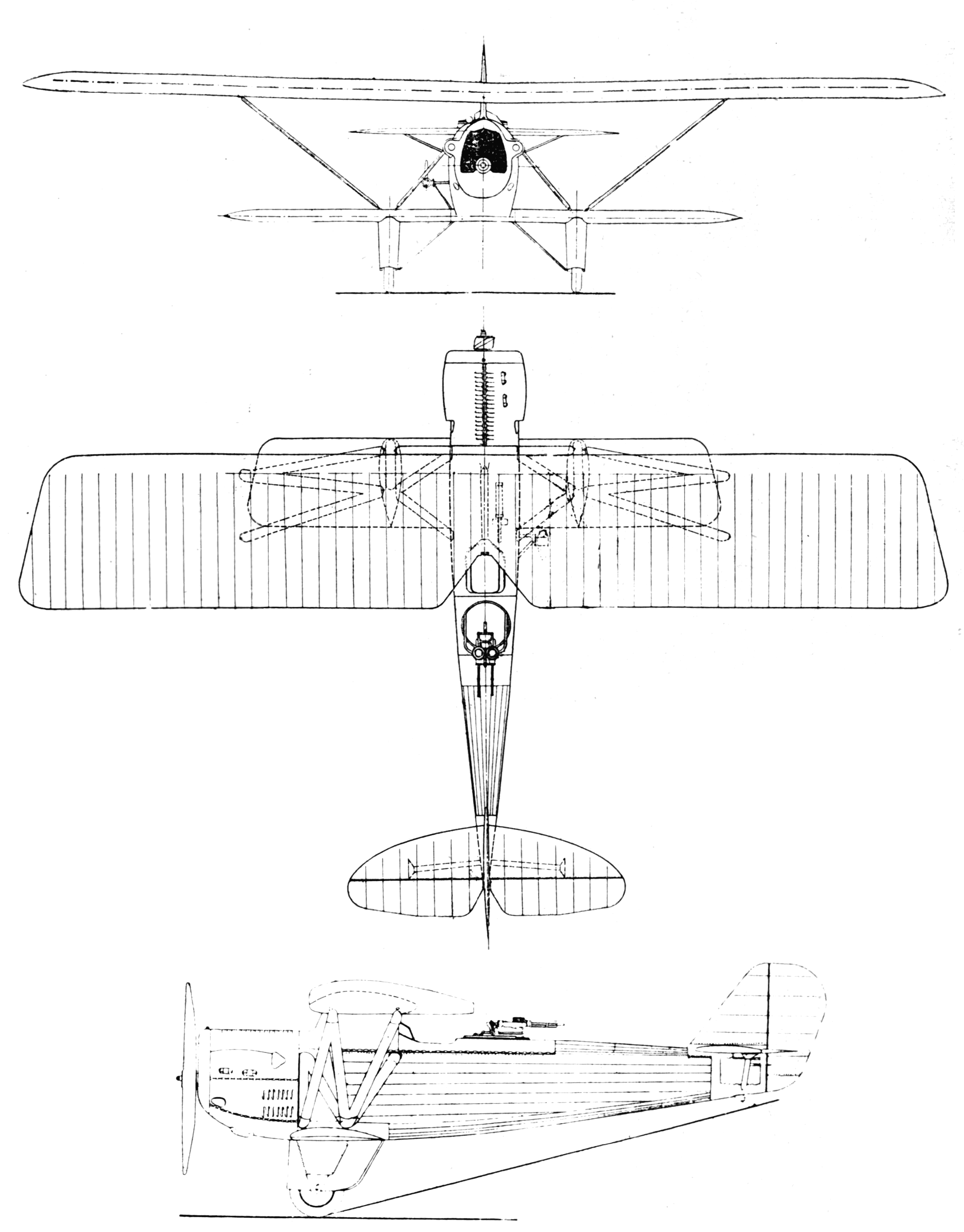
Caudron C.17 A2 3-view drawing from L'Air May 15, 1928

Data from The Paris Aero Show 1926 - Descamps The Paris Aero Show 1926 - Descamps cont.d, Les Avions Caudrons, Jane's all the World's Aircraft 1928

General characteristics

- Crew: Two
- Length: 9.35 m (30 ft 8 in)
- Upper wingspan: 14.5 m (47 ft 7 in)
- Lower wingspan: 7.5 m (24 ft 7 in)
- Height: 3.35 m (11 ft 0 in)
- Wing area: 44 m^{2} (470 sq ft)
- Airfoil: Brunet
- Empty weight: 1,238 kg (2,729 lb)
- Gross weight: 2,046 kg (4,511 lb)
- Fuel capacity: 288 kg (635 lb) (ca. 200 L (53 US gal; 44 imp gal))
- Powerplant: 1 × Lorraine-Dietrich 12E W-12 water-cooled piston engine, 340 kW (450 hp)
- Propellers: 2-bladed fixed pitch propeller

Performance

- Maximum speed: 230 km/h (140 mph, 120 kn) at sea level

220 km/h (140 mph) at 2,000 m (6,600 ft)
208 km/h (129 mph) at 4,000 m (13,000 ft)
197 km/h (122 mph) at 5,000 m (16,000 ft)

- Service ceiling: 6,800 m (22,300 ft)
- Time to altitude: 2,000 m (6,600 ft) in 6 minutes 48 seconds; 4,000 m (13,000 ft) in 16 minutes 24 seconds; 5,000 m (16,000 ft) in 24 minutes 53 seconds
- Wing loading: 48.71 kg/m^{2} (9.98 lb/sq ft)
- Power/mass: 0.16 kW/kg (0.1 hp/lb)

Armament

- Two fixed, synchronised machine guns firing forward through propeller disc; two more on flexible ring mount in rear cockpit.
- Up to 3× 120 kg (260 lb) bombs
