= Dewoitine P-4 =

Two-seat French glider, 1923

P-4

General information
- Type: Sailplane
- National origin: France
- Manufacturer: Constructions Aéronautiques Émile Dewoitine
- Designer: Émile Dewoitine
- Number built: 2

History
- First flight: 16 August 1923

The Dewoitine P-4 was a glider designed by Émile Dewoitine and built by Constructions Aéronautiques Émile Dewoitine in the early 1920s.

== Specifications (P-4) ==
Data from Aviafrance: Dewoitine P-4

General characteristics

- Crew: two
- Length: 5.70 m (18 ft 8 in)
- Wingspan: 14.40 m (47 ft 3 in)
- Wing area: 18 m^{2} (190 sq ft)
- Empty weight: 160 kg (353 lb)
- Gross weight: 300 kg (661 lb)
