= Delanne 30 P2 =

Two-seat French glider, 1937

Delanne 30-P

General information
- Type: High performance, two-seat glider
- National origin: France
- Manufacturer: Delanne
- Designer: Raymond Jarlaud
- Number built: 1

History
- First flight: 1937

The Delanne 30 P2 was a two-seat, French high performance glider built shortly before World War II.

== Design and development ==
The Delanne 30 P2 had a mid-set, gull wing with an aspect ratio of 15 and fitted with camber changing flaps.

Its tapered fuselage had an oval section, the cockpit seating the two occupants in tandem under a long, multi-part glazed canopy. The rear seat was close to the wing leading edge.

It had a rounded fin, with the horizontal tail mounted at half-height.

The Delanne 30 P2 was on display at the 1938 Paris Salon. It flew until the start of World War II but probably did not survive it.

== Specifications ==
Data from j2mcl-planeurs.net

General characteristics

- Crew: One
- Capacity: One passenger
- Length: 8.7 m (28 ft 7 in)
- Wingspan: 18.9 m (62 ft 0 in)
- Wing area: 22.1 m^{2} (238 sq ft)
- Aspect ratio: 15
- Empty weight: 225 kg (496 lb)
- Gross weight: 420 kg (926 lb)

Performance

- Maximum glide ratio: 25:1
- Rate of sink: 0.75 m/s (148 ft/min)

== See also ==
- Delanne 20-T
