= Kalbermatten Woopy =

German inflatable hang glider design

Woopy

General information
- Type: Hang glider
- National origin: Switzerland
- Designer: Laurent de Kalbermatten
- Status: Prototypes only

The Kalbermatten Woopy is a Swiss high-wing, single-place, hang glider that was designed by Laurent de Kalbermatten of Villars-sur-Glâne. The aircraft seems to have been just developed to prototype stage and it is not clear if production was undertaken.

== Design and development ==
The Woopy fuselage is made from aluminum tubing, with a conventional tail, a seated pilot position and weight shift controls. The wing is inflatable and based on the same concept as an air mattress, kept inflated by two small battery-powered fans. Launch and landing is carried out on foot.

Much of the development was undertaken using scale flying models to speed construction and reduce pilot risk.

Two models were developed, the Woopy Fly and the Woopy Jump, plus a powered version of the Woopy Fly.

== Variants ==
Woopy Fly
Initial model. Its 9.7 m (31.8 ft) span wing is inflatable and has an aspect ratio of 4.58:1 and a wing area is 20.5 m^{2} (221 sq ft). The glider empty weight is 17 kg (37 lb) and it has a glide ratio of 9:1.
Powered Woopy Fly
A powered version of the Woopy Fly was developed in Siberia and flown with a 150 cc (9.2 cu in) two-stroke engine that gave it an empty weight of 33 kg (73 lb) and a cruise speed of 45 km/h (28 mph) with a 70 cm (28 in) propeller.
Woopy Jump
More portable development model. Its wing is also inflatable and the glider empty weight is 7 kg (15 lb) and the aircraft can be folded into a bag 160 cm (63 in) long.

== Specifications (Woopy Fly) ==
Data from Bertrand

General characteristics

- Crew: one
- Wingspan: 9.7 m (31 ft 10 in)
- Wing area: 20.5 m^{2} (221 sq ft)
- Aspect ratio: 4.58:1
- Empty weight: 17 kg (37 lb)

Performance

- Maximum glide ratio: 9:1
