= Dallach Sunrise =

Sunrise
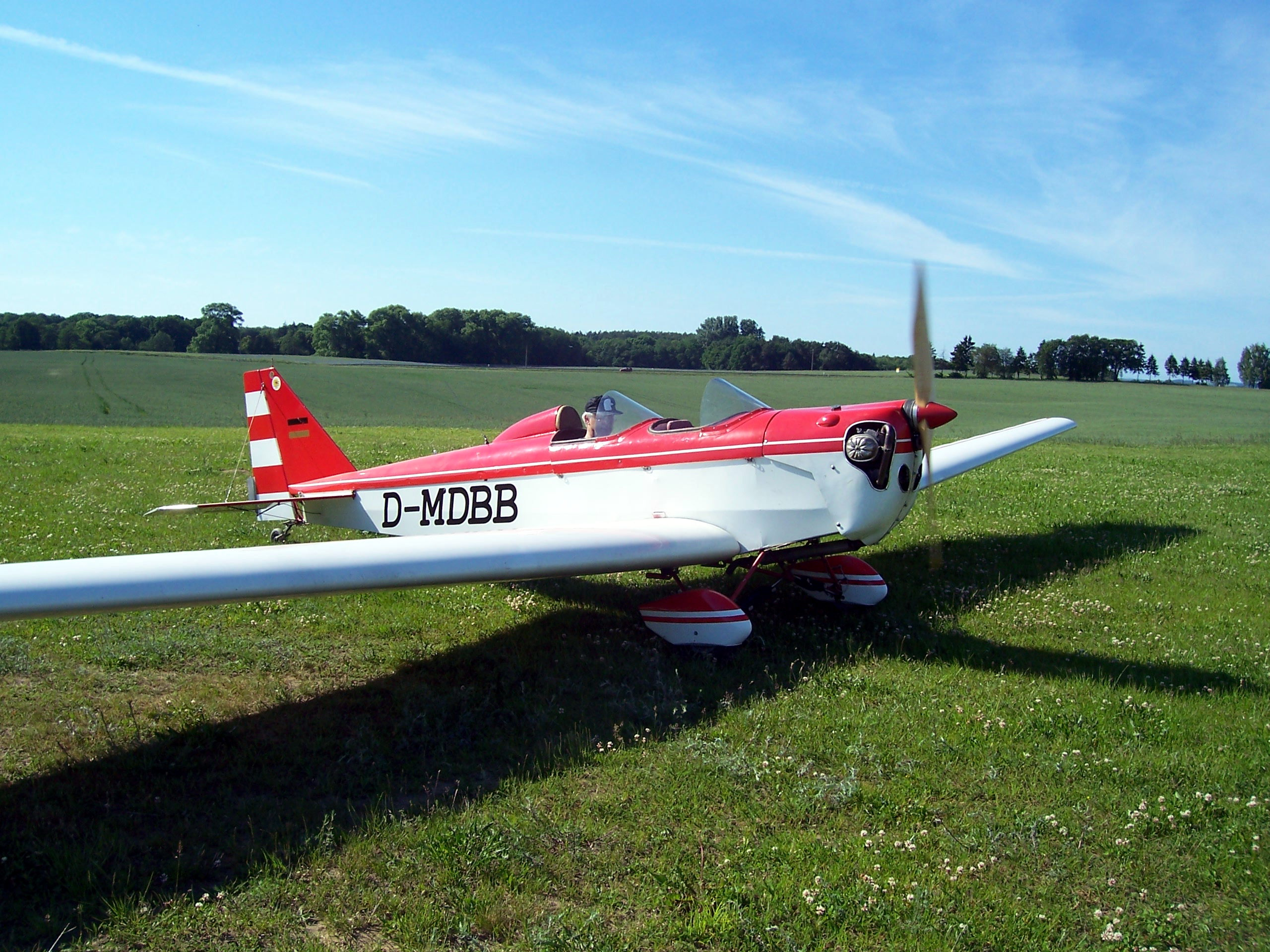

General information
- Type: One or two-seat sport kitbuilt ultralight
- National origin: Germany
- Manufacturer: WD Flugzeug Leichtbau
- Designer: Wolfgang Dallach
- Number built: c.39

History
- Manufactured: 5 years
- First flight: 1986

The Dallach D.2 Sunrise, also known as the WDFL Sunrise after its suppliers, is a single-engine, single-seat cantilever monoplane. It was designed and marketed as a homebuilt aircraft in Germany by Wolfgang Dallach.

== Design and development ==
Wolfgang Dallach's Sunrise, marketed ready-to-fly or in kit form by his WD Flugzeug Leichtbau (WDFL), was his first ultralight design. In Germany, it was the first ultralight equipped with a four-stroke engine. The Sunrise is a tandem two-seater. Both seats are equipped with a throttle lever, rudder and control stick. Full engine control is available only from the rear seat. The fuselage is built from steel tubes and is fabric covered. The wing has a nose made of fiberglass. The main spar is built from CFK. The Sunrise has a fixed tailwheel undercarriage, with the mainwheels hinged from the fuselage on V-form, cross-connected struts. Some Sunrises have wheel fairings.

The Sunrise can be powered by one of several engines in the 28-66 kW (38-90 hp) power range.

== Operational history ==
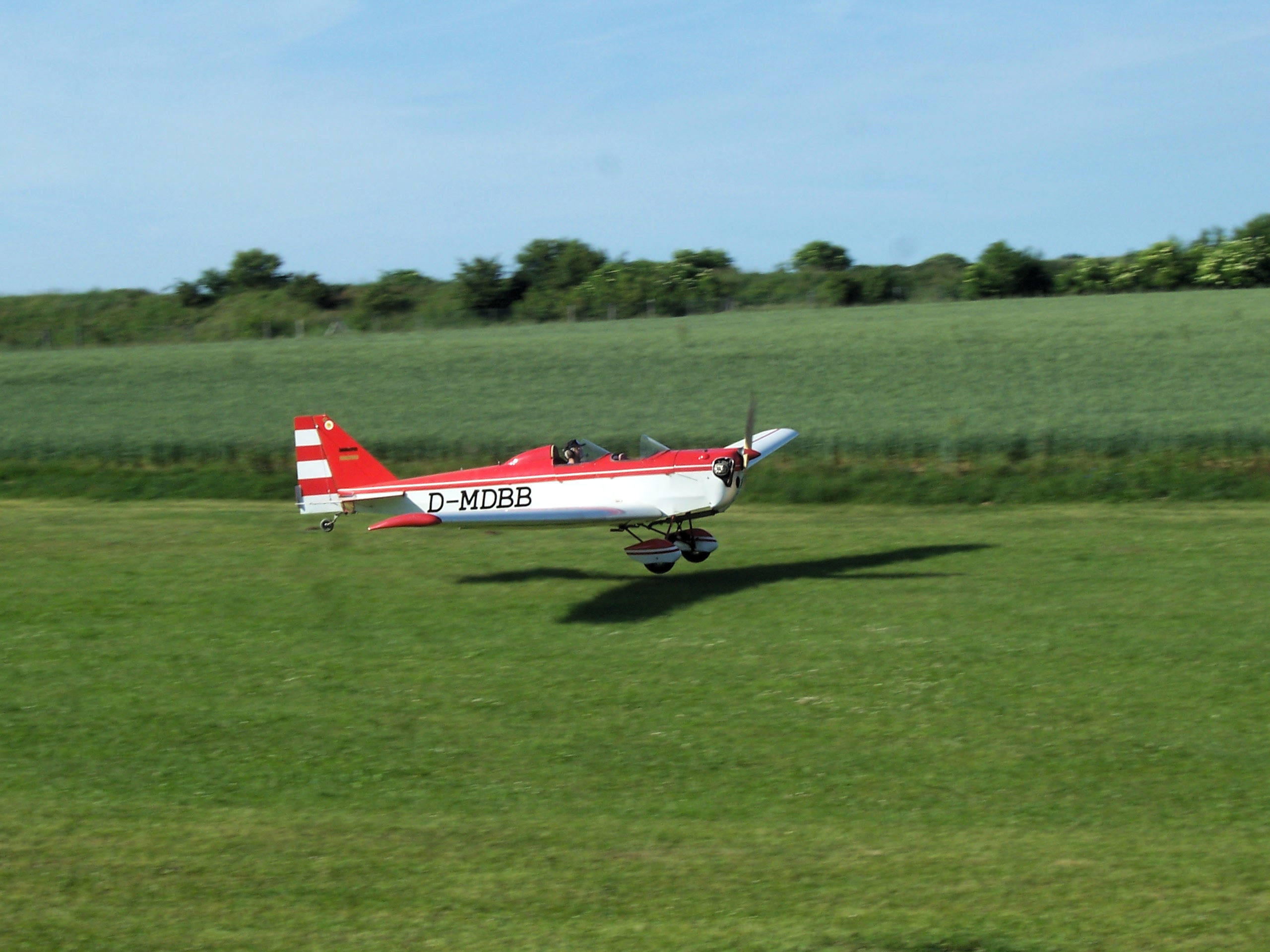
Sunrise II with KKHD-Engine

About 39 Sunrises are thought to have been built, all flying in Germany. In mid-2010, 19 years after kit production ended, 38 still appeared on the German civil register.

== Variants ==
Data from DAec

Sunrise
Original version, 28 kW (37.5 hp) Citroën KKHD four-stroke engine
Sunrise IIA
47 kW (74.6 hp) Sauer UL 2100 two-stroke engine
Sunrise IIB
66 kW (88.5 hp) BMW UL four-stroke engine
Sunrise IIC
51 kW (68 hp) BMW R1000 four-stroke engine
Sunrise (Verner)
59 kW (79 hp) Verner SVS 1400 engine

== Specifications (Citroën KKHD engine) ==
Data from Airelife's World Aircraft

General characteristics

- Capacity: one
- Length: 5.31 m (17 ft 5 in)
- Wingspan: 13.08 m (42 ft 11 in)
- Height: 1.42 m (4 ft 8 in)
- Max takeoff weight: 250 kg (551 lb)
- Powerplant: 1 × Citroën KKHD , 31 kW (42 hp)
- Propellers: 2-bladed

Performance

- Maximum speed: 149 km/h (93 mph, 80 kn)
- Cruise speed: 120 km/h (75 mph, 65 kn)
- Range: 255 km (158 mi, 138 nmi)
