= Delanne 11 =

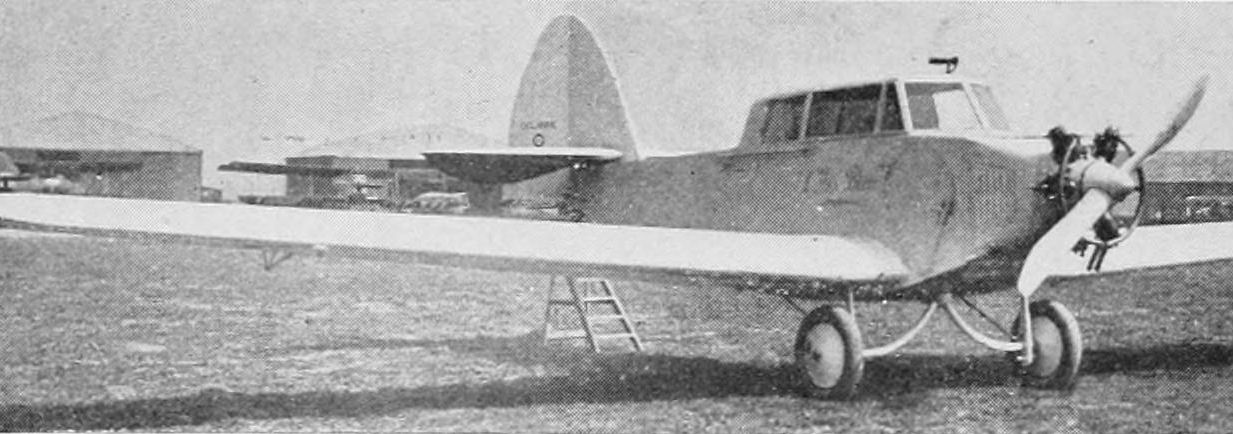

General information
- Type: Two seat tourer
- National origin: France
- Manufacturer: Établissements Letord
- Designer: Maurice Delanne

History
- First flight: 8 March 1929

The Delanne 11 was a French two seat touring aircraft. Only one was built.

== Design and development ==
The Delanne 11 was designed by Maurice Delanne, better known for his later tandem-wing aircraft, together with Girault of Établissements Letord who built it. Design features included a lightly loaded wing for low speed landings, a robust and well sprung undercarriage which could absorb the impacts of an inexperienced pilot's landings, an enclosed cockpit, with excellent all round views and space for parachutes and with a canopy that could be rapidly jettisoned in an emergency using a Letord-developed pressurised gas system.

It was a low wing cantilever monoplane with plywood covered, two spar wooden wings of trapezoidal plan apart from slightly rounded tips. They were mounted with about 2° of dihedral on a very short centre section from which they could be easily demounted. There were long, narrow chord ailerons.

The Delannne 11 was initially powered by a five-cylinder, air-cooled 48 kW (65 hp) Salmson 5A radial engine in the nose, fed from tanks in the wing centre section. Its steel tube mounting was the only major non-wooden structural part of the flat sided, ply skinned fuselage. A high long canopy dominated the upper fuselage, occupying about 40% of its length and enclosing two side-by-side seats, with baggage space behind them. The glazing was unusually free of frames, with just three rectangular glass panels on each side and a smaller, triangular window immediately behind the windscreen. At the rear, the glazing angled in towards the fuselage centreline, the two sides meeting at a vertical edge. A combination of the simple glazing, the canopy height and the surrounding fuselage profile produced notably good all-round vision.

The empennage was conventional, with the tailplane mounted on top of the fuselage. In plan the tailplane was semi-elliptical and the elevators almost semi-circular. The fin and unbalanced rudder also had curved edges and together were rather pointed; the rudder extended to the keel and operated in an elevator cut-out. The undercarriage was of the tailskid type, with a 2.07 m (6 ft 9 in) track. The wheels were on bent split axles mounted on the centreline of the fuselage underside, their ends rubber sprung from vertical V-struts from the wing centre section.

The Delanne 11 was marketed with a 52 kW (70 hp) Anzani 6-cylinder radial as an alternative to the Salmson. Advertisements also offered a three-seat version, powered by an unspecified 72 kW (96 hp) engine; there is no evidence that this variant was flown. No sales were made and only the prototype was built.

The first flight was made by Descamps on 8 March 1929 from Orly, powered by the Salmson engine. By April 1929 the prototype was Anzani powered. It was registered as F-AJGB on 26 June 1929 and named L'Ibis Bleu (The Blue Ibis).

At the end of June 1929 the Delanne 11 was displayed at the II^{e} Concours International d'Avions légers (Second light aircraft competition) in Rotterdam. It was flown by Descamps, the only French pilot there. In May 1931 it was being offered for sale and was re-registered with a new owner in January 1931. It remained active into 1933 and was scheduled to appear at Le Grand Rally de Vins de Bordeaux in late June.

== Specifications ==
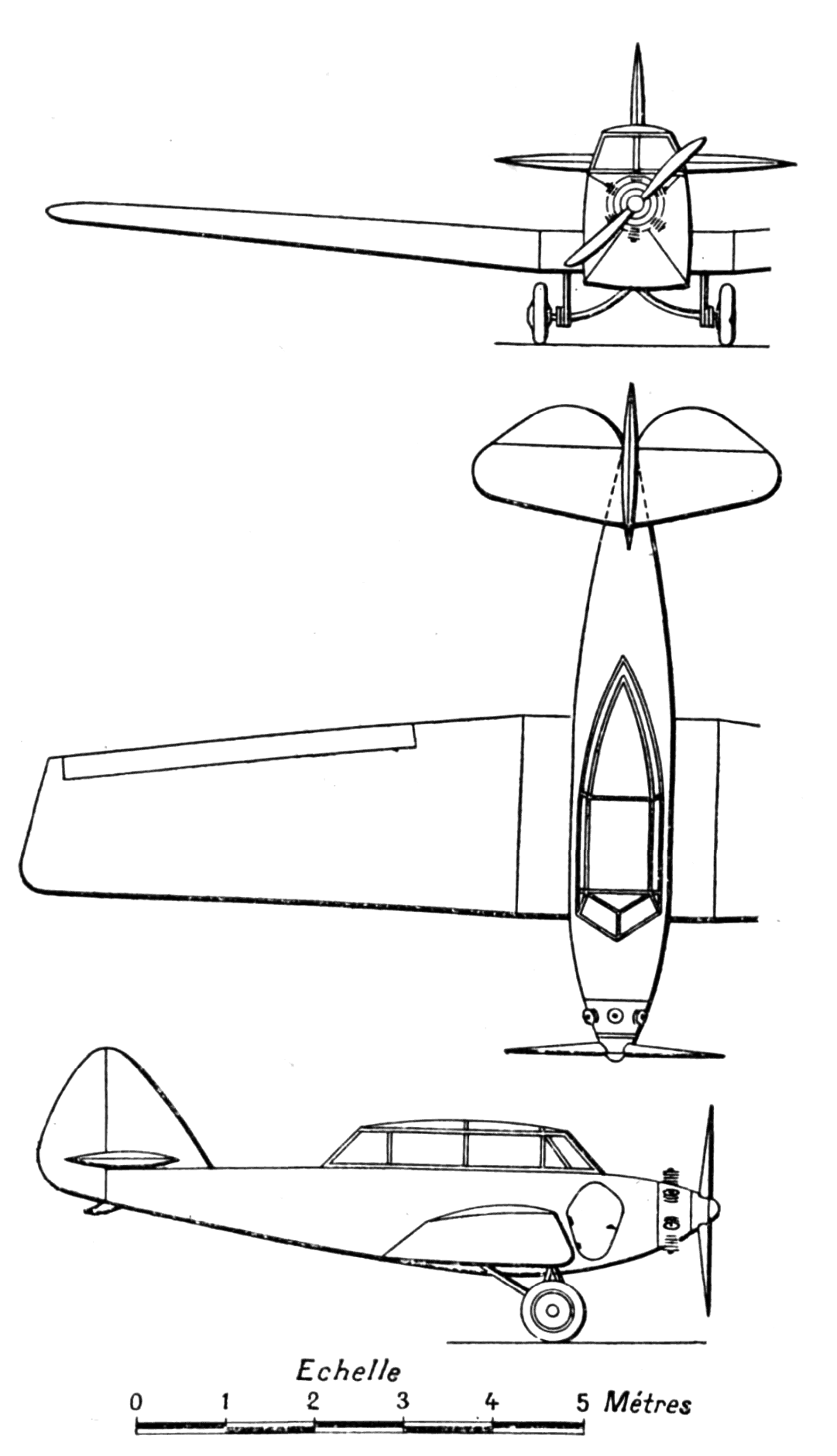
Delanne 11 3-view drawing from L'Aéronautique July,1929

Data from Les Ailes 11 April 1929

General characteristics

- Crew: One
- Capacity: One passenger.
- Length: 7.70 m (25 ft 3 in)
- Wingspan: 13.50 m (44 ft 3 in)
- Height: 2.25 m (7 ft 5 in)
- Wing area: 23 m^{2} (250 sq ft)
- Empty weight: 600 kg (1,323 lb) production aircraft would have been 500 kg (1,100 lb)
- Max takeoff weight: 850 kg (1,874 lb)
- Powerplant: 1 × Anzani air-cooled, six cylinder radial, 52 kW (70 hp) or a 48 kW (65 hp) Salmson 5A air-cooled five cylinder radial engine. Les Ailes does not state which engine fitting provided the given weights and length.
- Propellers: 2-bladed

Performance

- Maximum speed: 145 km/h (90 mph, 78 kn) at ground level. All performance figures are calculated
- Endurance: 5 hr at 850 kg (1,870 lb)
- Service ceiling: 4,000 m (13,000 ft)
