= Delta Pegass =

Pegass

General information
- Type: Two-seat ultralight cabin monoplane
- National origin: Czech Republic
- Manufacturer: Delta System-Air

History
- First flight: 1995

The Delta Pegass is a Czech two-seat ultralight cabin monoplane designed and built by Delta System-Air.

== Design ==
The Pegass is a strut-braced high-wing monoplane powered by either an 80 hp (60 kW) Rotax 912UL or a 64 hp (48 kW) Rotax 582UL engine driving a three-bladed tractor propeller. It has a fixed tricycle landing gear and a cabin with two seats side-by-side, a door on each side of the fuselage for access.

== Specifications (Rotax 912UL) ==
Data from Jane's All the World's Aircraft 2004-05

General characteristics

- Crew: 1
- Capacity: 1
- Length: 5.70 m (18 ft 8.5 in)
- Wingspan: 10.19 m (33 ft 5.25 in)
- Height: 2.37 m (7 ft 9.25 in)
- Wing area: 14.36 m^{2} (153.5 sq ft)
- Empty weight: 225 kg (496 lb)
- Gross weight: 450 kg (992 lb)
- Powerplant: 1 × Rotax 912UL , 60 kW (80 hp)

Performance

- Maximum speed: 170 km/h (105 mph, 91 kn)
- Stall speed: 65 km/h (41 mph, 36 kn)
- Endurance: 4 hours 0 minutes
