= Davenport BD-2 Nuggit =

BD-2 Nuggit (sic)

General information
- Type: Homebuilt aircraft
- National origin: United States
- Designer: Bradley A Davenport

History
- Introduction date: 1969

The Davenport BD-2 Nuggit (sic) is an American biplane developed for homebuilt construction.

== Design and development ==
The B-2 Nuggit is a single place biplane with conventional landing gear. The cockpit is covered with a sliding bubble canopy. The fuselage is welded steel construction with aircraft fabric covering. A round cowling covers the engine to appear like a radial engine installation. The wing uses a wooden spar with aluminum wing ribs.

== Specifications (BD-2 Nuggit) ==
Data from Air Progress

General characteristics

- Crew: one
- Length: 18 ft 7 in (5.66 m)
- Wingspan: 23 ft (7.0 m)
- Empty weight: 930 lb (422 kg)
- Powerplant: 1 × Lycoming O-320 horizontally opposed piston aircraft engine, 150 hp (110 kW)
- Propellers: 2-bladed

Performance

- Cruise speed: 110 kn (130 mph, 210 km/h)
- Endurance: 4 hr
- Rate of climb: 2,400 ft/min (12 m/s)
