= Dätwyler Trailer =

Trailer

General information
- Type: Glider tug
- National origin: Switzerland
- Manufacturer: Max Dätwyler & Co
- Number built: 1

History
- First flight: 1962
- Developed from: Piper PA-18 Super Cub

The Dätwyler 1038 MDC Trailer was a 1960s Swiss glider tug variant of the American Piper PA-18 Super Cub.

== Development ==
Dätwyler had experience converting a number of war-surplus Piper Cubs for the civilian market. He used this experience to create a single-seat glider tug variant, using the wings, tail unit and landing gear from the post-war Super Cub, mated to his newly designed fuselage. Powered by a Franklin flat six piston engine, it first flew in 1960. Only one was built.

== Specifications ==
Data from Orbis

General characteristics

- Crew: 1
- Length: 7.01 m (23 ft 0 in)
- Wingspan: 10.69 m (35 ft 1 in)
- Height: 2.04 m (6 ft 8.5 in)
- Wing area: 16.58 m^{2} (178.5 sq ft)
- Empty weight: 505 kg (1,114 lb)
- Gross weight: 650 kg (1,435 lb)
- Powerplant: 1 × Franklin 6A4-165-B3 flat-six piston engine , 123 kW (165 hp)

Performance

- Maximum speed: 200 km/h (124 mph, 108 kn)
- Cruise speed: 160 km/h (99 mph, 86 kn)
