= De Marçay 2 =

de Marçay 2

General information
- Type: Single seat fighter aircraft
- National origin: France
- Manufacturer: SAECA Edmund de Marçay
- Number built: 1

History
- First flight: early 1919

The de Marçay 2 C1 was a prototype single-seat biplane fighter designed in France and first flown in 1919. It did not go into production.

== Design and development ==
The de Marçay 2 was designed at the end of World War I and flew early in 1919. It was a single-bay sesquiplane with low-aspect ratio, rectangular-plan wings mounted with stagger. On each side a parallel pair of forward-leaning interplane struts defined the bays, with another, outward-leaning pair rooted at their base to brace the overhang of the upper wing. The centre of the latter was attached to the upper fuselage by short cabane struts. Only the upper wings carried ailerons; these narrowed in chord outward before rapidly widening at their tips to form horn balances.

The fighter's fuselage was flat sided, though with rounded upper and lower decking. The original intention was fit a Liberty L-8 V-8 engine but problems with this model led to the installation of a 220 kW (300 hp) Hispano-Suiza 8Fb, also a V-8. A pair of fixed, synchronized 0.303 in (7.7 mm) Vickers machine guns fired through the propeller disc. The pilot's open cockpit placed him at the trailing edge of the upper wing, which had a deep cut-out to improve his upward field of view; the lower wings had smaller cut-outs for downward vision.

The empennage of the de Marçay was conventional, with a triangular tailplane and semi-elliptical elevator mounted on top of the fuselage. The broad chord fin was also triangular, with a rounded rudder which went down to the keel, operating between the elevators. It had a fixed, tailskid undercarriage with its mainwheels on a single axle which was rubber sprung to a transverse cross brace between two pairs of V-struts from the lower fuselage.

Piloted by Lebeau, the de Marçay 2 took part in the C1 or single seat fighter category of the 1919 Service Aéronautique competition held at Villacoublay. Though it was the fastest aircraft there, the Nieuport 29 was awarded a production contract and no more de Marçay 2s were built. The lone prototype was advertised for sale by SAECA Edmund de Marçay through most of 1920, though its ultimate fate is not recorded.

== Variants ==
de Marçay 1 C1
A single-seat fighter, as originally designed in 1918, powered by a 400 hp (300 kW) Liberty L-12; not built.
de Marçay 2 C1
The de Marçay 1 re-designed to accommodate a 300 hp (220 kW) Hispano-Suiza 8Fb; one built.

== Specifications (de Marçay 2) ==
Data from The Complete Book of Fighters, French Aircraft of the First World War, Jane's all the World's Aircraft 1919

General characteristics

- Crew: one
- Length: 6.62 m (21 ft 9 in)
- Wingspan: 9.25 m (30 ft 4 in)
- Wing area: 25 m^{2} (270 sq ft)
- Aspect ratio: 3.42
- Gross weight: 1,704 kg (3,757 lb)
- Useful load: 338 kg (745 lb)
- Powerplant: 1 × Hispano-Suiza 8Fb water-cooled V-8, 220 kW (300 hp)
- Propellers: 2-bladed fixed-pitch wooden propeller

Performance

- Maximum speed: 252 km/h (157 mph, 136 kn) at sea level

237 km/h (147 mph; 128 kn) at 3,000 m (9,800 ft)
231 km/h (144 mph; 125 kn) at 4,000 m (13,000 ft)
220 km/h (140 mph; 120 kn) at 5,000 m (16,000 ft)
200 km/h (120 mph; 110 kn) at 6,000 m (20,000 ft)

- Time to altitude: 1,000 m (3,300 ft) in 2 minutes

2,000 m (6,600 ft) in 4 minutes 26 seconds
3,000 m (9,800 ft) in 7 minutes 26 seconds
4,000 m (13,000 ft) in 12 minutes 3 seconds
5,000 m (16,000 ft) in 18 minutes 16 seconds

Armament

- Two synchronized 7.7 mm (0.303 in) Vickers machine guns.

== Bibliography ==
- Davilla, Dr. James J. & Soltan, Arthur M. (1997). French Aircraft of the First World War. Stratford, Connecticut: Flying Machines Press. ISBN 0-9637110-4-0.
- Green, William & Swanborough, Gordon (2001) [1994]. The Complete Book of Fighters: An Illustrated Encyclopedia of Every Fighter Built and Flown (Revised and Updated ed.). London: Salamander Books. ISBN 1-84065-269-1.
- Owers, Colin A. (2020). French Warplanes of WWI: A Centennial Perspective on Great War Airplanes. Gret War Aviation Centennial Series (43). Vol. 1: Fighters. n.p.: Aeronaut Books. ISBN 978-1-935881-93-3.
