= De Marçay 4 =

de Marçay 4

General information
- Type: Single seat fighter
- National origin: France
- Manufacturer: SAECA Edmund de Marçay
- Designer: Botali and Georges Lebeau
- Number built: 1 or 2

History
- First flight: 1923

The de Marçay 4 was a single seat monoplane fighter built in France in 1923 for a government competition. It did not receive a production contract.

== Design and development ==
The de Marçay 4 was designed to compete for a contract under the 1921 French government 1921 C.1 (single seat fighter) programme. It was a wooden shoulder wing monoplane with a low aspect ratio, thick section wing. This was built around two spars and was braced from below on each side by an N-form strut from the spars, at 60% span, to the lower fuselage; its midsection was on top of the fuselage. There was no dihedral.

The fighter was powered by a 220 kW (300 hp) Hispano-Suiza 8Fb water-cooled V-8 engine. Its radiator was centrally mounted under the engine, oriented edge on. A pair of fixed and synchronized 7.7 mm (0.303 in) Vickers machine guns fired through the propeller disc. The fuselage was flat sided, though with curved upper decking. Its open cockpit placed the pilot in a cut-out in the trailing edge at about wing level, with a small head-rest fairing behind him. At the rear the empennage was conventional, with a straight tapered horizontal tail including split elevators placed on top of the fuselage. The fin was triangular and the rudder rounded, extending down to the keel. None of the control surfaces were aerodynamically balanced.

The de Marçay 4 had a conventional fixed tailskid undercarriage, with mainwheels on a single axle mounted on a pair of V-form struts from the lower fuselage.

The fighter was built in five months and first flew in 1923. At the programme trials it was criticised for its pilot's poor forward and downward fields of view and no production order was received.

== Specifications ==
Data from Green & Swanborough (1994)

General characteristics

- Crew: one
- Length: 6.7 m (22 ft 0 in)
- Wingspan: 10.0 m (32 ft 10 in)
- Wing area: 20.0 m^{2} (215 sq ft)
- Empty weight: 810 kg (1,786 lb)
- Gross weight: 1,150 kg (2,535 lb)
- Powerplant: 1 × Hispano-Suiza 8Fb V-8, watercooled, 220 kW (300 hp)
- Propellers: 2-bladed

Performance

- Maximum speed: 279 km/h (173 mph, 151 kn) at sea level

Armament

- 2 × 7.7 mm (0.303 in) Vickers machine guns, fixed and synchronized.
