= Denel SARA =

Proposed Small African Regional Aircraft

The Denel SARA (Small African Regional Aircraft) is a projected 24-passenger turboprop regional airliner with rough field capabilities. The project was announced at the Africa Aerospace and Defence exhibition in September 2014, by the state-owned defence industrial group Denel. The project has a goal of permitting landings at fields with runways shorter than 1,000m, of which there are more than 460 in South Africa alone.

== Design and development ==
The SARA project originated in 2012 when a SARA Steering Committee, co-chaired by the CEOs of Denel Aerostructures SOC Ltd and Denel Aviation, was set up. Various options were considered. A high wing configuration was selected for SARA to meet the issue of foreign object debris, for example stones thrown up by the propellers during landing, taking off and taxiing.

SARA will have a degree of STOL capability, but will not be optimised for STOL operations as it affects other performance parameters negatively. It will be certified under Part 25 of the US Federal Aviation Regulations (FAR 25) with up to 24 seats. It is now in a concept design phase based on market research.

Three versions of the SARA are planned – an airliner version with 24 passengers; a combi version able to carry 12 passengers and one LD2 cargo pallet; and a freight version able to transport three LD2 pallets. It is planned to have a maximum takeoff weight of 8,400 kilograms (18,519 lb) and a pressurised cabin.

Preliminary and detailed design stages are still to come with no final design yet. Denel is currently building a full-size mock-up of the SARA to be used as a test rig to check the ease of ingress and egress of passengers; seating layouts; internal cabin arrangements; basic cockpit arrangements; and other parameters. The development phase was expected to last five years, with a prototype aircraft to be manufactured by 2020 or 2021. However, as of late 2021, no prototype has been publicly reported and Denel is reported lack capital to continue full operations.
