= Dalotel DM-165 =

French monoplane

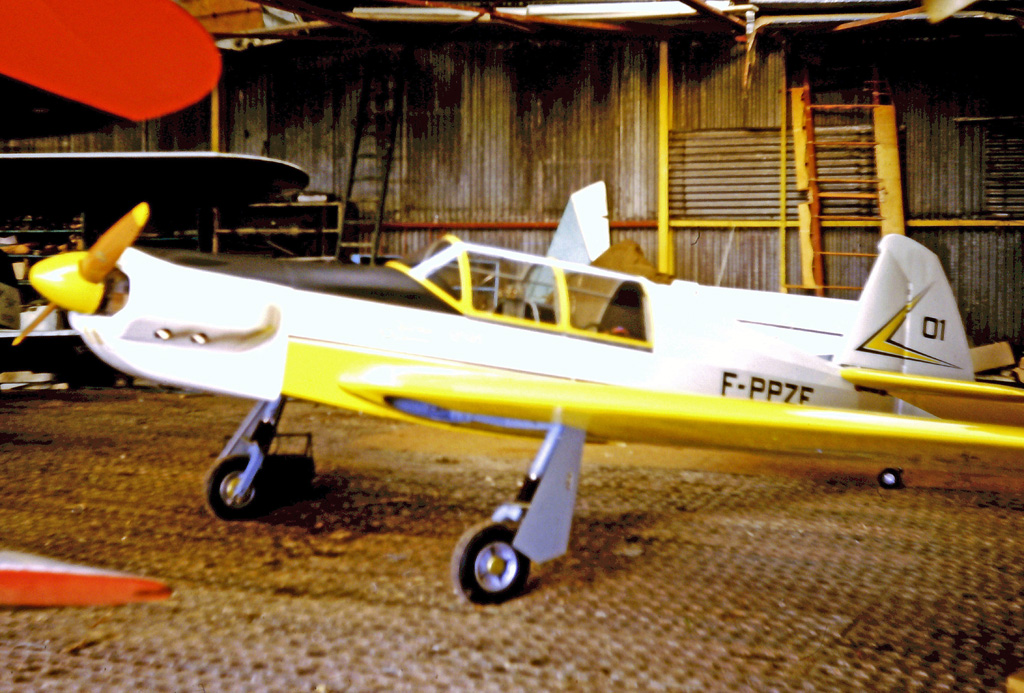
- The sole DM-165 at Meaux-Esbly airfield near Paris in June 1969

General information
- Type: Two-seat training monoplane
- National origin: France
- Manufacturer: Société Poulet
- Designer: Michel Dalotel
- Number built: 1

History
- First flight: 1969

The Dalotel DM-165 was a French two-seat training monoplane designed by Michel Dalotel. A number of variants were proposed but only the prototype was built.

== Design and development ==
The DM-165 was a tandem two-seat low-wing monoplane. Powered by a 165 hp (121 kW) Continental IO-346A flat-four piston engine. It had a tailwheel and retractable landing gear which folded inwards. Dalotel was assisted by Société Poulet in the construction of the prototype, registered F-PPZE, which was first flown in April 1969. The aircraft was successfully tested during 1970 but despite efforts to market the aircraft none were ordered.

== Variants ==
DM-165
Prototype with retractable landing gear and powered by a 165 hp (121 kW) Continental IO-346A piston engine, one built.
DM-125 Club
Proposed variant with fixed landing gear and powered by a 125 hp (92 kW) engine, not built.
DM-160 Club
Proposed variant with fixed landing gear and powered by a 160 hp (118 kW) engine, not built.
DM-160 Professional
Proposed variant of the DM-160 with retractable landing gear and constant speed propeller, not built.

== Specifications (DM-165) ==
Data from

General characteristics

- Crew: two
- Length: 6.96 m (22 ft 10 in)
- Wingspan: 8.40 m (27 ft 6.75 in)
- Height: 1.76 m (5 ft 9.25 in)
- Wing area: 12.30 m^{2} (132.40 sq ft)
- Powerplant: 1 × Continental IO-346A flat-four piston engine , 121 kW (165 hp)

Performance

- Maximum speed: 300 km/h (186 mph, 162 kn)
