= Daytona Aircraft D-200 =

Series of American training aircraft developed by Daytona Aircraft

D-200

General information
- Type: Training aircraft
- National origin: United States
- Manufacturer: Daytona Aircraft

History
- Introduction date: 1991 Sun 'n Fun airshow

The Daytona Aircraft D-200 is one of a series of American training aircraft developed in the 1990s by Daytona Aircraft.

== Development ==
The DA-200 is a two place side-by-side configuration, low wing aircraft with tricycle landing gear and gull wing doors. It features a double tapered wing, similar to a Mooney 201, and a swept tail with dorsal fin similar to a Cessna 172. The aircraft uses all aluminum construction. It was the first demonstrated in a line of aircraft intended to be built in Fargo, North Dakota. The producers hoped to capitalize on the lack of prior manufacturing liability.

== Variants ==
D-160
D-180
D-200
Two seat prototype
D-250
D-270
D-300

== Specifications (D-200) ==
Data from Jane's All The World's Aircraft 1992–93

General characteristics

- Crew: 1
- Capacity: 3 passengers
- Length: 25 ft 11 in (7.90 m)
- Wingspan: 36 ft 0 in (10.97 m)
- Height: 7 ft 8 in (2.34 m)
- Wing area: 162.8 sq ft (15.12 m^{2})
- Aspect ratio: 7.96:1
- Empty weight: 1,250 lb (567 kg)
- Max takeoff weight: 2,500 lb (1,134 kg)
- Powerplant: 1 × Lycoming horizontally opposed piston aircraft engine, 200 hp (150 kW)
- Propellers: 2-bladed

Performance

- Maximum speed: 175 kn (201 mph, 324 km/h)
- Cruise speed: 165 kn (190 mph, 306 km/h) (75% power)
- Stall speed: 51 kn (59 mph, 94 km/h) (flaps and undercarriage down)
- Range: 1,275 nmi (1,467 mi, 2,361 km)
- Endurance: 7 hr 44 min
- Service ceiling: 18,000 ft (5,500 m)
- g limits: +6 -3
- Rate of climb: 1,000 ft/min (5.1 m/s)
- Take-off to 50 ft (15 m): 1,319 feet (402 m)
- Landing from 50 ft (15 m): 1,220 feet (370 m)

== See also ==
Aircraft of comparable role, configuration, and era

- Meyers 200
