= Lamco Eurocub =

Hungarian ultralight aircraft

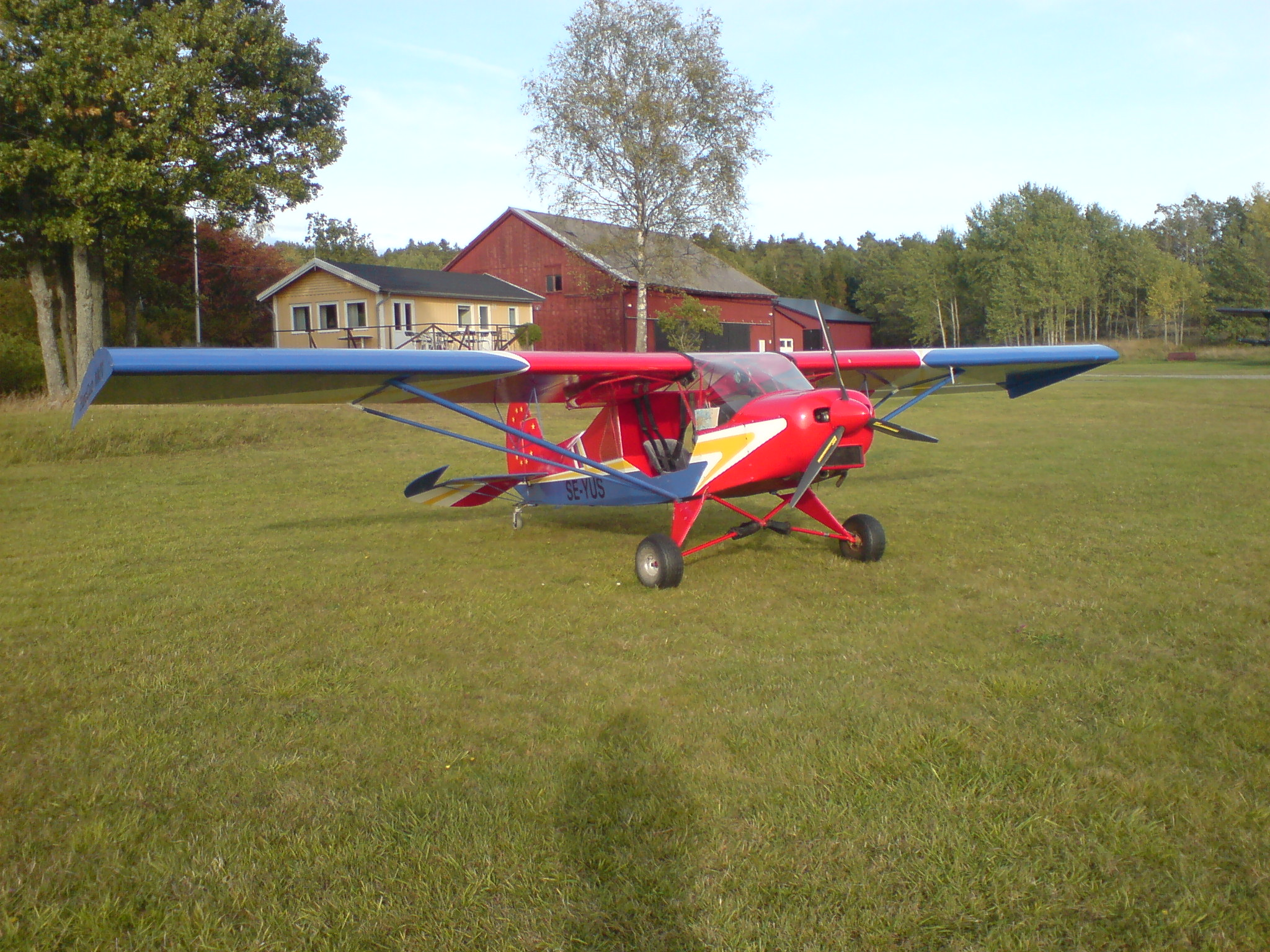

General information
- Type: Fixed wing ultralight aircraft
- Manufacturer: Danex Engineering Kft
- Status: Out of production

The Lamco Eurocub is a Hungarian ultralight aircraft with fixed conventional landing gear, manufactured by Danex Engineering Kft. It is used primarily for flight training, touring and personal flying.

The aircraft is currently not in production and a purchaser for the design, jigs and rights is being sought.

== Design and development ==
The Lamco Eurocub is a single-engined, high-wing monoplane with two seats in side-by-side configuration. The Eurocub is manufactured with either an 80 hp (60 kW) Rotax 912 UL engine or a 100 hp (75 kW) Rotax 912 ULS engine. The engine drives the propeller, which has ground-adjustable pitch, through a gearbox with a 2.43:1 reduction ratio.

The aircraft's fuselage, stabilizers, rudders and landing gear are constructed of welded steel tubes. The wing spars are made of extruded Dural 6061-T6 aluminium. The aircraft is covered in Ceconite aircraft fabric covering. The firewall is made of stainless steel.

== Specifications (Eurocub Mk IV) ==
Data from Pilot's operating handbook

General characteristics

- Crew: one
- Capacity: one passenger
- Length: 5.70 m (18 ft 8 in)
- Wingspan: 9.55 m (31 ft 4 in)
- Wing area: 14.00 m^{2} (150.7 sq ft)
- Gross weight: 450 kg (992 lb)
- Fuel capacity: 82 litres (18 imp gal; 22 US gal)
- Powerplant: 1 × Rotax 912UL four cylinder, liquid and air-cooled, four stroke aircraft engine, 60 kW (80 hp)
- Propellers: 3-bladed Warp Drive Inc or Ivoprop carbon fiber laminate with on-the-ground-adjustable pitch., 1.73 m (5 ft 8 in) diameter

Performance

- Stall speed: 61 km/h (38 mph, 33 kn)
- Never exceed speed: 200 km/h (130 mph, 110 kn)
