= Dewoitine D.30 =

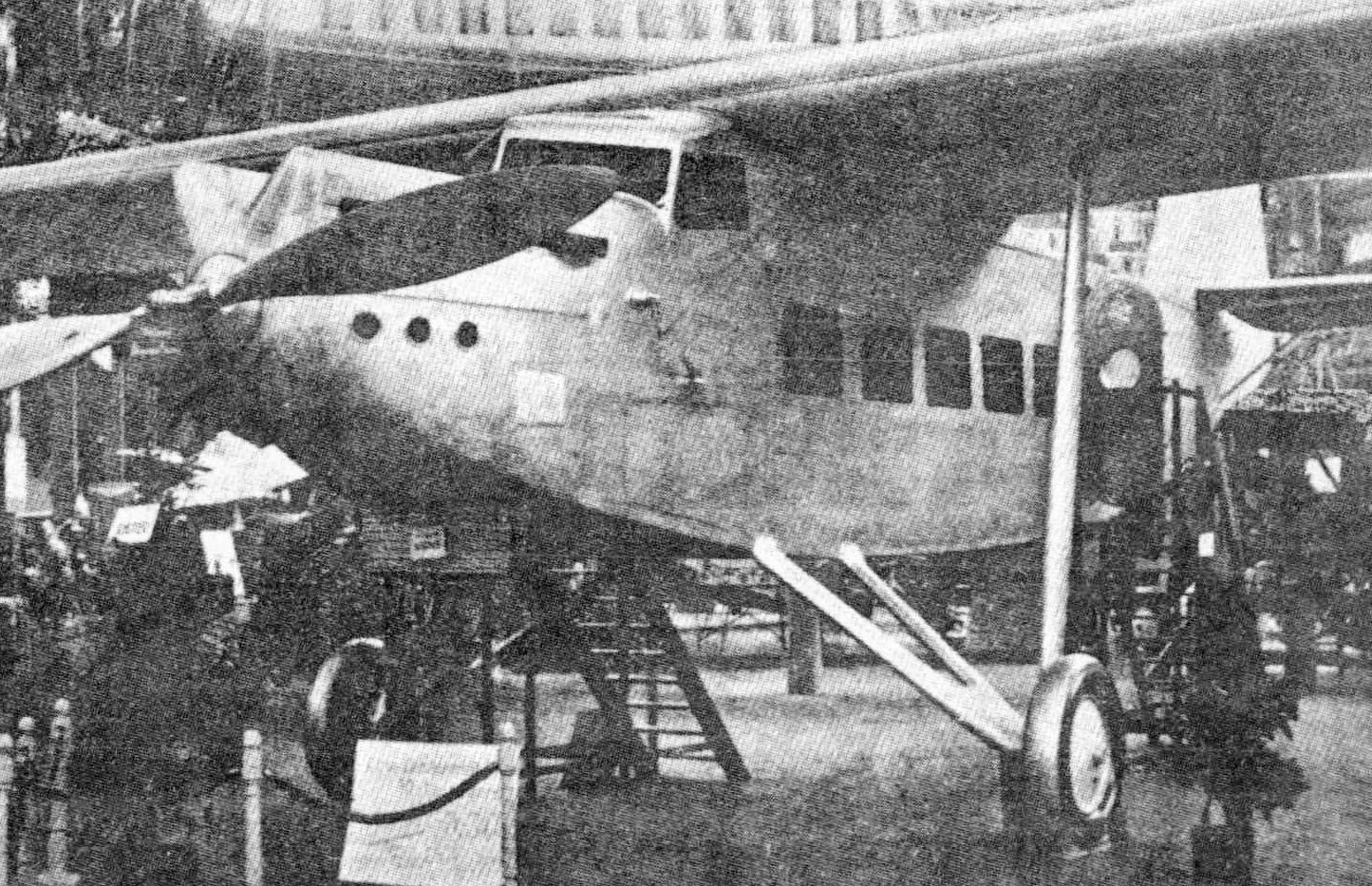

General information
- Type: France
- National origin: Ten-seat passenger transport
- Manufacturer: Sociéty Aéronautique Dewoitine
- Number built: Two

History
- First flight: 21 May 1931

The Dewoitine D.30 was a ten-seat cantilever monoplane built in France in 1930. The D.30 was a single-engine aircraft but the second was completed as a trimotor and redesignated D.31.

== Design and development ==
The Dewoitine D.30 first appeared in public at the Paris Aero Show in December 1930. It was a single-engine, ten-seat passenger aircraft with a high cantilever wing and rectangular-section fuselage. It had a fabric-covered metal frame and was powered by a 485 kW (650 hp) Hispano-Suiza 12Nbr water cooled, upright V-12 engine. This engine was closely cowled, the cowling following the profile of the two cylinder banks, and drove a two-blade propeller; it was cooled with a Lamblin radiator mounted ventrally at its rear.

The empennage of the D.30 was conventional, with the strut-braced tailplane mounted on top of the fuselage. The rear control surfaces were unbalanced; the rudder reached down to the bottom of the fuselage, moving in a cutout between the elevators. The single main wheels of the undercarriage were mounted on pairs of V-form struts joined to the lower fuselage longerons, with near-vertical shock absorber legs attached to the wing. A tailskid completed the conventional landing gear.

The D.30 first flew on 21 May 1931. A second prototype followed but was modified into a trimotor aircraft, designated the Dewoitine D.31 and powered by three Hispano-Suiza 9Q nine-cylinder radial engines. The outer engines were each mounted well below the wing via two pairs of struts. Apart from the three engines and a consequent increase in weight and slight reduction in length, the D.31 was very similar to the D.30. It first flew on 12 January 1932, initially powered by the 172 kW (230 hp) 9Qa engine variant. In 1935 these were replaced by 240 kW (320 hp) 9Qbs. In this form the outer engines remained uncowled but the central one had a long chord NACA cowling.

== Operational history ==
The D.31 was owned by the Centre d'Essais de Matériels Aériens (CEMA) at Villacoublay. it remained registered there in June 1935 but had gone two years later, prompting speculation that it may have been used by Republican forces in the Spanish Civil War.

== Variants ==
D.30

- Single-engine first prototype. Empty weight 2,476 kg (5,457 lb), gross weight 4,486 kg (9,890 lb).

D.31

- Three-engine second prototype.

== Specifications (D.31) ==
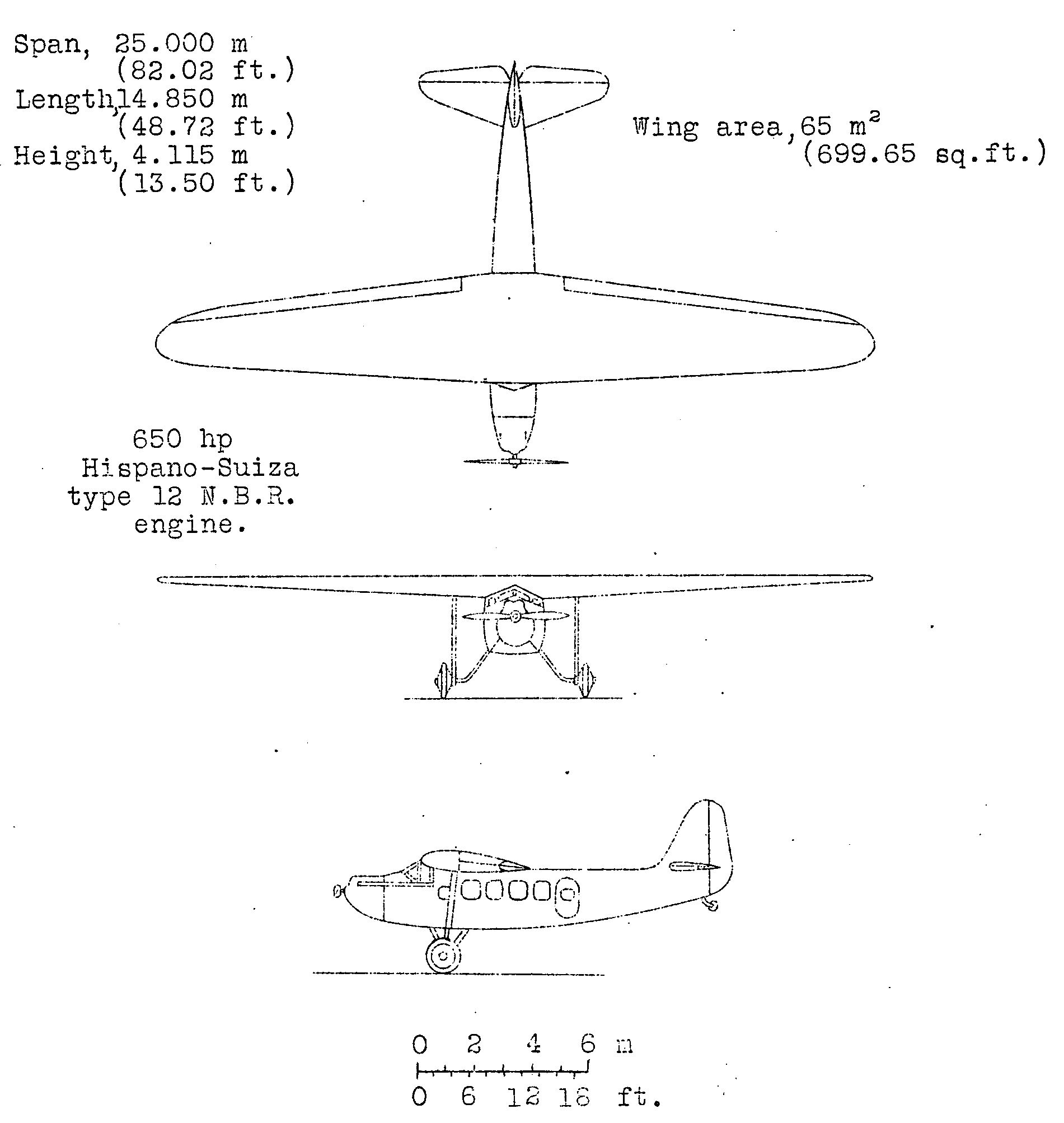
Dewoitine D.30 3-view drawing from NACA Aircraft Circular No.135

Data from Howson

General characteristics

- Crew: two
- Capacity: ten passengers
- Length: 14.89 m (48 ft 10 in)
- Wingspan: 24.99 m (82 ft 0 in)
- Height: 4.15 m (13 ft 7 in)
- Wing area: 69.0 m^{2} (743 sq ft)
- Empty weight: 3,273 kg (7,216 lb)
- Gross weight: 5,280 kg (11,640 lb)
- Powerplant: 3 × Hispano-Suiza 9Qb 9-cylinder radial, 240 kW (320 hp) each these were fitted in 1935. It is not certain if these or the lower powered Qa variant initially used provided the performance shown below.

Performance

- Maximum speed: 235 km/h (146 mph, 127 kn)
- Cruise speed: 182 km/h (113 mph, 98 kn)
- Range: 860 km (530 mi, 460 nmi)
- Service ceiling: 6,000 m (20,000 ft)
