= D'Apuzzo Senior Aero Sport =

PJ-260, D-260, D-295, D-200, D-201

General information
- Type: Aerobatic biplane
- Manufacturer: Homebuilt
- Designer: Nick D'Apuzzo
- Number built: at least 32 by 1985

History
- First flight: 1962

The Parsons-Jocelyn PJ-260 was an aerobatic biplane aircraft built in the United States to participate in the 1962 World Aerobatic Championships in Budapest. It served as the prototype for a family of closely related aircraft produced under designer Nick D'Apuzzo's name as the D-260 and D-295 Senior Aero Sport', D-200 Junior Aero Sport and the D-201 Sportwing which were marketed for homebuilding. The original PJ-260 was named for the pilots who commissioned the aircraft and hoped to compete with it, Lindsey Parsons and Rod Jocelyn. The PJ-260 and its derivatives were conventional short-coupled biplanes with fixed tailwheel undercarriage. The single-bay, equal-span wings (unequal-span on D-295) were staggered and braced with N-struts, and the outer panels of the upper wing were swept back. The fuselage construction was of fabric over a steel-tube framework, and the wings were of fabric-covered wooden spars and metal ribs.

== Variants ==
PJ-260

D-295 Senior Aero Sport
A two-seat derivative of the original PJ-260 that was marketed to home builders from the mid-1960s onwards. Early examples were distinguished as D-260 for those powered by the same 260 hp Lycoming O-435 engine that powered the PJ-260, while D-295 indicated those powered by the 295 hp Lycoming O-480. Later, this distinction became less meaningful, with D-260s produced with engines of up to 300 hp.

D-200 Junior Aero Sport
A slightly scaled-down version of the PJ-260, designed to use a 180 hp Lycoming O-360. Work on two prototypes commenced in 1964, but was not completed by the time the more complete of the machines was damaged in a fire in 1973. Work resumed in 1975, but was suspended in favour of the D-201 Sportwing.

D-260

D-201 Sportwing
Like the D-260, a two-seater. It was developed in 1977 with the intention of simplifying construction of the aircraft for homebuilders, as well as reducing the weight of the design. The prototype flew in or around 1981, and five sets of plans had sold by 1984.

== Specifications (typical D-260) ==
Data from Sport Aviation Jan 1966

General characteristics

- Crew: one pilot
- Capacity: one passenger
- Length: 21 ft 0 in (6.40 m)
- Wingspan: 27 ft 0 in (8.23 m)
- Height: 7 ft 8 in (2.32 m)
- Wing area: 185 sq ft (17.2 m^{2})
- Gross weight: 2,150 lb (975 kg)
- Powerplant: 1 × Lycoming GO-435-C2 six-cylinder horizontally opposed piston engine , 260 hp (194 kW)

Performance

- Maximum speed: 155 mph (250 km/h, 135 kn)
- Cruise speed: 125 mph (201 km/h, 109 kn)
- Range: 500 mi (800 km, 430 nmi)
- Service ceiling: 20,000 ft (6,100 m)

== See also ==
Aircraft of comparable role, configuration, and era

- Stolp Starduster
