= Dätwyler =

Swiss manufacturing company

MDC Max Dätwyler AG
- Industry: Aerospace, Manufacturing
- Founded: 1943
- Headquarters: Bleienbach (canton of Bern), Switzerland
- Key people: Max Dätwyler, founder

MDC Max Dätwyler AG is a Swiss manufacturing company established at Dietlikon in 1943, and which relocated to Bleienbach in 1951. Originally, the firm undertook the manufacture and repair of tools and machinery. Aircraft maintenance became an area of specialty, and Dätwyler built two aircraft of its own in the 1960s (based on existing designs by other manufacturers) before developing its own design, the Swiss Trainer that flew in 1983 and has since entered mass production in Malaysia. Dätwyler's main business, however, became machinery for the printing industry, branching into electromechanical and laser engraving.

== Aircraft ==
- Datwyler Trailer
- SME Aero Tiga
