= Dakota Cub Super 18 =

American light aircraft

Super 18
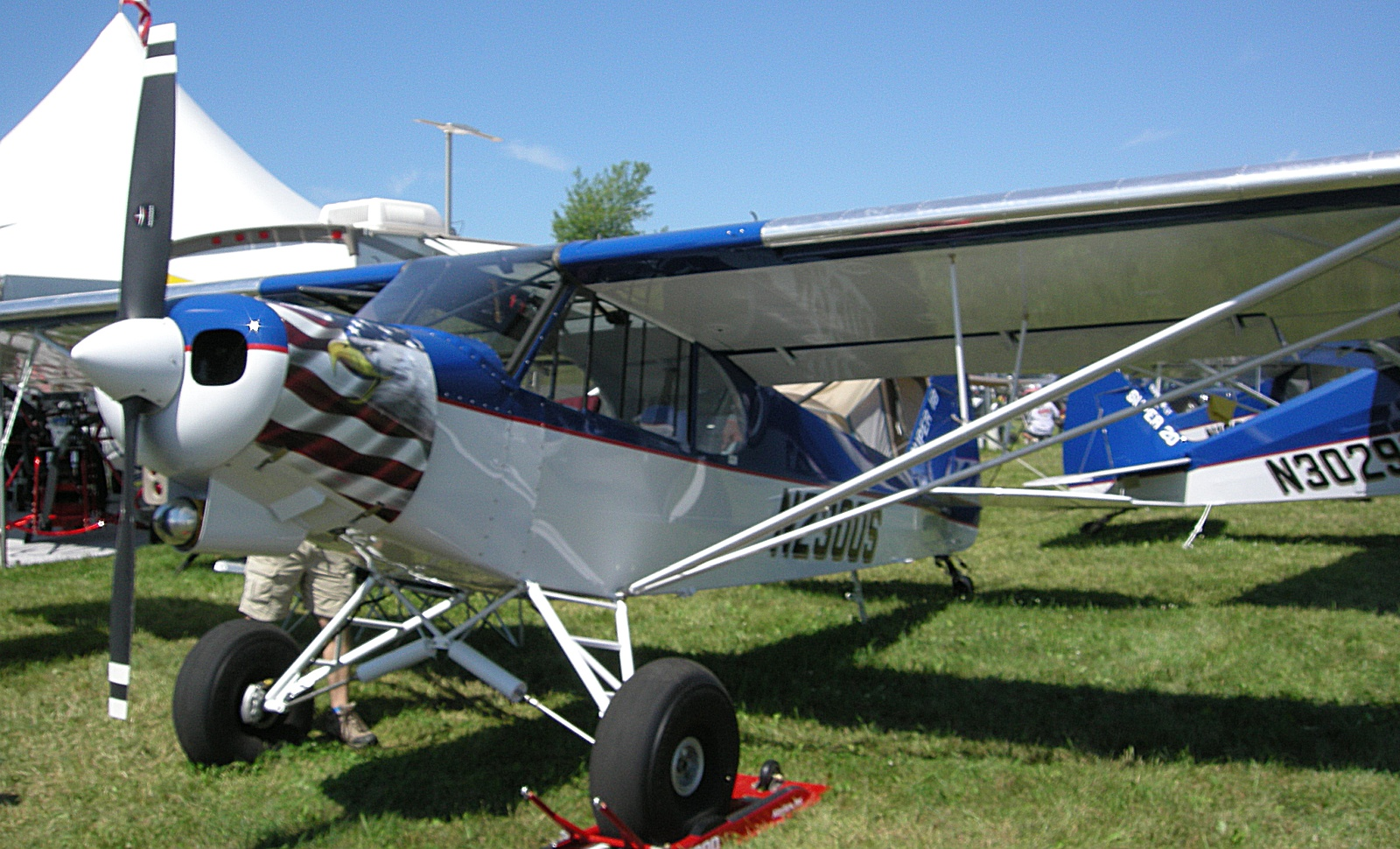

General information
- Type: Amateur-built aircraft
- National origin: United States
- Manufacturer: Dakota Cub
- Status: In production (2012)
- Number built: 8 (all models, 2011)

History
- Developed from: Super 18 Model S18-180

The Dakota Cub Super 18 is an American amateur-built aircraft, designed and produced by Dakota Cub of Sioux Falls, South Dakota. The aircraft is supplied as a kit for amateur construction.

== Design and development ==
The Super 18 is the kit derivative of the type certified Super 18 Model S18-180 that is manufactured by a separate, but affiliated company, Super 18. The Dakota Cub Super 18 features a strut-braced high wing, a two-seats-in-tandem enclosed cockpit that is 28 in (71 cm) wide, fixed conventional landing gear and a single engine in tractor configuration.

The aircraft fuselage is made from welded 4130 steel tubing, with the wing structure of aluminum sheet and all surfaces covered in doped aircraft fabric. The wings are supported by "V" struts and jury struts. Dimensions and engines vary with specific model. Construction time for all models from the supplied kit is 900 hours.

== Variants ==
Super 18-160-EXP
Model with a 35.4 ft (10.8 m) span wing with an area of 175 sq ft (16.3 m^{2}) and a gross weight of 2,050 lb (929.9 kg). This model's recommended engine power range is 160 to 180 hp (119 to 134 kW) and the standard engine used is the 160 hp (119 kW) Lycoming O-320 four-stroke powerplant. One reported completed by December 2011.
Super 18-180-EXP
Model with a 36 ft (11.0 m) span wing with an area of 189 sq ft (17.6 m^{2}) and a gross weight of 2,300 lb (1,043.3 kg). This model's recommended engine power is 180 hp (134 kW) and the standard engine used is the 180 hp (134 kW) Lycoming O-360 four-stroke powerplant. Six reported completed by December 2011.
Super 18-LT-EXP
Model with a 35 ft (10.7 m) span wing with an area of 175 sq ft (16.3 m^{2}) and a gross weight of 1,320 lb (598.7 kg) for the US light-sport aircraft category. This model's recommended engine power range is 90 to 180 hp (67 to 134 kW) and the standard engine used is the 100 hp (75 kW) Lycoming IO-233 four-stroke powerplant. One reported completed by December 2011.

== Specifications (Super 18-180-EXP) ==
Data from Kitplanes

General characteristics

- Crew: one
- Capacity: one passenger
- Length: 23 ft (7.0 m)
- Wingspan: 36 ft (11 m)
- Wing area: 189 sq ft (17.6 m^{2})
- Empty weight: 1,250 lb (567 kg)
- Gross weight: 2,300 lb (1,043 kg)
- Fuel capacity: 46 U.S. gallons (170 L; 38 imp gal)
- Powerplant: 1 × Lycoming O-360 four cylinder, air-cooled, four stroke aircraft engine, 180 hp (130 kW)
- Propellers: 2-bladed metal

Performance

- Cruise speed: 100 mph (160 km/h, 87 kn)
- Stall speed: 51 mph (82 km/h, 44 kn)
- Range: 400 mi (640 km, 350 nmi)
- Rate of climb: 800 ft/min (4.1 m/s)
