= Délémontez-Desjardins D.01 =

1980s French aircraft

D.01 Ibis

General information
- Type: Ultralight monoplane
- National origin: France
- Manufacturer: Jacques Desjardins
- Designer: Jean Délémontez

History
- First flight: 12 June 1985
- Developed from: Jodel D.11

The Délémontez-Desjardins D.01 'Ibis' is a French ultralight monoplane designed by Jean Délémontez for amateur construction, derived from the Jodel D.11.

== Specifications ==
Data from Les Avions Français de 1965 a 1990

General characteristics

- Crew: 1 or 2
- Capacity: 1 or 2 pax
- Length: 6.3 m (20 ft 8 in)
- Wingspan: 8.22 m (27 ft 0 in)
- Wing area: 12.75 m^{2} (137.2 sq ft)
- Empty weight: 357 kg (787 lb)
- Gross weight: 617 kg (1,360 lb)
- Powerplant: 1 × Lycoming O-235 4-cylinder air-cooled horizontally-opposed piston engine, 75 kW (100 hp)
- Propellers: 2-bladed variable-pitch propeller

Performance

- Maximum speed: 200 km/h (120 mph, 110 kn)
- Cruise speed: 185 km/h (115 mph, 100 kn)
- Endurance: 3 hours
- Service ceiling: 4,000 m (13,000 ft)
