= Nick D'Apuzzo =

American aircraft designer

Nicholas E. D'Apuzzo was an American aircraft designer. He worked at the Naval Air Development Center as a project manager until his retirement in 1973. His most noteworthy projects were racing and aerobatic aircraft that he developed privately, in particular the Parsons-Jocelyn PJ-260 and its various derivatives that were marketed for homebuilding.
