= Davis DA-5 =

DA-5

General information
- Type: Sport aircraft
- Manufacturer: Homebuilt
- Designer: Leeon D. Davis

History
- First flight: 22 July 1974

The Davis DA-5, a.k.a. DA-5A, is a single-seat sport aircraft designed in the United States in the 1970s and marketed for homebuilding. Like designer Leeon D. Davis's successful DA-2, it is a low-wing monoplane with fixed tricycle undercarriage and a V-tail, but with a much narrower fuselage accommodating only the pilot, and a lengthened nose. Design work was carried out in 1972, but the prototype was not built until 1974, when it was completed in only 67 days.

== Specifications ==
Data from Jane's All the World's Aircraft 1976–77

General characteristics

- Crew: 1
- Length: 15 ft 9 in (4.80 m)
- Wingspan: 15 ft 7 1/4 in (4.756 m)
- Height: 4 ft 5 1/4 in (1.353 m)
- Wing area: 57.20 sq ft (5.314 m^{2})
- Aspect ratio: 4.26:1
- Airfoil: Clark Y
- Empty weight: 460 lb (209 kg)
- Max takeoff weight: 775 lb (352 kg)
- Fuel capacity: 17 US gal (14 imp gal; 64 L)
- Powerplant: 1 × Continental A65 horizontally-opposed four-cylinder piston engine, 65 hp (48 kW)
- Propellers: 2-bladed Hegy type 60-70 fixed pitch wooden propeller, 5 ft 0 in (1.52 m) diameter

Performance

- Maximum speed: 160 mph (260 km/h, 140 kn) at sea level
- Cruise speed: 120 mph (190 km/h, 100 kn) (econ. cruise)
- Stall speed: 60 mph (97 km/h, 52 kn)
- Never exceed speed: 170 mph (270 km/h, 150 kn)
- Range: 450 mi (720 km, 390 nmi)
- Service ceiling: 14,500 ft (4,400 m)
- Rate of climb: 800 ft/min (4.1 m/s)
- Takeoff run to 50 ft (15 m): 850 ft (260 m)
- Landing run from 50 ft (15 m): 1,100 ft (340 m)
