= Dempsey TD-3 Beta Lightning =

TD-3 Beta Lightning

General information
- Type: Homebuilt aircraft
- National origin: United States
- Designer: Thomas L. Dempsey
- Number built: 1

History
- First flight: 14 September 1969

The Dempsey TD-3 Beta Lightning is the second original homebuilt aeroplane design by Thomas Dempsey.

== Design and development ==
The TD-3 was built with the design goals of being strong, comfortable and fast. The twin boom, twin engine design was loosely based on the Lockheed P-38 Lightning planform.

The TD-3 Beta Lightning is a twin boom, twin engine, tricycle gear monoplane with side-by-side configuration seating. The wooden spar wings are fabric covered. The fuselage pod is all fiberglass. The landing gear mechanism is sourced from a Piper Aztec, with the retraction mechanism retracting rearward rather than forward as on the Aztec. Four wing fuel tanks are mounted internally. The fuselage and tail booms have a supported welded steel tube frame with aluminum stringers.

== Specifications (TD-3 Beta Lightning) ==
Data from Sport Aviation

General characteristics

- Crew: 2
- Length: 21 ft (6.4 m)
- Wingspan: 30 ft (9.1 m)
- Height: 5 ft 6 in (1.68 m)
- Wing area: 109 sq ft (10.1 m^{2})
- Airfoil: NACA 65-415 tapering to a NACA 4412
- Empty weight: 1,896 lb (860 kg)
- Gross weight: 2,834 lb (1,285 kg)
- Fuel capacity: 72 U.S. gallons (270 L; 60 imp gal)
- Powerplant: 2 × Lycoming IO-320 horizontally-opposed piston aircraft engines, 160 hp (120 kW) each
- Propellers: 2-bladed Hartzell Propeller, 6 ft 0 in (1.83 m) diameter

Performance

- Maximum speed: 188 kn (216 mph, 348 km/h)
- Stall speed: 72 kn (83 mph, 134 km/h)
- Range: 830 nmi (950 mi, 1,530 km)
- Rate of climb: 3,000 ft/min (15 m/s)
- Wing loading: 26 lb/sq ft (130 kg/m^{2})

== See also ==
Aircraft of comparable role, configuration, and era

- Wing Derringer Two passenger twin engine.
- Rutan Boomerang Composite twin engine homebuilt
