= Dayton-Wright Cabin Cruiser =

KT Cabin Cruiser
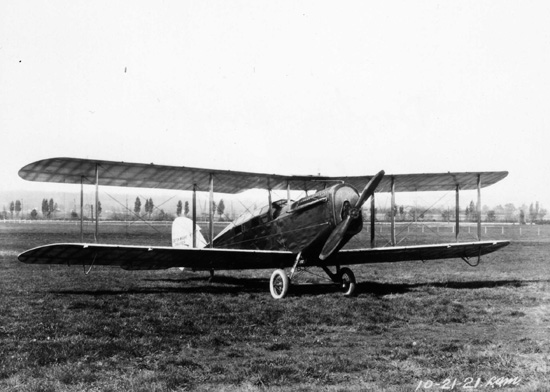

General information
- Type: Three-seat touring aircraft
- Manufacturer: Dayton-Wright Airplane Company

History
- First flight: 1921
- Developed from: de Havilland DH.4

The Dayton-Wright KT Cabin Cruiser was a 1920s American three-seat touring aircraft built by the Dayton-Wright Airplane Company in Dayton, Ohio. Often known as the "Honeymoon Express", it was one of several civilian aircraft the company developed from the de Havilland DH.4.

== Design and development ==
The Dayton-Wright Airplane Company had built 3,106 de Havilland DH.4s under license during the First World War. After the war ended, the company looked to develop civil transports. The resulting KT Cabin Cruiser was a standard production DH.4 with a glazed enclosure for two passengers in tandem-seat configuration in the front, and a pilot in the rear, under a continuous glazed canopy.

== Specifications (KT Cabin Cruiser) ==
Data from The Illustrated Encyclopedia of Aircraft (Part Work 1982-1985).

General characteristics

- Crew: One
- Capacity: 2 passengers
- Length: 30 ft 1.5 in (9.18 m)
- Wingspan: 43 ft 7.5 in (13.30 m)
- Height: 11 ft 2.5 in (3.42 m)
- Wing area: 441.09 sq ft (40.98 m^{2})
- Empty weight: 2,686 lb (1,218 kg)
- Max takeoff weight: 4,128 lb (1,872 kg)
- Powerplant: 1 × Liberty 12 inline piston, 420 hp (313 kW)

Performance

- Maximum speed: 120 mph (193 km/h, 100 kn)

Armament

- Guns: one 0.293 in (7.45 mm) machine-gun

== See also ==
Aircraft of comparable role, configuration, and era

- Dayton-Wright OW.1 Aerial Coupe
