= De Marçay Passe-Partout =

French sport and touring aircraft

Passe-Partout
- Passe-Partout at the 1919 Paris Salon

General information
- Type: Light sporting aircraft
- National origin: France
- Manufacturer: SAECA Edmond de Marçay (Société Anonyme d'Etudes et de Construction Aéronautique Edmond de Marçay)
- Number built: 1

History
- First flight: Q1, 1920

The de Marçay Passe-Partout (French: [də maʁsɛ paspaʁtu]; lit. '"de Marçay Master-Key"') was a small, low-powered single-seat sport and touring aircraft built in France just after World War I.

== Design and development ==
The Passe-Partout was the smallest and lightest de Marçay aircraft of the three on display at the Paris Aero Salon of 1919. It had a very low power engine, the same 10 hp (7.5 kW) ABC 8 hp adapted flat-twin motorcycle engine that powered the English Electric Wren. Flight magazine doubted its practicality with this engine.

It was a single bay biplane with a single interplane strut on each side defining a bay braced with a single flying wire and a single landing wire. Both wings were two spar structures; there was marked forward stagger but no dihedral The interplane struts were slender at the top but smoothly widened towards their feet, linking the upper rear spar to both lower wing spars. The narrow upper joint provided a fixed point about which control wires could warp the trailing edge. Short cabane struts from the fuselage supported the centre of the upper wing.

The Passe-Partout had a monocoque fuselage of rounded rectangular cross-section. Its engine was mounted, with cylinders exposed, in the upper nose. The pilot's open cockpit placed him just aft of the upper trailing edge but over the lower wing because of the stagger. At the rear a plywood covered tailplane was mounted high on the fuselage and fitted with fabric covered elevators. Both the fin and rounded rudder were also ply covered. Its fixed landing gear was of the conventional tailskid type with mainwheels on a single axle rubber rubber sprung from a frame consisting of two V-form struts from the lower fuselage with a single cross-member.

The Passe-Partout hadn't yet flown when it appeared at the Paris Salon in December 1919 but it had flown by the following May. Marçay continued to advertise it until at least October 1920 but Flight's doubts about its practicality seem to have been justified for in May 1928, when the de Marçay company ceased to exist, Les Ailes noted that the Passe-Partout had undertaken only a few, inconclusive trials and further, that de Marçay himself saw it more of a curiosity than a practical aircraft.

== Specifications ==
Data from Flight, 13 May 1920

General characteristics

- Crew: one
- Length: 3.797 m (12 ft 5.5 in)
- Wingspan: 4.04 m (13 ft 3 in)
- Height: 1.37 m (4 ft 6 in)
- Wing area: 8.50 m^{2} (91.5 sq ft)
- Empty weight: 104 kg (230 lb)
- Gross weight: 189 kg (417 lb)
- Powerplant: 1 × ABC 8 hp flat-twin motorcycle engine, 7.5 kW (10 hp)
- Propellers: 2-bladed

Performance

- Maximum speed: 109 km/h (68 mph, 59 kn)
- Service ceiling: 1,000 m (3,300 ft)
