= Dayton-Wright Messenger =

T-4 Messenger
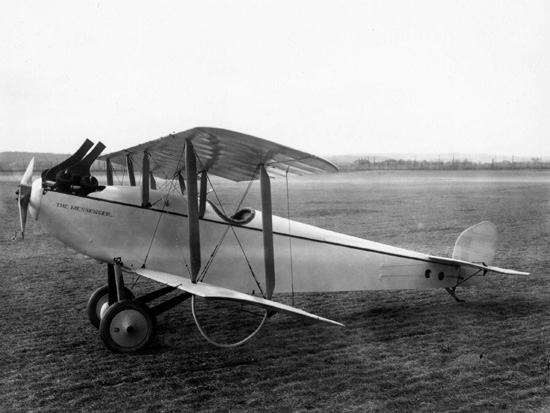

General information
- Type: Reconnaissance aircraft
- Manufacturer: Dayton-Wright
- Designer: Oliver Thomas
- Number built: 1

History
- First flight: 1918

The Dayton-Wright T-4 Messenger was a light, single-seat reconnaissance aircraft built in the United States by the Dayton-Wright Company in 1918 in the hope of gaining a production contract from the United States Army. It was a small conventional single-bay biplane with a neatly streamlined fuselage and staggered, equal-span wings. The undercarriage was of fixed tailskid type and the pilot sat in an open cockpit. Although diminutive, the design in fact started life as a scaled-up version of the Dayton-Wright Bug and shared a family resemblance to the de Havilland DH.4 that Dayton-Wright was building under licence during World War I. When the US Army was not interested in the aircraft, plans were made to sell it on the civil market, but these came to nothing and the prototype was the only example ever built.

== Specifications ==
Data from General Dynamics Aircraft and their Predecessors

General characteristics

- Crew: One (pilot)
- Length: 17 ft 6 in (5.33 m)
- Wingspan: 19 ft 3 in (5.87 m)
- Height: 6 ft 1 in (1.85 m)
- Wing area: 106 sq ft (9.8 m^{2})
- Empty weight: 385 lb (175 kg)
- Gross weight: 636 lb (288 kg)
- Powerplant: 1 × De Palma two-stroke V-4 engine, 37 hp (28 kW)

Performance

- Maximum speed: 85 mph (137 km/h, 74 kn)
- Endurance: 2.5 hours
- Time to altitude: 10 minutes to 3,000 ft (900 m)

== See also ==
Related lists

- List of military aircraft of the United States
