= Dayton-Wright FS =

American trainer aircraft

FS
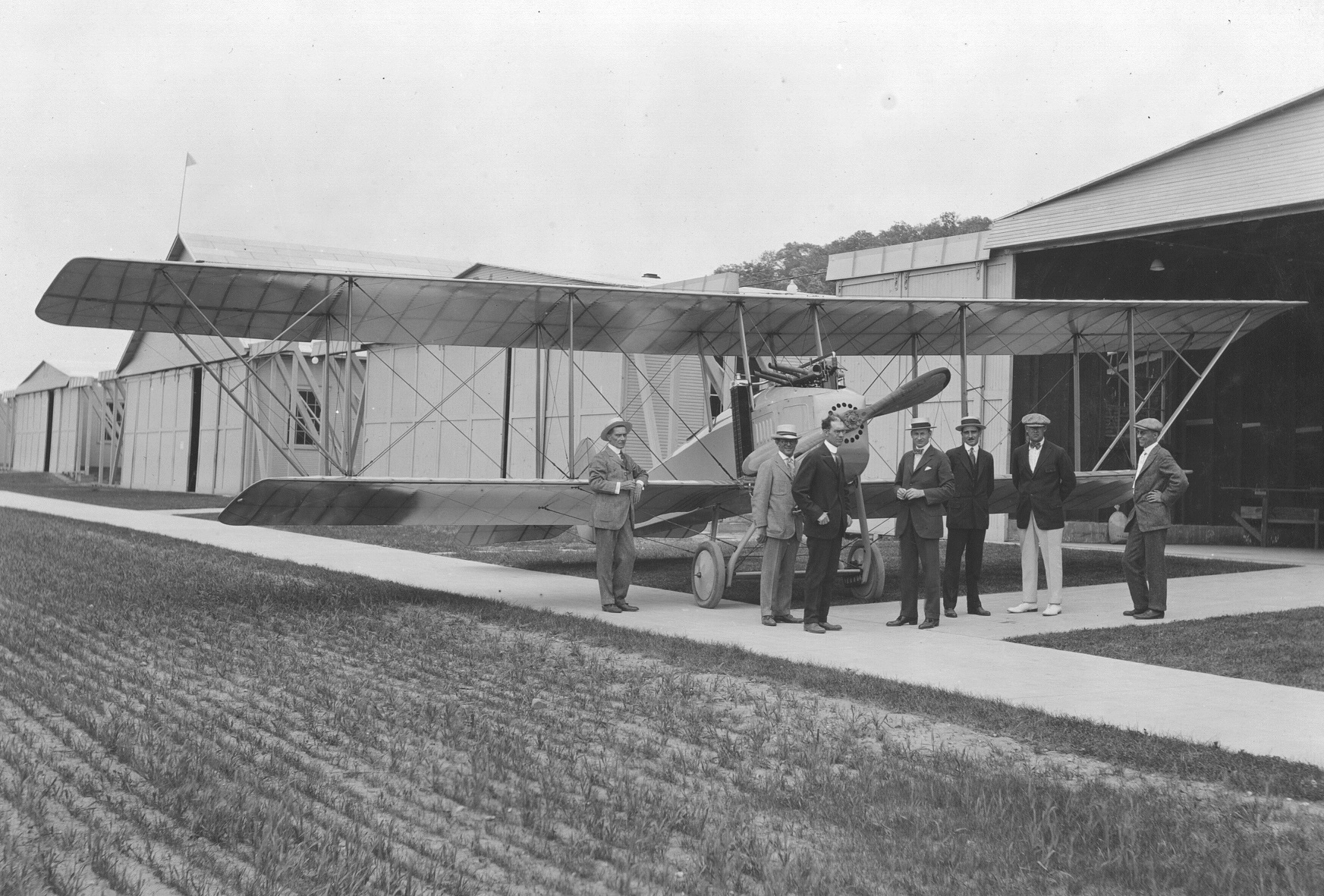
- Dayton-Wright FS being inspected at Wright Field. (Cropped)

General information
- Type: Trainer
- National origin: United States
- Manufacturer: Dayton-Wright Company
- Designer: Charles F. Kettering
- Number built: 2

History
- First flight: 1917

The Dayton-Wright FS was a two-seat trainer that first flew in 1917. This was the first aircraft manufactured by the Dayton-Wright Company. The FS was originally known as the 'first shot' since it was the company's 'first shot' at making an aircraft. Harold Talbott, Sr., the company's president, decided later to abbreviate it to FS.

== Design and development ==
Designed by Charles F. Kettering, the aircraft was a conventional tractor, tandem cockpit, two bay biplane powered by a Hall-Scott A-7a engine. Construction was of wood and fabric with the engine cowling and upper fuselage surfaces made of sheet metal. Two aircraft were completed, known as the FS-1 and FS-2. In 1918, the FS-2 was modified with the addition of radio equipment for testing by Dayton-Wright and later in 1918, was refitted with a 220 hp (160 kW) geared Wright-Hisso E.

== Operational history ==
Both these aircraft were delivered to Howard Rinehart's flying school, The Wright Field Company. This company provided flight training to both civilian and military aviators, including 41 Canadian pilots for the RFC and RNAS. These pilots would go on to win 19 combat decorations between them in the Great War. By the end of 1918, the Standard J-1 had replaced the FS for training and the two aircraft were returned to Dayton-Wright where they were used for testing purposes.

== Specifications (FS-1) ==
Data from Aerofiles

General characteristics

- Powerplant: 1 × Hall-Scott A-7a , 100 hp (75 kW)

Performance

- Maximum speed: 68 mph (109 km/h, 59 kn)
- Stall speed: 38 mph (61 km/h, 33 kn)
