= Hall-Scott A-7 =

Liquid-cooled straight-4 aircraft engine

A-7
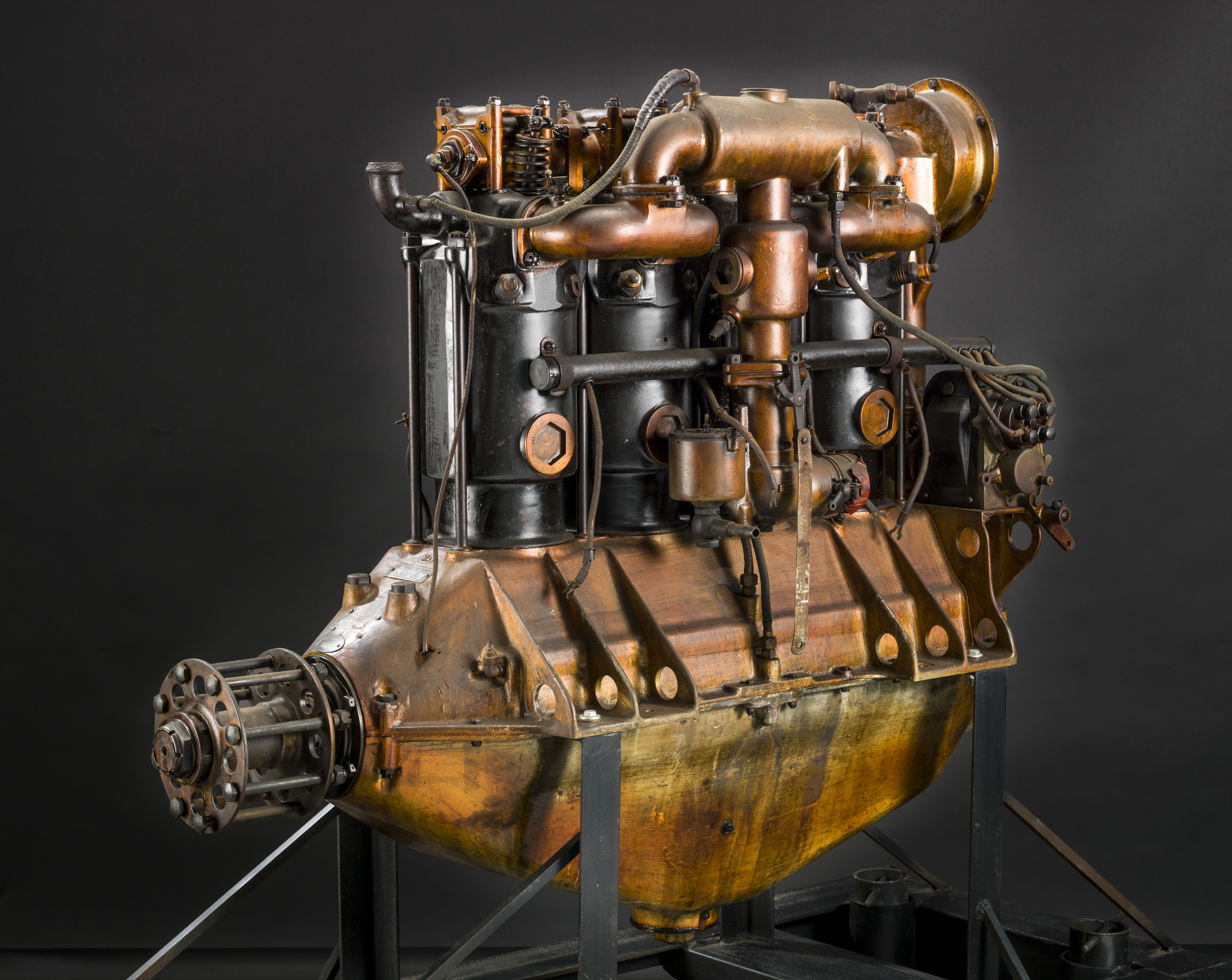
- Hall-Scott A-7a at the National Air and Space Museum
- Type: Piston aero engine
- National origin: United States of America
- Manufacturer: Hall-Scott Motor Car Company
- First run: 1910s

The Hall-Scott A-7 was an early liquid-cooled aircraft engine manufactured by the Hall-Scott company of Berkeley, California. Using a straight-4 configuration, the engine developed 90 horsepower (67 kW) as the A-7 and 100 horsepower (75 kW) as the A-7a. In service these engines suffered from reliability problems and were prone to catch fire while in operation.

== Variants ==
- A-7: The A-7 used the same cylinders as the earlier Hall-Scott A-5. Bore: 5 in (127.00 mm), stroke: 7 in (177.80 mm), displacement: 549.78 cu in (9.01 L), weight: 410 lb (190 kg), power: 90 hp (67 kW) at 1,400 rpm, weight: 410 lb (190 kg)
- A-7a: The A-7a used the same cylinders as the earlier Hall-Scott A-5a. 100 hp (75 kW) 5.25 in × 7 in (133 mm × 178 mm)

== Applications ==
- Aeromarine 39 (A-7a)
- Aeromarine M-1 (A-7a)
- Dayton-Wright FS (A-7a)
- Standard J-1

In 2017 about seven A-7a engines were still in use in Edwardian racing cars, mostly in the United Kingdom.

== Engines on display ==
- A Hall-Scott A-7a is on public display at the Canada Aviation and Space Museum.
- A Hall-Scott A-7a is on public display at the Aerospace Museum of California.
- A Hall-Scott A-7a is in ownership of the National Air and Space Museum.
- A Hall-Scott A-7a is on public display at the Museum of Flight.
- A Hall-Scott A-7a is on public display at the Hiller Aviation Museum.

== Specifications (A-7a) ==
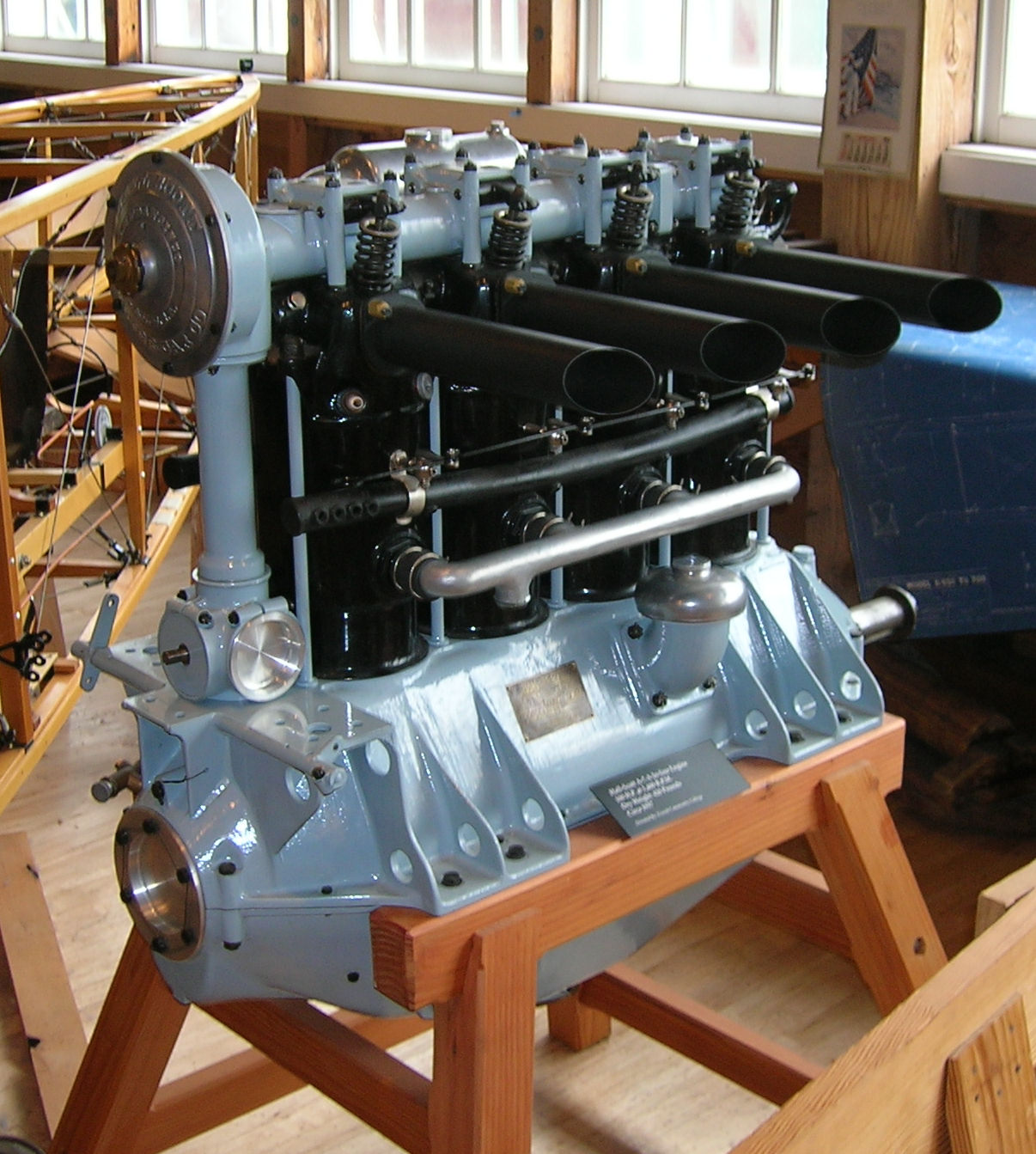
Hall-Scott A-7a at the Museum of Flight

Data from Airplane Engine Encyclopedia

=== General characteristics ===
- Type: Four-cylinder inline piston engine
- Bore: 5.25 in (133.35 mm)
- Stroke: 7 in (177.80 mm)
- Displacement: 606.14 cu in (9.93 L)
- Dry weight: 420 lb (190 kg)

=== Components ===
- Valvetrain: 1 intake and 1 exhaust valve per cylinder, SOHC
- Fuel system: Miller or Zenith carburetors
- Cooling system: Water

=== Performance ===
- Power output: 100 hp (75 kW) at 1,400 rpm

== See also ==
Related lists

- List of aircraft engines
