= Aerospace Museum of California =

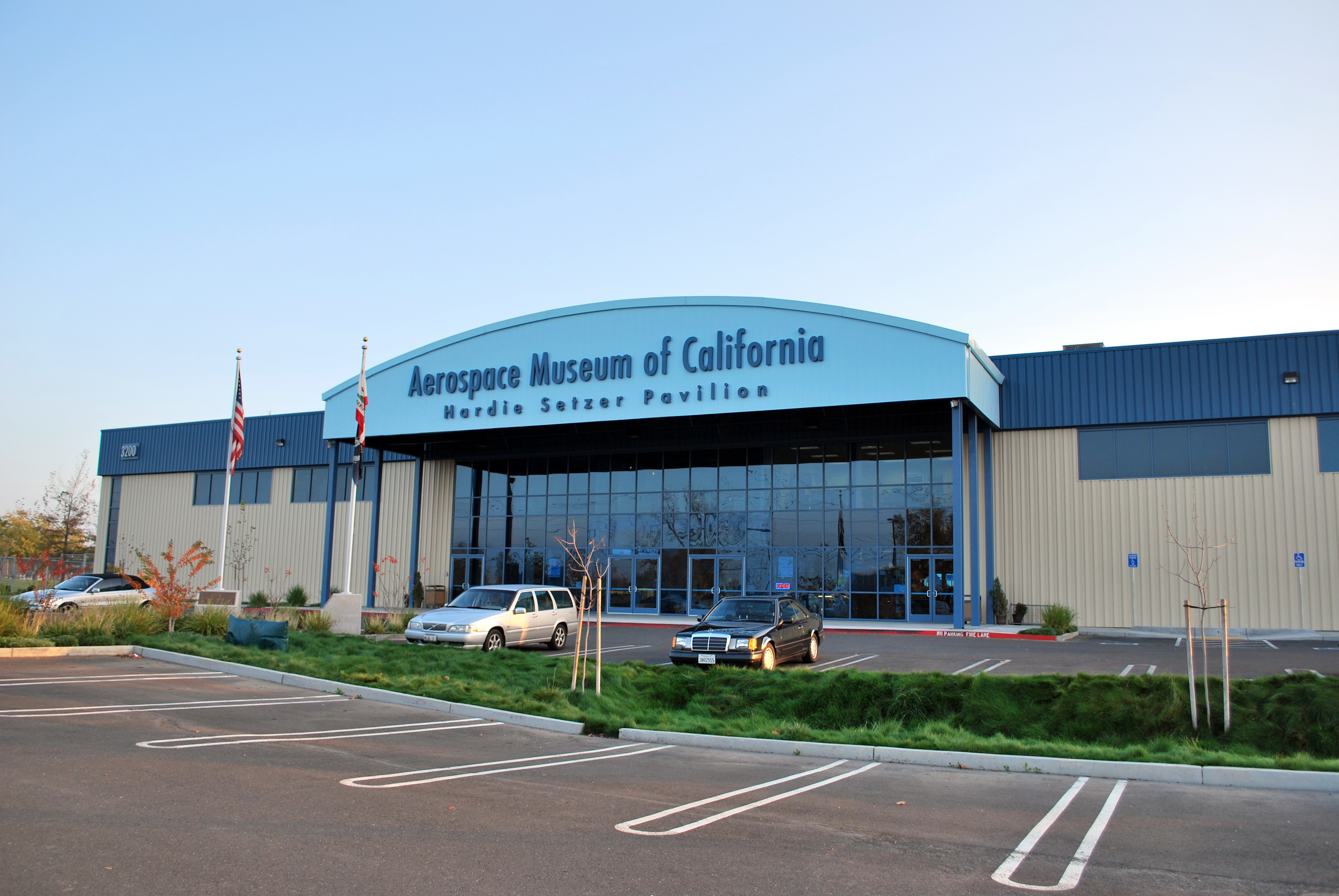
- The front entrance of the museum

- Location within California
- Former names: Air Force Logistics Museum of the West; McClellan Aviation Museum
- Established: 1982
- Location: McClellan, California, United States
- Coordinates: 38.675099°N 121.391029°W
- Type: Aviation museum
- Founder: Maj. Gen. Sidney Novaresi
- Website: aerospaceca.org

The Aerospace Museum of California is a private non-profit aviation museum located in McClellan, California, outside of Sacramento, California, on the grounds of the former McClellan Air Force Base.

== History ==
Founded as the Air Force Logistics Museum of the West in 1982, the name of the museum was quickly changed to the McClellan Aviation Museum less than a year later. It was chartered by the National Museum of the United States Air Force. The McClellan Aviation Museum housed a collection of aircraft and other objects associated with the history of aviation. The museum began refurbishing an abandoned building at the base in 1983 and in 1986 it opened to the public. In 1998, the museum was threatened with closure as part of the Base Realignment and Closure process to close McClellan Field. By the end of the base closure process in 2001, the majority of the McClellan Aviation Museum collection were transferred as indefinite loan items from the U.S. Air Force to the newly formed Aerospace Museum of California.

=== Renaming and new facility ===
In 2001, it was incorporated as a non-profit organization. Difficulties for the museum continued, as even though the aircraft had been secured, it still had to vacate the land on which it was sitting. To that end, the museum looked to purchase land in Freedom Park nearby. As work continued, the museum hired a new director, announced plans for a new facility, and changed its name to the Aerospace Museum of California in 2005. On 5 January 2007, opened its new 37,500 sq ft (3,480 m^{2}) Hardie Setzer Pavilion and 4.5 acre Air Park, enabling the museum to expand its displays to feature commercial and private aircraft, as well as aircraft used by all branches of the armed forces.

The museum opened the Old Crow Cafe in May 2021.

== Mission ==
The Aerospace Museum of California's mission is "to inspire students to explore, dream and discover STEM through hands-on learning." The museum's goal is to "give 30,000 Sacramento kids a STEM Experience— regardless of socio-economic background". The museum "hopes to inspire our future leaders to pursue a career in future STEM industries", and its vision is "to provide an interactive STEM experience to every child, school and family in the greater Sacramento region."

The museum is focused on current educational standards in science, technology, engineering, and math (S.T.E.M.) topics.

== Flight Zone ==
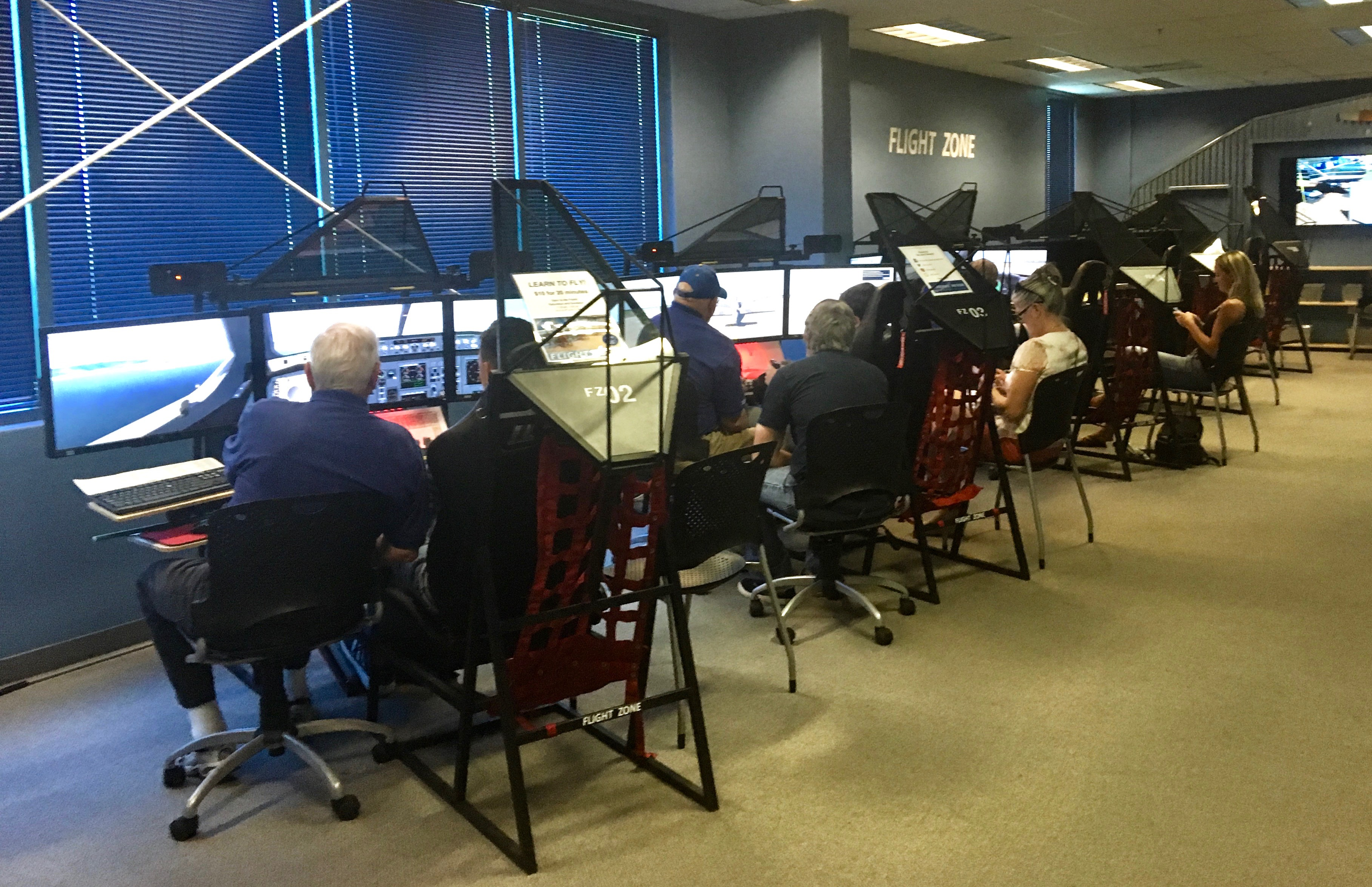
Students and instructors using the Flight Zone flight simulators at the museum.

The museum's Flight Zone houses six independent stations running the X-Plane 12 flight simulator.

Visitors can “pilot” an aircraft using a professional flight simulator under the instruction of experienced flight instructors. This allows visitors to have the opportunity to practice taking off, flying, and landing virtually. The Flight Zone program is designed for students 5th to 12th grade who are interested in learning about and exploring aviation and related fields, and is also available to the general public.

== Exhibits ==
The museum has over 40 aircraft in its collection from a fully restored Fairchild PT-19 to one of the last Grumman F-14D Tomcats retired from U.S. Navy service in 2006. In addition to aircraft, the collection includes many other historic artifacts relating to Sacramento's aerospace heritage. It also houses an extensive collection of historic aircraft engines. These include examples ranging from World War I-era Gnome and Rhone rotary piston engines, large radial piston engines, and jet engines. The latter include a I-16 (1940, Whittle design), J57 #35 (1952), and J58 turbojet, used on the SR-71 Blackbird. The museum features an art gallery containing more than 50 original works, many from the Air Force Art Collection and the United States Coast Guard Art Collection.

== Collection ==
=== Aircraft on display ===
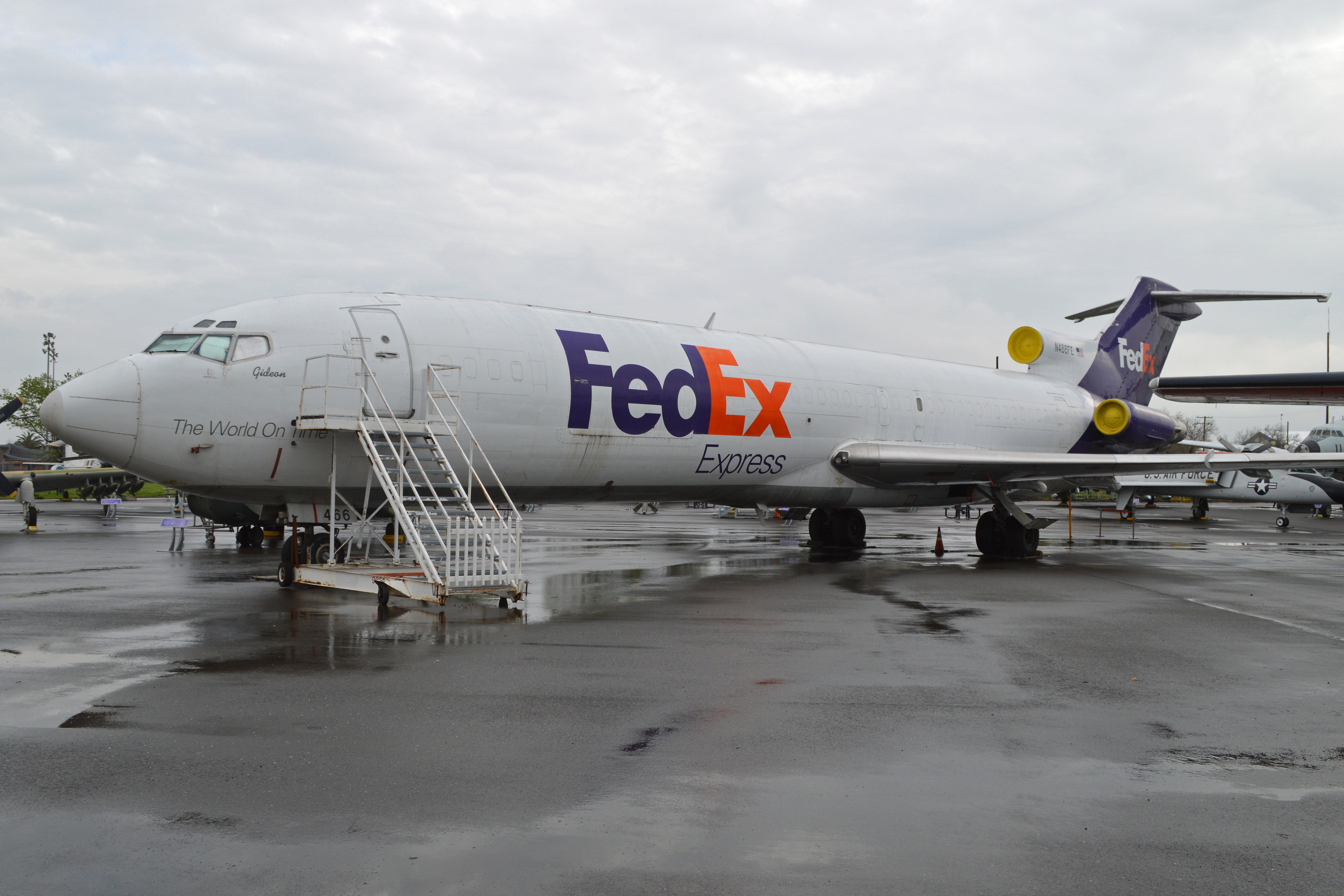
A FedEx Express Boeing 727 formerly on display at the museum

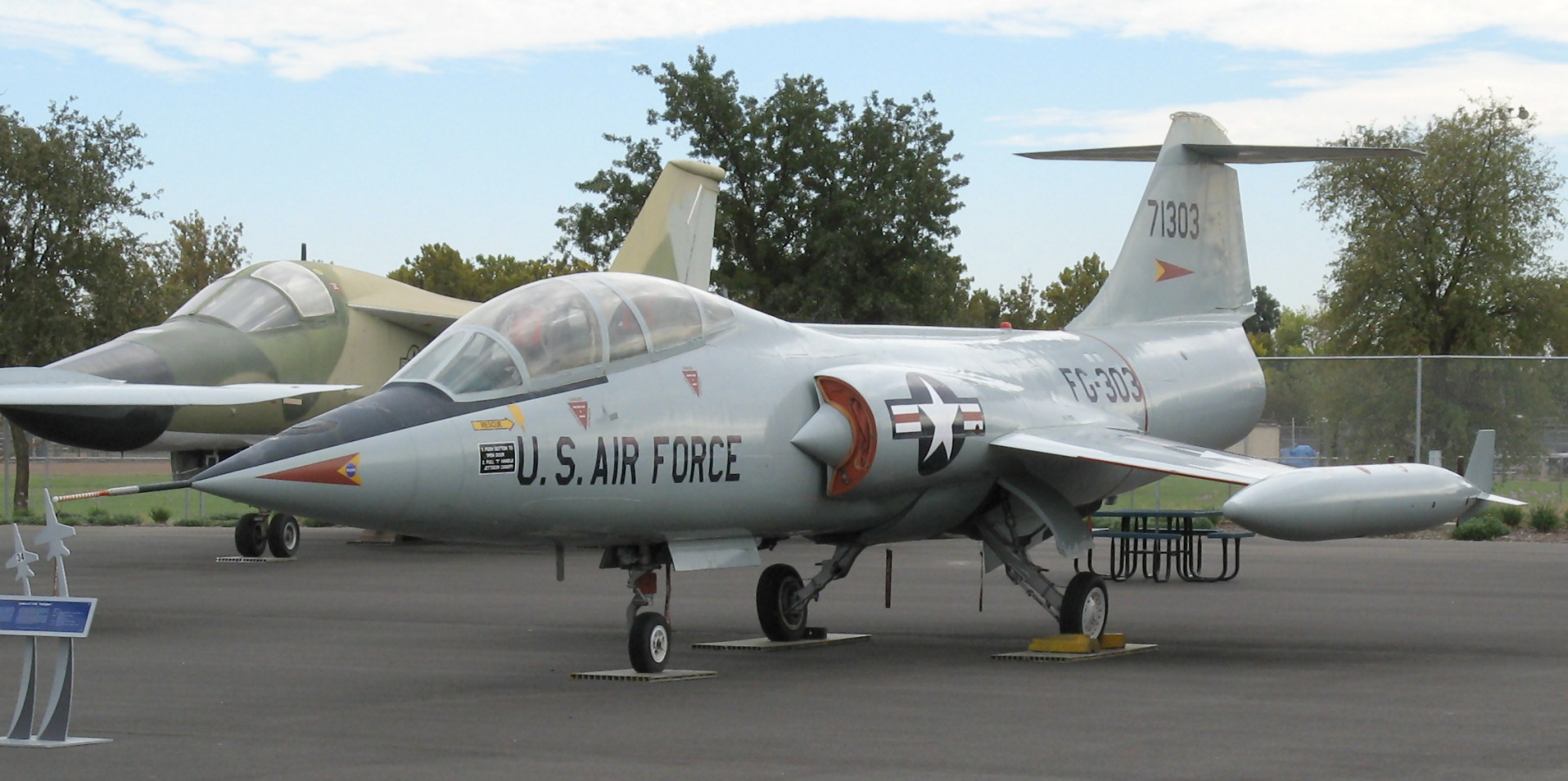
A Lockheed F-104B Starfighter on display at the museum

- Beechcraft UC-45J Expeditor
- Convair F-102A Delta Dagger
- Convair F-106A Delta Dart
- Convair VC-131D Samaritan
- Douglas A-1E Skyraider
- Douglas A-4C Skyhawk
- Douglas C-53 Skytrooper
- Douglas C-54D Skymaster
- Fairchild C-119G Flying Boxcar
- Fairchild PT-19
- Fairchild Republic A-10A Thunderbolt II
- General Dynamics FB-111A Aardvark
- Grumman F-14D Tomcat
- Grumman HU-16B Albatross
- Grumman TS-2A Tracker
- Hunting Jet Provost T.3
- Lockheed EC-121D Warning Star
- Lockheed F-80B Shooting Star
- Lockheed F-104B Starfighter
- Lockheed T-33A
- McDonnell Douglas F-4C Phantom II
- McDonnell F-101B Voodoo
- Mikoyan-Gurevich MiG-17PF
- Mikoyan-Gurevich MiG-21F
- North American F-86F Sabre
- North American F-86L Sabre
- North American F-100D Super Sabre
- North American T-6G Texan
- North American T-28B Trojan
- North American T-39A Sabreliner
- Osprey GP-3 Osprey 2
- Osprey GP-4
- Piasecki CH-21C Shawnee
- Pitts Special S-1C
- Republic F-84F Thunderstreak
- Republic F-105D Thunderchief
- Sikorsky CH-3E
- Taylorcraft L-2M
- Vought A-7D Corsair II

=== Engines on display ===
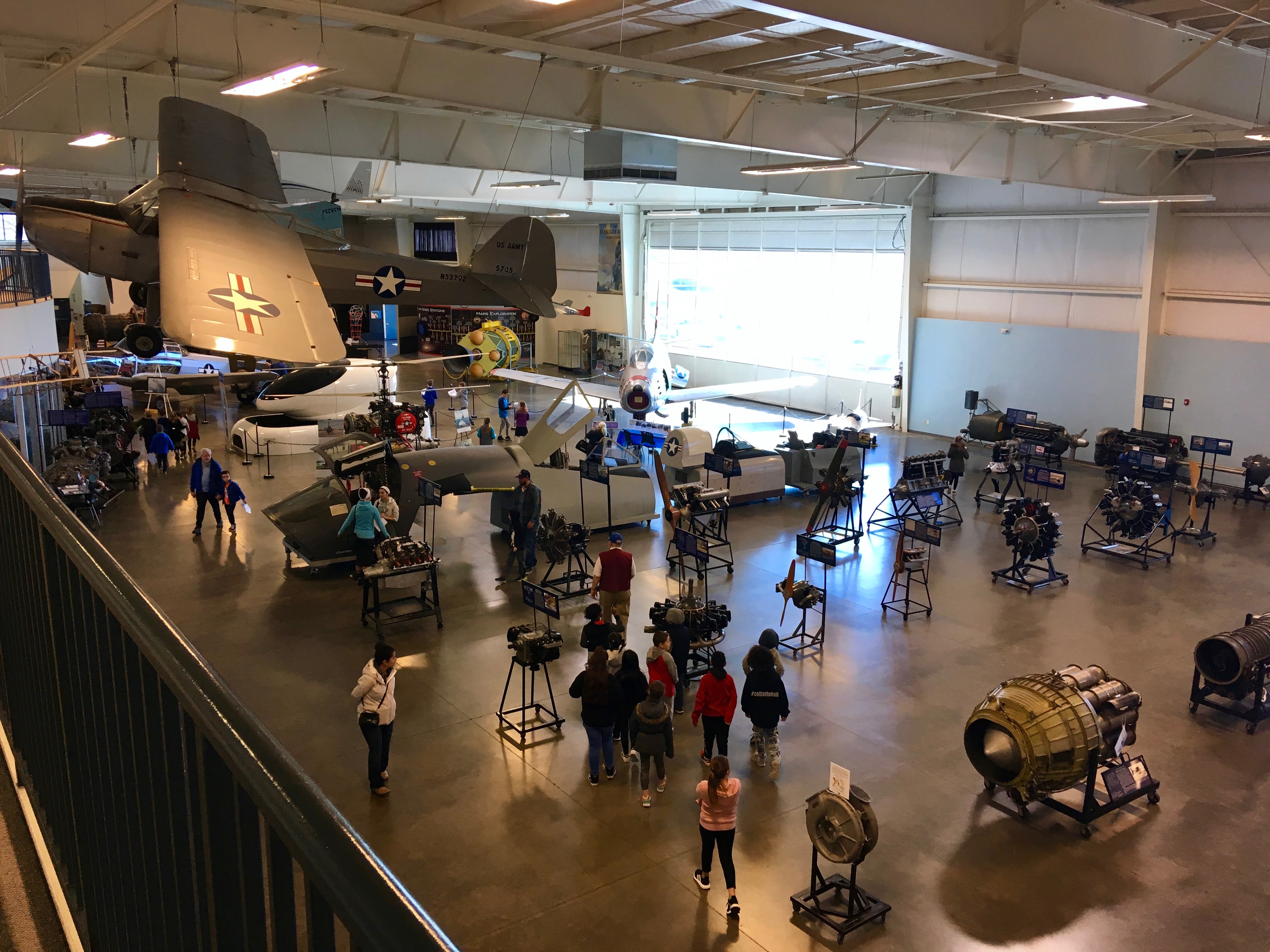
Visitors inside the exhibit hall at the museum

- Aeronca E-113
- Allison V-1710-51
- Allison V-3420
- Bristol Centaurus mk. 175
- Curtiss OX-5
- Franklin O-150 (4AC-150)
- General Electric J31
- Gnome Monosoupape 9N
- Hall-Scott A-7
- Hall-Scott A-7
- Henderson 4, motorcycle engine conversion
- Hispano-Suiza 8
- Jacobs R-755
- Lawrance A-3
- Le Rhône 9C
- Pratt & Whitney J57 (JT3C)
- Pratt & Whitney R-2800 Double Wasp
- Pratt & Whitney R-4360 Wasp Major – Complete
- Pratt & Whitney R-4360 Wasp Major – Cutaway
- Westinghouse J34
- Wright R-790 Whirlwind
- Wright R-795-11 (J-6) Whirlwind

== See also ==
- List of aerospace museums
- McClellan Air Force Base

== Gallery ==
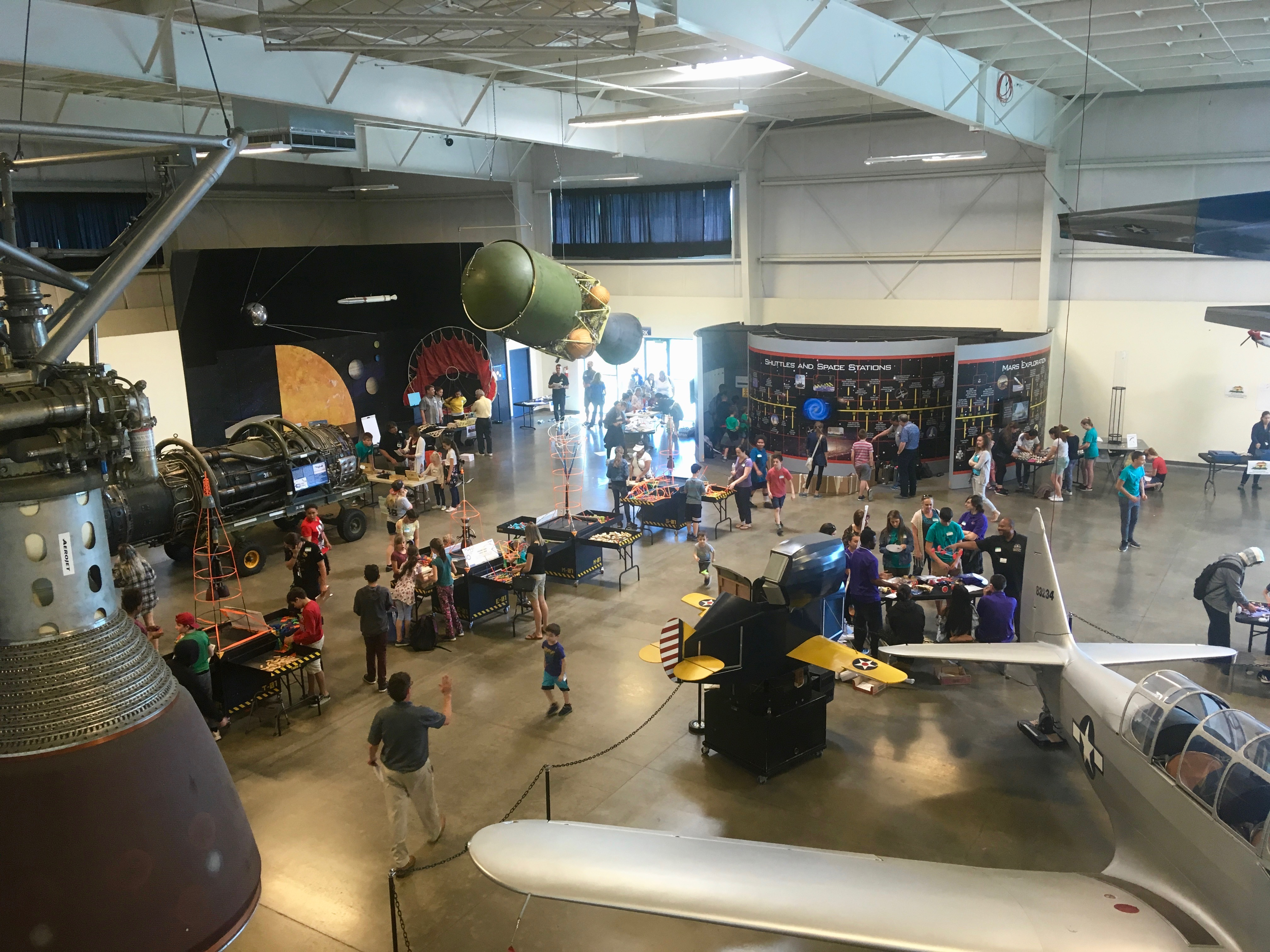

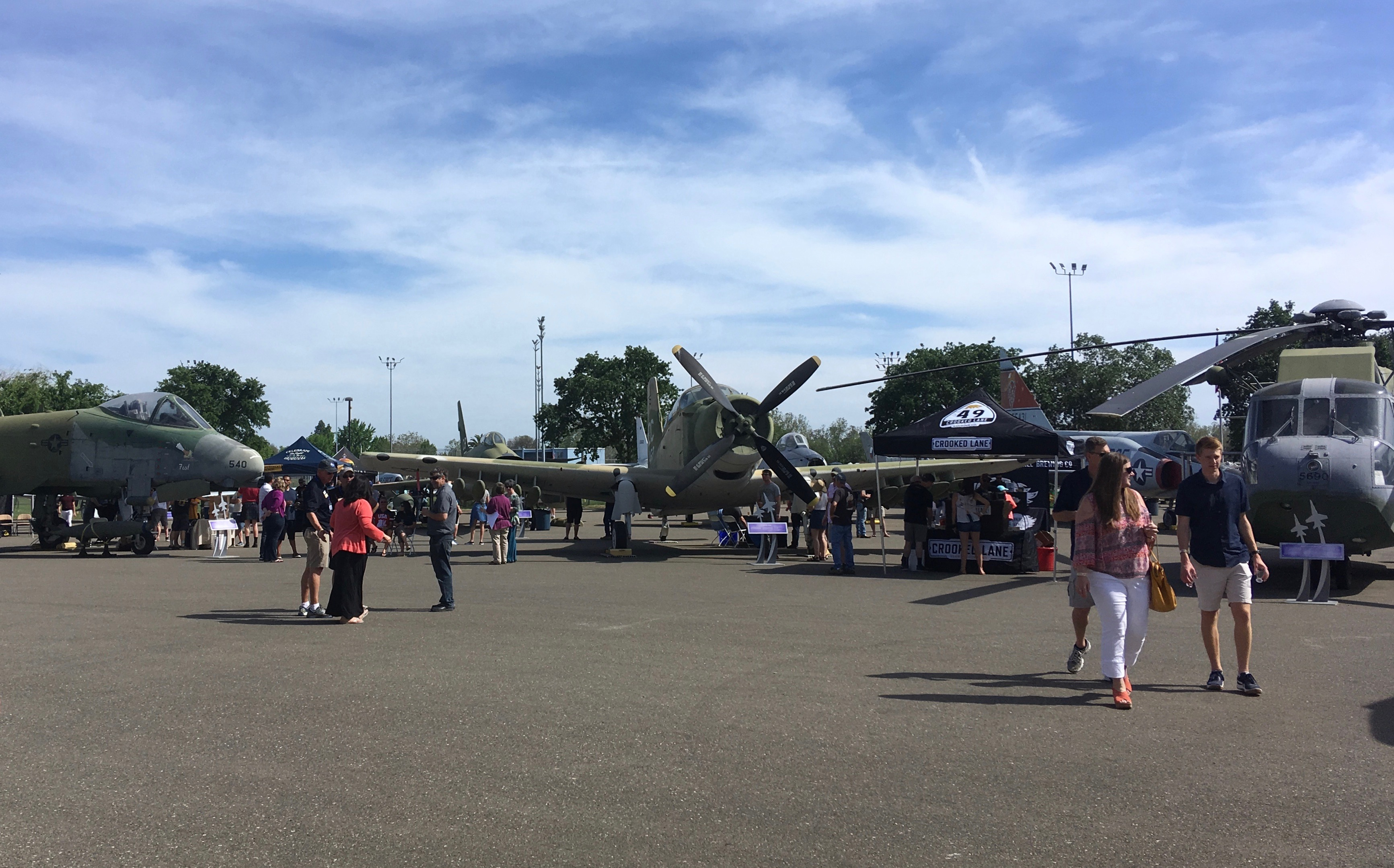

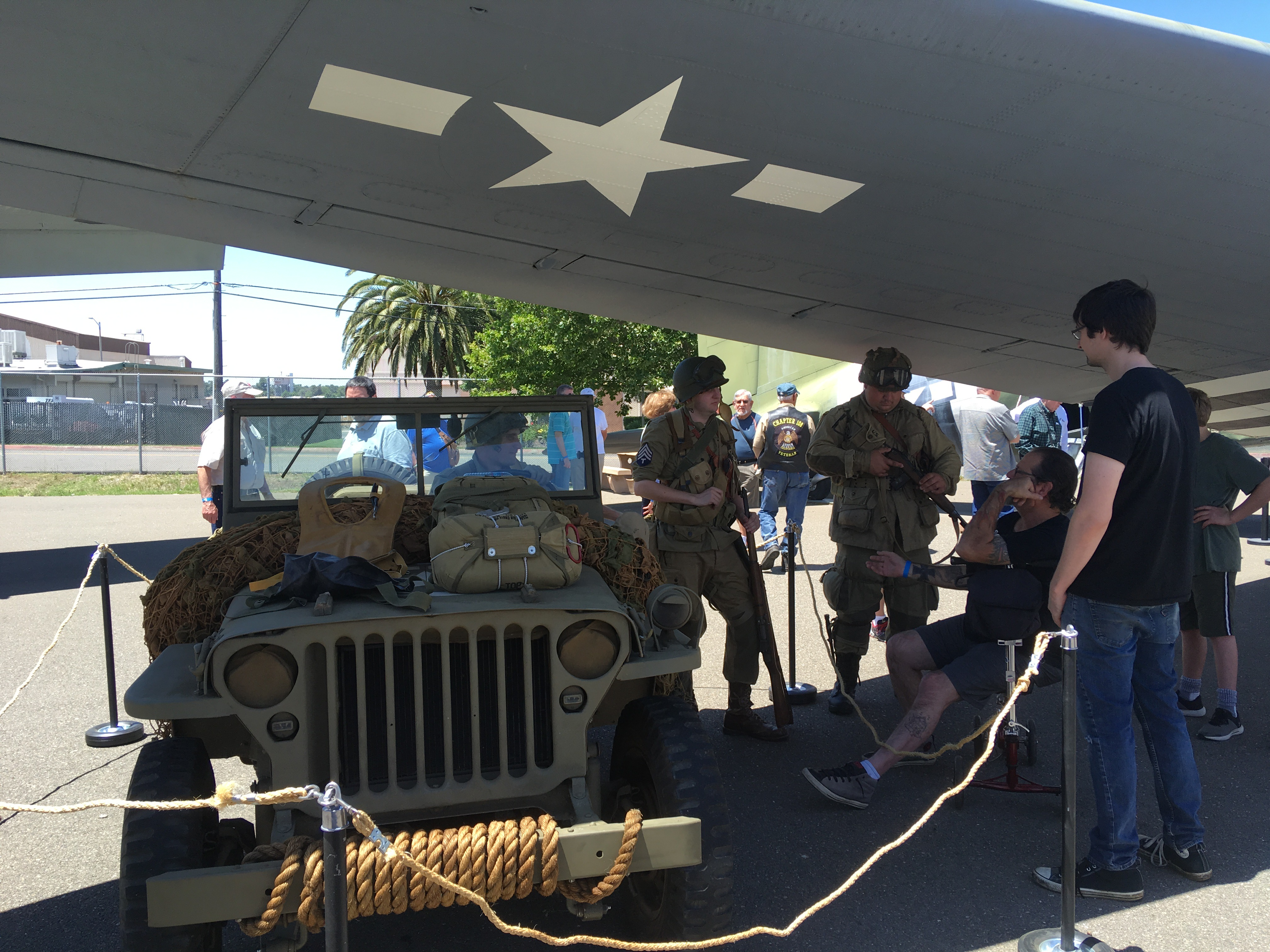

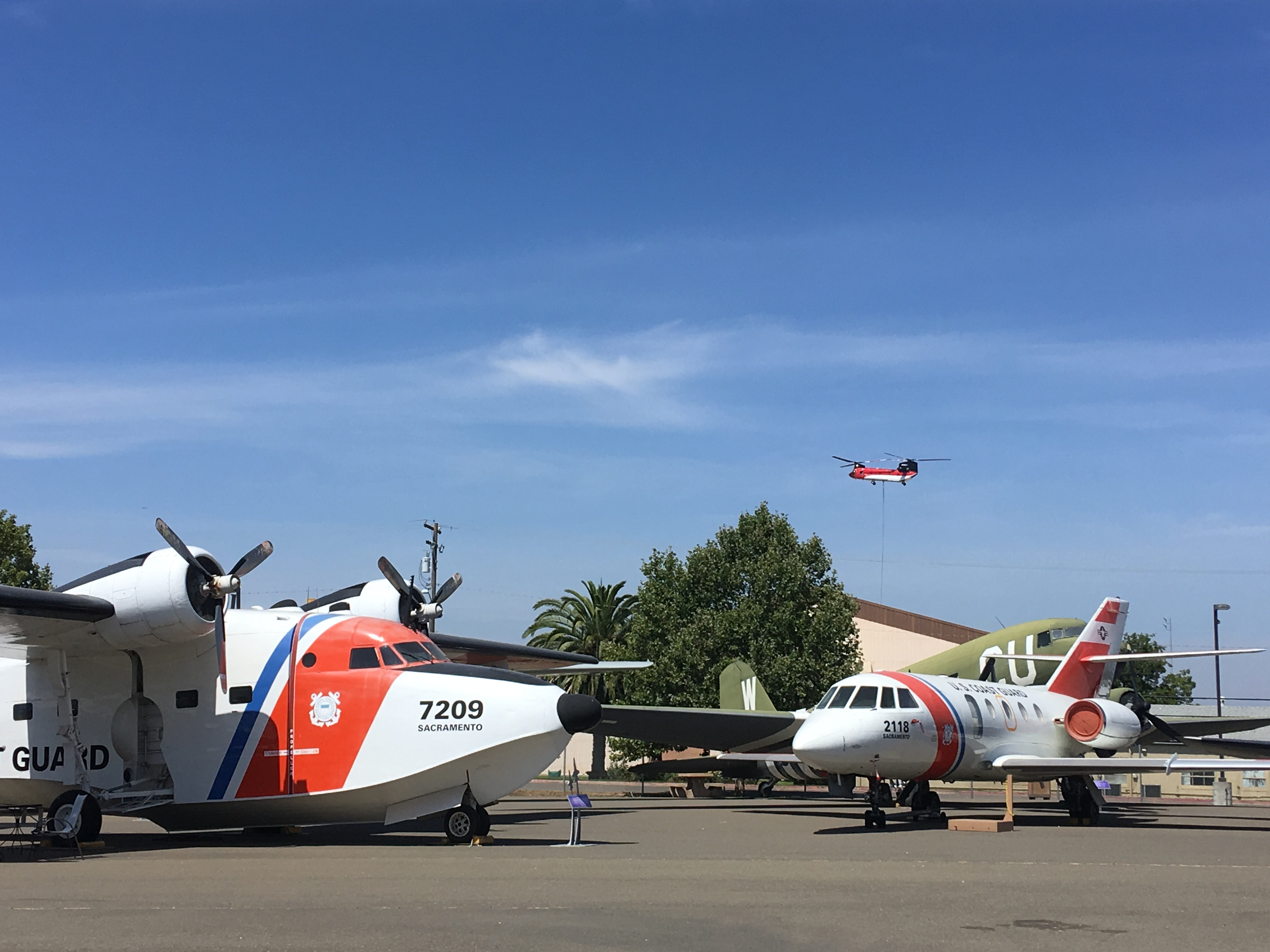

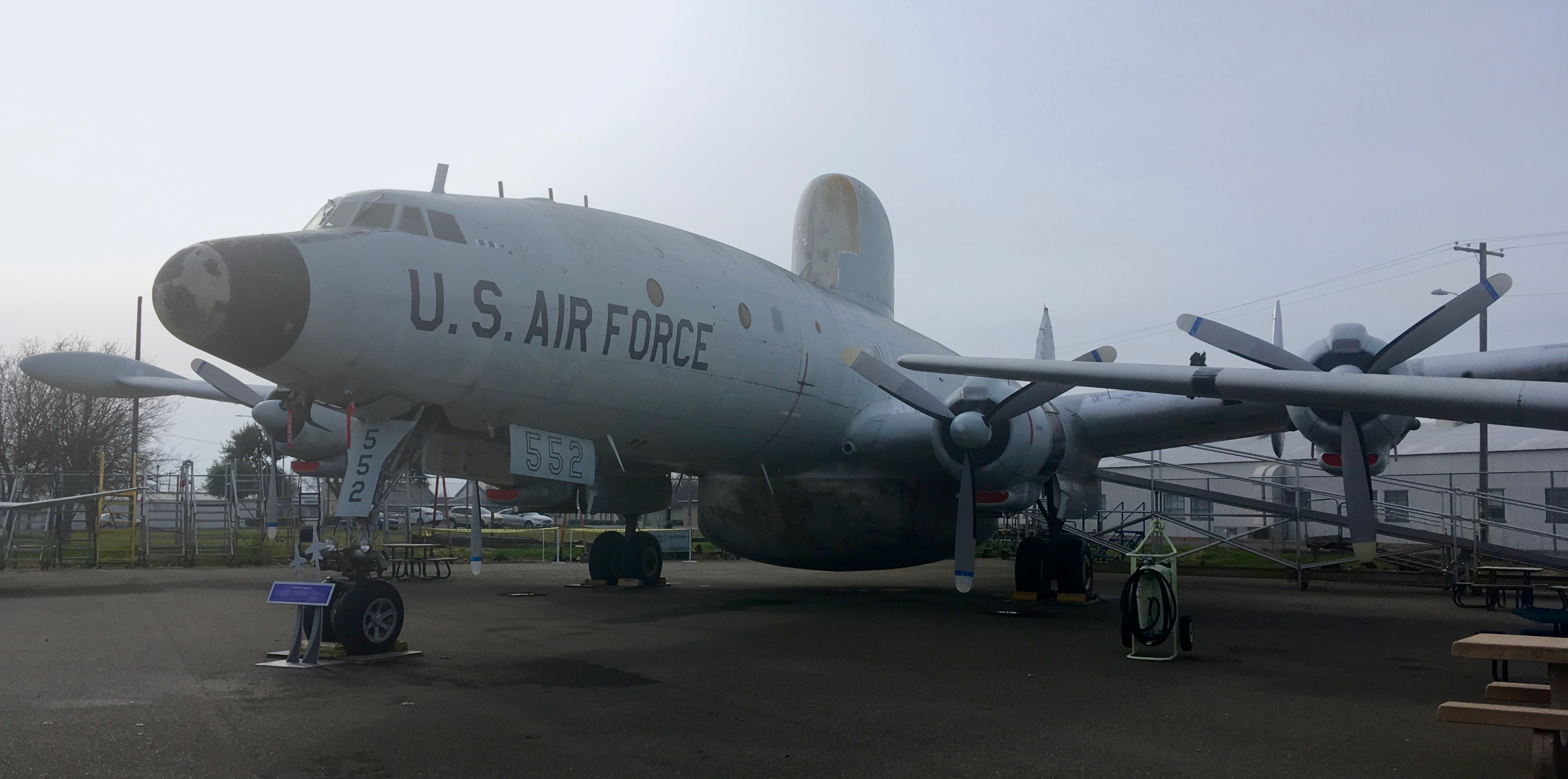

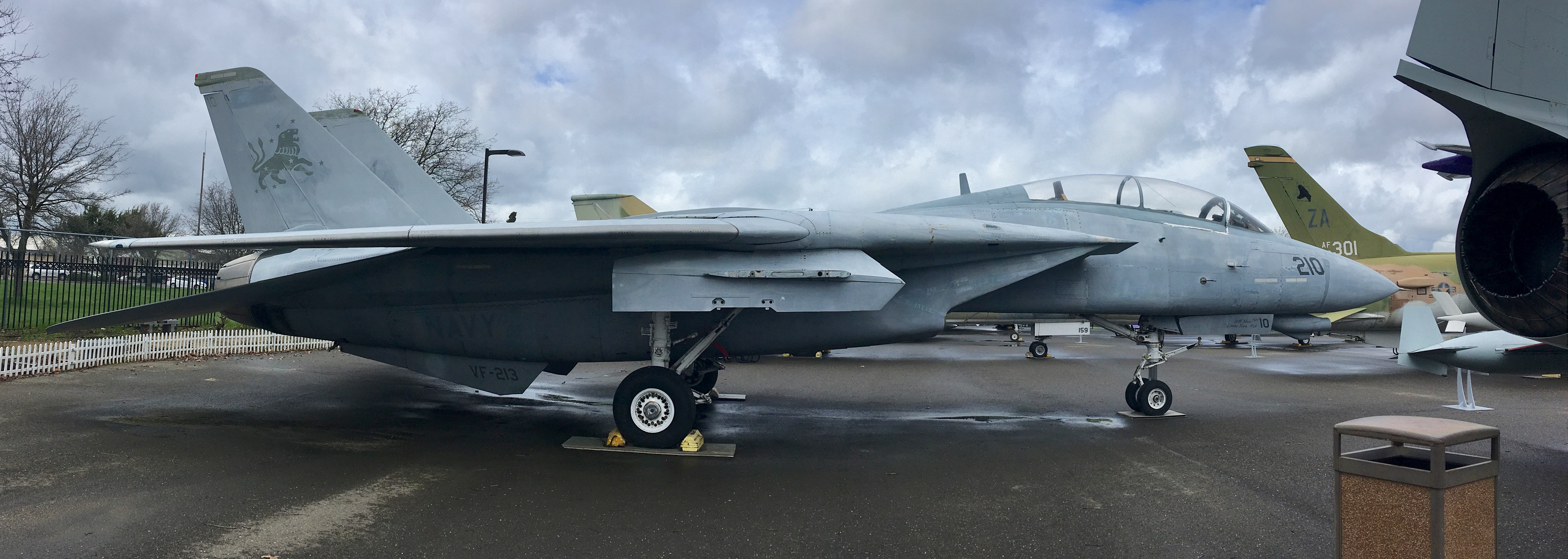

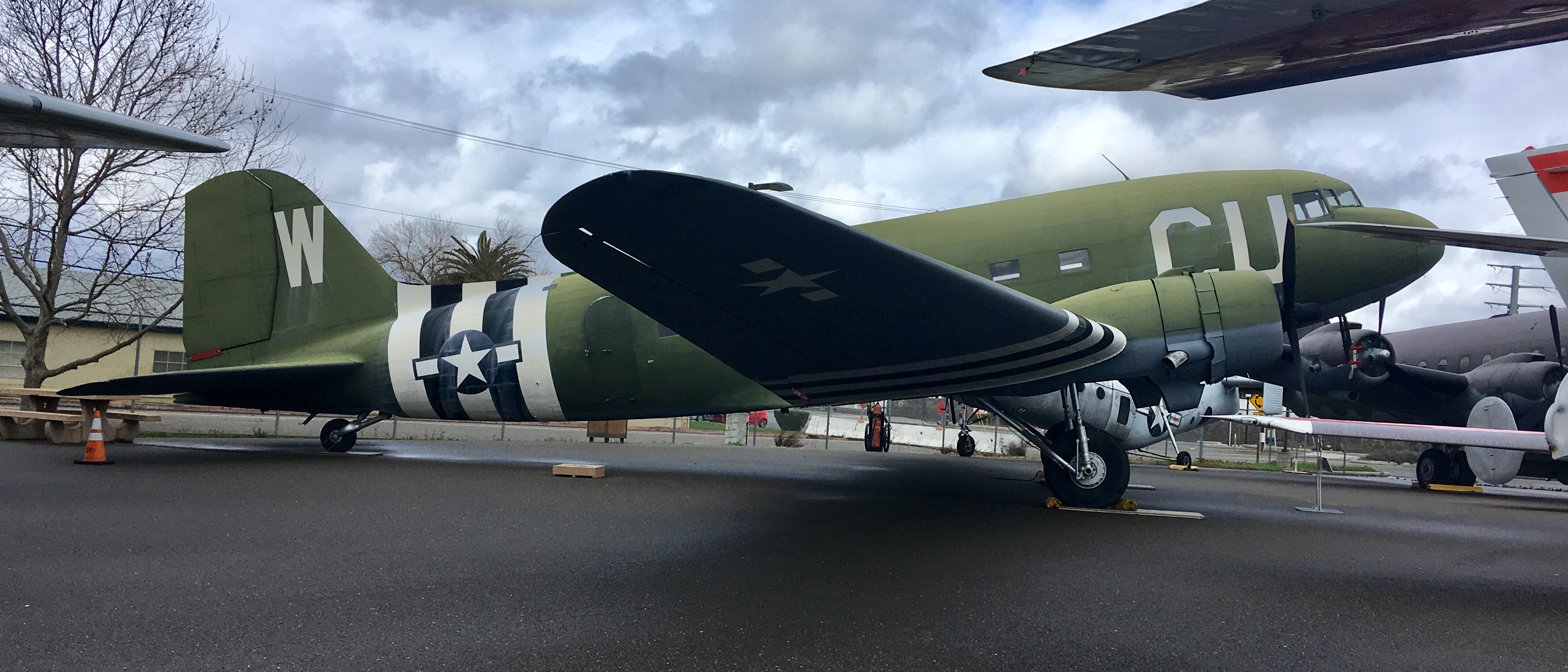

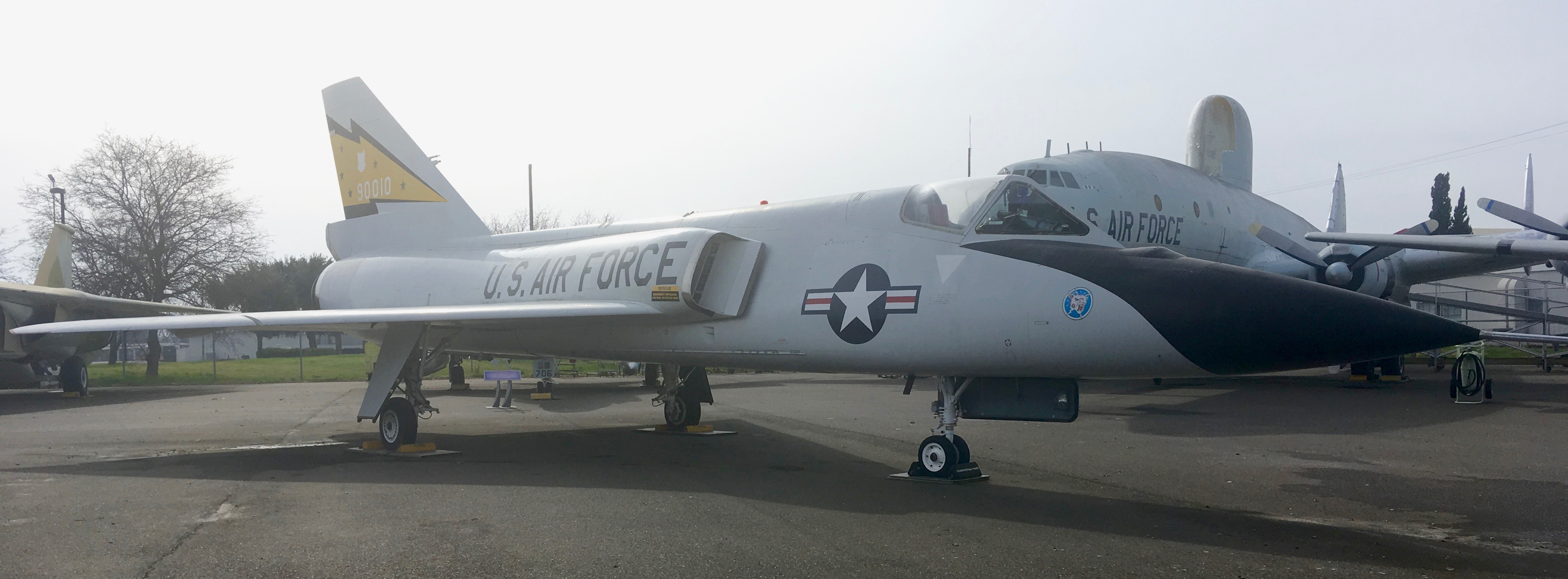

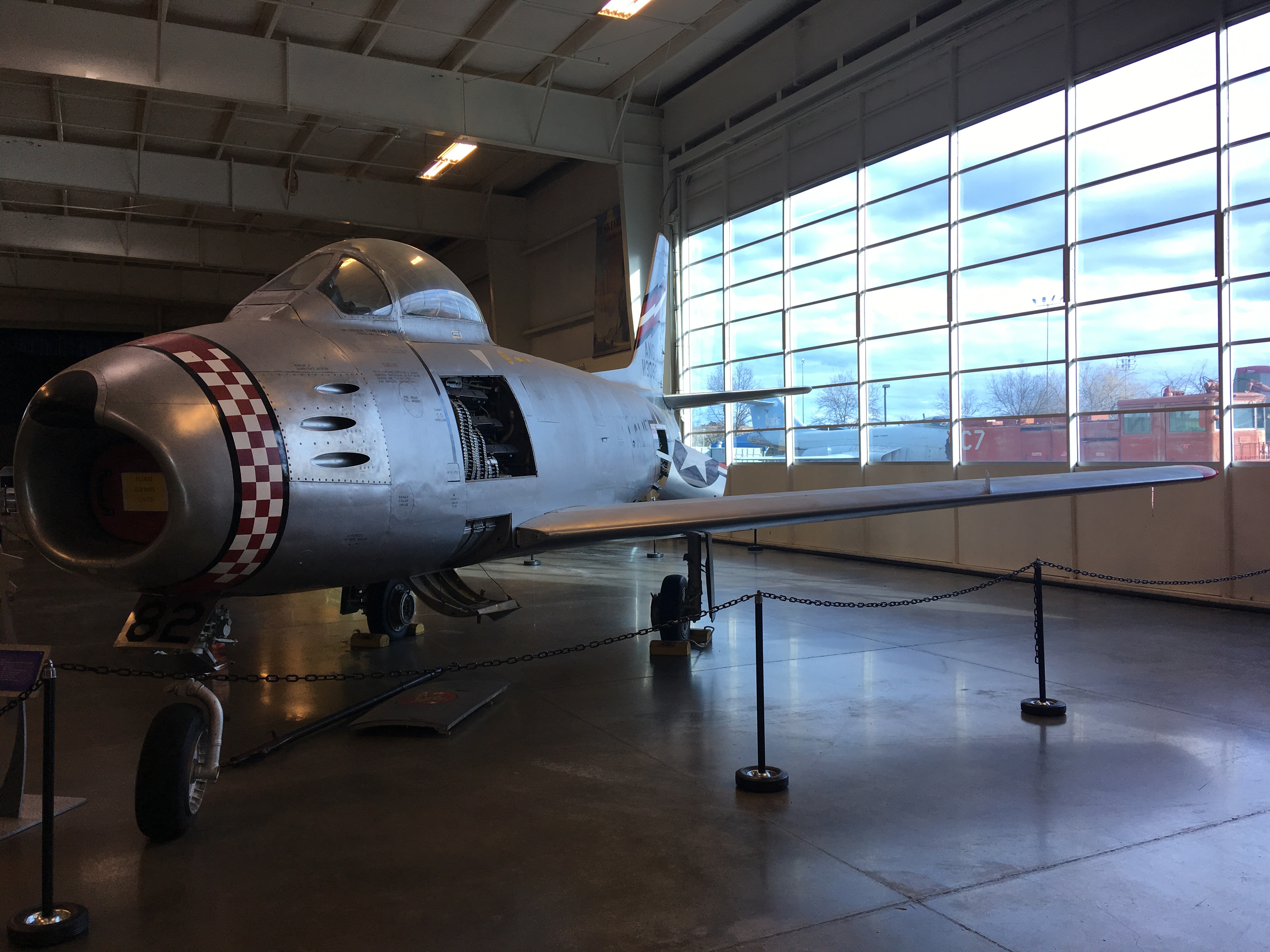

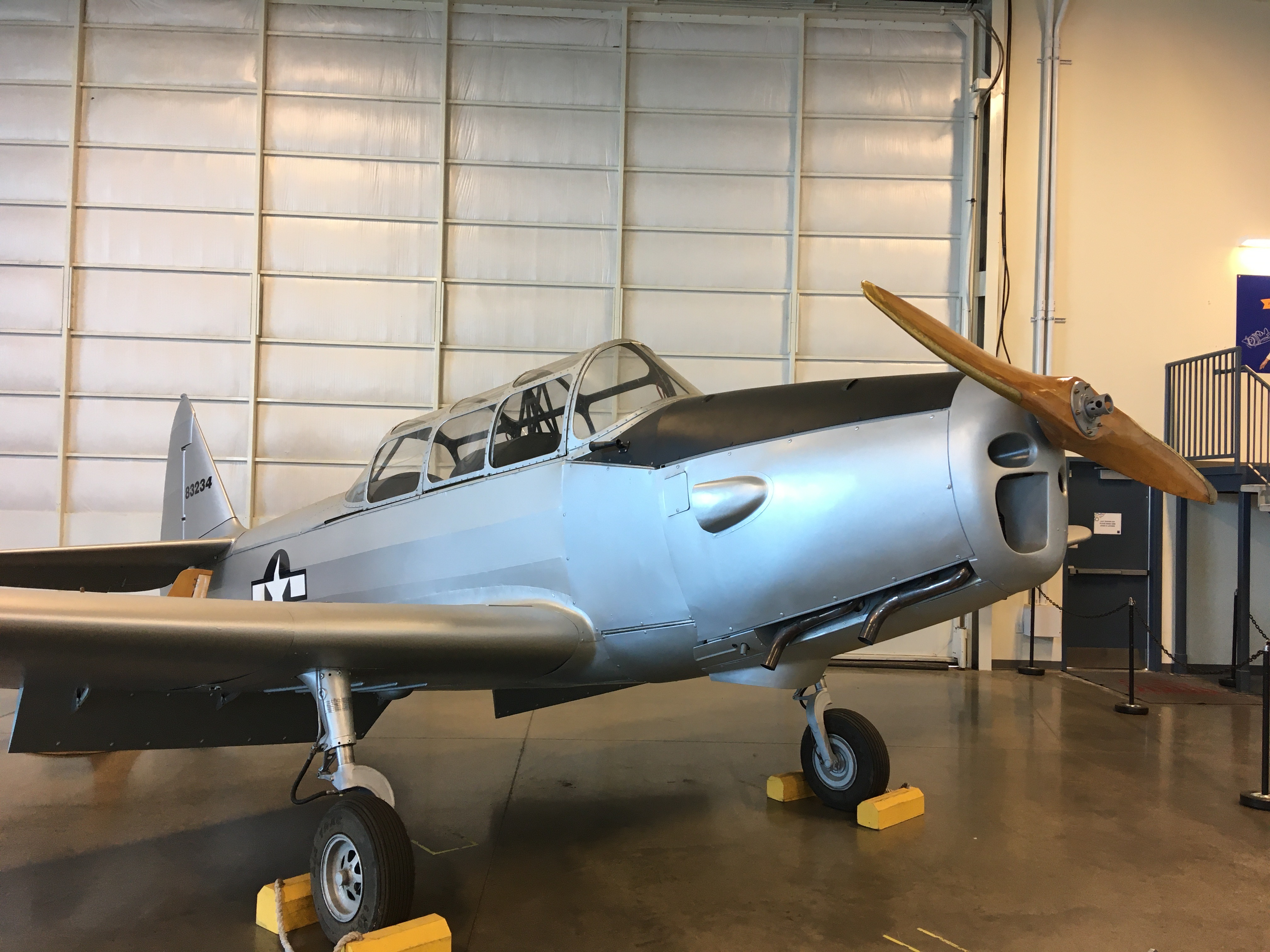

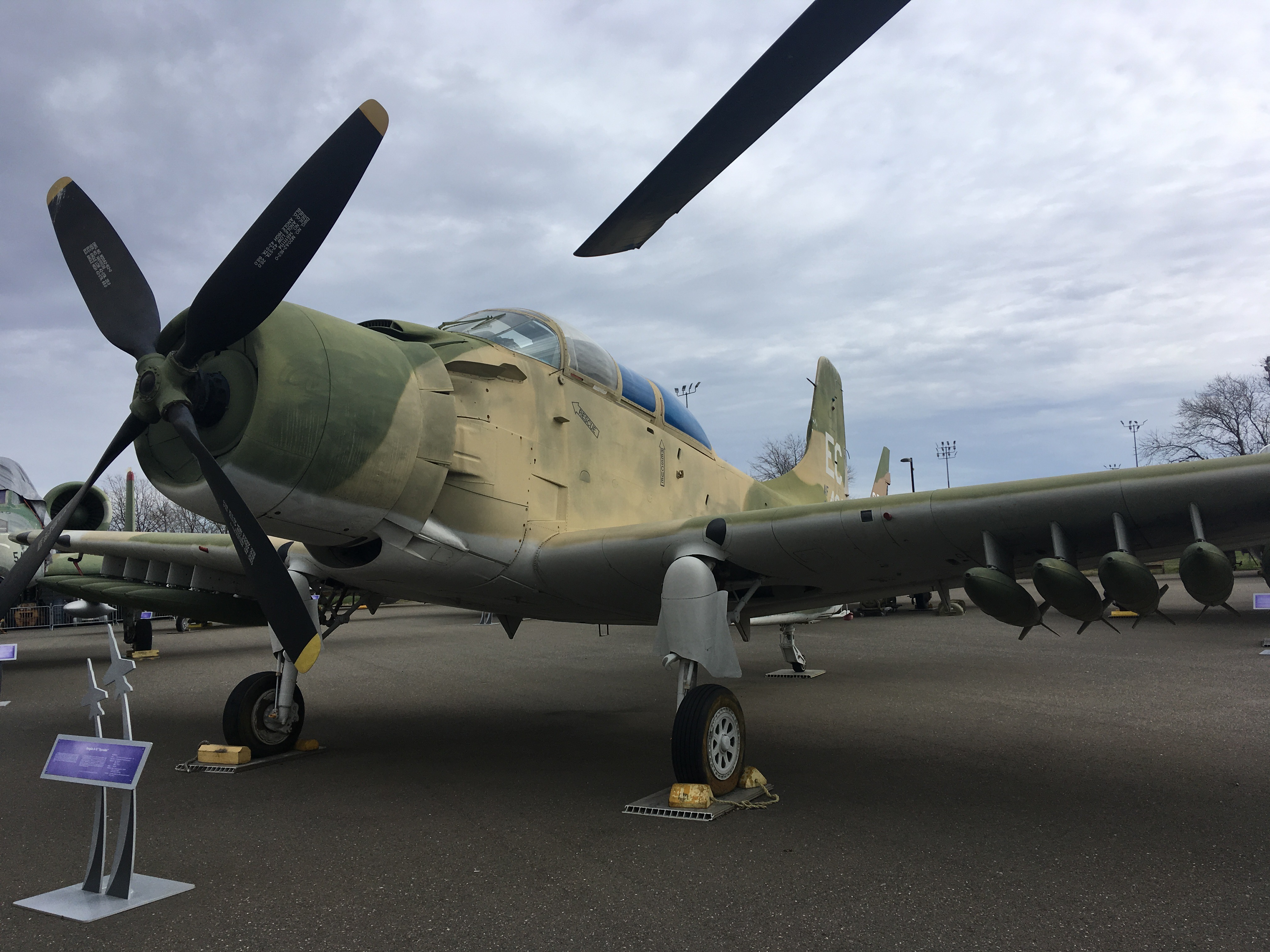

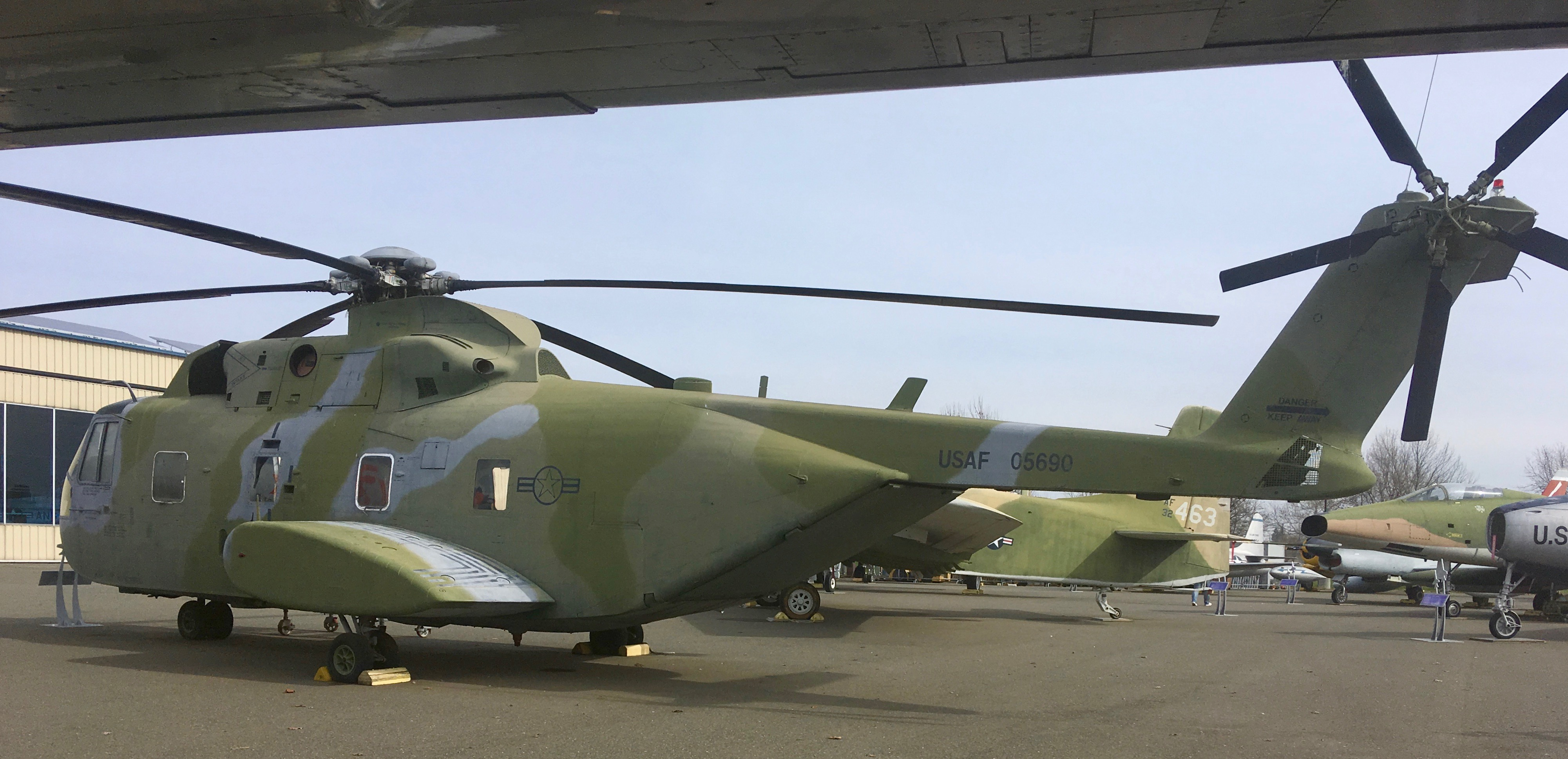

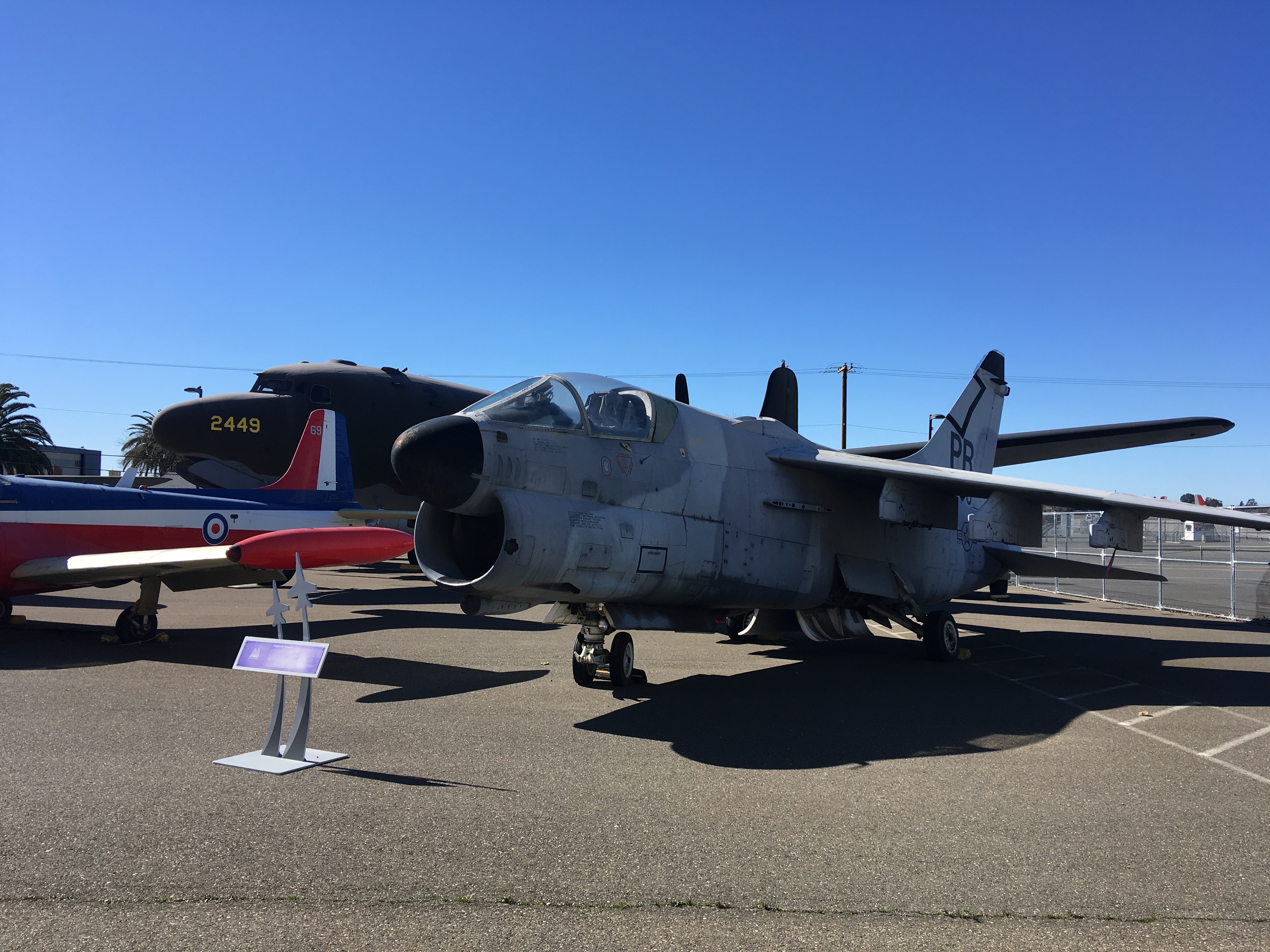
