= Dayton-Wright XPS-1 =

First aircraft with retractable landing gear

XPS-1
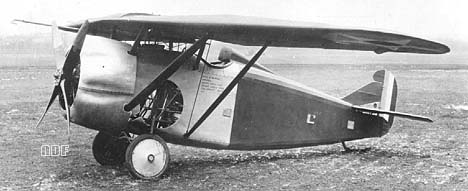
- Dayton-Wright XPS-1 during flight testing

General information
- Type: Interceptor fighter
- Manufacturer: Dayton-Wright Airplane Company
- Primary user: United States Army Air Service
- Number built: 3

History
- First flight: 1923
- Developed from: Dayton-Wright RB-1 Racer

The Dayton-Wright XPS-1 was an American single-seat fighter interceptor aircraft built by the Dayton-Wright Airplane Company.

== Design and development ==
In response to a United States Army Air Service Pursuit Alert (Special) requirement for an interceptor aircraft, Dayton-Wright Airplane Company designed an aircraft with the Army designation PS-1. Using many of the same advanced features of the earlier Dayton-Wright RB-1 Racer developed for the 1920 Gordon Bennett race. The racing aircraft had a pilot cockpit entirely enclosed in the streamlined fuselage. Construction consisted of a wooden semimonocoque fuselage with the cantilever wing constructed entirely of wood and fitted with leading- and trailing-edge flaps.

The XPS-1 differed from its predecessor in having a parasol monoplane configuration with wooden flying surfaces whose fuselage was a fabric-covered steel-tube structure. The main design feature retained from the RB Racer was its retractable undercarriage. The unusual design for the time was a tailskid undercarriage with the main units designed to retract into the lower fuselage sides. The landing gear was hand-operated using a chain-and-sprocket system. It could be raised in 10 seconds and lowered in six seconds.

Three aircraft were ordered as the XPS-1, one was used for ground tests while the remainder were slated for flight trials.

== Operational history ==
Test flights began in 1923 but the performance was so poor the United States Army Air Service refused to accept the design. The three examples remained the only type produced for the PS category.

== Operators ==
United States

- United States Army Air Service

== Specifications ==
Data from The Illustrated Encyclopedia of Aircraft (Part Work 1982-1985).

General characteristics

- Crew: One
- Length: 19 ft 2 in (5.84 m)
- Wingspan: 30 ft 0 in (9.14 m)
- Height: 7 ft 0 in (2.13 m)
- Wing area: 143 sq ft (13.38 m^{2})
- Max takeoff weight: 1,715 lb (778 kg)
- Powerplant: 1 × Lawrance J-1 radial piston, 200 hp (149 kW)

Performance

- Maximum speed: 146 mph (235 km/h, 127 kn)
