= Dayton-Wright Company =

1917-1923 aircraft manufacturer in Ohio, USA

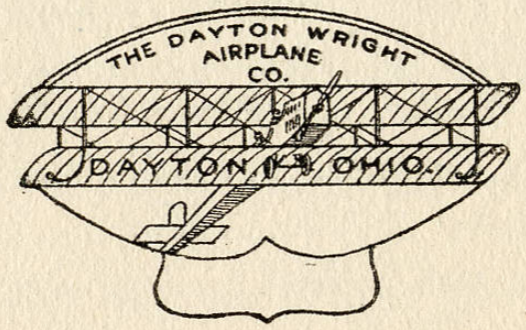
- Formerly: Dayton Airplane Company
- Industry: Aerospace
- Founded: 1917; 109 years ago
- Founders: Edward Andrew Deeds; Charles F. Kettering
- Defunct: 1923
- Fate: Rights sold to Consolidated Aircraft Corporation
- Headquarters: Dayton, Ohio, United States of America
- Parent: DELCO (1917–1919); General Motors (1919–1923)

The Dayton-Wright Company was formed in 1917, on the declaration of war between the United States and Germany, by a group of Ohio investors that included Charles F. Kettering and Edward A. Deeds of Dayton Engineering Laboratories Company (DELCO). Orville Wright lent his name and served as a consultant, but other than that, the location of one of its three factories in the original Wright Company factory buildings in Dayton, Ohio was the only connection to the Wright brothers. In addition to plant 3 (the former Wright Company buildings), Dayton-Wright operated factories in Moraine (plant 1, the main factory) and Miamisburg (plant 2), Ohio. During the course of the war, Dayton-Wright produced about 3,000 DH-4s, as well as 400 Standard SJ-1 trainers. The company was hurt by the reputation of the DH-4s it produced as "flaming coffins" or "flying coffins", although they were not in reality more subject to catching fire than other aircraft, and by scandals it faced.

== History ==
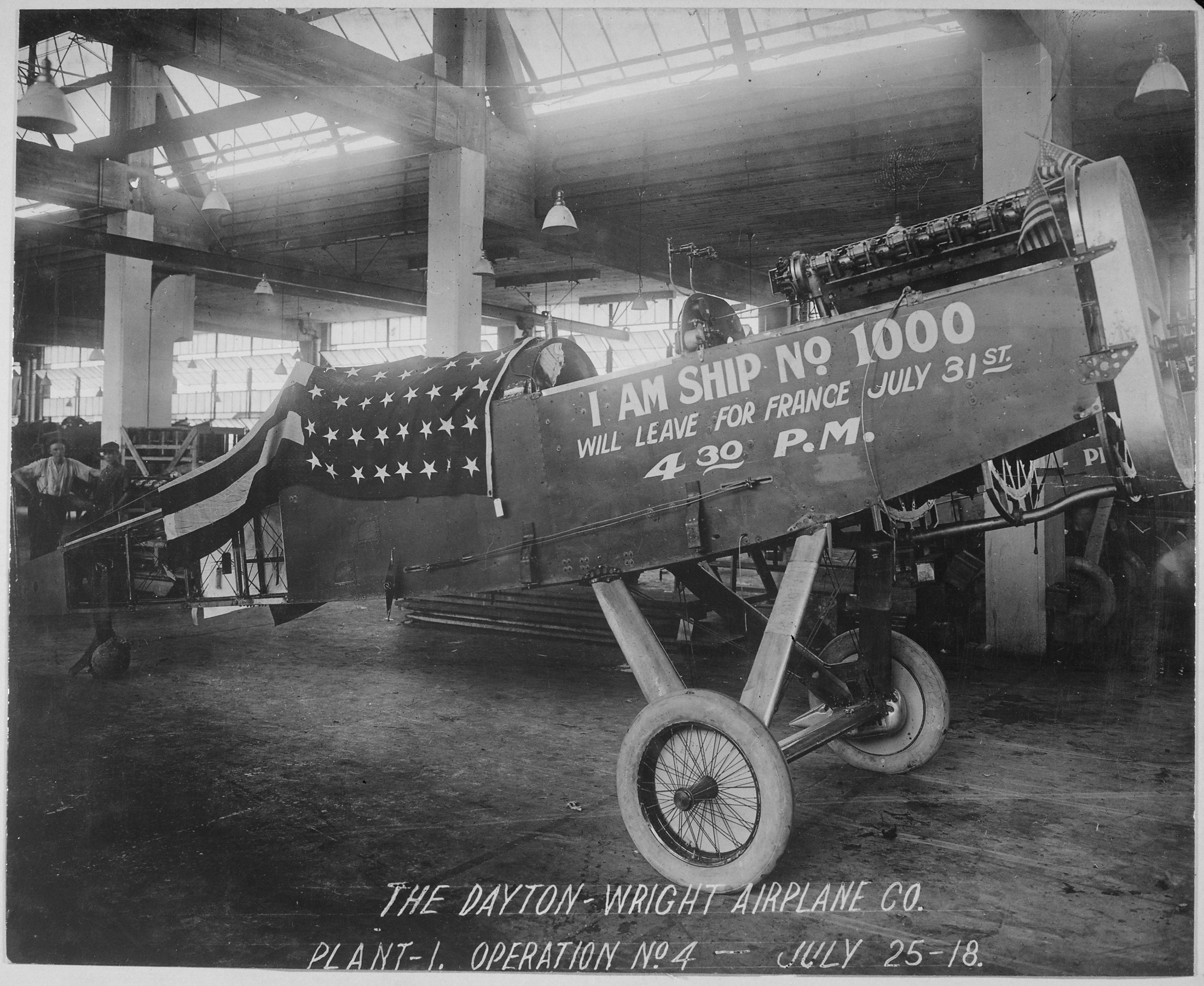
The 1,000th DH-4 built by Dayton-Wright

Deeds and Kettering had previously worked together in several ventures. Deeds' DELCO produced automobile self-starters developed by Kettering. The two used DELCO's profits to form the Dayton Metal Products Company. Then they formed the Dayton Airplane Company in 1917, which was reorganized as the Dayton-Wright Company in April. When the war began, Deeds was commissioned and put in charge of procurement for the Aircraft Production Board. He divested himself of his financial interest in Dayton-Wright but awarded the company two contracts to produce more than 4,000 DH-4 and Standard SJ-1 aircraft. Given the company's inexperience, the size of its contract led to charges of favoritism. A United States Senate committee corroborated these allegations, and U.S. President Woodrow Wilson appointed a commission headed by future Supreme Court of the United States Chief Justice Charles Evans Hughes to investigate. Although mismanagement and favoritism were documented, charges were not brought, and the company survived the scandal. It went on to produce the XPS-1, the first airplane held by the U.S. Army with retractable landing gear.

In 1919, Dayton-Wright built a limousine version of the DH-4, the single-seat Messenger, and a three-seater. In 1920, Milton C. Baumann designed the RB-1 racer, with solid balsa wood wing, enclosed cockpit, and retractable landing gear linked to rod-operated leading and trailing-edge camber-changing flaps.

In 1923 the Dayton-Wright Company had just started producing side-by-side TW-3 aircraft, powered with World War I surplus Wright E engines (American-built 180 hp Hispano-Suiza) when it was closed down by the parent company General Motors, which had purchased it in 1919. Its design rights, chief designer (Colonel Virginius E. Clark), and the TW-3 contract, were acquired by the newly formed Consolidated Aircraft Corporation of Buffalo, New York in 1923. Subsequent TW-3 aircraft were delivered as Consolidated TW-3s.

== Products ==
=== Aircraft ===
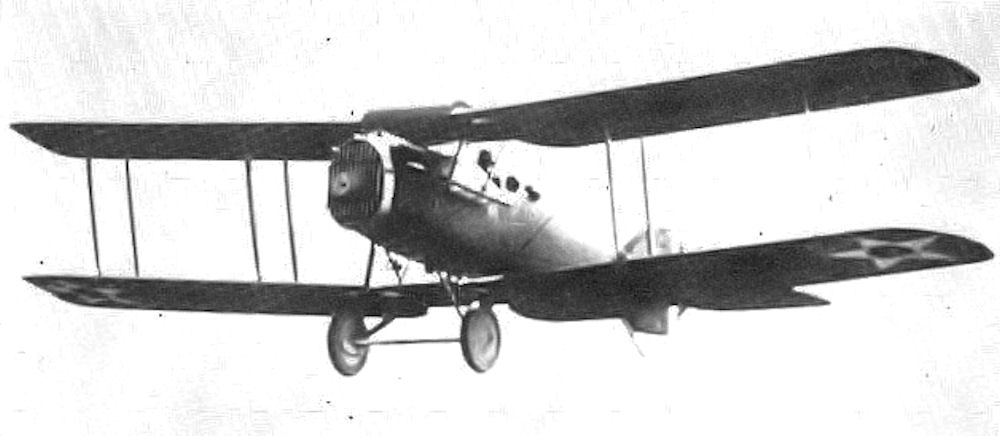
Dayton-Wright XB-1A

Model	Flight	No. built	Type
Dayton-Wright FS	1917	2	Single engine biplane trainer
Dayton-Wright DH-4	1917	3,106	Single engine biplane bomber
Dayton-Wright Messenger	1918	1	Single engine biplane reconnaissance airplane
Dayton-Wright OW.1 Aerial Coupe	1919	1	Single engine biplane touring airplane
Dayton-Wright RB-1 Racer	1920	1	Single engine monoplane racer
Dayton-Wright FP.2	1921	1	Twin engine biplane observation airplane
Dayton-Wright KT Cabin Cruiser	1921	4	Single engine biplane touring airplane
Dayton-Wright XPS-1	1923	3	Single engine monoplane interceptor fighter
Dayton-Wright XB-1A		40-44	Single engine biplane fighter

=== Missiles ===
- Kettering Bug
