= Dayton-Wright FP.2 =

FP.2
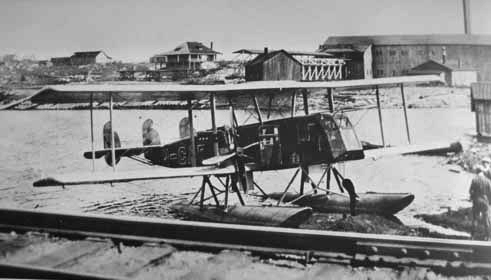
- Dayton-Wright FP.2 c. 1922, Biscoatsing, Ontario

General information
- Type: Forestry Patrol
- Manufacturer: Dayton-Wright
- Primary user: Canadian Forest Service
- Number built: 1

History
- First flight: 1921

The Dayton-Wright FP.2 was a forestry patrol aircraft developed in the United States in the early 1920s for use by the Canadian Forest Service. It was a twin-engine two-bay biplane with equal-span, unstaggered wings that were designed to be interchangeable between top and bottom. Initially designed with the props in a pusher position, the engines were remounted in tractor position before the aircraft went into service. The cabin was fully enclosed and seated four, with the single pilot in an extensively glazed nose. The empennage had triple fins, and the landing gear consisted of twin pontoons. Only a single example was built. While in service the aircraft was modified with larger side windows, and controls for a second pilot.

== Operators ==
Canada

- Canadian Forest Service

== Specifications ==
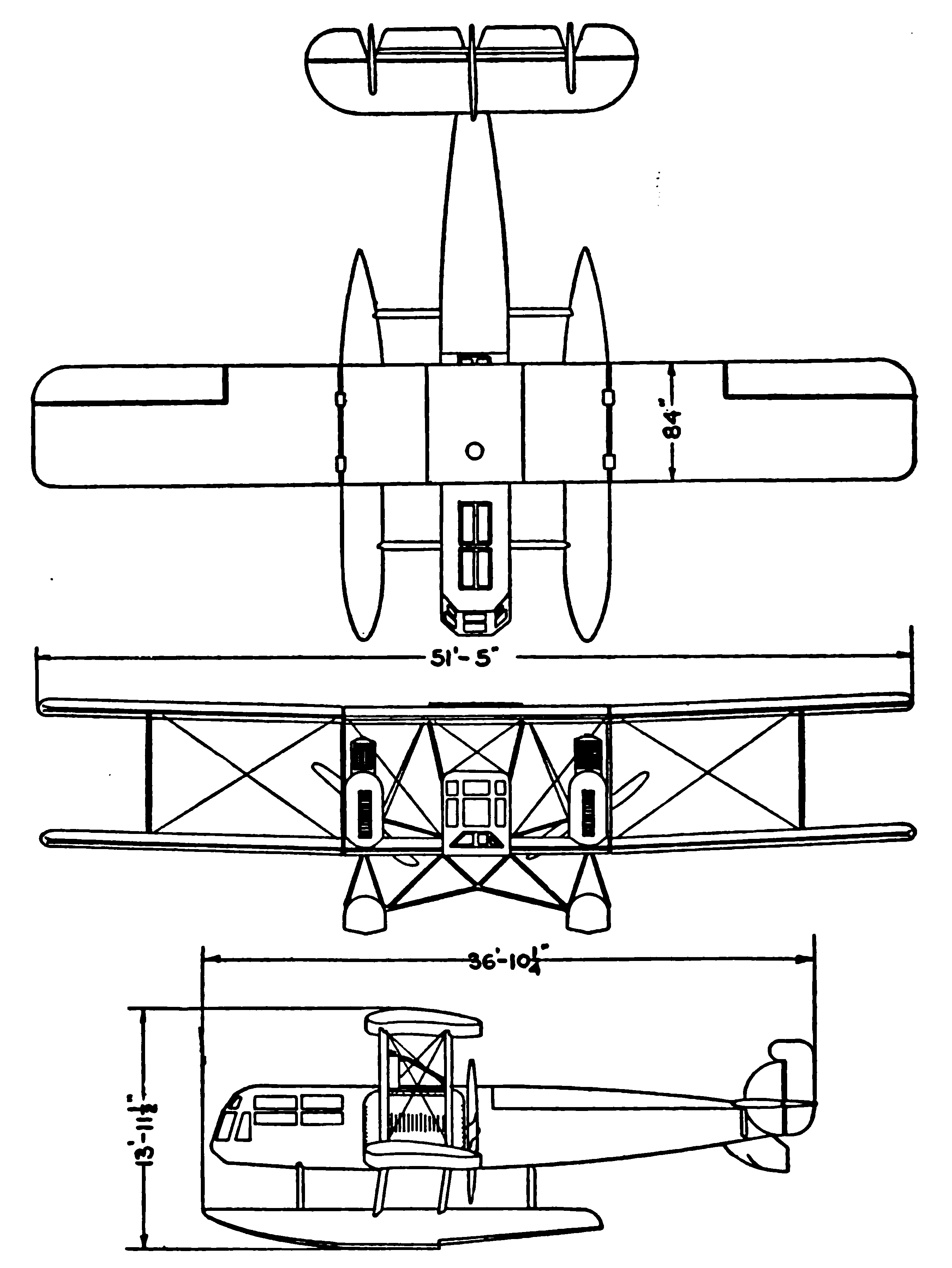
Dayton-Wright FP-2 3-view drawing

General characteristics

- Crew: One pilot
- Capacity: 3 passengers
- Length: 36 ft 10 in (11.23 m)
- Wingspan: 51 ft 5 in (15.67 m)
- Height: 13 ft 11 in (4.24 m)
- Powerplant: 2 × Hall-Scott L-6 inline engine , 400 hp (298 kW) each

Performance

- Maximum speed: 120 mph (193 km/h, 100 kn)
- Range: 325 mi (523 km, 282 nmi)
