= Zeppelin LZ 80 =

Imperial German Army airship

LZ 80 (L 35)

General information
- Type: R-class reconnaissance-bomber rigid airship
- National origin: German Empire
- Manufacturer: Luftschiffbau Zeppelin
- Designer: Ludwig Dürr
- Primary user: Imperial German Army
- Number built: 1

History
- First flight: 20 October 1916
- Retired: Decommissioned in September 1918.

The Imperial German Army Zeppelin LZ 80 (L-35) was a R-class World War I zeppelin.

== Operational history ==
The airship took part in 13 reconnaissance missions around the North and Baltic Sea; three attacks on England dropping 4,284 kg (9,445 lb) of bombs. The designers tried to make LZ 80 (L-35) more efficient by removing one engine making the airship 1,750 kilograms (3,860 lb) lighter.

== Siemens torpedo glider testing ==
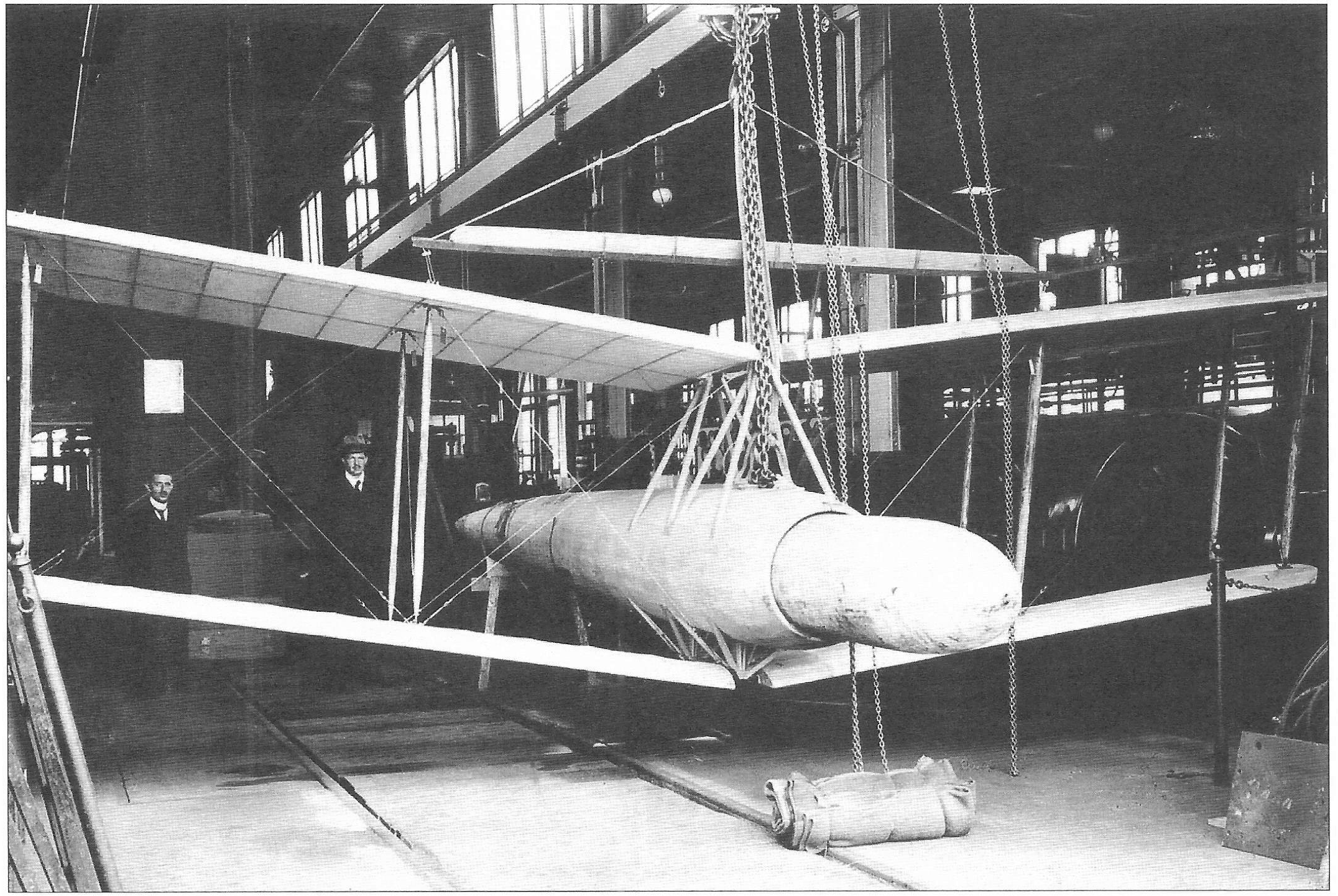
Siemens torpedo glider showing the torpedo in flight mode was dropped from Zeppelin LZ 80

The last test flight of the Siemens torpedo glider was performed on August 2, 1918. On this flight a 1,000 kilograms (2,200 lb) biplane glider was launched from Zeppelin LZ 80 (L 35). The glider was released from 1,500 metres (4,900 ft) over the Havel river and worked as expected until its control wire that attached the glider to the Zeppelin snapped and the glider spun out of control.

== Specifications (LZ 80 / Type R zeppelin) ==
Data from Zeppelin : rigid airships, 1893–1940

General characteristics

- Crew: 17-19
- Capacity: 32,400 kg (71,430 lb) typical disposable load
- Length: 198 m (649 ft 7 in)
- Diameter: 23.9 m (78 ft 5 in) maximum
- Fineness ratio: 8.24
- Volume: 55,200 m^{3} (1,950,000 cu ft) in 19 gas cells
- Empty weight: 31,400 kg (69,225 lb)
- Gross weight: 32,908 kg (72,550 lb)
- Fuel capacity: 6,250 kg (13,779 lb)
- Useful lift: 63,800 kg (140,700 lb)
- Powerplant: 5 × Maybach HS Lu 6-cylinder water-cooled in-line piston engines, 180 kW (240 hp) each
- Propellers: 4-bladed Lorenzen fixed-pitch propellers

Performance

- Maximum speed: 103 km/h (64 mph, 56 kn)
- Cruise speed: 81 km/h (50 mph, 44 kn)
- Range: 7,400 km (4,600 mi, 4,000 nmi) at 81 km/h (50 mph; 44 kn)
- Service ceiling: 3,900 m (12,800 ft) static
- Rate of climb: 10 m/s (2,000 ft/min) maximum permitted (r-class)

Armament

- Guns: machine-guns in hull-top positions and gondolas
- Bombs: up to 60 bombs to a total of 5,000 kg (11,023 lb)

== See also ==
- List of Zeppelins

== Bibliography ==
Notes

'References

- Brooks, Peter W. (1992). Zeppelin : rigid airships, 1893–1940. Washington, D.C.: Smithsonian Institution Press. pp. 95–99. ISBN 9781560982289.
- Friedman, Norman (2011). Naval Weapons of World War One: Guns, Torpedoes, Mines and ASW Weapons of All Nations. Pen and Sword. ISBN 9781473816664. - Total pages: 320
- Reuter, Claus (2020). The V2 and the German, Russian and American Rocket Program. German Canadian Museum. ISBN 9781894643054.
- Stephenson, Charles & Illustrator Ian Palmer (2012). Zeppelins: German Airships 1900–40. Bloomsbury Publishing. ISBN 9781780965123. - Total pages: 48
