= Dayton-Wright RB-1 Racer =

RB-1 Racer
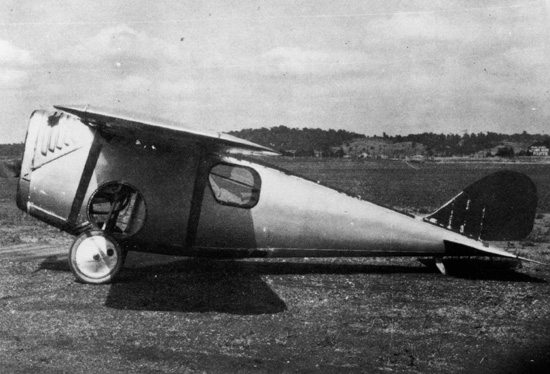

General information
- Type: Racing aircraft
- Manufacturer: Dayton-Wright
- Designer: Howard Max Rinehart, Milton C. Baumann, Charles Hampson Grant
- Number built: 1

History
- First flight: 1920
- Variant: Dayton-Wright XPS-1

The Dayton-Wright RB-1 (Rinehart (Note: Howard Max Rinehart, flight instructor and later, aeronautical engineer.) Baumann (Note: Milton C. Baumann, a US Army officer who was an aeronautical engineer during WW1.) model one), also known simply as the Dayton-Wright Racer was a high wing single-engine monoplane racing aircraft developed in the United States to participate in the 1920 Gordon Bennett Cup air race.

== Design and development ==
The RB-1 was a high-wing monoplane with a monocoque fuselage and cantilever wing built around a solid balsa wood core laminated with plywood and covered in linen that incorporated a mechanism designed by Charles Hampson Grant to vary its camber in flight by adjusting the angles of the leading and trailing edges, with the trailing edge being a plain flap, and the leading edge functioning similarly. The aircraft also featured a retractable undercarriage operated by a hand-crank making it one of the first instances of undercarriage retraction for aerodynamic benefit alone. The design incorporated one particularly unique design element - the variable wing camber was mechanically linked to the landing gear, and the two worked in unison. This meant that the wing’s configuration adapted to high-speed flight when the gear was retracted and to lower-speed flight when the gear was extended.

The propeller shaft was mounted through a large oval radiator. The pilot had no forward view, but was provided with flexible celluloid side windows. Cockpit access was through a hatch in the top of the fuselage. A prototype was built using non-retractable gear and strut-braced wings. A shorter tapered "racing wing" was installed afterward with leading and trailing edge flaps interconnected with landing gear deployment. The mechanisms and hinges for the wing flaps were exposed across the top of the solid wing. The racing wing produced directional instability requiring small tail fins to be added.

== Operational history ==
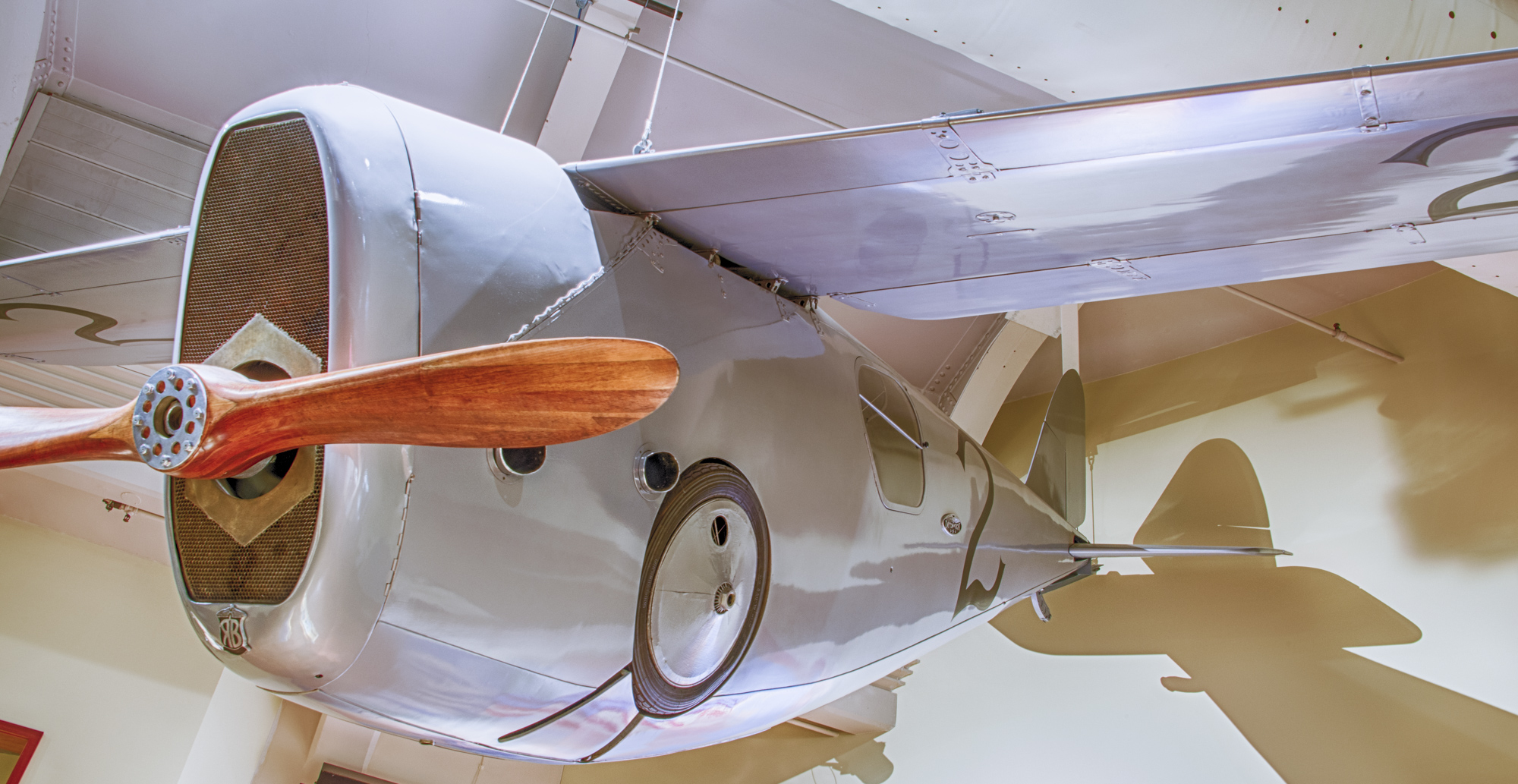
The Dayton-Wright Racer at the Henry Ford Museum.

Dismantled and shipped to France, the RB-1 was flown by Howard Rinehart in the 28 September 1920 race, but was forced to withdraw after a cable failure prevented retraction of the gear/flap mechanism, allowing the two Nieuport-Delage NiD.29V racers to make a one-two finish. After the race it was returned to the United States, and is now preserved at the Henry Ford Museum in Dearborn, Michigan. Many of the aircraft's advanced features were incorporated into a prototype fighter, the XPS-1.

== Variants ==
- Dayton-Wright XPS-1 - A 1921 Pursuit aircraft using the RB landing gear design.

== Specifications ==
Data from 1921 Aircraft Yearbook

General characteristics

- Crew: One pilot
- Length: 22 ft 8 in (6.91 m)
- Wingspan: 21 ft 2 in (6.45 m)
- Wing area: 102.74 sq ft (9.545 m^{2})
- Empty weight: 1,400 lb (635 kg)
- Gross weight: 1,850 lb (839 kg)
- Powerplant: 1 × Hall-Scott L-6a , 250 hp (190 kW)

Performance

- Maximum speed: 190 mph (310 km/h, 170 kn)
- Range: 275 mi (443 km, 239 nmi)
- Service ceiling: 15,000 ft (4,600 m)

== See also ==
- 1920 in aviation (first flight)

Related development

- Dayton-Wright XPS-1

Aircraft of comparable role, configuration, and era

- Nieuport-Delage Sesquiplan

Related lists

- List of racing aircraft
