= Siemens torpedo glider =

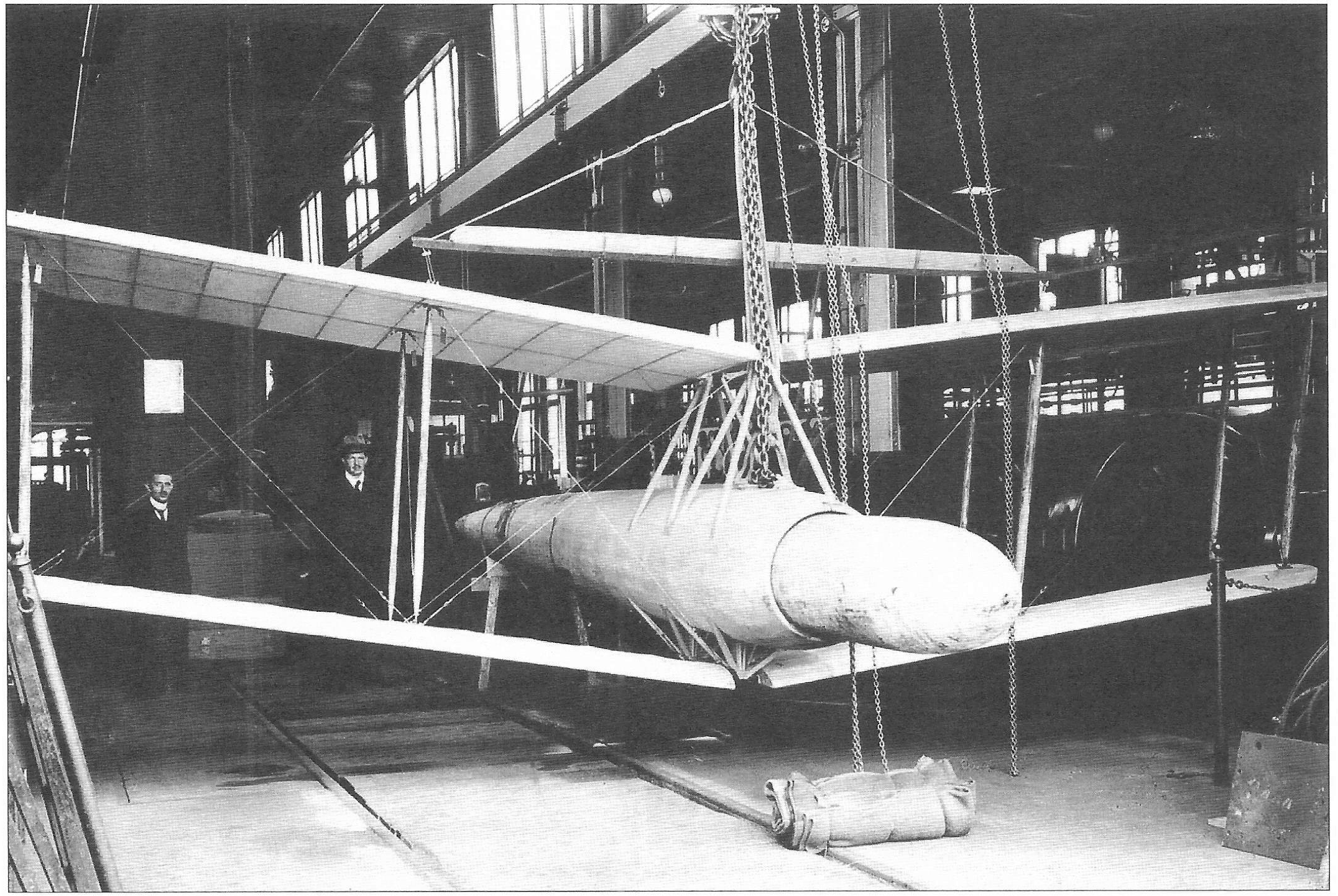
- Torpedo-glider in flight mode
- Type: Anti-surface ship torpedo
- Place of origin: German Empire

Service history
- In service: 1914–1918
- Used by: Imperial German Navy; Reichsmarine (post-war testing)
- Wars: World War I

Production history
- Designer: Wilhelm von Siemens
- Designed: 1914

Specifications
- Mass: 1,000 kilograms (2,200 lb)
- Engine: Turbine
- Guidance system: Wire-guided
- Launch platform: Zeppelin Airships

The Siemens torpedo glider (often referred to as an aerial torpedo) was an early precursor to the modern glide bomb developed in World War I but never used in combat. It featured a naval torpedo attached to an airframe which was to be remotely wire-guided.

== History ==
In October 1914, Dr. Wilhelm von Siemens proposed what became known as the Siemens torpedo glider, a wire-guided flying missile that would have comprised a naval torpedo with an attached airframe. It was not intended that it be flown into a target; rather, at a suitable altitude and position, a signal would have been transmitted which would cause the airframe components to detach from the torpedo which would then enter the water and continue towards its target. Guidance signals were to be transmitted through a thin copper wire unrolled from a 2.5 mi (4.0 km) reel above the fuselage, and guide flares were to be carried to help control.

Siemens-Schuckertwerke was already occupied with remote-controlled anti-shipping motorboats (the FL-boats or Fernlenkboote), and so had some experience in the field of remote control.

Flight testing was performed under the supervision of Dipl. Ing. Dorner from January 1915 onwards, using airships as carriers. Different types of biplane and monoplane airframes were tested, to which a torpedo was fitted, before a biplane layout was adopted due to its greater carrying ability. The last test flight was performed on August 2, 1918. On this flight a 1,000 kilograms (2,200 lb) biplane glider was launched from Zeppelin LZ 80 (L 35). The glider was released from 1,500 metres (4,900 ft) over the Havel river and worked as expected until its control wire that attached the glider to the Zeppelin snapped and the glider spun out of control.

It was planned to use the Siemens-Schuckert R.VIII bomber as a carrier craft, but the Armistice stopped the project.

== See also ==
- Kettering Bug

== Bibliography ==
Notes

References

- Branfill-Cook, Roger (2014). Torpedo: The Complete History of the World's Most Revolutionary Naval Weapon. Seaforth Publishing. ISBN 9781848322158. - Total pages: 256
- Friedman, Norman (2011). Naval Weapons of World War One: Guns, Torpedoes, Mines and ASW Weapons of All Nations. Pen and Sword. ISBN 9781473816664. - Total pages: 320
- Reuter, Claus (2020). The V2 and the German, Russian and American Rocket Program. German Canadian Museum. ISBN 9781894643054.
- Robinson, Anthony (1979). The Illustrated Encyclopedia of Aviation. Marshall Cavendish. p. 2043.
- Sollinger, Gunther (2010). "The Development of Unmanned Aerial Vehicles in Germany (1914 – 1918)" (PDF). RTU Zinātniskie Raksti. Sērija 6, Mašīnzinātne Un Transports = Transport and Engineering, Elektronische Ressource = Scientific Journal of RTU [Scientific Journal of Riga Technical University]. 16: 24–31. ISSN 1407-8015. OCLC 867160613.
- Zeitschrift für Flugwissenschaften und Weltraumforschung (1976) [1957–1958]. "Siemens torpedo glider". English: German Aerospace Society; German Aerospace Research and Research Institute; German Aerospace Research Institute. 5–6. Berlin: Springer: 135–136. ISSN 0342-068X. OCLC 3150219.
