= Kettering Bug =

Experimental unmanned aerial torpedo

Bug
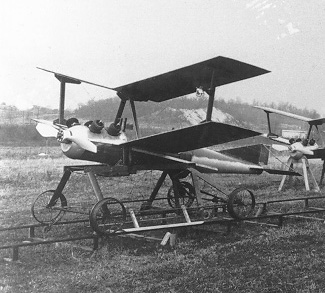

General information
- Type: Missile
- National origin: United States
- Manufacturer: Dayton-Wright Company
- Designer: Charles Kettering

History
- First flight: 2 October 1918

The Kettering Bug was an experimental unmanned aerial torpedo, a forerunner of present-day cruise missiles. It was capable of striking ground targets up to 75 miles (121 km) from its launch point, while traveling at speeds of 50 miles per hour (80 km/h). A successful test flight was made in October 1918. The Bug's costly design and operation inspired Dr. Henry W. Walden to create a rocket that would allow a pilot to control the rocket after launch with the use of radio waves. The British radio controlled weapons of 1917 were secret at this time. These designs were forerunners of modern-day missiles.

== Development ==
In November 1917, about six months after the US declared war on Germany, the United States Army aircraft board asked Charles Kettering of Dayton, Ohio to design an unmanned "flying machine" which could hit a target at a range of 40 miles (64 km). Kettering's design, formally called the Kettering Aerial Torpedo but later known as the Kettering Bug, was built by the Dayton-Wright Airplane Company. Orville Wright acted as an aeronautical consultant on the project, while Elmer Ambrose Sperry designed the control and guidance system. A piloted development aircraft was built as the Dayton-Wright Bug.

The aircraft was powered by a two-stroke V4 40-horsepower (30 kW) DePalma engine. The engine was mass-produced by the Ford Motor Company for about $40 each. The fuselage was constructed of wood laminates and papier-mâché, while the wings were made of cardboard. The "Bug" could fly at a speed of 50 miles per hour (80 km/h). The total cost of each Bug was $400.

The Bug was launched using a dolly-and-track system, similar to the method used by the Wright Brothers when they made their first powered flights in 1903. Once launched, a small onboard gyroscope guided the aircraft to its destination. The control system used a pneumatic/vacuum system, an electric system and an aneroid barometer/altimeter.

To ensure the Bug hit its target, a mechanical system was devised that would track the aircraft's distance flown. Before takeoff, technicians determined the distance to be traveled relative to the air, taking into account wind speed and direction along the flight path. This was used to calculate the total number of engine revolutions needed for the Bug to reach its destination. When a total revolution counter reached this value a cam dropped down which shut off the engine and retracted the bolts attaching the wings, which fell off. The Bug began a ballistic trajectory into the target; the impact detonated the payload of 180 pounds (82 kg) of explosives.

== Flight test ==
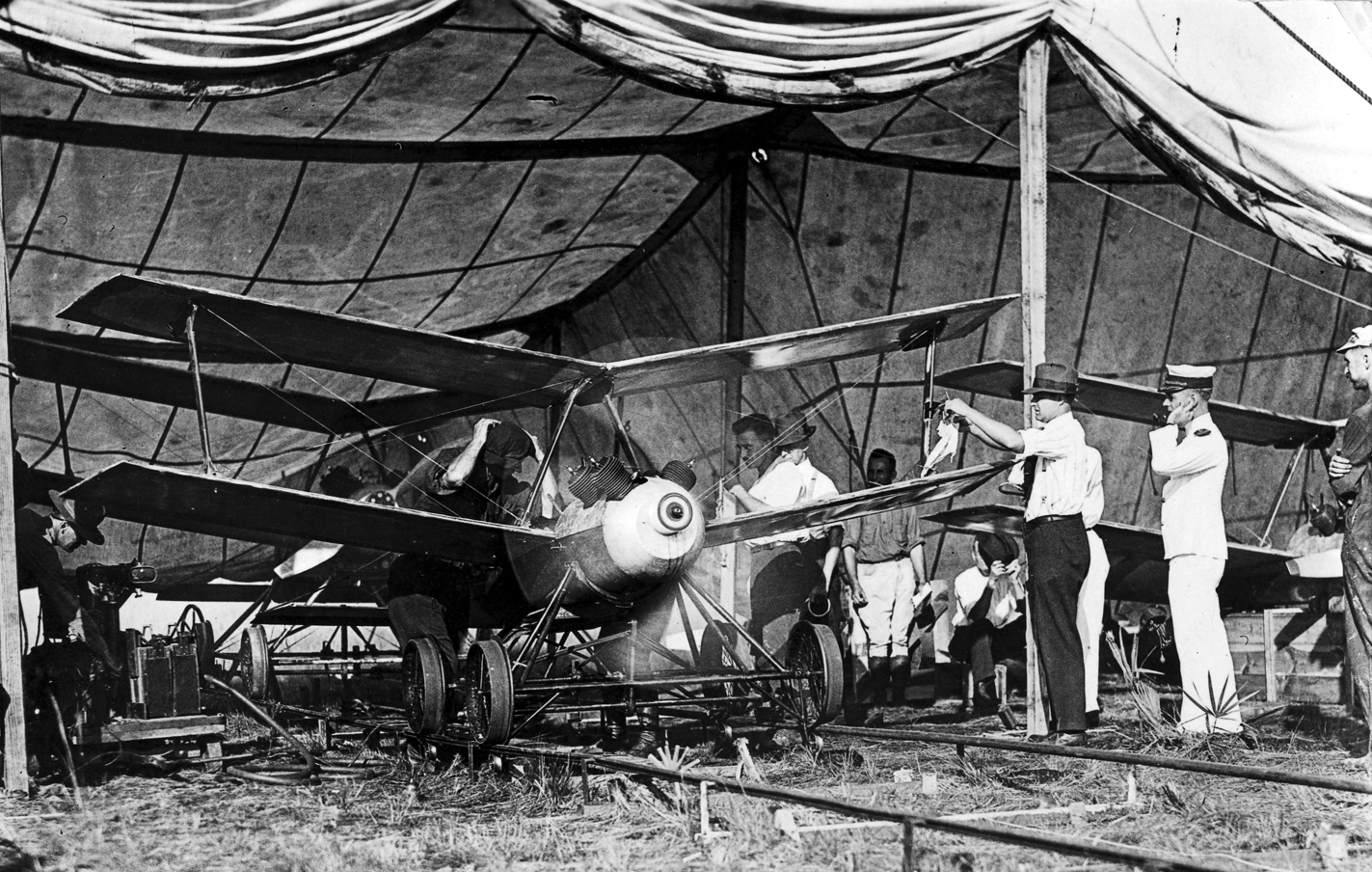
Prototype Kettering Bug (circa 1918)

The prototype Bug was completed and delivered to the Aviation Section of the U.S. Army Signal Corps in 1918, near the end of World War I. The first flight on October 2, 1918 was a failure: the plane climbed too steeply after takeoff, stalled and crashed. Subsequent flights were successful, and the aircraft was demonstrated to Army personnel at Dayton: "The Kettering Bug had 2 successes on 6 attempts at Dayton, 1 of 4 at Amityville, and 4 of 14 at Carlstrom."

Despite some successes during initial testing, the "Bug" was never used in combat. Officials worried about their reliability when carrying explosives over Allied troops. By the time the war ended about 45 Bugs had been produced. The aircraft and its technology remained a secret until World War II.

During the 1920s, what had become the U.S. Army Air Service continued to experiment with the aircraft until funding was withdrawn.

From April 1917 to March 1920 the US Government spent about $275,000 ($3,340,000 in 2025) on the Kettering Bug.

== Surviving aircraft ==
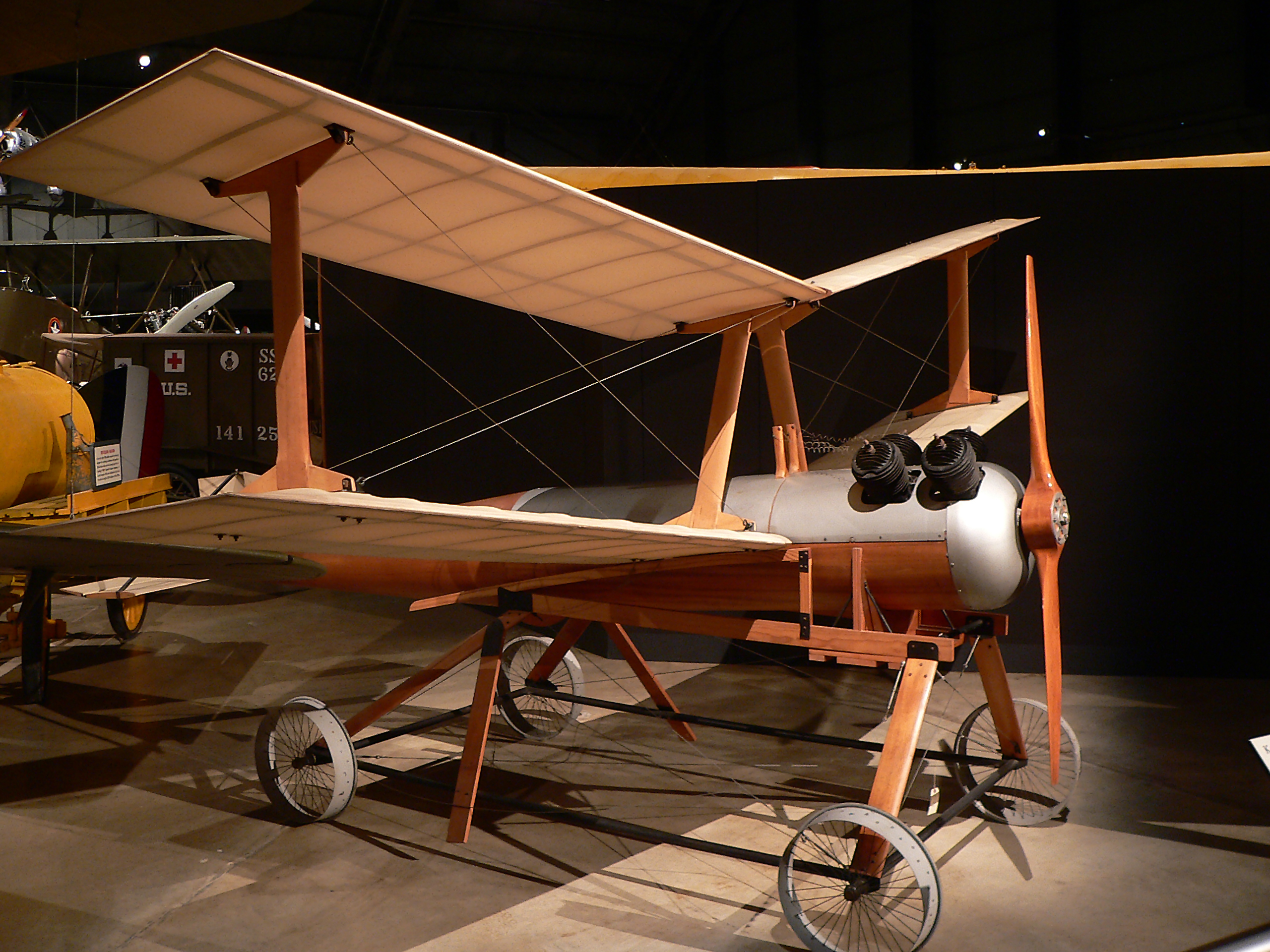
Full size model on display at National Museum of the United States Air Force in Dayton, Ohio

A full-size reproduction of a Bug is on permanent display at the National Museum of the United States Air Force in Dayton, Ohio. It was constructed by Museum staff members, and went on display in 1964.

== Specifications ==
Data from National Museum of the United States Air Force

General characteristics

- Length: 12 ft 6 in (3.8 m)
- Wingspan: 15 ft 0 in (4.5 m)
- Height: 7 ft 8 in (2.3 m)
- Gross weight: 530 lb (240 kg)
- Powerplant: 1 × De Palma V4 piston engine, 40 hp (30 kW)

Performance

- Maximum speed: 120 mph (190 km/h, 100 kn)
- Cruise speed: 50 mph (80 km/h, 43 kn)
- Range: 75 mi (121 km, 65 nmi)

Armament
180 lb (82 kg) high explosive

== See also ==
- British unmanned aerial vehicles of World War I
- Hewitt-Sperry Automatic Airplane
- RAE Larynx
- Siemens torpedo glider
- V-1 flying bomb
