= Impéria Automobiles =

Belgian automobile manufacturer

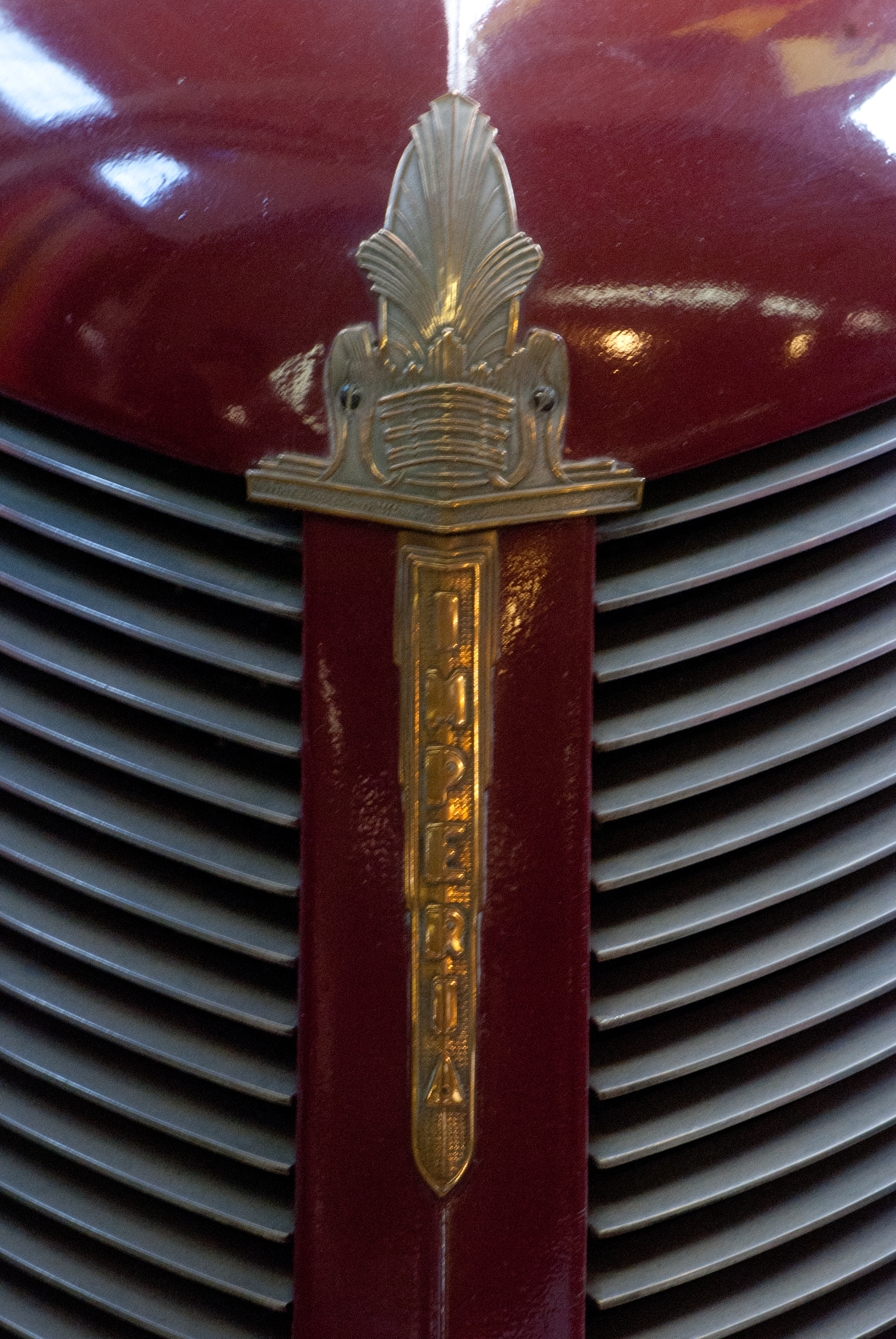
- Industry: Automobiles
- Founded: 1904
- Founder: Adrien Piedbœuf
- Defunct: 1958
- Headquarters: Nessonvaux, Belgium
- Products: Luxury and racing automobiles

Impéria Automobiles was a Belgian manufacturer of automobiles, active between 1906 and 1948. Its factory in Nessonvaux, Liège had a rooftop test track since 1928.

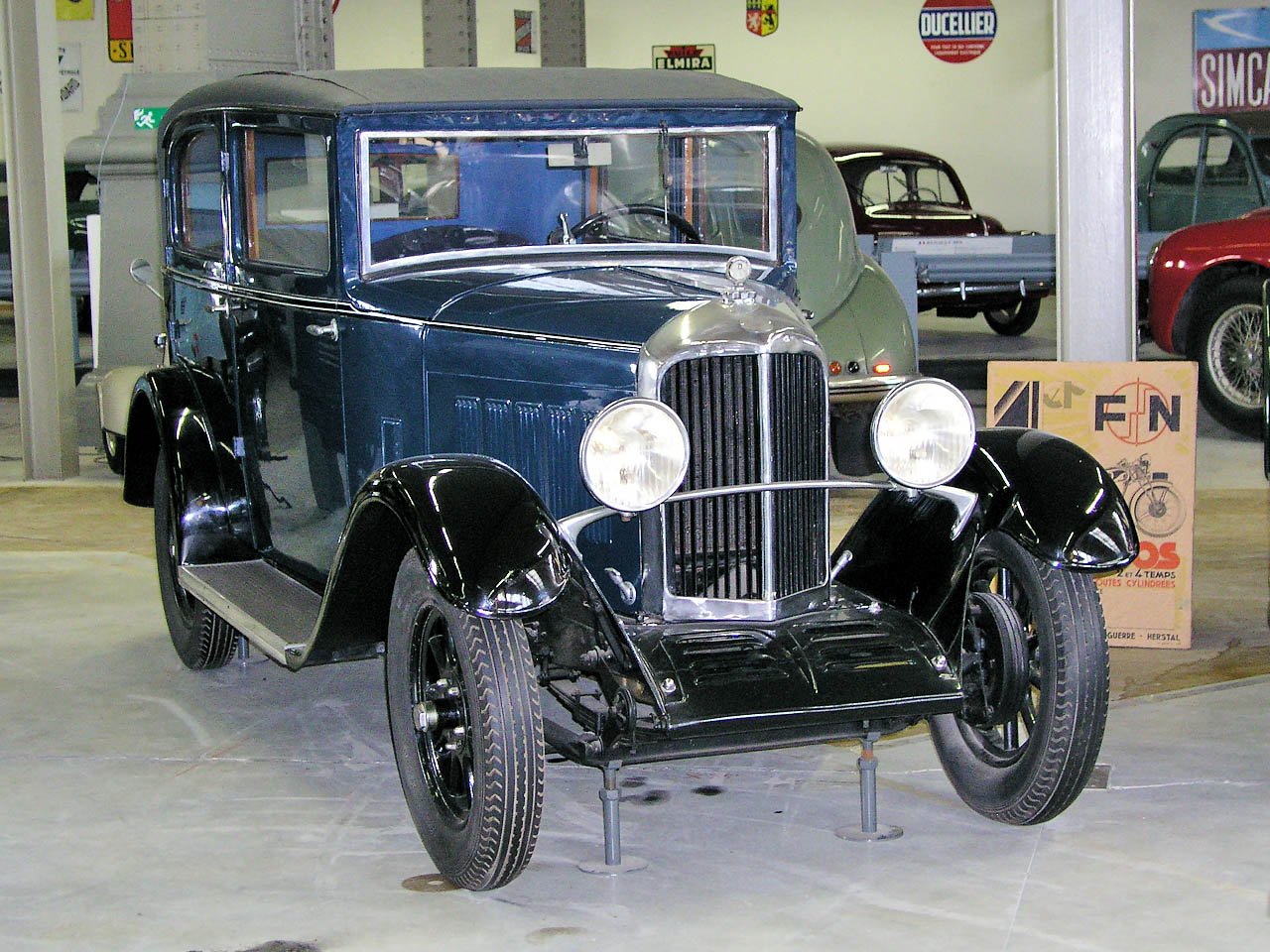
Imperia 7-25 CV from 1932

== History ==
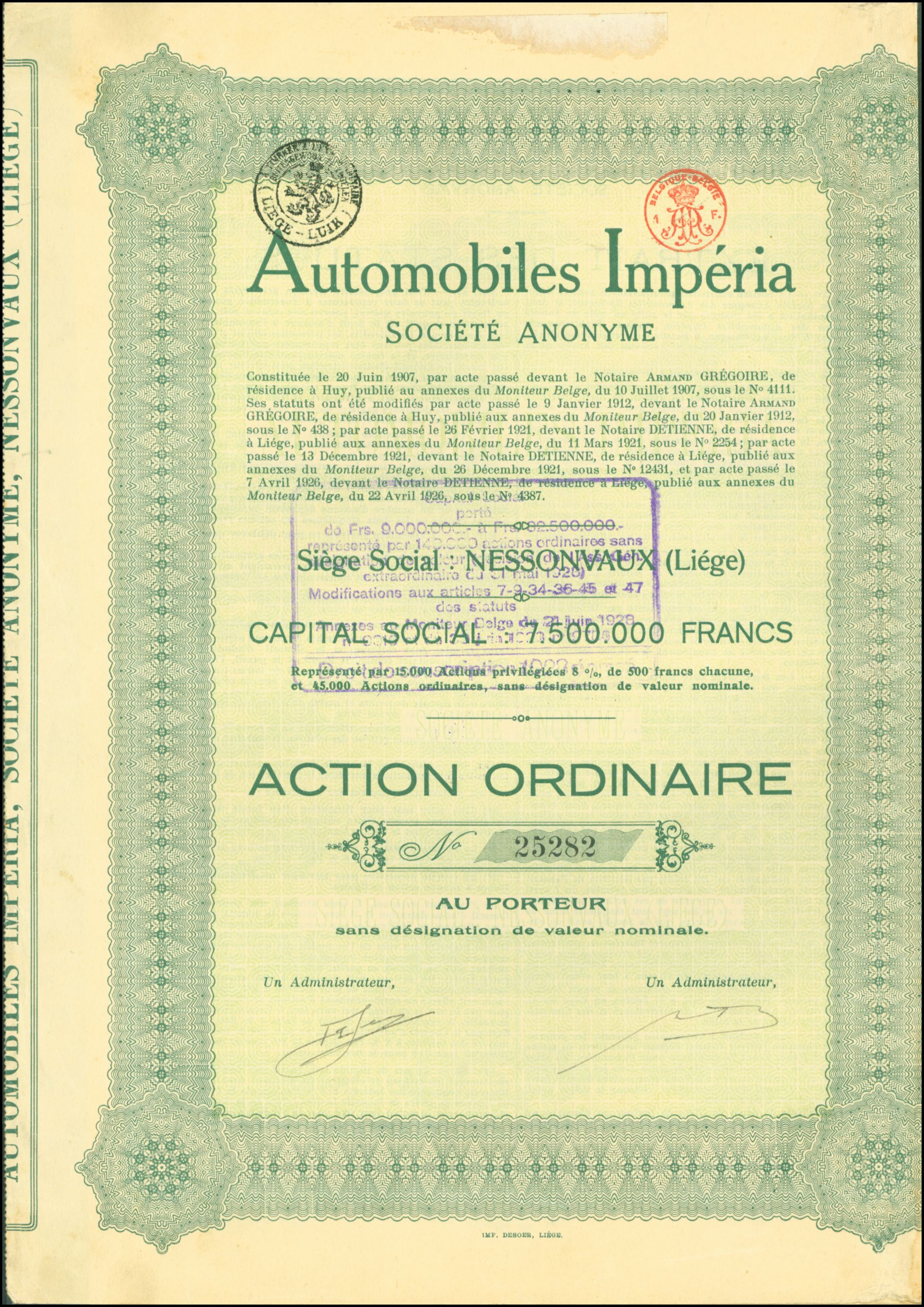
Share of the Automobiles Impéria SA, issued 22 April 1926

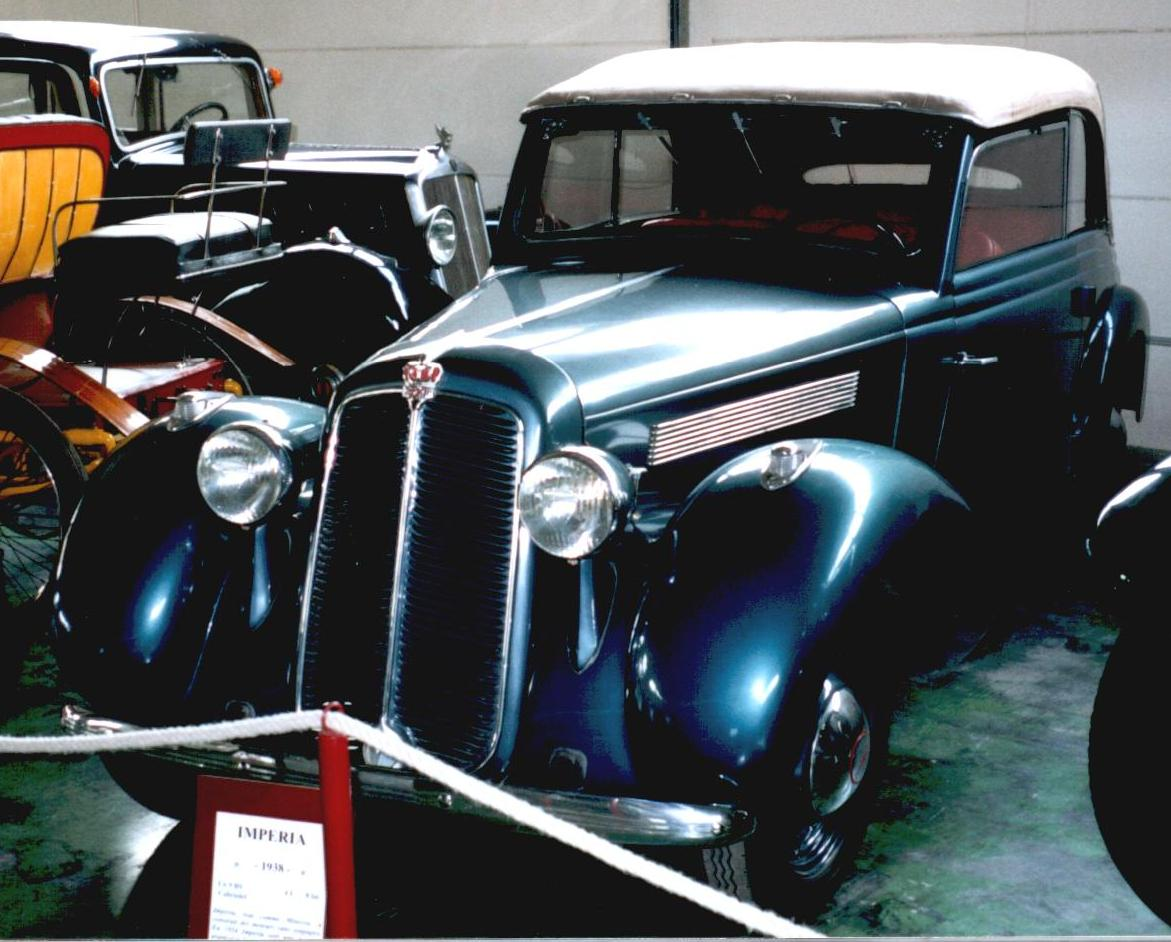
Imperia TA-9 BS 1938

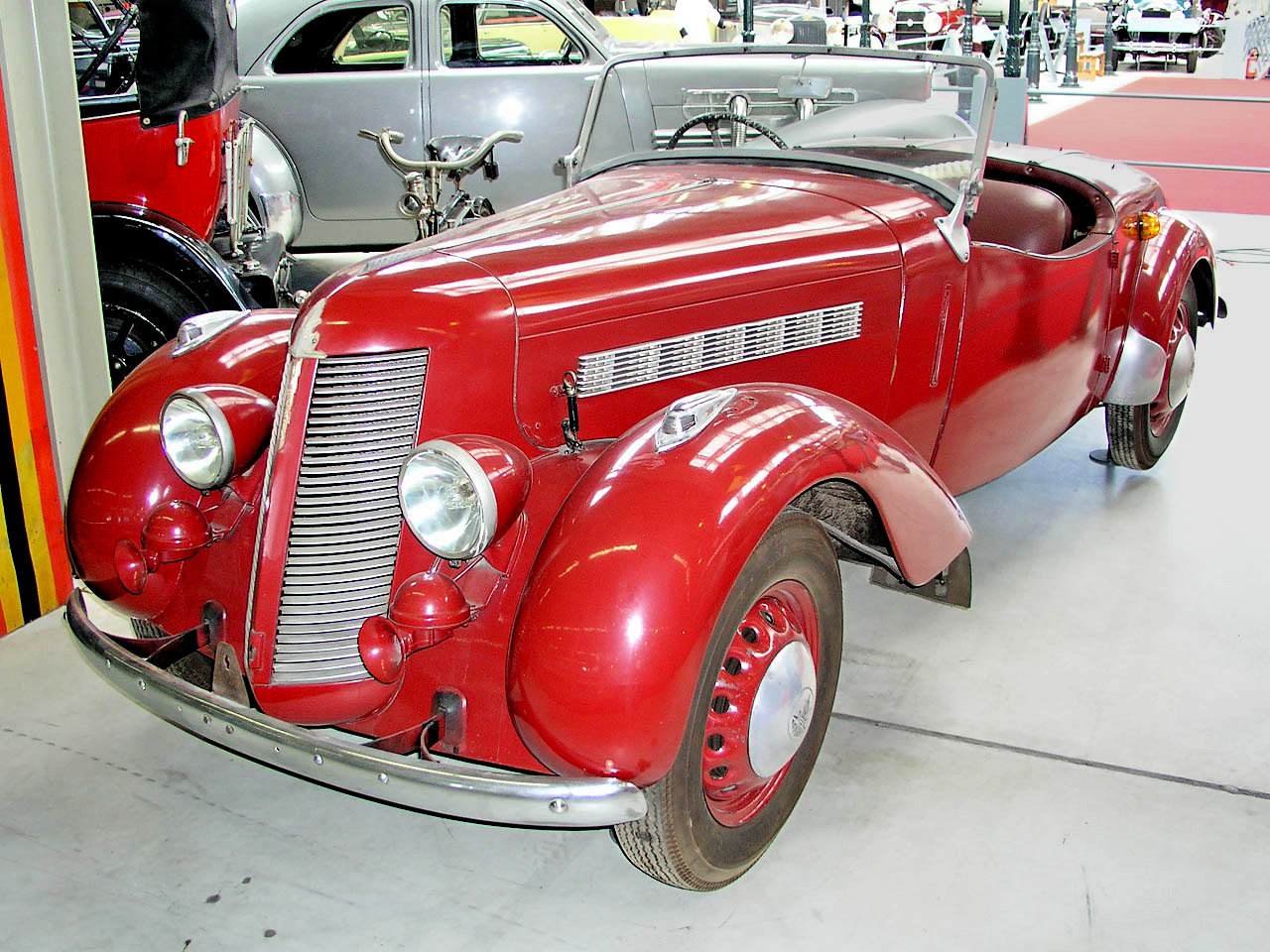
Imperia TA-8 Sport

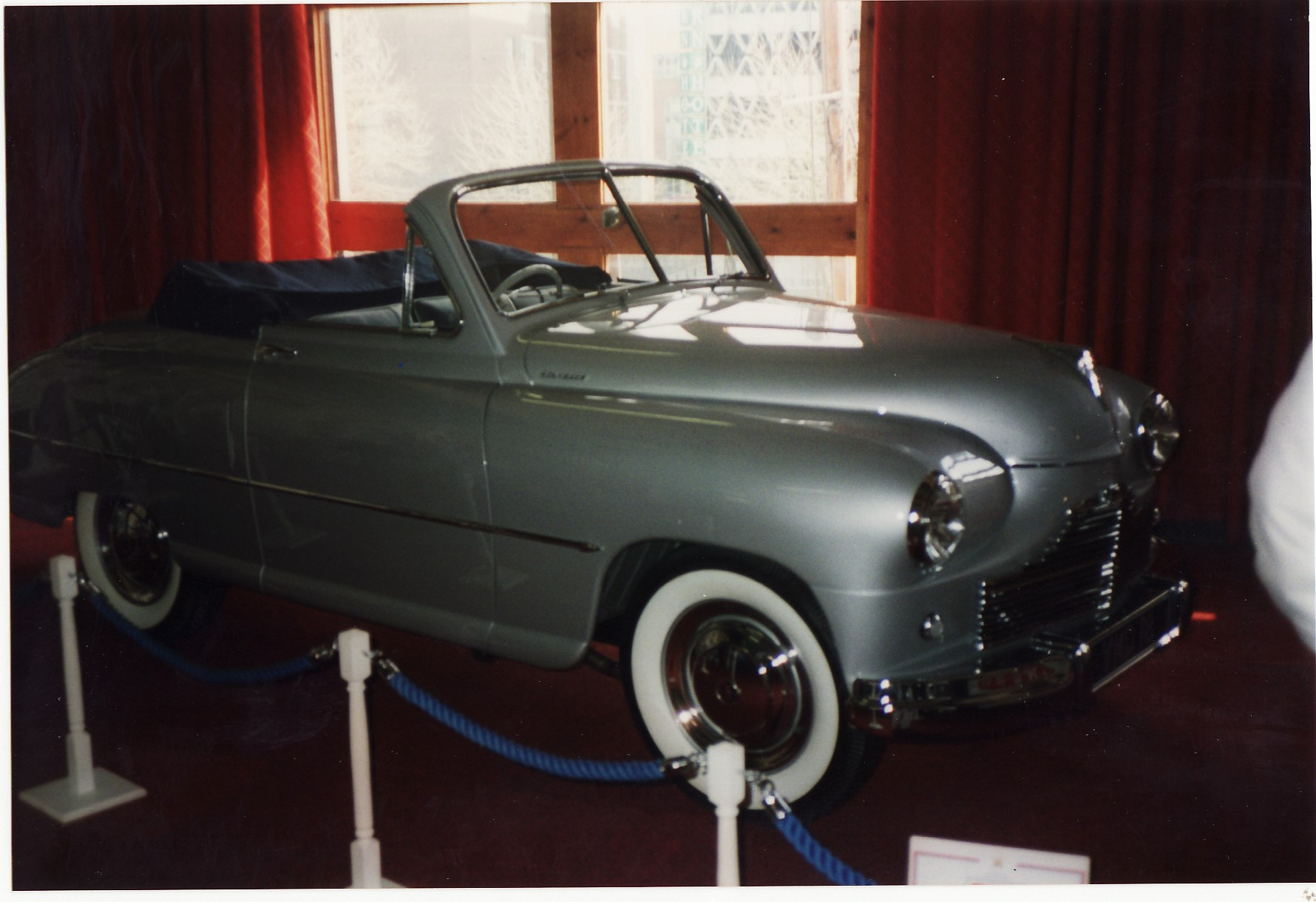
Standard Vanguard convertible built by Imperia

Impéria was a Belgian automobile manufacturer from 1906 until 1948. Products of the Ateliers Piedboeuf of Liège, the first cars were designed by German, Paul Henze. These were four-cylinders of 3, 4.9, and 9.9 litres. The next year, the company moved to Nessonvaux, Trooz municipality, and began production in the old Pieper factory. Impéria produced a monobloc 12 hp (8.9 kW) in 1909. In 1910, the company merged with Springuel.

The Nessonvaux factory began producing Abadals under license as Impéria-Abadals from about 1916. In 1921, it built three ohc 5.6-litre straight-eights. These were quickly replaced by an ephemeral ohc 3-litre 32-valve four-cylinder which had a top speed of 90 mph (140 km/h). This was followed by an 1100 cc slide-valve 11/22 hp four designed by Couchard, one of the first cars ever built with a sunroof. Its engine rotated counterclockwise, and its transmission brake also served as a servo for those on the front wheels. In 1927, a six-cylinder of 1624 cc appeared; this had been available in three-carburettor Super Sports form from 1930.

In 1925, the company hired Louis de Monge as chief research engineer. Some of his work included torsion bar suspension and automatic transmissions. De Monge left in 1937 to join Bugatti, where he would design the Bugatti 100P racer plane.

Around and on top of the factory buildings, there was a test track over 1 km long. The track was built in 1928. The only other rooftop test tracks were on Fiat's Lingotto plant, opened in 1923, and Palacio Chrysler in Buenos Aires, opened in 1928.

Over the course of four years, Impéria took over three other Belgian car manufacturers: Métallurgique (1927), Excelsior (1929), and Nagant (1931). From 1934 until the company folded it built mainly front-wheel-drive Adlers with Belgian-made coachwork. The company merged with Minerva in 1934, but they split in 1939.

In addition to its production in Belgium, Impéria made a number of cars in Great Britain; these were assembled at a factory in Maidenhead.

From 1947 to 1949, Impéria built its last model, the TA-8, which combined an Adler Trumpf Junior-type chassis with a Hotchkiss engine originally intended for the Amilcar Compound.

After 1948, Impéria assembled Standard Vanguards under license and also built a unique convertible version. After Standard decided to set up a new factory in Belgium, the factory was left without work and had to close doors in 1957.

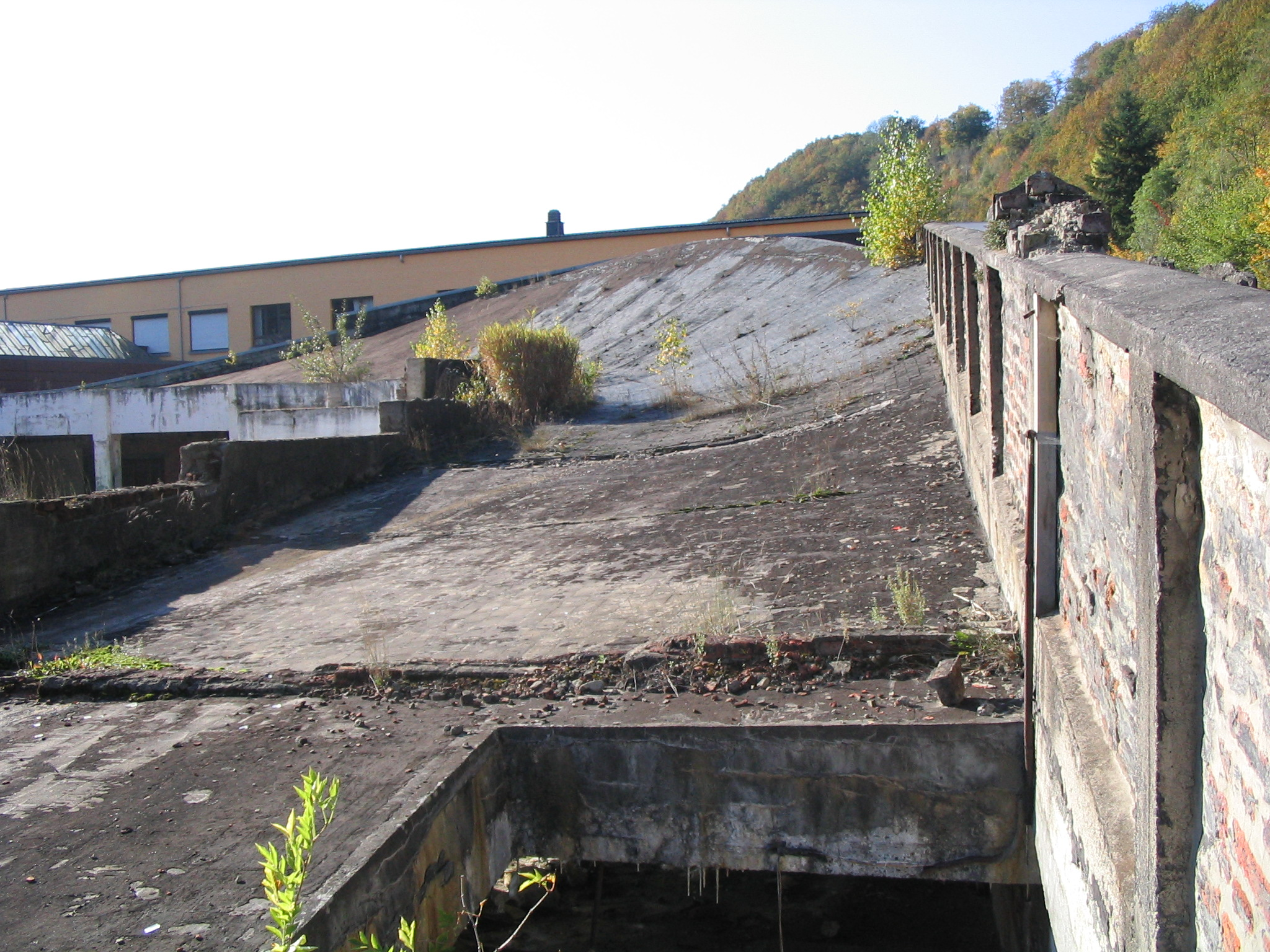
Imperia Nessonvaux piste

== 2009 revival ==
In 2008, Green Propulsion purchased the rights to Imperia Automotive for €400.

The company announced a revival model, the Imperia GP which featured a BMW/ PSA sourced engine with an electric motor.

Preorders were open in 2008, but many design changes and re-prototyping, with concomitant rescheduling, were announced between 2009 and 2015, when the company's illiquidity was brought to the commercial court. A takeover proposal of luxury cars converter Carat-Duchatelet was refused by the court, which declared the bankruptcy.
