= Buscaylet-de Monge 7-5 =

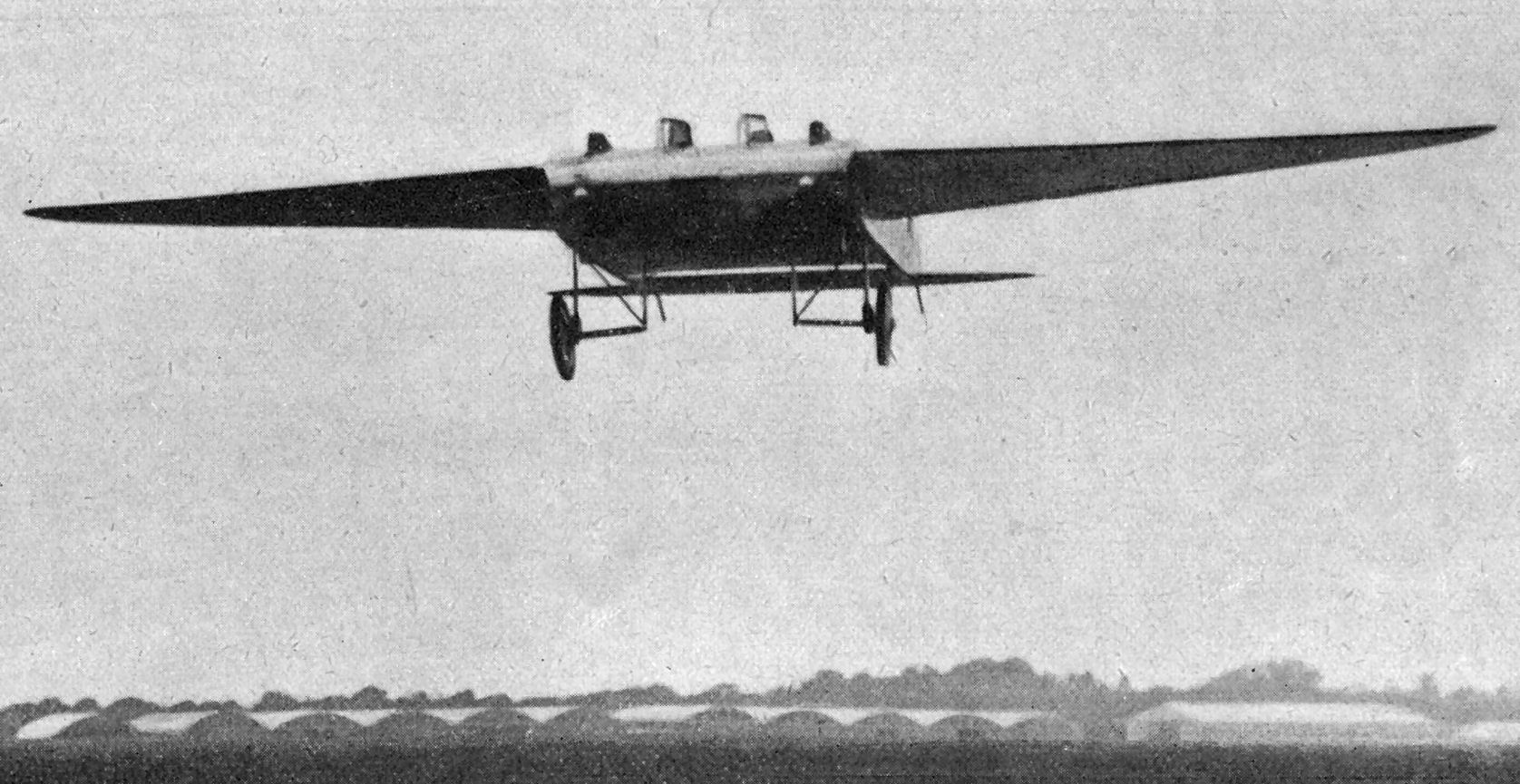

General information
- Type: Experimental aircraft
- National origin: France
- Manufacturer: Ateliers Buscaylet père et fils, Bobin et Louis de Monge

History
- First flight: 1925
- Developed from: Buscaylet-de Monge 7-4

The Buscaylet-de Monge 7-5 was a twin engine, twin-boom aircraft without a fuselage but with pilot, passenger and fuel accommodated in a thickened wing centre-section. It was designed by Belgian pioneer Louis de Monge and built in France in the mid-1920s.

== Design and development ==
The Buscaylet-de Monge 7-4 was built in 1923 as a one third scale flight model of the proposed de Monge 72 (or 7–2) tri-motor. The de Monge 7-5 was a development of the 1923 aircraft, retaining its configuration but with new engines and revised wings, tail, accommodation and undercarriage.

Structurally the de Monge 7-5 was an all-wood aircraft. It had no fuselage but instead a thickened section of wing between the two booms which supported the tail. This rectangular inner panel had an airfoil section profile and an increased span of 2.3 m (7 ft 7 in), 15% larger than on the 7.4 but with the same 3.0 m (9 ft 10 in) chord and thickness of 650 mm (26 in). The increase in span allowed the engines, new Bugatti water-cooled car-type 1.50 L (92 cu in), 34 kW (45 hp) inline engines to be placed far enough apart that the propeller disks did not overlap, obviating the need for engine canting. Each engine had a rectangular radiator under it. As before the centre-section contained two side-by-side seats but their cockpits were now separate and provided with windscreens and faired headrests. As before they were positioned between the two spruce and plywood box spars, with fuel tanks on either side. Forward of the cockpit the centre-section was ply skinned, with fabric covering elsewhere.

The much thinner section cantilever outer wing panels beyond the booms had the strong straight taper of its predecessor but with elliptical, instead of straight, clipped, tips. They carried long but not full-span ailerons. Like the centre-section the outer wings were built on pairs of spars.

The 7-5's twin booms were attached to brackets on the rear corners of the centre-section; the booms were longer than on the 7–4, placing the elevator hinge about 1 m (3 ft 3 in) further behind the centre-section trailing edge. Curved, balanced control surfaces replaced the earlier unbalanced ones. Its elevator was elliptical in plan with the straight-edged tailplane projecting forward.

It had a tailskid undercarriage with independently mounted wheels 1.665 m (5 ft 5.6 in) apart. Each wheel was mounted on its own axle, about 700 mm (28 in) long and hinged at its inner end to a vertical strut from the inboard fuselage underside and another, outward leaning one above the axle to the centre-section near its edge. A faired vertical leg with a steel tube core from near the edge supported the outer axle end on a rubber shock absorber. Four cables supplied fore-and-aft rigidity.

The de Monge 7-5 was exhibited at the 1924 9th Paris Salon as an experimental type. The exact date of its first flight is not known but flight trials were ongoing in July 1925. By January 1926 the type was described as powered by 34 kW (45 hp) Vaslin engines, with a top speed of 180 km/h (110 mph) and an endurance at full power of 3.50 hrs. It was "readily convertible" into an ambulance aircraft with room for one wounded man and a nurse, or for two wounded. It is not known if these engines were ever fitted nor if any examples beyond the prototype were completed.

Even though its primary purpose was to assist the design of the de Monge 72, because of its low power and aerodynamic cleanliness the de Monge 7-5 was, like the de Monge 7-4 before it, seen as a contender in fuel economy based competitions and for endurance and distance flight records. In May 1926 Captain Cousin was preparing for an endurance record attempt, flying continuously between Paris and Rouen. In July 1926 the 7–5, sponsored by its propeller maker Lumière, was one of seventeen aircraft from six countries entered in the Concours d'Avions Economique, held in August. There was a suggestion in December 1926 that the 7–5, re-engined with Salmson radials of 30 kW (40 hp) and carrying 700–800 L (150–180 imp gal; 180–210 US gal) of fuel might have a range of 5,000–6,000 km (3,100–3,700 mi). The absence of further reports suggests none of these projects led to success.

== Specifications ==
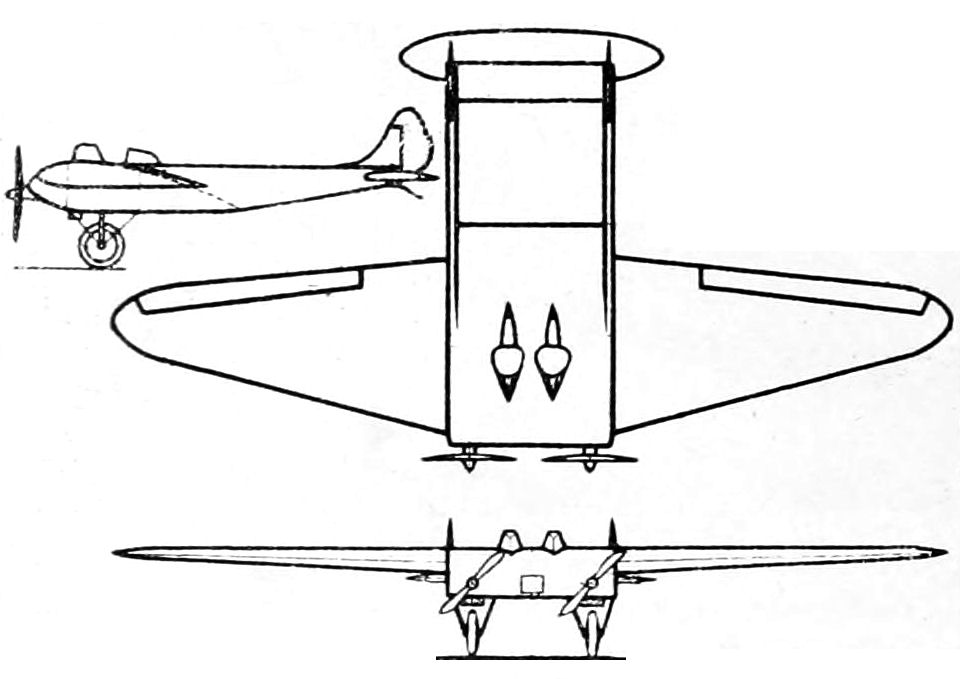
Buscaylet-de Monge 7-5 3-view drawing from Aero Digest June 1926

Data from Les Ailes, June 1925 except where noted

General characteristics

- Crew: One
- Capacity: One passenger
- Length: 5.97 m (19 ft 7 in)
- Wingspan: 11.50 m (37 ft 9 in)
- Height: 1.49 m (4 ft 11 in)
- Wing area: 21 m^{2} (230 sq ft)
- Empty weight: 485 kg (1,069 lb)
- Gross weight: 784 kg (1,728 lb)
- Fuel capacity: 50 L (11 imp gal; 13 US gal)
- Powerplant: 2 × Bugatti 4-cylinder water-cooled inline, 1.5 L (92 cu in) swept volume, 34 kW (45 hp) each (some sources quote lower powers)
- Propellers: 2-bladed Lumière, 1.30 m (4 ft 3 in) diameter

Performance

- Maximum speed: 170 km/h (110 mph, 92 kn)
- Cruise speed: 153 km/h (95 mph, 83 kn)
- Time to altitude: 24 min to 2,000 m (6,600 ft)
