= Enrique Cardona =

Spanish industrialist and sports leader (1871–1966)

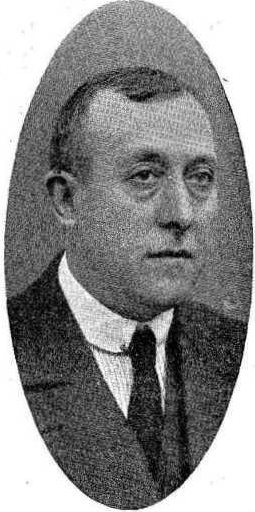
- Cardona in 1917

16th President of FC Barcelona
- In office 23 June 1923 – 1 June 1924
- Preceded by: Joan Gamper
- Succeeded by: Joan Gamper

Personal details
- Born: Enric Cardona i Panella; 1871; Barcelona, Spain
- Died: 1966 (aged 94–95); Barcelona, Spain

Enrique Cardona Panella (1871 – October 1966) was a Catalan industrialist and a sports leader, who served as the 16th president of FC Barcelona in 1923 and 1924.

== Early and personal life ==
Enrique Cardona was born in 1871, as the son of Antoni Cardona and Rita Panella i Lafont. He married Eulàlia Canadell i Paradeda, with whom he had two children, Luis and Rita Cardona i Canadell.

== Sporting career ==
In his youth, Cardona practiced cycling, becoming a member and secretary of the Club Velocipèdic, and later president of the Club Velocipédico de Durán, a society made up of close and true friends who were cycling enthusiasts. Under his leadership, he oversaw the construction and inauguration of a ground-floor building to house the club and shelter the cyclists from the rain upon returning from their excursions.

Despite his "tatanic work", Cardona was unable to prevent the club's dissolution, with several of its members going on to join the ranks of FC Barcelona, including Cardona, who served as treasurer in the club's committee, where he stood out as a highly skilled administrator. In late 1917, he was named as vice-president of Barcelona, but he insulted those who voted for him by refusing the position. A few days later, on 17 November 1917, the journalist Narciso Masferrer wrote and published an article about him in the newspaper Los Deportes, in which he dared "to once again invite my dear friend [Cardona] to fill the vacant position, alongside his friends from the club he most sympathizes with", but to no avail. Around this time, at the request of his cycling friend Paco Abadal, he entered the automotive world with the acquisition of an Abadal-Buick.

On 23 June 1923, Cardona replaced Joan Gamper as the 16th president of FC Barcelona, a position that he held for less than a year, until June 1924, when he was replaced by Gamper. At a time, the club had already become a symbol of Catalanism, so when the dictatorship of Primo de Rivera began a few months later, Barça became a persecuted club, which forced Cardona to warn the fans to behave correctly at all times to avoid problems from getting worse. In his only season at the helm of the club, Barça comfortably won the Catalan championship with 10 out of 10 victories.

== Later life ==
In 1929, his company was tasked with supplying the toilets for the newly established Montjuïc Stadium. In 1930, Cardona was appointed councillor of the City Council of Barcelona, and as such, he proposed the creation of a municipal commission to promote the practice of sports and manage the sports facilities on Montjuïc.

== Death ==
Cardona died in October 1966, at the age of 95.
