= Louis de Monge =

Louis de Monge (Vicomte Pierre Louis de Monge de Franeau) (1890– 25 July 1977, New York) was a notable Belgian engineer. He is mainly remembered as the designer of the Bugatti Model 100 racing aircraft.

== Career ==
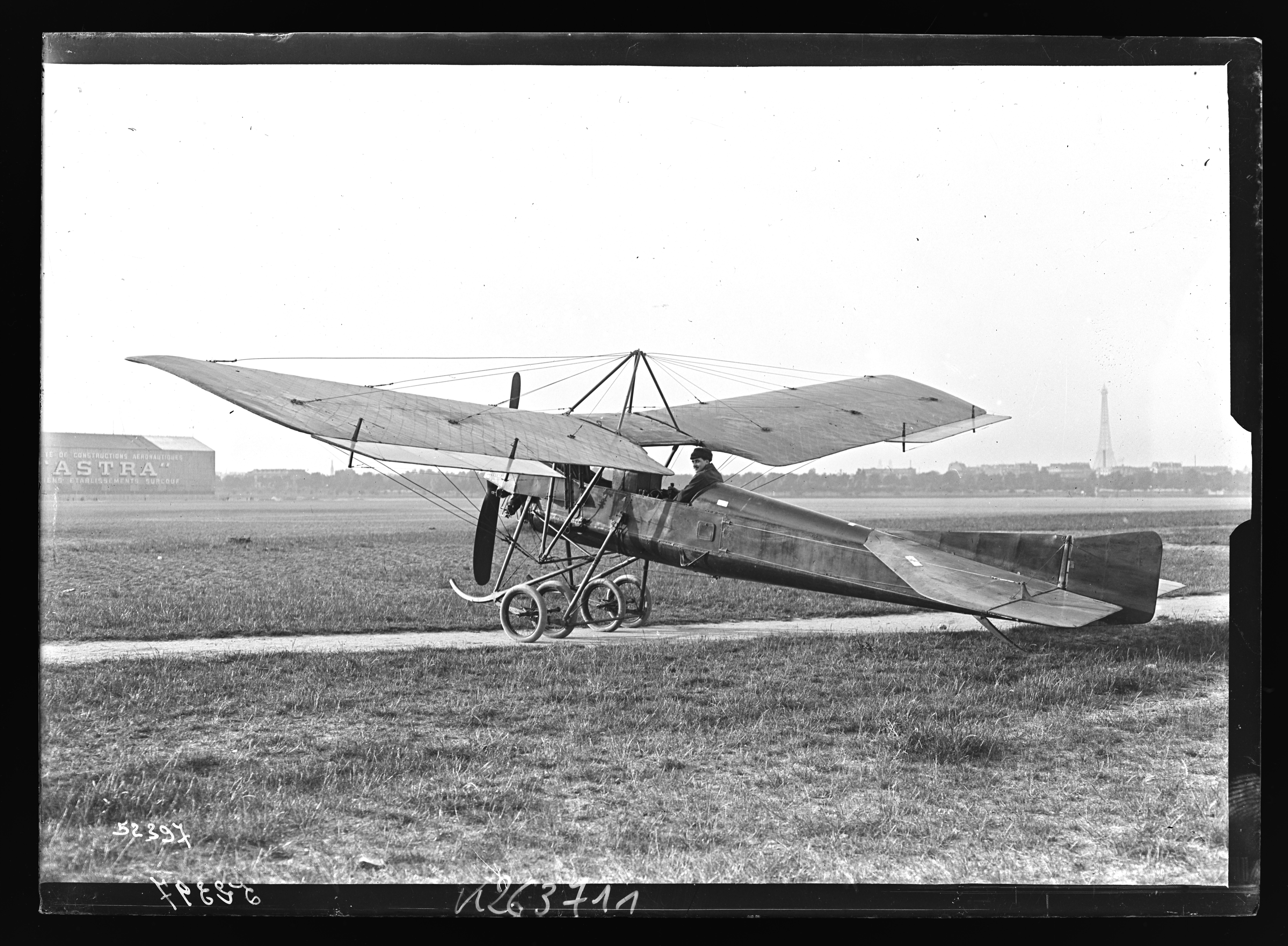
Louis de Monge's parasol wing racer at the Concours Securite in 1914.

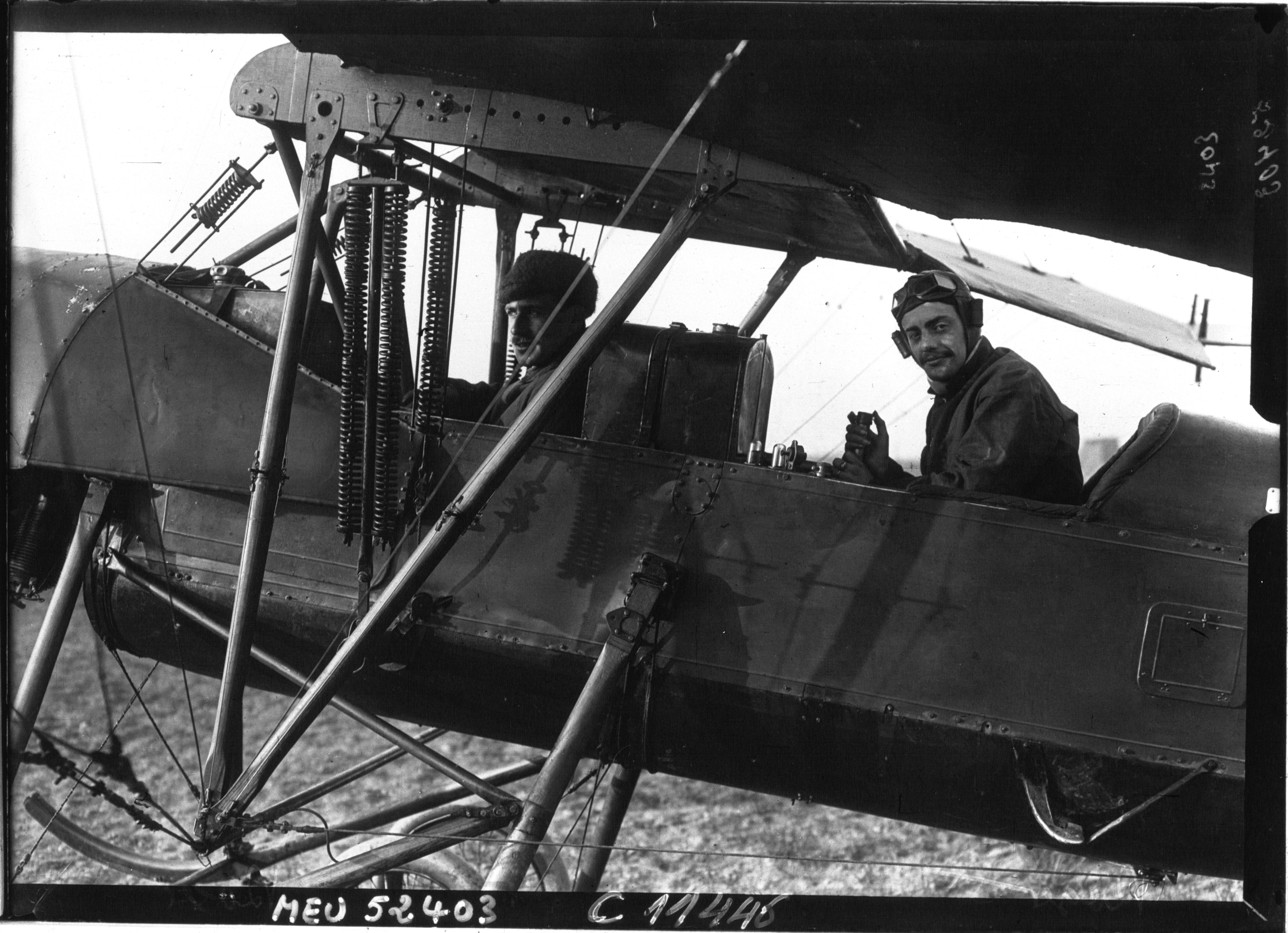
De Monge's design had a wing that flexed with the air flow. The springs automatically returned the wing to its normal position.

He was interested in aircraft from his childhood and by 1907 had begun to explore ways of automatically stabilizing aircraft. These studies culminated in 1914 with the construction of such a machine, which flew successfully in turbulent conditions on 15 June 1914. In 1915 he produced another autostabilized aircraft, a biplane with a propeller in the centre of its fuselage.

During World War I he was granted patents for methods of in-flight disposal of burning fuel, of metal propellers and for bomb releases. Towards the end of the war he flew with the Belgian Air Force and completed a series of calculations over propeller efficiency. The rights to use these designs was bought by La Maison Lumière and at the end of the war de Monge helped to set up S.A. Establissements Lumière and became its Administrator-Delegate. The company employed Sébastienne Guyot, an early woman aeronautical engineer. It was in their workshops that his first post-war aircraft, the Lumière-de Monge racer, sometimes referred to as the Lumière-de Monge 5/1.

de Monge was then hired by Buscaylet Père et Fils-Bobin, building a fighter version of the racer, the Buscaylet-de Monge 5/2. Later, he designed twin-engined, twin boomed, lifting body aircraft with the experimental Buscaylet-de Monge 7-4 and its development the 7-5 as small scale aerodynamic models of the proposed, three times larger, de Monge 72. The rights to these were acquired by Bordeaux shipbuilders Dyle et Bacalan who wanted to develop transatlantic airliners from them. They built a series of military prototypes, starting with the Dyle et Bacalan DB-10 heavy bomber of 1926.

In 1925, de Monge joined car and motorcycle makers Impéria at Liège as chief research engineer. Some of his work there included torsion bar suspension and automatic transmissions.

de Monge left Impéria in 1937 to join Ettore Bugatti, where he designed the Bugatti Model 100 racing aircraft. This had been almost completed in Paris in 1940 but when France was occupied by Germany it was moved to the French countryside, where it was hidden for the next thirty years. It eventually went to the US and is now in the EAA AirVenture Museum.
