= Buscaylet-de Monge 5/2 =

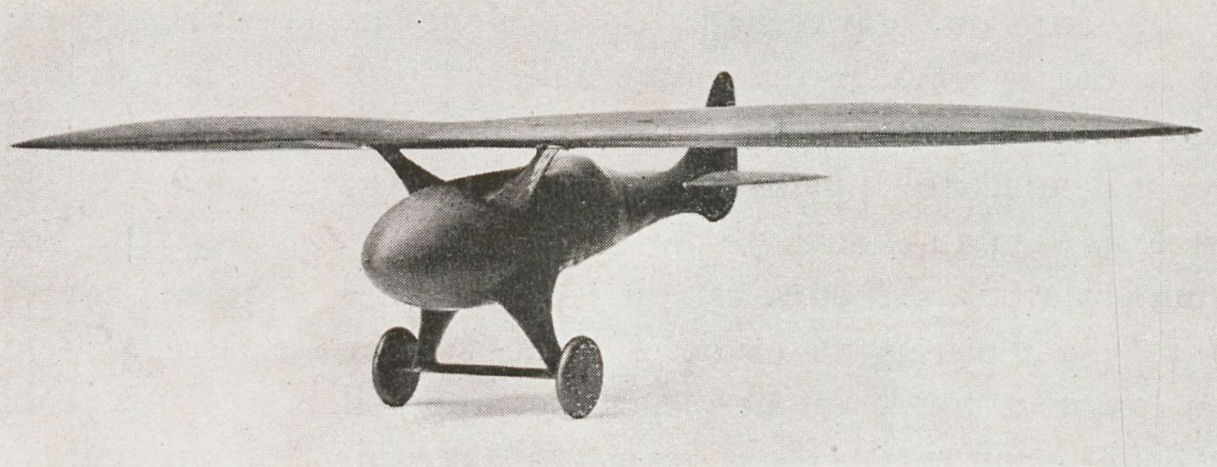
- Wind tunnel model

General information
- Type: Single-seat fighter
- National origin: France
- Manufacturer: Buscaylet et Cie
- Designer: Louis de Monge
- Number built: 1

History
- First flight: 1923
- Developed from: Lumière-de Monge racer

The Buscaylet-de Monge 5/2 was a 1920s French single-seat, parasol-wing fighter prototype designed by Louis de Monge for the Buscaylet et Cie company.

== Design and development ==
The 5/2 was based on de Monge's earlier Lumière-de Monge racer (possibly designated de Monge 5/1) and was of metal construction with both wood and metal skinning. The 5/2 was powered by a 300 hp (224 kW) Hispano-Suiza 8Fb inline piston engine. The parasol-wing fighter retained the ability inherited from the Lumière-de Monge to attach stub-wings to convert the aircraft to a sesquiplane. The aircraft was intended to use two forward-firing synchronised machine guns but they were not fitted to the prototype. The 5/2 was first flown in 1923, but after testing, it was assessed as too advanced for use and development was abandoned.

== Specification ==
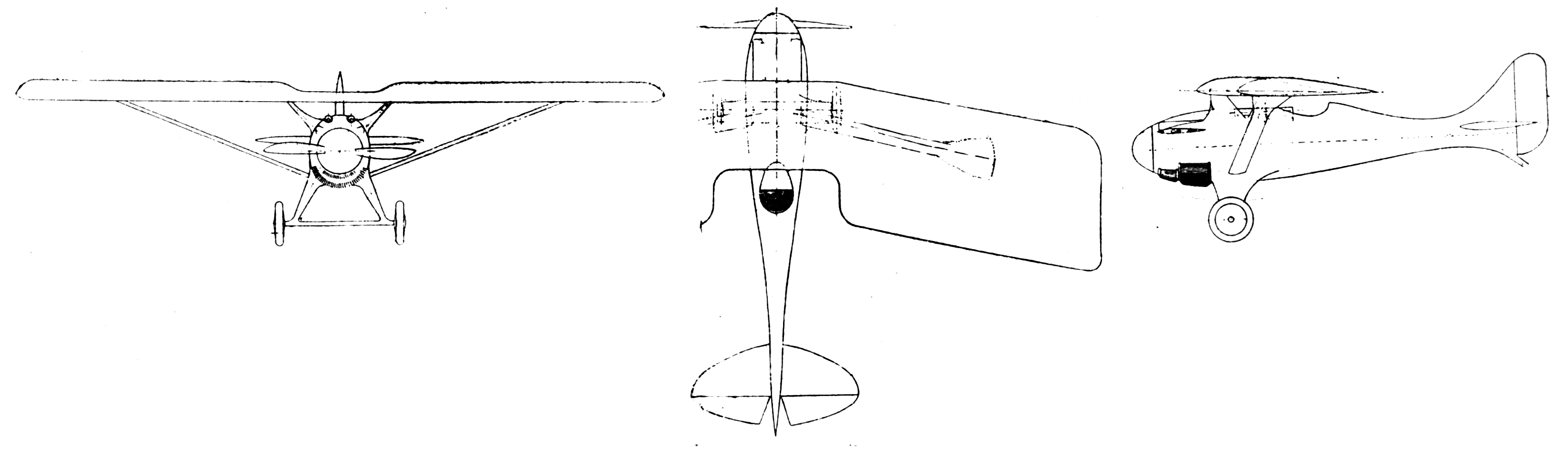
Buscaylet-de Monge 5/2 3-view drawing from L'Aéronautique December,1922

Data from The Illustrated Encyclopedia of Aircraft, Jane's all the World's Aircraft 1924

General characteristics

- Crew: 1
- Length: 7.15 m (23 ft 5 in)
- Wingspan: 10.90 m (35 ft 9 in)
- Height: 2.70 m (8 ft 10 in)
- Wing area: 24.00 m^{2} (258.3 sq ft)
- Gross weight: 1,392 kg (3,069 lb)
- Powerplant: 1 × Hispano-Suiza 8Fb 8-cylinder inline piston, 220 kW (300 hp)
- Propellers: 2-bladed fixed-pitch propeller, 2.25 m (7 ft 5 in) diameter

Performance

- Maximum speed: 270 km/h (170 mph, 150 kn) at sea level; 250 km/h (160 mph; 130 kn) at 4,000 m (13,000 ft)
- Service ceiling: 7,500 m (24,600 ft)
- Wing loading: 58 kg/m^{2} (12 lb/sq ft)
- Power/mass: 0.161 kW/kg (0.098 hp/lb)

Armament

- Guns: two forward-firing synchronised 0.303 in (7.70 mm) machine-guns (intended)

== Bibliography ==
- Bruner, Georges (1977). "Fighters a la Francaise, Part One". Air Enthusiast (3): 85–95. ISSN 0143-5450.
