= Trooz =

Municipality in Liège Province, Wallonia, Belgium

Trooz Li Trô (Walloon)
- Municipality
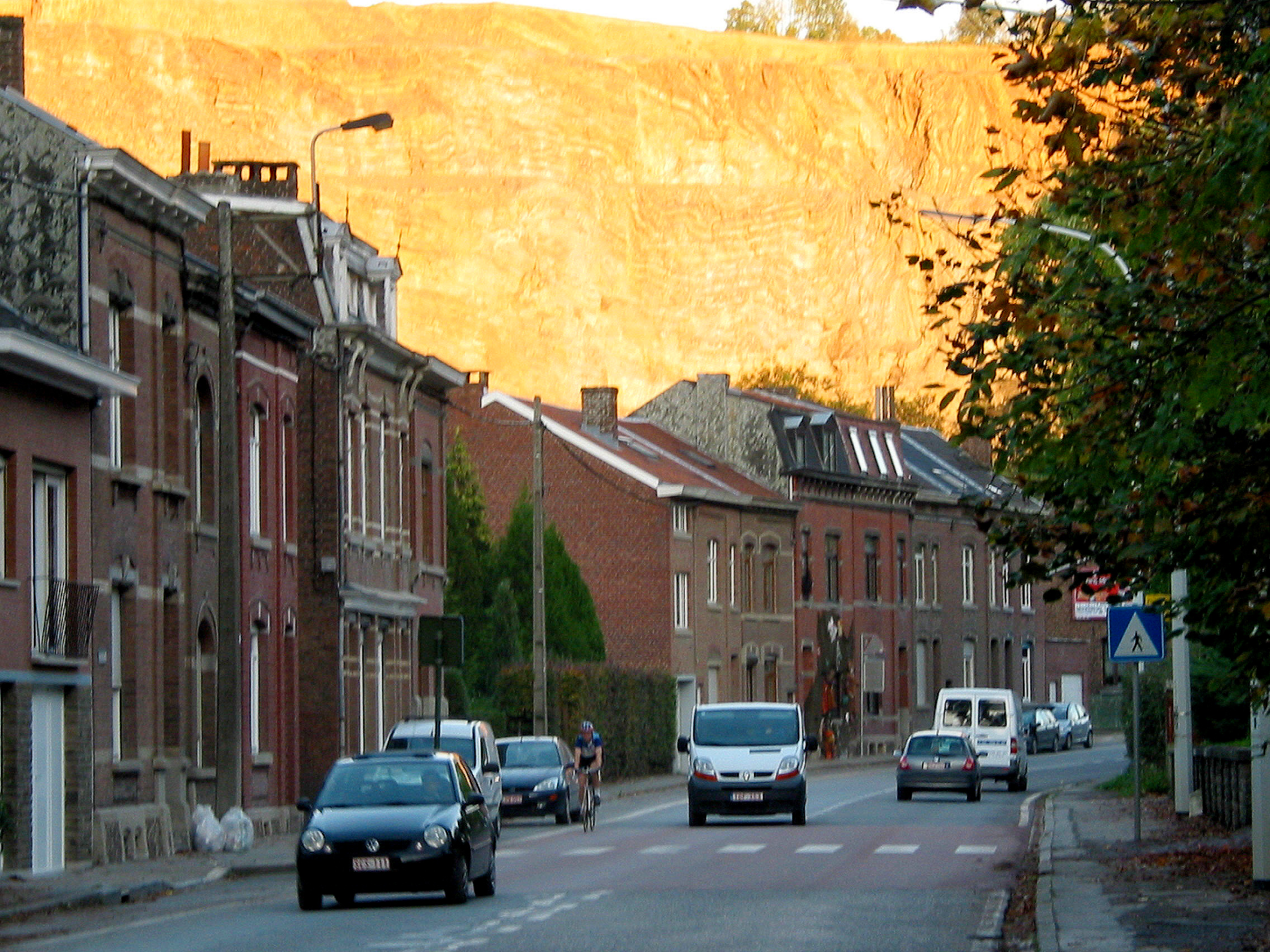
- Trooz: main street, with the cliffs behind illuminated by the setting sun

- Location of Trooz in Liège province
- Interactive map of Trooz
- Location in Belgium
- Coordinates: 50°34′N 05°41′E
- Country: Belgium
- Community: French Community
- Region: Wallonia
- Province: Liège
- Arrondissement: Liège

Government
  - Mayor: Fabien Beltran (PS)
  - Governing parties: PS, ÉcoVA

Area
  - Total: 24.26 km^{2} (9.37 sq mi)

Population (2018-01-01)
  - Total: 8,172
  - Density: 336.9/km^{2} (872.4/sq mi)
- Postal codes: 4870
- NIS code: 62122
- Area codes: 04
- Website: www.trooz.be

Trooz (French pronunciation: [tʁo]; Walloon: LiTrô) is a municipality of Wallonia located in the province of Liège, Belgium.

On 1 July 2012 Trooz had 8,432 registered inhabitants, of whom 4,199 were male and 4,233 female. The total area is 24.00 km^{2} which gives a population density of 351 inhabitants per km^{2}.

Trooz is situated on the Vesdre River, and is part of the GREOA (Groupement Régional Économique des vallées de l'Ourthe et de l'Amblève) regional grouping for economic purposes.

The municipality consists of the following districts: Forêt, Fraipont, Nessonvaux.

The town centre is the former hamlet of Trooz, in the district of Forêt, which gave its name to the municipality.

== Industrial heritage ==
The municipality includes several surrounding hamlets including Nessonvaux which is where, between 1904 and 1958, the Impéria company produced automobiles. The factory building survives. This building is one of three examples of test tracks on its roof. The other known roof test tracks are on the roof of the old Fiat factory in Turin, Italy, and Palacio Chrysler in Buenos Aires, which opened in 1928.

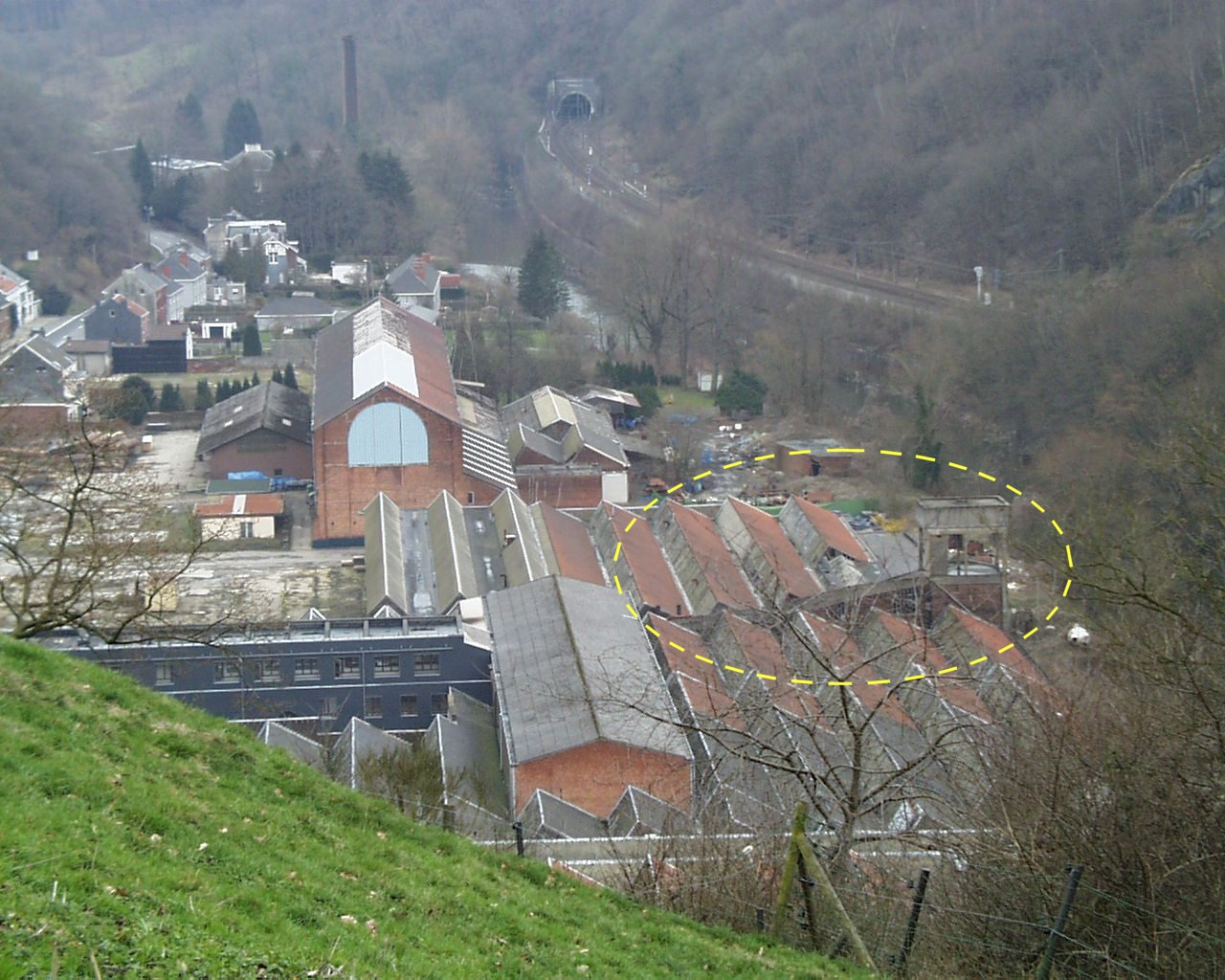
The Imperia car factory at Nessonvaux, photographed in 2004: part of the 1928 roof-top test track can be seen on the right side of the building and has been ringed in this picture.

== See also ==
- List of protected heritage sites in Trooz
