= Abadal =

Spanish automobile company

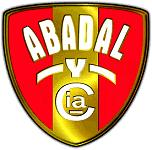
- Company type: Automobile manufacturer
- Industry: Automotive
- Founded: 1912
- Founder: Francisco Serramelera Abadal
- Defunct: 1923
- Headquarters: Barcelona, Spain
- Key people: Francisco Serramelera Abadal
- Products: Automobiles, Aero-engines

Abadal is a Spanish automobile company founded by the famous early 20th-century racing driver Don Francisco Serramelera Abadal, better known as Paco Abadal, in Barcelona in 1912.

== Don Francisco Serramelera Abadal ==
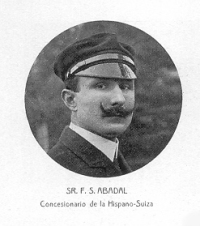
Francisco Abadal

Abadal was born on 27 July 1875 in Manresa and by the end of the century was a notable cyclist in Barcelona. His first motor vehicle was a 1.75-hp Clément tricycle which he raced. In 1902 Abadal began selling cars, motorbikes, cycles and accessories from the Auto-Garage Central in Barcelona.

He won a won a couple of hill climbs at Rabassade near Barcelona. The first in February 1904 was in a Clement 16 hp and the second in January 1905 was in a Hispano-Suiza T20. Also in 1905, he sold a Hispano-Suiza to King Alfonso XIII. His business grew and by 1908 he had branches in Calle Sepúlveda, Plaza Letamendi and Carretera de Sarriá. In In October 1912 Abadal married Mercedes Durán, daughter of the wealthy Catalan businessman and industrialist, Joaquim Durán Albert. In 1913 Hispano-Suiza cancelled its contract with Abadal so he decided to make his own vehicles under the make Abadal.

Soon after the inception of the Abadal line in 1913 Abadal visited the Belgian company Impéria. They negotiated an agreement whereby Impéria began building Abadals under license as Impéria-Abadal, With the outbreak of World War One and the invasion of Belgium by Germany this arrangement came to a temporary end.

In 1916 Abadal acquired the Buick agency, and Barcelona-built Abadals after that year had Buick power units and featured custom coachwork. These cars were called Abadal-Buick. In 1919 M A Van Roggen (formerly of Springuel) took over Impéria and built around 170 more Impéria-Abadals. Among the models produced were a 2992cc 16-valve four-cylinder OHC sports model and three prototype 5630 cc straight-eights.

Abadel died on 17 December 1939.

== Automobiles ==
=== Abadal 18HP, 23HP and 45HP ===
The first models were released simultaneously in 1913 under the direction of Francisco. "Abadal 18HP" and "Abadal 25HP" had a four-cylinder engine with a volume of 3.6 liters with a piston stroke of 180 millimeters and a cylinder diameter of 80 millimeters, as well as a four-speed manual gearbox. The five-seater open-top car was equipped with a suspension on semi-elliptical springs and traditional at that time drum brakes. The models were assembled on a spar frame and generally had technical similarities with other similar cars of that time, in particular with "Hispano-Suiza", but differed in design, for example, a wedge-shaped radiator. The maximum speed that the cars could reach was 112 kilometers per hour. A 1914 version of the 25HP is held at the Caramulo Museum in Portugal.

Abadal 45HP had all the same characteristics, but unlike the previous models, it stood out with a six-cylinder engine. These cars were more reliable than their predecessors.

=== Abadal 15.9HP ===
The model was first presented at the Paris Motor Show in 1913. Despite the classic appearance of the cars of that time, the "Abadal 15.9HP" was a new racing model of the company and differed from other sports models by its completely wooden body, which was designed and recreated by the French coachbuilder Jean Henri-Labourdette.

=== Abadal Buick 1923 ===
Buick engines had been used under licence in Abadal's since 1916. The first cooperative car of the two company's was released in 1923 under a joint name. The rear-wheel drive roadster was equipped with a six-cylinder engine with 60 horsepower, which contributed to acceleration of 140 kilometers per hour. The car was intended for track racing and weighed 1030 kilograms. One of these is held at Collecio D'automobils Salvador Claret near Barcelona.

There is a note of a Abadal Buick driven by José Rubio Márques winning a hillclimb at Reina near Malaga. This was followed by Pascual Sogas winning a hillclimb at Ordal near Barcelona on 29 December 1918 and again at Perdeces near Madrid on 7 June 1919. These are likely Buick engined Abadal's as the joint name did not appear till later. A Abadal-Buick driven by Leon Derny won a hillclimb at Porta-Coeli near Valencia on 23 June 1923.

=== Impéria-Abadal ===
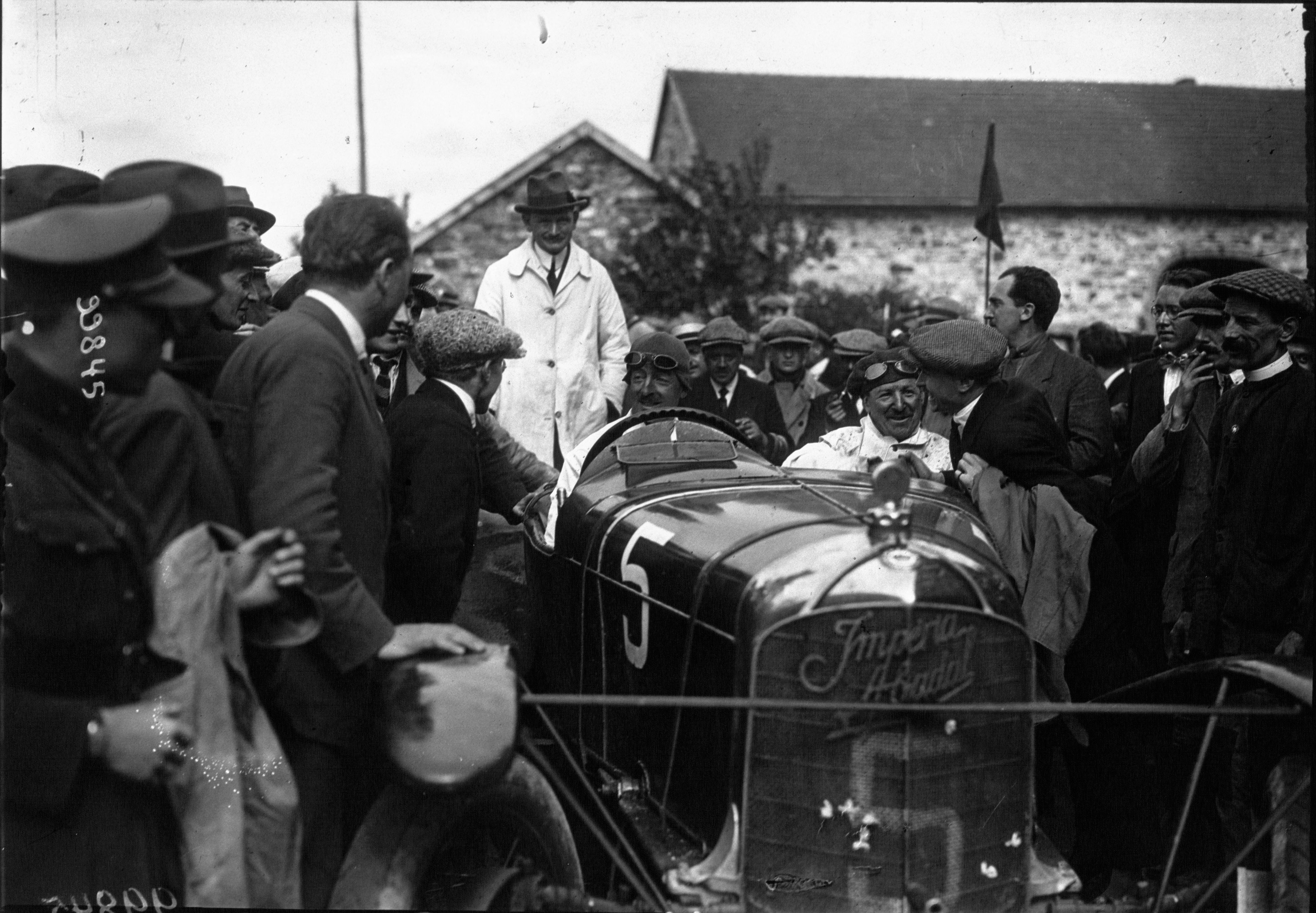
1922 Spa-Francorchamps winner

Another racing car rolled off the assembly line in 1921 under another joint name, "Abadal Imperial". This was the last joint project, developed in the year the partnership agreement expired. The model turned out to be the fastest version of all those previously released in alliance with "Impéria". It had an 8-cylinder engine with a total volume of 5.6 liters and was capable of accelerating to a maximum speed of 145 kilometers per hour. On 12 August 1922 this car won the 40 lap (about 603 km) Le Grand Prix pour voitures de tourisme at Spa-Francorchamps. It was driven by Baron Raymond de Tornaco and Barthélémy.

=== Abadal Continental 1930 ===
The last car of this brand was a prototype of a luxury sedan with a 3.5-liter engine from the German company Continental AG, on which Francisco had placed great hopes, but they were not destined to come true, because nothing followed beyond the idea and the initial sample.

== Demise ==
The company ceased automobile production in 1923. Abadal became an agent of General Motors in Spain. General Motors' plans in 1930 related to a prototype named the Abadal Continental never materialised.

== Gallery ==
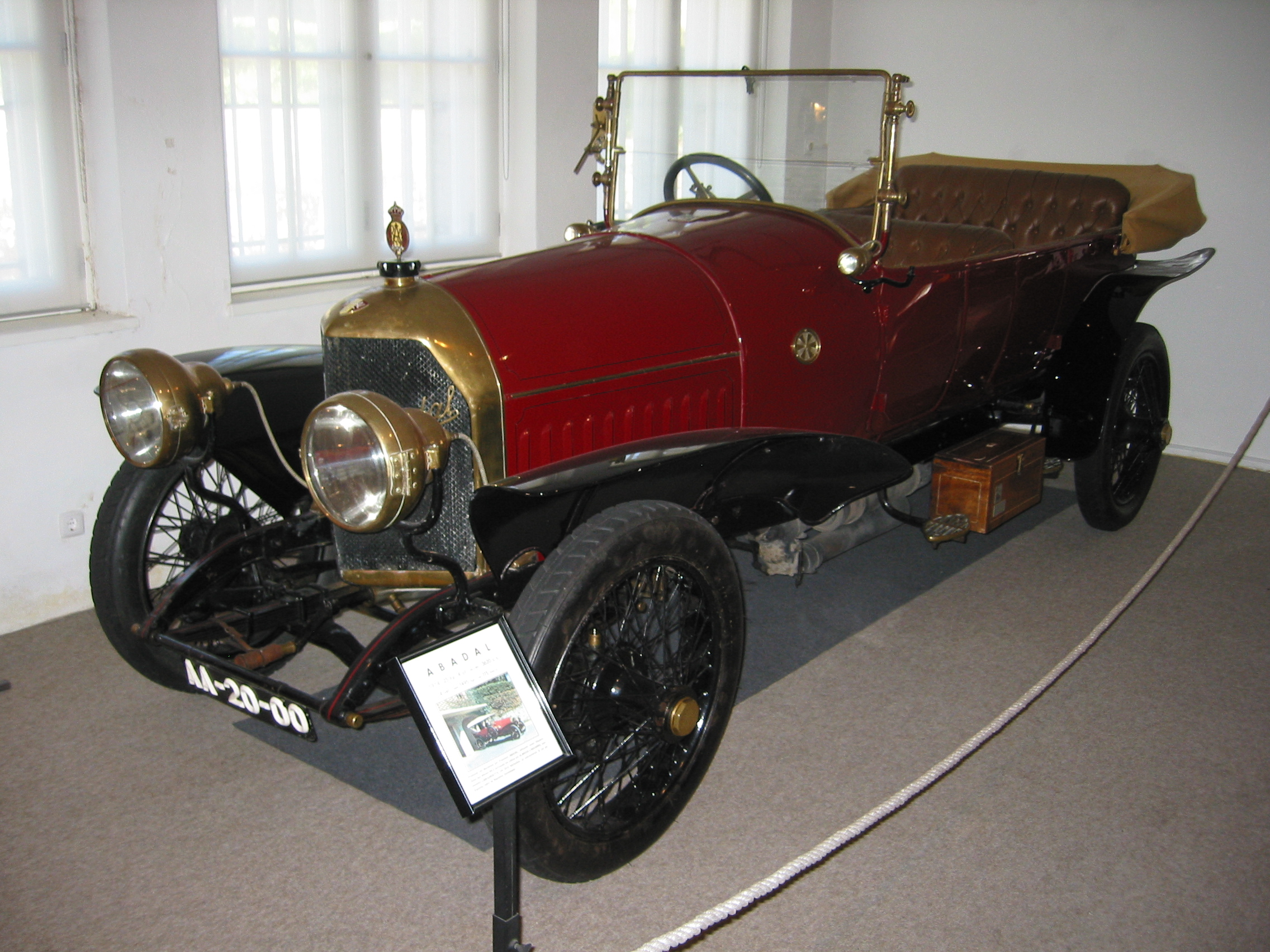
Abadal 25 HP 1914

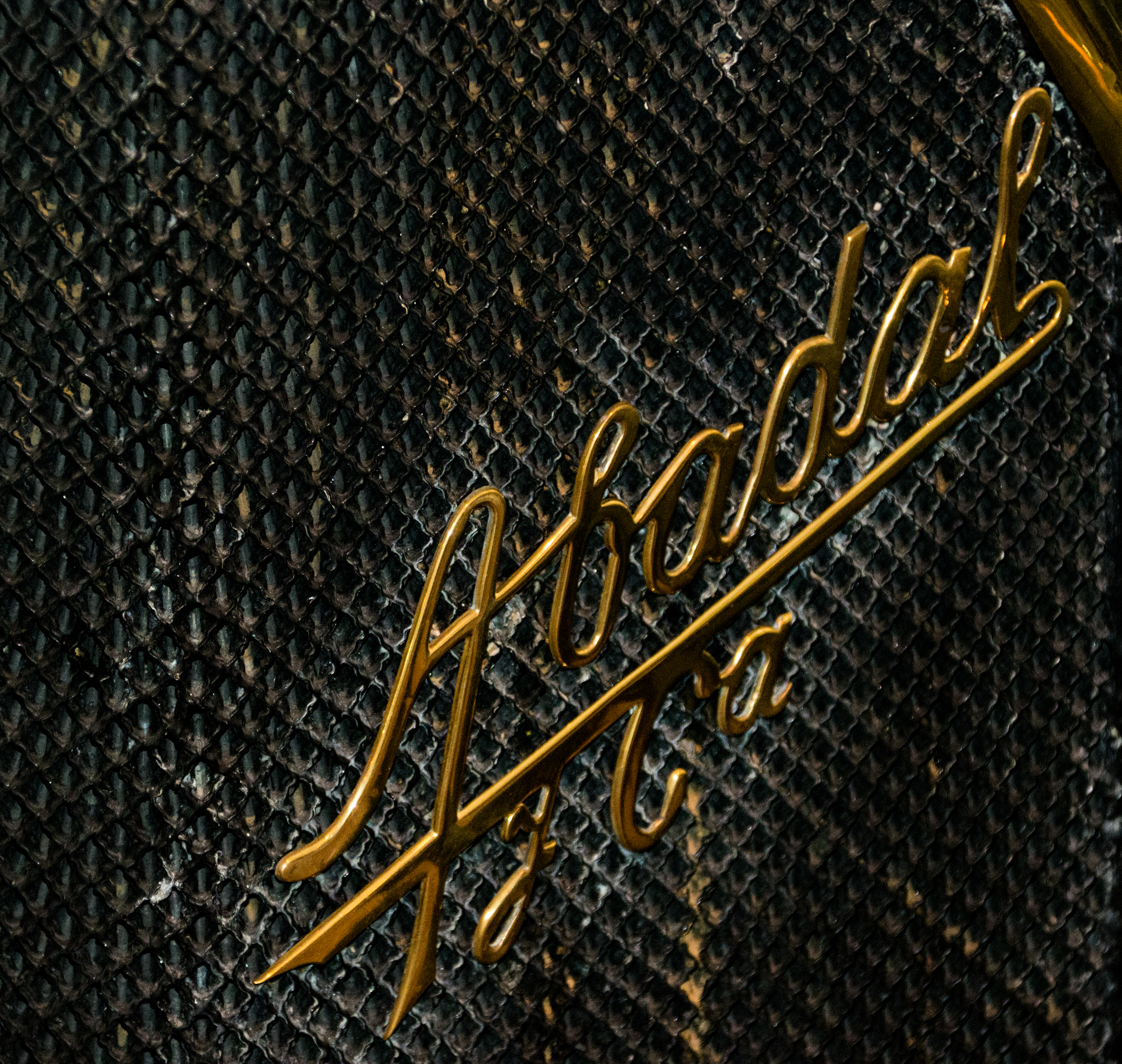
Abadal (grille)

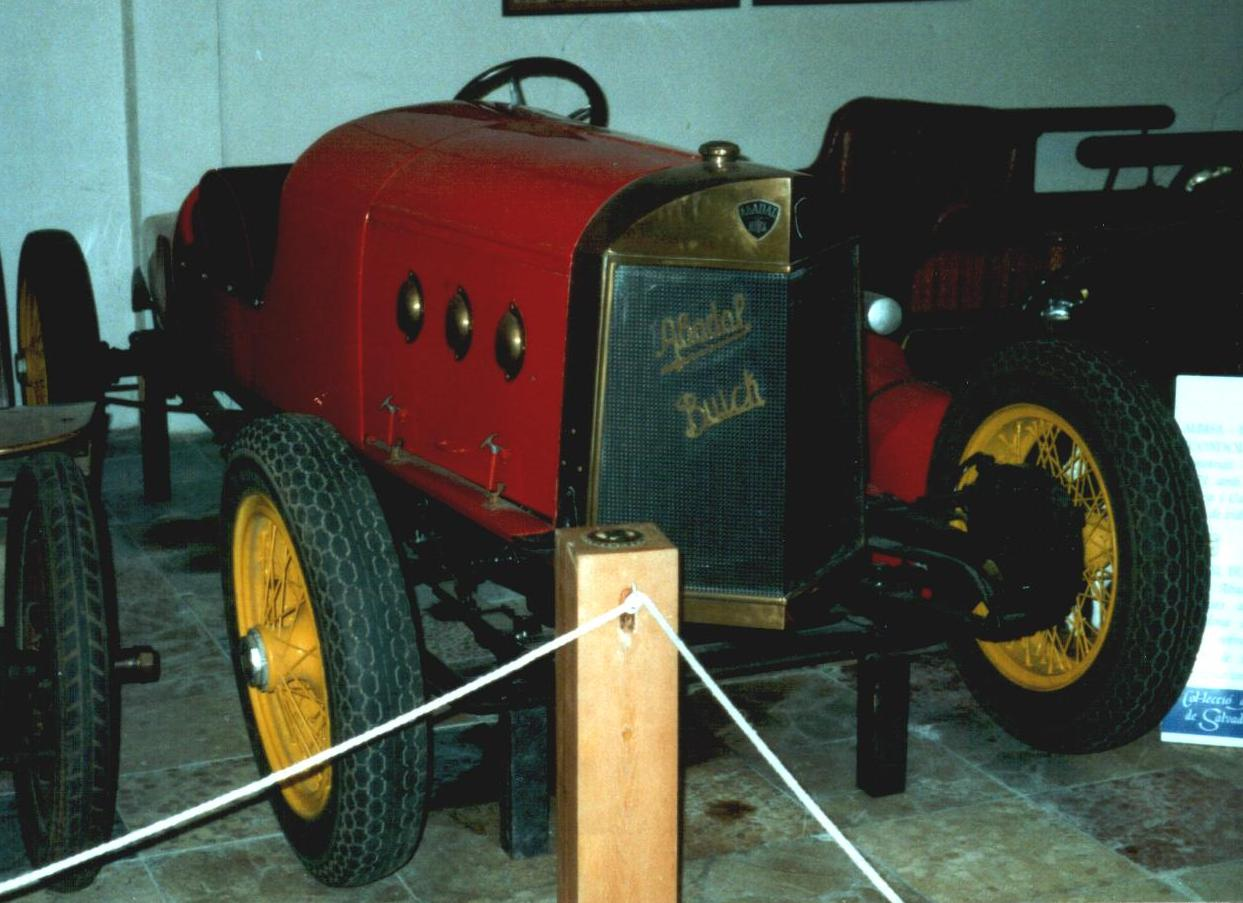
Abadal-Buick 1923

== Abadal Y-12 aero-engine ==
Abadal also produced the Abadal Y-12 aero-engine, a multiple bank in-line engine with twelve cylinders in three banks of four arranged in a Y. It was produced during World War One as an experimental aircraft engine. It was rated at 350 hp.

== Postage stamps ==
An Abadal featured on a 1977 Spanish postage stamp and a 1984 postage stamp from Nicaragua.
