= Sébastienne Guyot =

French engineer (1896–1941)

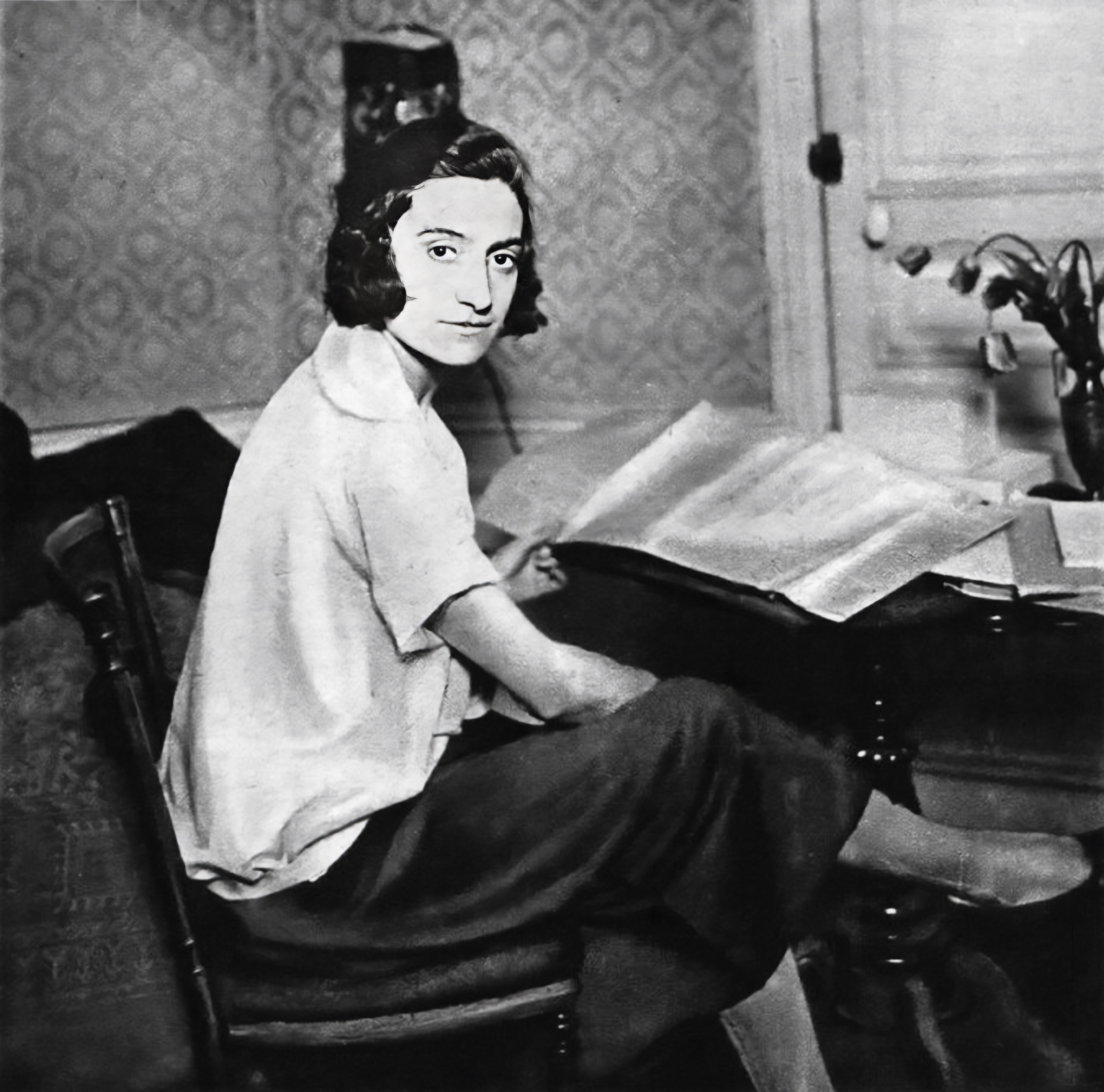
- Born: 26 April 1896; Pont-l'Abbé, Finistère, France
- Died: 21 August 1941 (aged 45); Paris, Île-de-France, France
- Education: École Centrale Paris
- Engineering career
- Discipline: Aeronautics

Sébastienne Marie Henriette Guyot (English: /ɡiːˈjoʊ/ ghee-YOH, French: [sebastjɛn ɡɥijo]; 26 April 1896 – 21 August 1941) was a French engineer who specialised in aerodynamic flying. She worked on the designs for aircraft and helicoptors and she was credited on several patents. A top athlete, she participated in the 1928 Summer Olympics in Amsterdam in the 800 meters and was French Cross Country Champion in 1928. Arrested by the Nazis when returning from an attempt to rescue her brother from a prison camp in 1940, she died in 1941 in Paris as a result of her imprisonment. It is planned to add her name to the Eiffel Tower.

== Early life ==
Sébastienne Marie Henriette Guyot was born 26 April 1896 at Pont-‘l’Abbé in Finistère, Brittany. Her father worked as a mounted policeman, ultimately being promoted to the role of Adjutant-Chef. She had one elder brother George (1894-1982) who became a pilot in the First World War and decorated with the Légion d’Honneur in 1917. Her two younger brothers were Roger (1901- 1980) and René (1903–1977).

== Education ==
In the spring of 1917, Sébastienne Guyot was working as a teacher. Turning twenty-one meant she was now legally an adult and able to make her own decisions, financial or otherwise. She gave up teaching and in October 1917 enrolled at the Lycée Jules Ferry in Paris, which ran classes to help women to prepare for the 1918 competition for entry into Central School of Paris, which had just permitted women to join their classes (as long as they sat in the front row). She came fifty-seventh out of 425 successful candidates passing the examination to enter the Central School of Paris. She chose to study mechanics, which included electrical engineering. By the end of the first year only 262 engineering students remained, with only 243 actually graduating in 1921. She ranked 45th of 243 graduates.

== Career in engineering ==
After graduation, Guyot moved into working in aviation. She may have been inspired by her older brother George’s experiences during the First World War, when he fought first as an aviation observer, got shot down and later trained and flew as a pilot, earning the Légion d’Honneur.

Guyot initially worked in two small companies, the "Ateliers de construction de l'Ouest" and then at the "Établissements Lumière" company from c.1922 through to 1928. The Lumiere aeroplane company was set up by Louis de Monge, a Belgian engineer living in Paris, to design aircraft. Guyot worked on the company's small twin-engine aircraft, launched in 1924, although much of the company's work was to undertake aeronautical research projects for the French government.

In 1929 Guyot moved to work as an aeronautical engineer at the "Hydravions Lioré & Olivier", a much larger company, which designed and manufactured seaplanes and military aircraft, including the LeO 45. She remained there until 1935, working on fuselages and hulls of several seaplanes, and in collaboration with designers, Paul Asantchéef and André Violleau, who thought highly of her.

In 1932, Guyot learnt to fly and bought a second-hand light plane, a Farman 231 with lowered wings, two-seater tandem roadster, Renault 95 horsepower engine, maximum speed around 186 km / h12. It was registered number F-AJZN and had a decal of two dogs on its side.

Around 1932 Guyot started working on the engineering of rotary blades for rotor craft. A 1933 record of a helicopter named "Loth-Guyot" survives in the Air Section of the Historical Defence Service at Vincennes. Between 1932 and 1939, Guyot took out six patents in conjunction with engineer and entrepreneur William Arthur Loth (1888-1957), concerned with improving the lift of the rotator blades. One involved the stabilisation of rotating lifting systems, another a swivelling screw propeller.

In 1936, the Arsenal de l'Aéronautique (usually called the Arsenal), a national military aircraft manufacturer, was established by the French Government at Villacoublay. In the dossier compiled by her brothers in 1947, making the case for her Resistance Medal, Sébastienne Guyot was described as "Head of the Helicopter Service at the Arsenal de l'Aéronautique", although details of her role there remain sketchy. The Arsenal was moved to Toulouse during the Second World War. It was dissolved in the 1950s and its pre-war records have disappeared.

== Sport ==
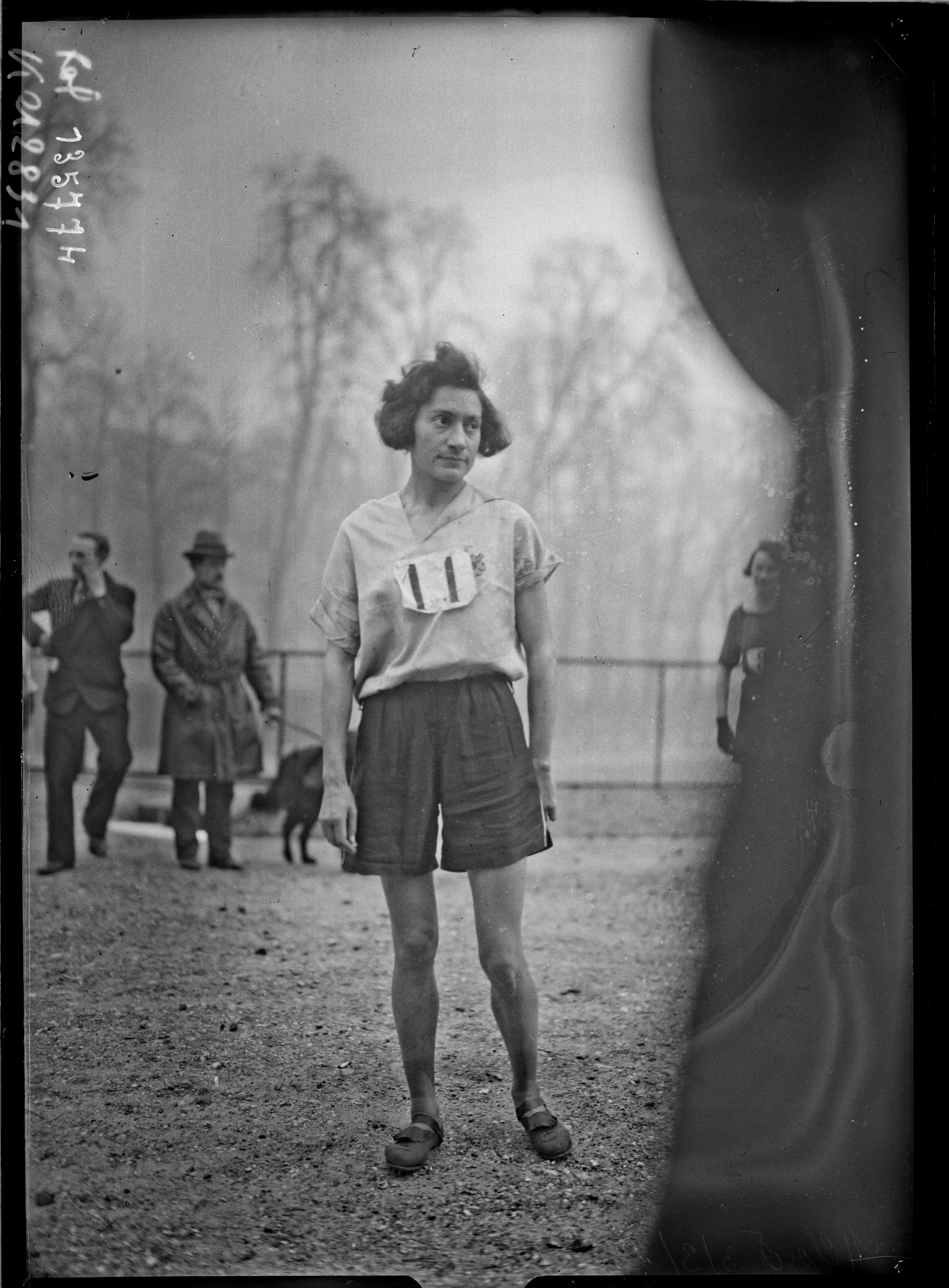
Sébastienne Guyot, winner of the French women's cross-country championship on 3 March 1929 in Saint-Cloud.

As well as her engineering and aeronautical career, Sébastienne Guyot was also a successful long-distance runner. In January 1927 she joined the Académie at the Val d´Or stadium, one of the few sports clubs which promoted women's sport in France at the time. She was French champion of female cross country running in 1928, and was selected to run the 800 metres at the 1928 Olympic Games in Amsterdam, continuing to compete until 1932.

== Attempt to rescue brother ==
On 7 July 1940, Sébastienne Guyot learnt that her younger brother René had become a prisoner of war earlier that month. He was held at the Mulsanne camp and Guyot decided to try to rescue him, leaving Toulouse on 9 July.

She somehow crossed the German army's lines without discovery, arriving at Mulsanne on 15 July and managed to get in touch with her brother. René explained that he had been appointed the "commandant du camp" the representative of all the other prisoners in dealing with the Wehrmacht, and felt that he could not abandon his men as his escape could endanger them. Guyot had to agree with the logic of his argument and left to return to Toulouse. She was discovered by German troops and found to be in possession of a map with instructions for evading them as well as a compass (her family think she travelled in her Renault car). She was arrested on 19 July 1940, tried in a court martial on 5 August and sentenced to six months in jail.

Despite the prison staff being French and visits from a chaplain, Guyot fell ill in prison and did not receive proper treatment. When her brother George arrived to pick her up at the end of her sentence in January 1941, he learned that she had just been hospitalised as an emergency. He discovered her in a skeletal state in the hospital, with gangrenous frostbitten hands. George rushed her to Paris where a surgeon saved her hand, but the disease progressed and she died in great pain at the Broussais Hospital on 22 August 1941.

== Honours and awards ==
Sébastienne Guyot received the Médaille de la Résistance posthumously in March 1947. Her three brothers survived the war.

Guyot is the only woman whose name is on the war memorial of the Ecole Centrale. Since 2010, an annual scholarship in her name has been awarded to five young Ecole Centrale students to fully fund their studies at the School.

In 2015, one of the eight streets in the new university area of Moulon in Gif-sur-Yvette, was named after Sébastienne Guyot. The area will accommodate CentraleSupélec in 2017, following the merger of Centrale Paris and Supélec.

In 2026, was announced as one of 72 historical women in STEM whose names have been proposed to be added to the 72 men already celebrated on the Eiffel Tower. The plan was conceived by a student and tour guide named Bernard Rigaud and it was announced by the Mayor of Paris, Anne Hidalgo following the recommendations of a committee led by Isabelle Vauglin of Femmes et Sciences and Jean-François Martins, representing the operating company which runs the Eiffel Tower.
