= List of protected heritage sites in Trooz =

This table shows an overview of the protected heritage sites in the Walloon town Trooz. This list is part of Belgium's national heritage.

Object	Year/architect	Town/section	Address	Coordinates	Number^{?}	Image
The square of the village Forêt ^{(nl)} ^{(fr)}		Trooz		50.583886°N 5.699443°E	62122-CLT-0001-01 Info	
Church of Sainte-Catherine ^{(nl)} ^{(fr)}		Trooz		50.584228°N 5.700637°E	62122-CLT-0002-01 Info	Kerk ('Sainte-Catherine')
Area of special value ("Site des Fonds de Forêt ') ^{(nl)} ^{(fr)}		Trooz		50.590943°N 5.692879°E	62122-CLT-0003-01 Info	
Monument-crypt to commemorate victims of the resistance of the tragedy of Forêt-Trooz, town square and the ensemble of the monument and its surroundings ^{(nl)} ^{(fr)}		Trooz		50.583691°N 5.698357°E	62122-CLT-0004-01 Info	Monument-crypte ter nagedachtenis aan slachtoffers van de weerstand van de tragedie van Forêt-Trooz, dorpsplein en het ensemble van het monument en diens omgeving
The castle of Fenderie ^{(nl)} ^{(fr)}		Trooz	rue de la Fenderie, n°5 (M) et ensemble formé par ce castel et les terrains environnants (S)	50.571228°N 5.690963°E	62122-CLT-0005-01 Info	Het kasteel van Fenderie
Organs of the church of Saint-Gilles ^{(nl)} ^{(fr)}		Trooz		50.565575°N 5.724285°E	62122-CLT-0006-01 Info	
Nature of Massouheid ^{(nl)} ^{(fr)}		Trooz		50.575483°N 5.705039°E	62122-CLT-0007-02 Info	
Nature of Massouheid (extension) ^{(nl)} ^{(fr)}		Trooz		50.573584°N 5.704499°E	62122-CLT-0008-01 Info	
Facades, roofs and windows of the main building and the adjacent outbuilding with oldest remnants in the Fonds-de-Forêt ^{(nl)} ^{(fr)}		Trooz		50.592178°N 5.696122°E	62122-CLT-0010-01 Info	
The front bounded on the left by the semi-hexagonal tower of the castle and bounded on the right by a part of the facade below the entrance of the old factory Imperia ^{(nl)} ^{(fr)}		Trooz		50.574020°N 5.744194°E	62122-CLT-0011-01 Info	
Area of special value ("Le site des Fonds de Forêt ') ^{(nl)} ^{(fr)}		Trooz		50.590943°N 5.692879°E	62122-PEX-0001-01 Info	

== See also ==
- List of protected heritage sites in Liège (province)
- Trooz
