= Lumière-de Monge racer =

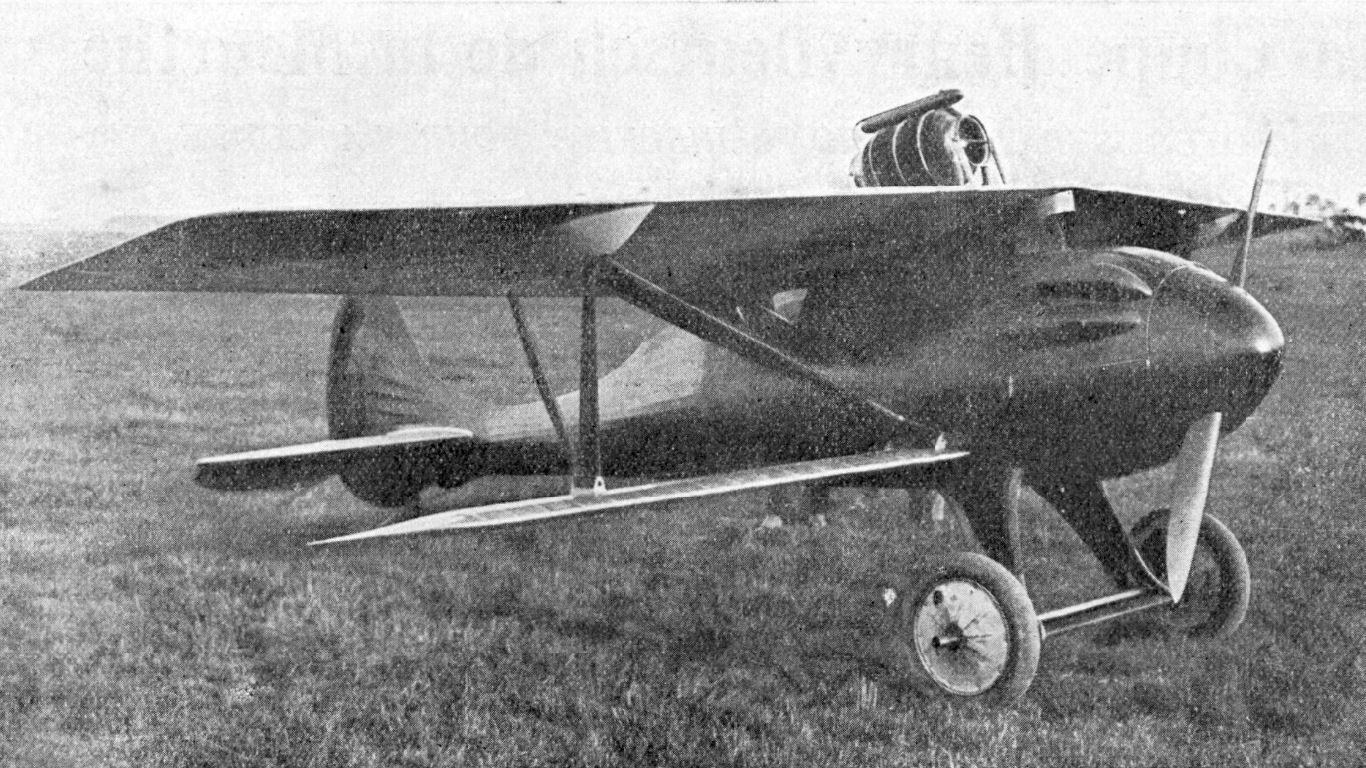

General information
- Type: Racing aircraft
- National origin: France
- Manufacturer: S.A. Establissements Lumière
- Designer: Louis de Monge
- Number built: 1

History
- First flight: Summer 1921

The Lumière-de Monge racer (Note: It may have had the type number 5-1 but this does not, unlike the later 5-2, appear in the contemporary journals) was built specifically to compete in the 1921 Coupe Deutsch de la Meurthe and was flown at Etampes on 1 October 1921. In addition to its speed, it was unusual in being a high wing monoplane which could be rapidly converted into a biplane by adding a smaller lower wing. It crashed before the race, killing its pilot, and was unable to participate.

== Design and development ==
The structure of the racer throughout was wooden and its covering fabric.

The one-piece permanent, upper wing, trapezoidal in plan and with an aspect ratio of only 4.3, was built around two spars, the forward one in two parts parallel to the leading edges and the one-piece rear spar perpendicular to the aircraft's axis. It was mounted on the top of the fuselage on a long, streamlined pylon that included the pilot's cabin and was braced to the lower fuselage by a single strut on each side, made from layers of mahogany in the same way as the aircraft propellers de Monge was well known for. Ailerons were fitted only on the upper wing. The two-piece, rectangular plan lower wing, with three-quarters of the span of the upper wing but only one-third of its area, was mounted on the lower fuselage and braced to the upper wing by V-struts.

The racer was powered by a 220 kW (300 hp), liquid cooled V-8 Hispano-Suiza 8Fb engine, closely cowled and with a cylindrical Lamblin radiator mounted axially above the upper wing. Its fuel tank was in the fuselage, which was built in a novel way based on an internal tapered tube with clamping frames around it. Externally the fuselage was rounded in section and slimmed down markedly to the tail. There was an opening in the tube for the pilot's cabin in the rear part of the wing pylon, near mid-chord. It was accessed via a side door and had large side windows giving good lateral vision, even with the lower wing in place, and there was a transparent panel in the upper wing over the cockpit but the pylon ahead limited the forward view.

The Monge had a conventional tail, with a generous tailplane low on the fuselage carrying notched elevators and with an overall roughly oval plan. Its fin was integrated into the fuselage and carried a D-shaped rudder that reached downwards to match an extension of the lower fuselage under the tailplane that carried a rubber-damped tailskid. The fixed main landing gear had mainwheels on a single axle, with shock absorbers within a streamlined housing that joined the landing legs. The legs were also enclosed in fairings.

The exact date of the de Monge's first flight is not known but was before mid-July 1921, when Bernard de Romanet flew it at Orly. Development flights continued into September without reported problems, but on 23 September de Romanet flew it as a monoplane, with the lower wings removed, for the first time. He took-off safely but when he opened the throttle and the aircraft accelerated, the fabric covering of one wing peeled away. De Romanet died in the crash.

Some of the racer's characteristics, the fuselage in particular, are seen in the Buscaylet-de Monge 5/2, a 1922 fighter designed after Monge's move to Buscaylet et Cie. However, the fighter's parasol wing was a completely new design, all-metal, swept and with a higher aspect ratio.

== Specifications ==
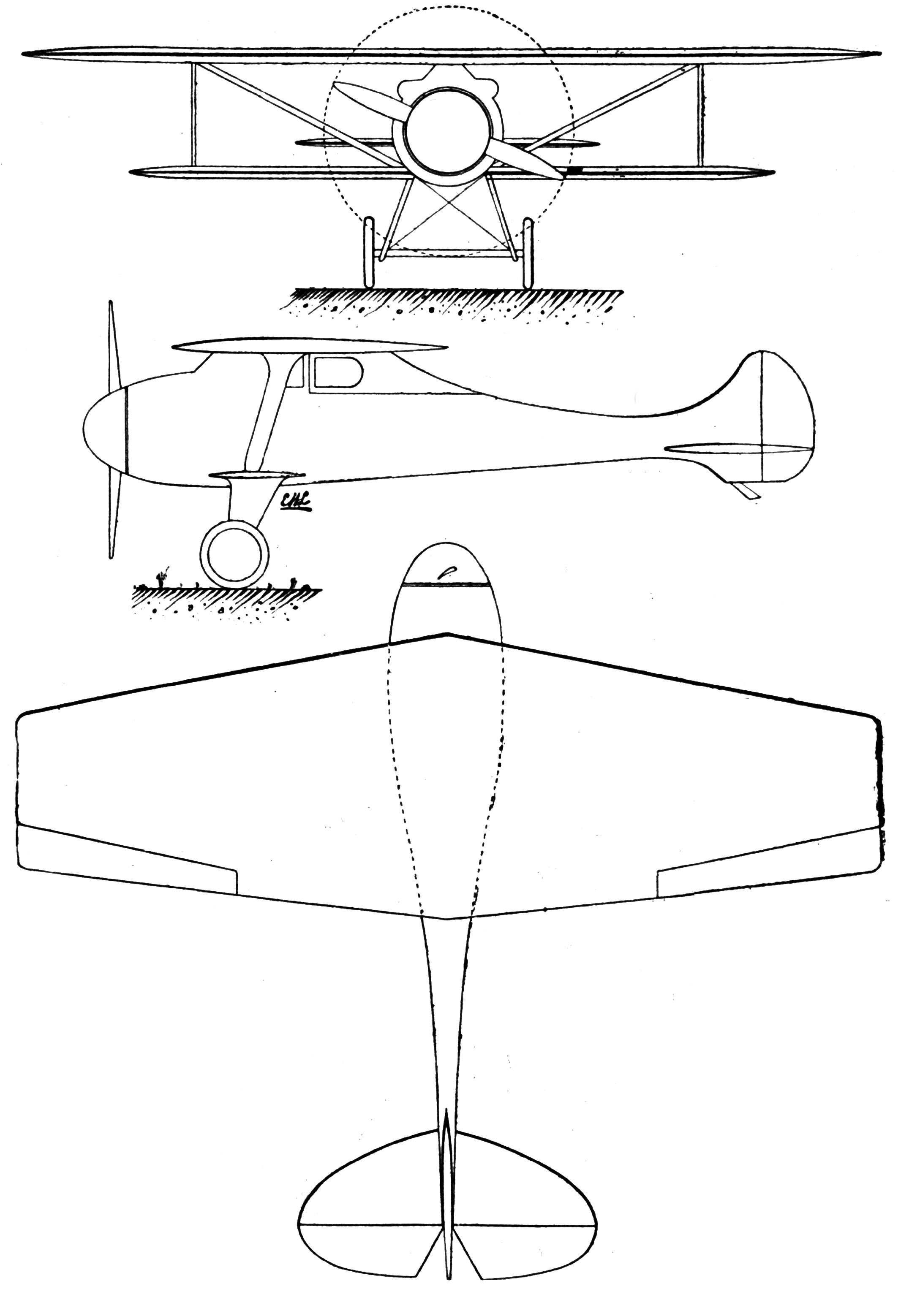
Lumière-de Monge racer 3-view drawing from Les Ailes August 25, 1921

Data from Les Ailes, August 1921 except where noted.

General characteristics

- Crew: One
- Length: 7 m (23 ft 0 in)
- Upper wingspan: 8 m (26 ft 3 in)
- Lower wingspan: 6 m (19 ft 8 in) optional
- Height: 2.75 m (9 ft 0 in)
- Wing area: 15 m^{2} (160 sq ft) upper wing, optional lower 5 m^{2} (54 sq ft)
- Gross weight: 950 kg (2,094 lb)
- Powerplant: 1 × Hispano-Suiza 8Fb liquid cooled V-8, 220 kW (300 hp)
- Propellers: 2-bladed
- Maximum speed: 330 km/h (210 mph, 180 kn) estimated
