= Green Propulsion =

Green Propulsion is a Belgian research and development centre specialising in battery electric and hybrid vehicles. Founded in 2001, it had gone bankrupt in 2015 and was refunded by investors to become Green Propulsion Engineering (GPE) as of 2016.

== Vehicles ==
In the early 2000s, the prototyping business focused on busses and multi purpose vehicles for municipalities. A collaboration with Lamborghini opened perspectives for further developments in the premium hybrid sport cars market. A daughter company was launched in 2008, with the rebirth of the Belgian brand Impéria Automobiles.

=== Imperia GP ===
Imperia GP was a neo retro hybrid electric vehicle concept planned to be sold from 2011. The motorisation of the Imperia GP roadster relies on the so-called PowerHybrid propulsion technology (both thermic and battery powered electric propulsion). Preorders were open in 2008, but many design changes and re-prototyping, with concomitant rescheduling were announced between 2009 and 2015, when the company's illiquidity was brought to the commercial court. A takeover proposal of luxury cars converter Carat-Duchatelet was refused by the court which declared the bankruptcy. Surprisingly, the website of the brand, with many details about the evolution of the project, is still online in 2023.

=== Other vehicles ===
Other Green Propulsion vehicles includes:

- Electric kart, with Li-ion batteries.
- Electric motorcycle, with a 100 km range and 70 km/h (43 mph) top speed.
- Plug-in Hybrid Volkswagen Lupo, with Na NiCl batteries and 40 km in only-electric mode.
- Hybrid Renault Kangoo, with Li-ion batteries and more than 40 km in only-electric mode.
- Series Hybrid urban bus for max 18 passengers, Ni-Cd batteries and over 25 km in only-electric mode or unlimited range in hybrid mode (diesel).
- Electric upgrade of historic touristic tramways used at the grottes de Han.
- Hybrid Marine propulsors.
