= Buscaylet-de Monge 7-4 =

de Monge 7-4

General information
- Type: Experimental aircraft
- National origin: France
- Manufacturer: Ateliers Buscaylet père et fils, Bobin et Louis de Monge
- Designer: Louis de Monge
- Number built: 1

History
- First flight: summer 1923

The Buscaylet-de Monge 7-4 was a small, French, twin-boom aircraft without a fuselage, built in the mid-1920s to explore the characteristics of a proposed larger machine.

== Design and development ==
The de Monge 7-4 was designed and built to provide aerodynamic information on the three times larger proposed de Monge 72. Each was a twin boom monoplane with a conventional empennage but no fuselage. Instead, the wing between the booms was extended in chord and greatly thickened to provide depth for cockpits. The smaller aircraft had two engines, mounted just within the booms; the de Monge 72 was to have had a third engine on the central wing leading edge. It was designed by Belgian pioneer Louis de Monge.

Both the inner and outer sections of the wing were built around two wooden box spars and wooden ribs. The final ribs of the centre-section extended rearwards to the tail as the booms and the outer panels were bolted to them. An open single cockpit for pilot and passenger in side-by-side seats was positioned between the spars. In plan the centre-section was rectangular, about 2.0 m (6 ft 7 in) in span, 3.0 m (9 ft 10 in) in chord (more than half the overall length of the aircraft) and was 660 mm (2 ft 2 in) thick. The outer panels were braced to the lower centre-section outer edge on each side with two steel tube struts. In plan the outer panels were strongly tapering trapezoids, carrying ailerons along the entire trailing edge.

The de Monge 7-4 was powered by two 26 kW (35 hp) Anzani air-cooled 3-cylinder radial engines on a girder across the leading edge of the centre-section. Since they were both just within the centre-section span, they were less than 2.0 m (6 ft 7 in) apart and the propeller disks slightly overlapped; to avoid damage both engines were slightly canted to starboard.

The top of the rear ends of the booms were bridged by a near-rectangular plan horizontal tail with a full span elevator. This had a pair of cut-outs for the deep rudders, mounted on near triangular fins; there was another, rudderless fin mounted at the centre of the tailplane.

The de Monge 7-4 had a conventional fixed, split-axle, tailskid undercarriage. The axles were hinged from a V-strut, mounted on the centreline and braced with transverse wires, with their outer ends mounted on near-vertical rubber shock absorbing struts and hinged, trailing struts, both to the lower centre-section outer edge. Each boom carried a small tailskid.

The exact date of the first flight of the de Monge 7-4 is not known but it was present for the 1923 Coupe de Zenith, piloted by one Brusseaux. However, for unrecorded reasons it failed to depart on the first stage. Its early trials had been flown by Alexis Maneyrol, who was flying a Peyret aircraft at this competition.

It competed in the same contest in 1924 but once again was forced to retire. By this time more powerful Anzani 34 kW (45 hp) engines had been fitted.

== Specifications ==
Data from Flight December 1923 pp.44-5

General characteristics

- Crew: One
- Capacity: One passenger / flight test observer
- Length: 5.325 m (17 ft 6 in)
- Wingspan: 10.7 m (35 ft 1 in)
- Height: 1.65 m (5 ft 5 in)
- Wing area: 23.33 m^{2} (251.1 sq ft)
- Empty weight: 400 kg (882 lb)
- Gross weight: 650 kg (1,433 lb)
- Powerplant: 2 × Anzani air-cooled 3-cylinder radial, 26 kW (35 hp) each
- Propellers: 2-bladed Lumière

Performance

- Maximum speed: 145 km/h (90 mph, 78 kn) approximately
