= Bugatti Model 100 =

French air racer of the late 1930s

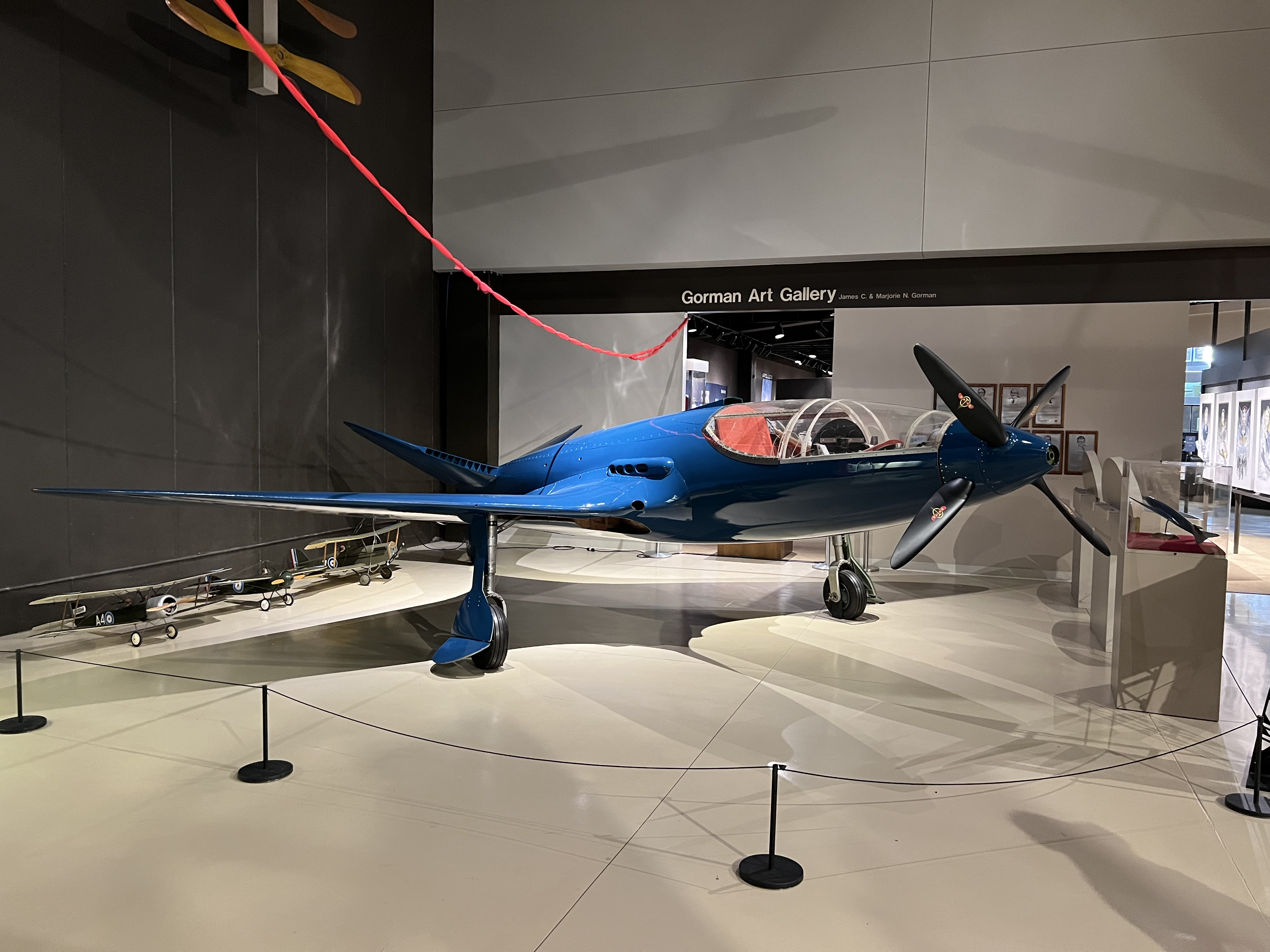
- Bugatti Model 100 on display

General information
- Type: Unlimited racer
- National origin: France
- Manufacturer: Bugatti
- Designer: Louis de Monge
- Status: On display
- Number built: 1

History
- Manufactured: 1939

The Bugatti Model 100 is a purpose-built air racer designed to compete in the 1939 Deutsch de la Meurthe Cup Race. The aircraft was not completed by the September 1939 deadline and was put in storage prior to the German invasion of France.

== Development ==
Ettore Bugatti started work in 1938 to design a racer to compete in the Deutsch de la Meurthe Cup Race, using engines sold in his automotive line for co-marketing.

Bugatti's chief engineer was Louis de Monge, with whom Bugatti had worked before. Bugatti was also approached by the government of France to use the technology of the racing aircraft to develop a fighter variant for mass production. The aircraft was the source of five modern patents, including the inline engines, v-tail mixer controls and the automatic flap system.

== Design ==
The Model 100 had an unusual inboard mounted twin engine arrangement driving forward-mounted contra-rotating propellers through driveshafts.

The aircraft also featured a 120-degree v-tail arrangement and retractable landing gear. The construction was mostly of wood, with sandwiched layers of balsa and hardwoods, including tulipwood stringers covered with doped fabric.

== Operational history ==
With the outbreak of World War II and the imminent fall of Paris, Bugatti had the aircraft disassembled and hidden on his estate. Bugatti died in 1947, having never resumed work on it.

The aircraft remained in storage throughout World War II. It was sold several times and its twin Bugatti 50P engines were removed for automotive restorations. In 1971 a restoration effort was started. The aircraft was stored by the National Museum of the United States Air Force, then transferred to the EAA Aviation Museum collection where restoration was completed and it remains there on static display.

== Blue Dream reproduction aircraft ==
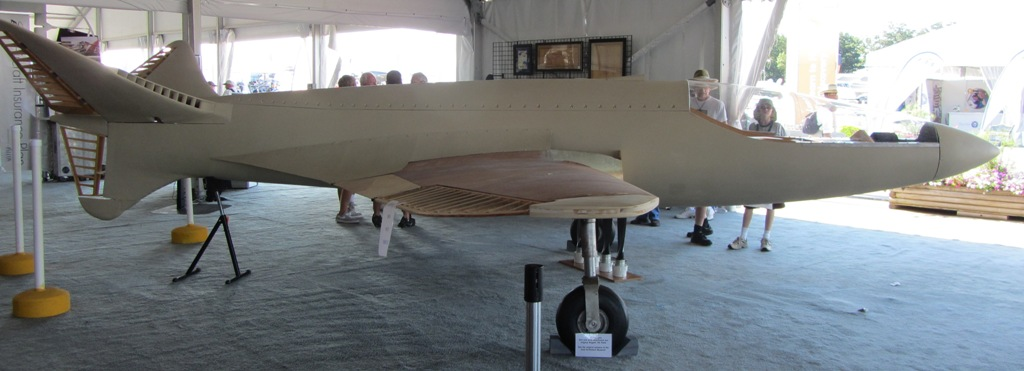
Bugatti 100P replication progress in 2011

A full scale flying reproduction was constructed by a team of enthusiasts, most notably Scotty Wilson and John Lawson. Modern materials were used within reason, allowing for cost and safety. The use of magnesium, named in the original design to save weight, was rejected due to its flammability and cost. A wood composite, DuraKore, was used in place of the original tulipwood and glued in place with modern epoxy. The doped fabric was replaced with fiberglass.

The partially completed aircraft was displayed at the EAA AirVenture Oshkosh convention in 2011.

On 4 July 2015 the reproduction aircraft, named Blue Dream taxied under the power of its two Suzuki Hayabusa engines at Tulsa, Oklahoma.

On 19 August 2015 the team announced that they had completed their first successful test flight of the replica aircraft. Its handling characteristics were "as expected" by the team and it achieved a maximum altitude of 100 feet (30 meters) AGL at a maximum speed of 110 knots (200 km/h). On landing though the plane "floated much more than anticipated" and landed significantly farther down the runway than intended. Because of this the wheel brakes needed to be applied to keep from overrunning the end of the runway. Subsequently, the right brake failed, sending the aircraft into the muddy soil adjacent to the runway, tipping it up in its nose and generating a prop and spinner strike. In October it made a successful flight.

=== Crash of reproduction aircraft ===
On 6 August 2016 the reproduction aircraft crashed during its third test flight near Clinton-Sherman Air Force Base in Oklahoma, killing the pilot, Scotty Wilson.

Less than a minute into its third and final flight, the aircraft banked sharply to the left and dove into a nearby field. The plane impacted nose-first, instantly killing the pilot. The aircraft was destroyed in the crash and subsequent fire.

It had been planned to retire the aircraft after this flight to an unnamed museum in the United Kingdom. The crash has been investigated by the National Transportation Safety Board. The structural engineer from the project, Frank van Dalen, wrote an independent investigation report about the 100P crash.

The gearbox from the crashed reproduction aircraft is on display at the Musée de la Chartreuse, Molsheim.

== Variants ==
The Bugatti Model 110P was a proposed militarized pursuit version of the model 100 racer. It never materialised.

== Specifications (Bugatti Model 100) ==
Data from EAA.

General characteristics

- Capacity: 1
- Length: 7.75 m (25 ft 5 in)
- Wingspan: 8.2 m (27 ft)
- Height: 2.24 m (7 ft 4 in)
- Wing area: 20.69 m^{2} (222.7 sq ft)
- Empty weight: 1,400 kg (3,086 lb)
- Powerplant: 2 × Bugatti Type 50P Straight 8 4.9L, 340 kW (450 hp) each
- Propellers: 2-bladed Ratier counter-rotating

Performance

- Wing loading: 68 kg/m^{2} (13.9 lb/sq ft)

== Bibliography ==
- Roux, Robert J. (January 1970). "Bugatti 100P & 110P". Le Album de Fanatique de l'Aviation (in French) (7): 5–7. ISSN 0757-4169.
