= Springuel =

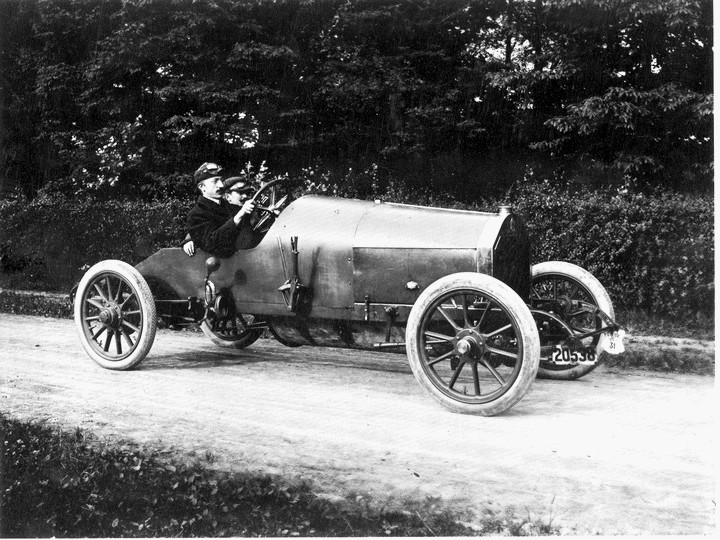
A Springuel automobile

The Springuel was a Belgian automobile manufactured from 1907 until 1912 by the Société anonyme des automobiles Springuel. It was a 24 hp pair-cast four, built in small numbers.

The company was founded by Jules Springuel-Wilmotte in Huy and merged with Impéria Automobiles in 1912. The 1911 12 hp won the Grand Prix of Belgium in 1913.
