= Nessonvaux =

Location in Wallonia, Belgium

Coordinates: 50.575°N 5.735°E

Nessonvaux is a section of the municipality of Trooz in Wallonia, located in the province of Liège, Belgium.

== Overview ==
Nessonvaux is located in the Pays de Herve on the banks of the River Vesdre, where the Ri de Vaux flows into it. Until the Belgian municipal reform of 1977, Nessonvaux was an independent municipality.

Nessonvaux has a well-known industrial past, through the manufacture of rifle barrels from Damascene steel, and through the Imperia car factory, which had one of only three test tracks for cars in the world on the roofs of the factory. A part of the track (French piste) can still be seen, namely the high arch near the water tower.
