= SOCATA TBM =

Family of single engine turboprop aircraft

TBM
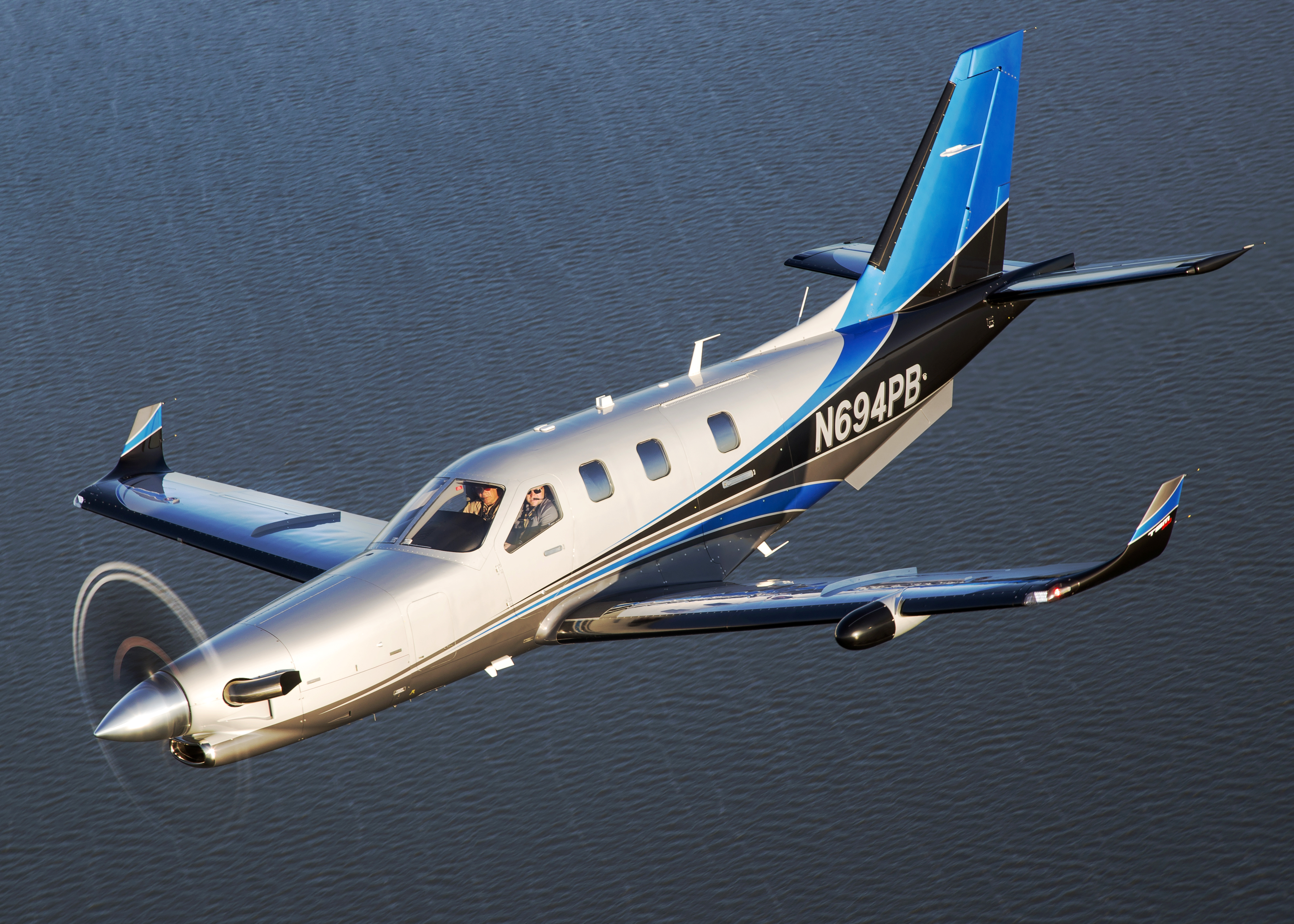
- TBM 900

General information
- Type: Executive transport and civil utility
- National origin: France
- Manufacturer: SOCATA; Daher
- Status: In production
- Primary users: French Army French Air and Space Force
- Number built: 1000 (as of October 2020)

History
- Manufactured: 1988–present
- Introduction date: 1990
- First flight: 14 July 1988
- Developed from: Mooney 301

The SOCATA TBM (now Daher TBM) is a family of high-performance single-engine turboprop business and utility light aircraft manufactured by Daher. It was originally collaboratively developed between the American Mooney Airplane Company and French light aircraft manufacturer SOCATA.

The design of the TBM family originates from the Mooney 301, a comparatively low-powered and smaller prototype Mooney developed in the early 1980s. Following Mooney's acquisition by French owners, Mooney and SOCATA started a joint venture for the purpose of developing and manufacturing a new, enlarged turboprop design, which was designated as the TBM 700. Emphasis was placed upon the design's speed, altitude, and reliability. Upon its entry onto the market in 1990, it was the first high-performance single-engine passenger/cargo aircraft to enter production.

Shortly after launch, the TBM 700 was a market success, which led to the production of multiple variants and improved models, often incorporating more powerful engines and new avionics. The TBM 850 is the production name assigned to the TBM 700N, an improved version of the aircraft powered by a single Pratt & Whitney PT6A-66D. In March 2014, an aerodynamically refined version of the TBM 700N, marketed as the TBM 900, was made available.

== Development ==
=== Origins ===
In the early 1980s, the Mooney Airplane Company of Kerrville, Texas designed a six-seat pressurized light aircraft, powered by a single 360 hp (268 kW) piston engine, which they designated the Mooney 301. On 7 April 1983, the prototype 301 conducted its maiden flight.

During 1985, the Mooney Aircraft Company was acquired by new French owners, who promptly took an interest in the further development of the fledgling 301. Coinciding with the company's acquisition, French light aircraft manufacturer SOCATA, who had identified a vacant market position for a purpose-built optimised single-engine aircraft capable of fast personal transport and light cargo duties, identified the piston-powered 301 as a potential starting point to satisfy this niche.

Accordingly, talks soon commenced between Mooney and SOCATA on the subject of producing a turboprop-powered derivative of the 301. The product that emerged from these discussions was a new design, referred to as the TBM 700, which was considerably heavier than the original 301 while provisioned with more than twice the available power. The prefix of the designation, TBM, originated from the initials "TB", which stands for Tarbes, the French city in which SOCATA is located, while the "M" stands for Mooney. At the time of its conception, while several aviation companies had studied or were otherwise considering the development of such an aircraft, the envisioned TBM 700 was the first high-performance single-engine passenger/cargo aircraft to enter production. From the onset, key performance criteria were established for the design, demanding a high level of reliability while also being capable of an unequalled speed/altitude combination amongst the TBM 700 other single-engined peers.

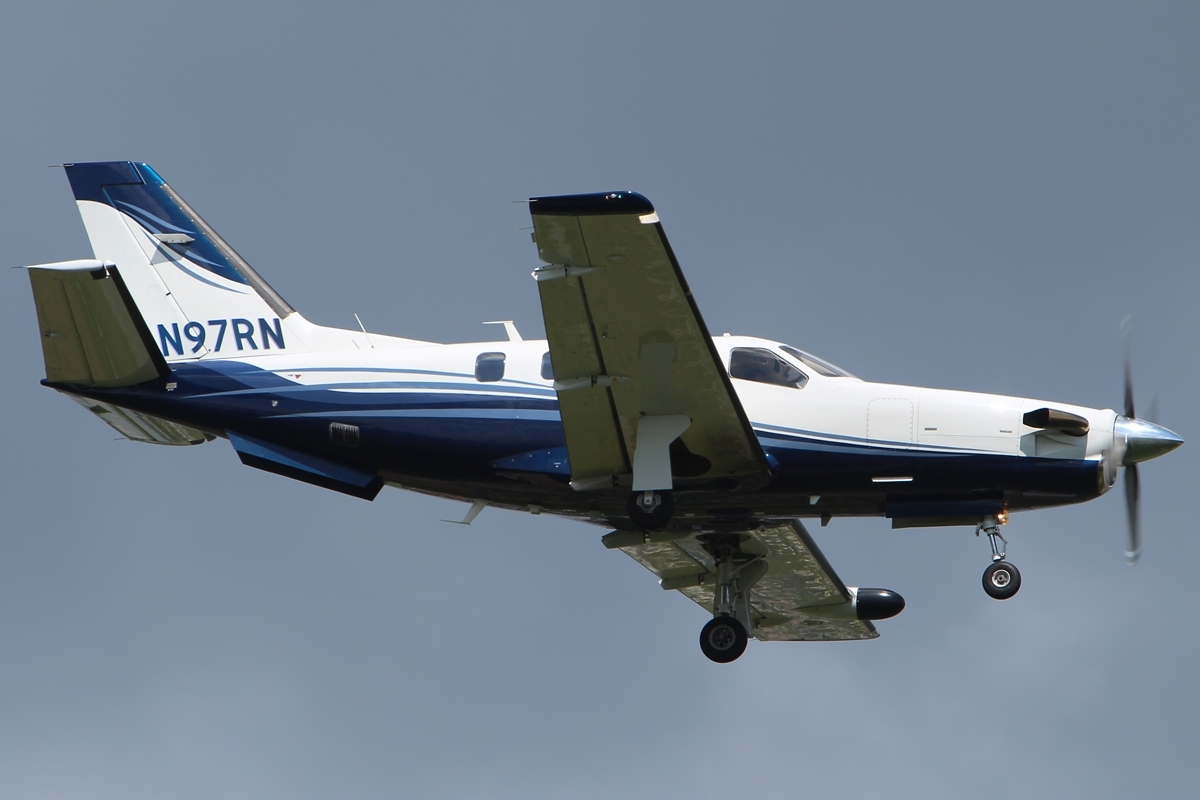
A TBM 700

Consequently, during June 1987, a joint venture, named TBM International, was established with the aim of completing development of the TBM 700 design and to perform the manufacture of the new aircraft; the ownership of the joint venture was divided between Mooney and SOCATA's parent company Aérospatiale. A pair of separate production lines for the TBM 700 were planned — one located at Mooney's facility in Kerrville, Texas, which was intended to cater to the American market, and the other based at SOCATA's factory in Tarbes, which was set to produce aircraft for customers throughout the rest of the world. However, during the late 1980s and early 1990s, Mooney was afflicted by persistent fiscal shortfalls; consequently, in May 1991, Mooney chose to withdraw from participation in the joint venture, leaving SOCATA as the primary company involved in the program.

On 14 July 1988, the first TBM 700 prototype conducted its maiden flight. Flight testing proved that virtually all of the established goals of the design had been achieved, leading to quick progress towards production. On 31 January 1990, type certification was received from French authorities; it was followed by the awarding of U.S. Federal Aviation Administration (FAA) certification on 28 August 1990. During early 1990, the first delivery of a TBM 700 occurred; the first production batch of 50 aircraft were sold out almost instantly. Early feedback received from operators and pilots was typically positive regarding the capabilities of the new aircraft, with the speed and generous power margins, amongst other attributes, specially noted.

=== Further development ===
According to the aerospace publication Flying, while the TBM 700 had rapidly proved popular on the market and a good aircraft on its own merits, the services and support facilities SOCATA provided for the aircraft were an initial point of weakness. Early on, customers were often faced with lengthy delays in acquiring spare parts and other services; negative feedback on the after sales support for the TBM 700 has been attributed as the cause of a downturn in sales during the 1990s. SOCATA, recognising the critical importance of an effective support infrastructure, decided to invest heavily in improving worldwide support for the type; instead of being solely reliant upon third parties and partnership arrangements with other companies, the firm developed its own facilities. SOCATA opened its own service center in Florida, as well as establishing a network of distributors capable of both sales and services for the TBM 700. Consequently, during the late 1990s, sales of the type within the North American market rose dramatically.

Early on, the TBM 700 was available in several different configurations and models. The introduction of the TBM 700C2, which increased the maximum takeoff weight from 6,578 to 7,394 lb (2,984 to 3,354 kg), enabled operators to fly with both fully laden fuel tanks and maximum cabin occupancy instead of compromising between the two due to weight restrictions. The modifications made upon this model included the addition of a baggage compartment aft of the rear pressure bulkhead, the strengthening of the wing and landing gear, and seat crashworthiness certification for up to 20 G to accommodate for an elevated stall speed at higher weights. Around the same time, SOCATA decided to re-design the interior of the aircraft, including the fittings and finish, along with the adoption of a new integrated environmental control system, to improve passenger comfort levels.

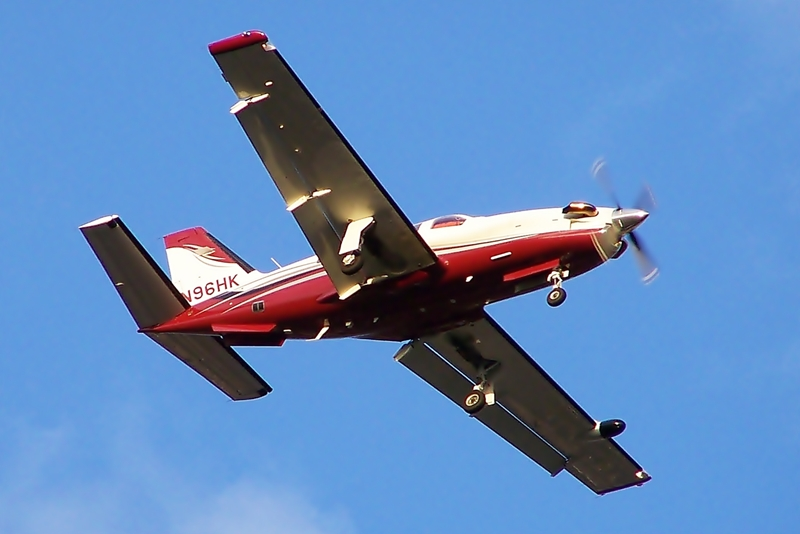
A TBM 850 with undercarriage lowered for landing

The TBM 850 is the production name for the TBM 700N, an improved version of the aircraft powered by a single Pratt & Whitney PT6A-66D engine, which is flat rated at 850 shp (634 kW). The TBM 850 is limited to 700 shp (522 kW) for takeoff and landing; however, during cruise flight, the engine power can be increased to 850 shp (634 kW); this extra power provides the aircraft with a higher cruising speed than the TBM 700 models, especially at high altitudes (due to the flat-rating). The outside appearance of the TBM 850 has remained similar to that of the standard TBM 700. The TBM 850 has a typical range of 1,520 nautical miles (2,820 km). Beginning with the 2008 model, the TBM 850 has been equipped with the Garmin G1000 integrated flight deck as standard equipment.

In 2014, an improved version of the aircraft, marketed as the TBM 900 was introduced, featuring 26 individual modifications, including the adoption of in-house-designed winglets, a redesigned air intake and the fitting of a five-blade Hartzell-built propeller, with the aim of delivering improved aerodynamics and performance. The adoption of a sharp strake, located forward and beneath the leading edge of the left wing, also provides for improved stall characteristics over the earlier TBM variants. According to aircraft publication Aviation Week, various subtle exterior changes were made for drag reduction purposes, including the addition of inner main landing gear doors, the re-contouring of the tail cone and of the engine nacelle.

In comparison with the TBM 850, the TBM 900 is around 14 kn (26 km/h) faster in cruise flight, uses less fuel, requires less runway length, climbs faster, and produces noticeably less interior and exterior noise. This is partially due to the elimination of the 700 shp (522 kW) limitation for takeoff present on previous TBM models; all 850 shp (634 kW) of the PT6A-66D engine is normally available. In combination with a more efficient air inlet, which boosted the available torque and ram recovery, and reshaped exhaust stacks, which increased thrust output, makes the plane faster. According to Aviation Week, due to its greater speed, the TBM 900 can more effectively compete against light jets. Aviation Week observed that it is faster on a 600 nmi (1,100 km) mission, and burns 26% less fuel than the Cessna Citation Mustang.

At the June 2018 Eurosatory, an ISR configuration with underwing hardpoints and electrical connections for sensors and aerial photography was offered for defense, security, medical evacuation and transport missions. Competing with heavier aircraft and MALE UAVs, it benefits from its short field performance and speed, offers six hours of surveillance and can be reconfigured for other duties. It was validated with a 110-pound (50-kg) camera and a multi-sensor optronics retractable turret, SAR/ground MTI radar, communication interception system, and secure transmission with a quick-change console for tactical situation monitoring.

In March 2019, Daher introduced the $4.13 million TBM 940 with autothrottle and automatic deicing, to be certified for the April AERO Friedrichshafen.

=== EcoPulse demonstrator ===
EcoPulse demonstrator with electric thrusters

At the June 2019 Paris Air Show, Daher, Airbus and Safran teamed up to develop the TBM-based EcoPulse demonstrator for a hybrid electric aircraft. The project is kick-started by the French Civil Aviation Research Council (CORAC) with support from the French DGAC. Safran will provide the distributed hybrid propulsion system: turbogenerator, electric power management system and electric motors and propellers. Airbus will install the batteries and optimize the aerodynamics, and Daher will install components and systems, and will be responsible for the flight testing and overall analysis.

With half of the €22 million ($25 million) demonstration funded by the DGAC, the maiden flight is scheduled for the summer of 2022 before a hypothetical 2025-30 certification. The aircraft's existing engine will be supplemented by six Safran electric motors on the wings fed by a 100 kW (130 hp) APU or batteries. Similar to the NASA X-57 Maxwell, the distributed propulsion reduces wingtip vortices and add low speed lift by blowing the wing, enabling a smaller, lower drag wing.

The high voltages required, over 500 volts, is a new challenge in aviation and special cables and protection were developed by Safran. After a year of testing, a follow-on commuter aircraft might be built by Daher. Airbus Defence and Space is developing the 230 by 75 by 20 cm (91 by 30 by 8 in) lithium-ion battery to be mounted on the fuselage underside, weighting 350 kg (770 lb) for a power of 350 kW (470 hp). By May 2022, Daher was planning a maiden flight by the end of the year, beginning a 100 flights test programme over 18 to 24 months. By May 2023, the demonstrator had flown 15 hours with the electric propellers feathered, while the hybrid-electric powertrain was to be flight tested after June 2023. On 29 November, it made a first electric flight for 1h 40min from Tarbes, with its six 50 kW (67 hp) electric motors powered by an Airbus 800-volt battery pack and a Safran turbogenerator.

== Design ==
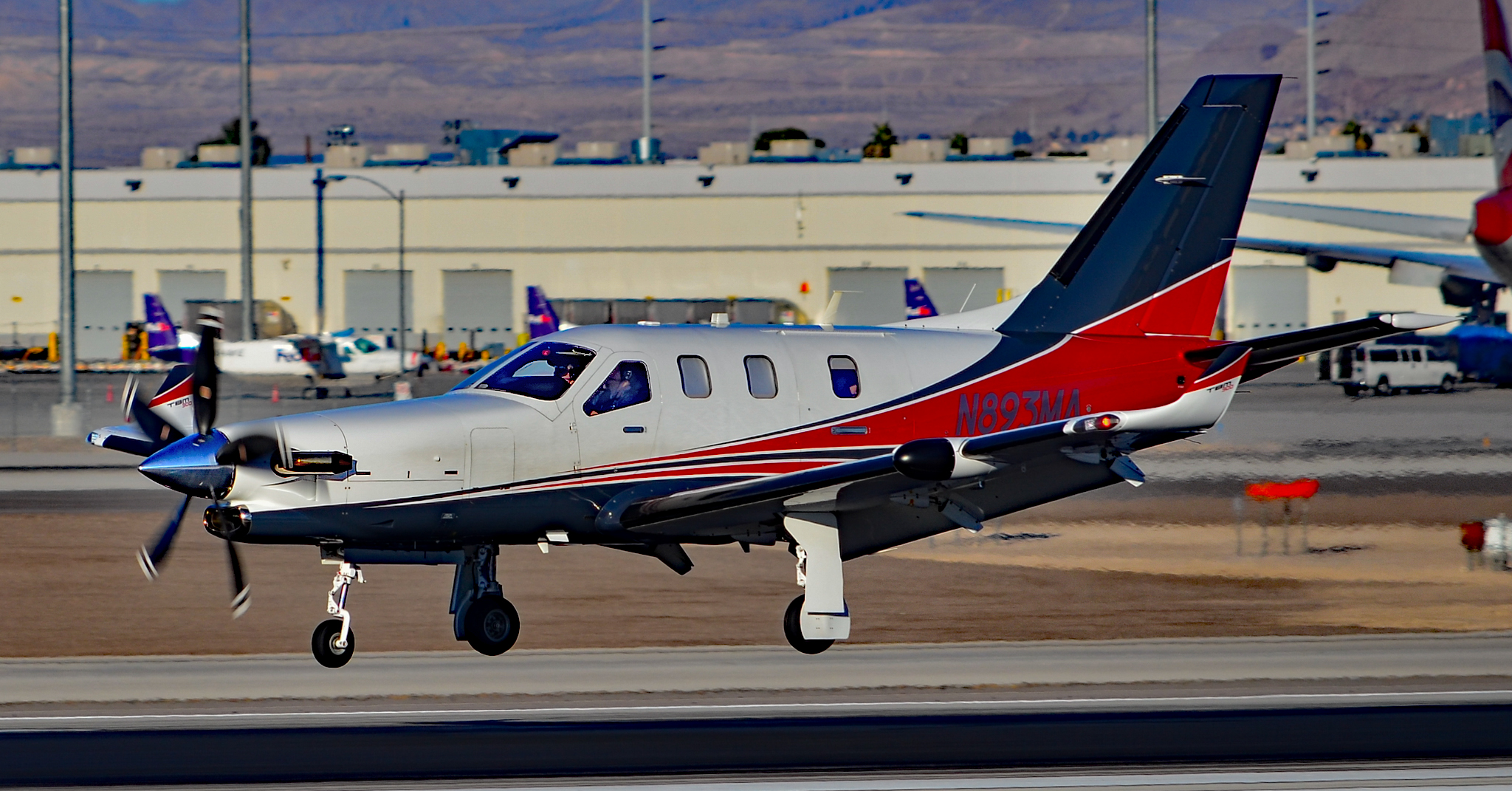
A TBM 900 landing, November 2015

The SOCATA TBM is a single-engined turboprop-powered low-wing monoplane, seating a maximum of six people. It is composed mainly of aluminium and steel construction, but with the tail surfaces built of Nomex honeycomb. The wing features a very effective Fowler flap, comprising 80 per cent of the trailing edge's span, for the purpose of lowering the aircraft's stall speed. The TBM 700 is outfitted with a retractable tricycle landing gear arrangement, newer models feature stronger main landing gear wheels and tougher tyres. The TBM 900 model features automatic torque limiting for “set and forget” power management, which is particularly useful during takeoff; according to Aviation Week, while this function does reduce the high workload associated with managing the PT6A engine, it is not as capable as a full FADEC arrangement.

The cockpit design of the TBM strives to be user-friendly and as uncomplicated to operate as possible. For pilot convenience, an automatic fuel selector automatically switches between fuel tanks periodically to effortlessly maintain fuel balance throughout flight; manual selection of fuel tanks is also possible, which remains overseen by a low fuel warning system. The ice protection system is as automated as possible, the windshield being electrically heated, the air inlet being kept warm by engine exhaust and the de-ice boots automatically cycling once activated. The electrically actuated flaps are monitored by a sophisticated split-flap protection system to prevent asymmetric deployment. An onboard air data computer calculates various values to support the pilot, such as the aircraft's true air speed, wind, and power advisory notices based upon current external temperature and altitude.

The Pratt & Whitney Canada PT6A-64 engine, providing up to 700 shp (522 kW). According to Flying Magazine, the PT6A-64 engine is "the secret to the TBM 700's performance. At sea level, the engine is capable of generating a maximum 1,583 shp (1,180 kW), which is intentionally limited to 700 shp (522 kW) on early TBM models; the limit allows the aircraft to maintain 700 shp (522 kW) up to 25,000 ft (7,620 m) on a typical day. Engine reliability and expected lifespan are also enhanced by the limitation. While the typical engine overhaul life is set as 3,000 flight hours between overhauls, on-condition servicing can also be performed due to various engine parameters being automatically recorded by the engine trend monitoring (ETM) system. Data from the ETM can be reviewed by the engine manufacturer to determine the level of wear and therefore the need for inspection or overhaul. The ETM, which is connected to the aircraft's air data computer, also provides information to enable easy power management by the pilot.

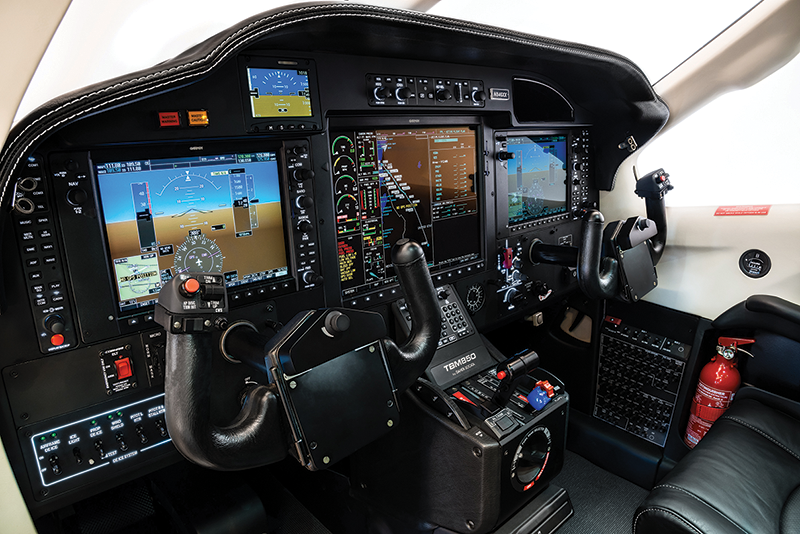
The cockpit of a TBM 850. Note the presence of the Garmin G1000 glass cockpit.

The cockpit of the TBM seats two person flight crew. According to Flying Magazine, even in the standard configuration, the cockpit is provided with a generous suite of avionics and equipment. It features an electronic flight instrument system (EFIS), traffic collision avoidance system (TCAS), terrain awareness and warning system (TAWS), weather radar, lightning detection, dual Garmin GNS 530 navigation/communication systems, Bose headsets, dual transponders, dual compasses, and full cockpit instrumentation for both positions. Pilots can enter the cockpit either from the main cabin or via a small pilot's door on the left hand side, forward of the wing; in a cargo configuration, the pilot's door eliminates the need to clamber over the cargo payload. The pilot's door is an optional extra, and is not installed upon all aircraft. From the TBM 700B onwards, an enlarged cabin entry door was introduced, which later became standard upon subsequent models.

The TBM 900 model features several ergonomic improvements within the cockpit, increasing both simplicity and automation. A new single power lever integrates the power, propeller and condition lever controls. Various switches and controls, such as some formerly present upon the overhead panel, have been eliminated. The electrical system is powered by a single main generator, which is supplemented by a belt-driven alternator. On the TBM 900, electrical load distribution changes enable the Garmin G1000 glass cockpit to power up in sync with the switch-on of the battery with little battery drain. The G1000 also has upgraded displays, including an ISA temperature deviation indication, integrated weather radar and MFD map, and automatic landing field elevation inputs to the pressurization controller.

In a passenger configuration, the pressurised cabin of the TBM is typically fitted with highly finished interiors, often featuring luxury materials such as high quality leathers and wood veneers. The seats are certified for their crashworthiness for up to 20 G. From the TBM 850 onwards, a combined air conditioner/environmental control system was integrated into the cabin, being simpler and requiring less adjustment than the prior arrangement. At cruise altitudes, the cabin of the TBM 900 is noticeably quieter than its predecessors; the reduction is due to the adoption of a new five-bladed propeller and the reduction of vibration levels via greater isolation between the engine and the airframe. Later built models are equipped with winglets, which were developed by SOCATA primarily to reduce drag when flown at high angles of attack, such as during takeoffs, as well as to enhance the aircraft's aesthetics. The TBM 900 saw the adoption of a new five-bladed propeller, specially optimised by Hartzell based upon airflow simulations conducted of the TBM's forward section. According to SOCATA, Hartzell's selection over a similar advanced counterpart from MT-Propeller was made due to the former raising the cruise speed by around 3 to 5 kn (5.5 to 9 km/h).

== Variants ==
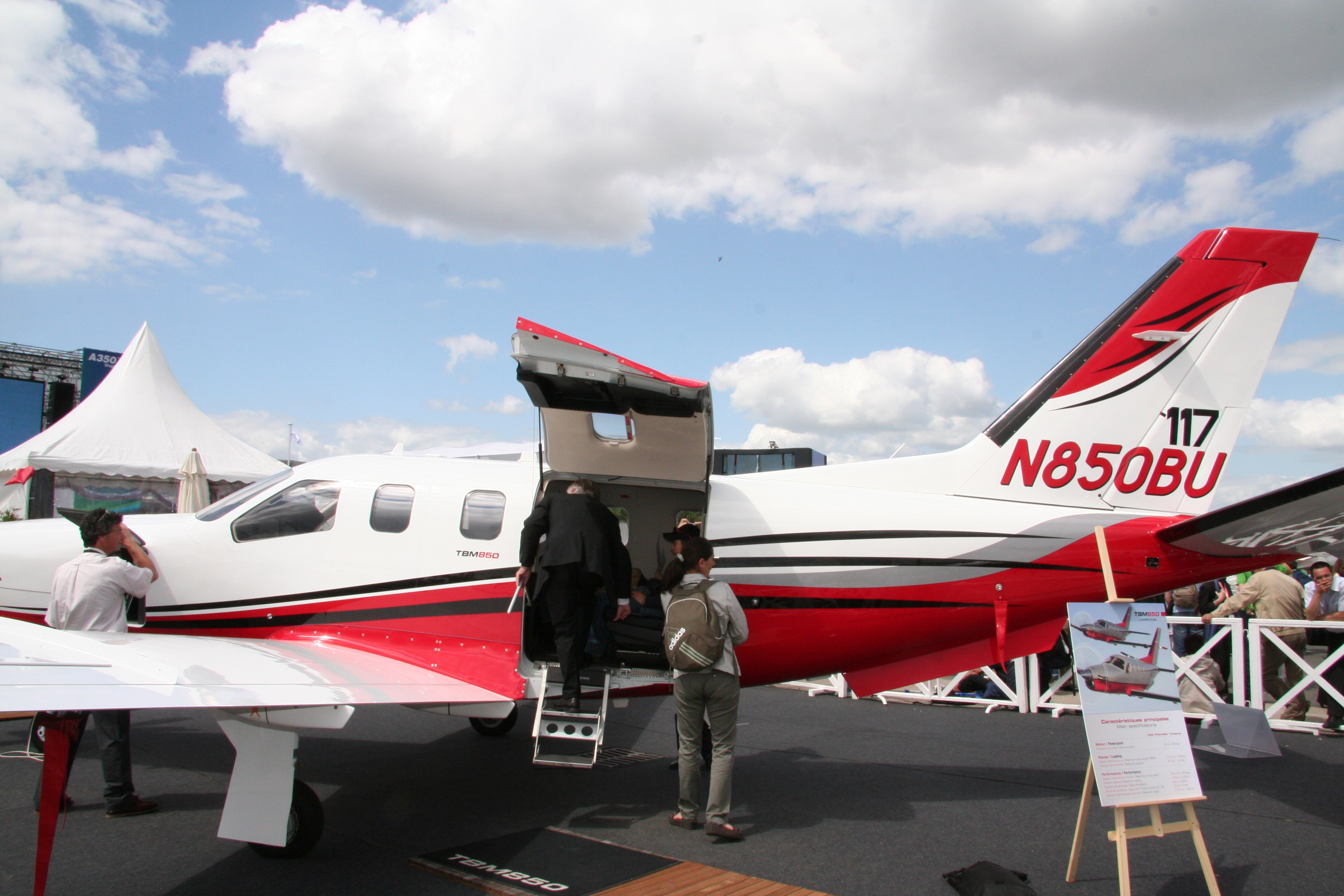
Rear access door of a TBM 850

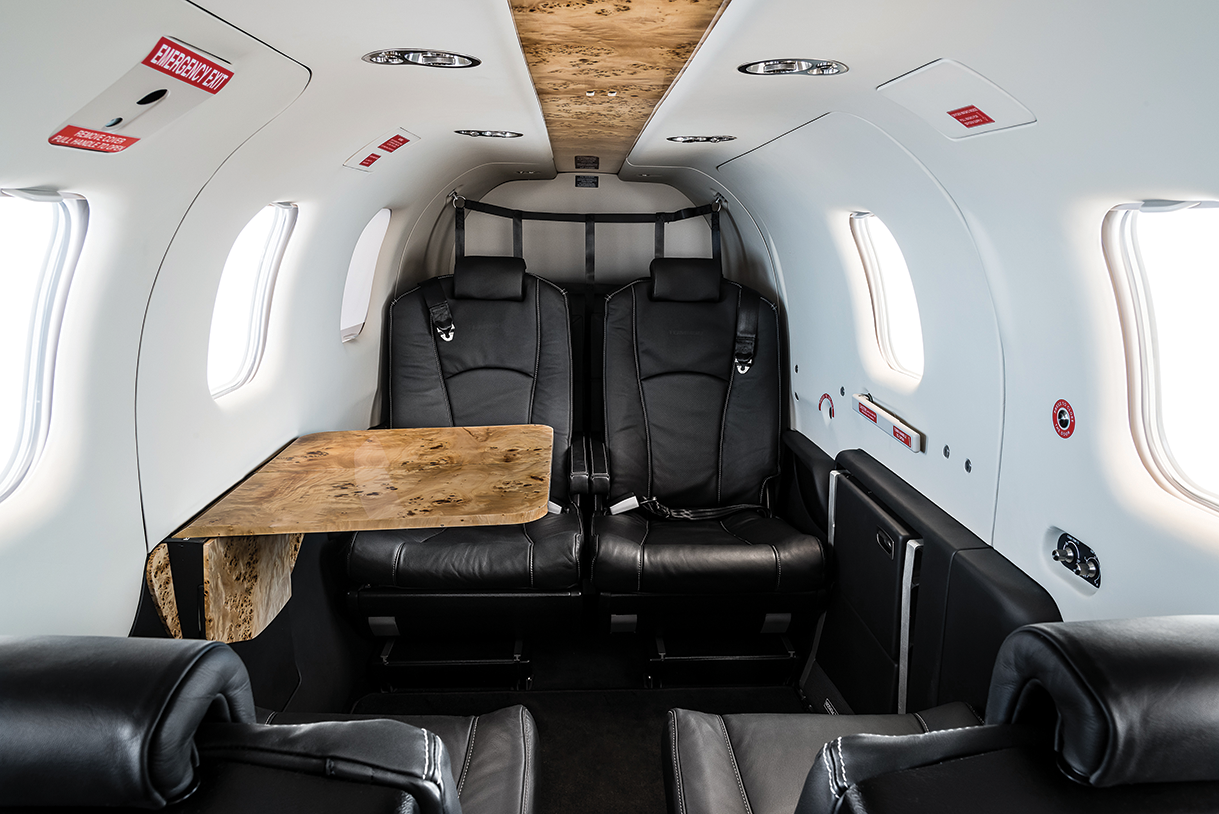
Cabin of a TBM 850 in 6-seat configuration

TBM 700A
Initial production version with one Pratt & Whitney Canada PT6A-64 turboprop engine.
TBM 700B
Variant with wide entrance door, increased maximum zero fuel weight and other improvements.
TBM 700C1
Improved version with rear unpressurised cargo compartment, reinforced structure, new air conditioning system and other improvements.
TBM 700C2
C1 with increased maximum takeoff weight.
TBM 700N
Initial production name of the TBM 850.
TBM 850
Higher-performance version fitted with a Pratt & Whitney Canada PT6A-66D engine, rated at 850 hp in flight (700 hp at take-off).
TBM 850 G1000
TBM 850 with a G1000 Integrated Flight Deck and a fuel tank extension modification.
TBM 850 Elite
Updated version of the TBM 850, including four cabin seats in a forward-facing configuration, allowing for an increased cargo area aft of the cabin.
TBM 900
introduced in March 2014, improved version of the TBM 850 with various aerodynamic refinements, including winglets and a redesigned induction system. Maximum cruise speed increased to 330 kn (611 km/h, 380 mph) at FL310. Range of 1,730 nmi (3,204 km, 1,990 mi)—with 45-minute standard IFR reserves—at 252 kn (467 km/h, 290 mph) and 37 gph (140 L/h), or 1,585 nmi (2,935.42 km, 1,824 mi) at 290 kn (333 mph, 537 km/h). The 40% larger intake frees up airflow, giving an 80 hp (60 kW) boost for the same fuel flow and shortening the take-off roll by 20%. The previously optional Hartzell five-blade carbon fiber propeller is now standard, increasing performance and decreasing cabin noise.
TBM 910
New version introduced in April 2017, with the upgraded avionics suite Garmin G1000 NXi. The 910 replaced the 900 in the TBM lineup and as of June 2022 is offered alongside the new 960. In 2023, its equipped price was $4.546M.
TBM 930
Introduced in April 2016, with upgraded interior and avionics, including the Garmin G3000 touchscreen avionics suite. The TBM 930 did not replace but augmented the 900 in the TBM lineup.
TBM 940
Introduced in March 2019, with autothrottle and automatic deicing. It was certified by EBACE show in May. On a standard day, the TBM 940 climbs to FL280 in 17min ½, within 64nmi (119km, 74mi), for a 7,600ft cabin altitude with the 6.2 psi (0.43 bar) pressurisation, fuel flow is 59 US gallons (223 litres, 49 imperial gallons) per hour at maximum cruise power, reaching 304 kn (350 mph; 563 km/h) at ISA +13°C instead of 326 kn (375 mph; 604 km/h) on a standard day. In 2021, its equipped price was $4.575M. The TBM 940 replaced the 930 in the lineup.
TBM 960
Introduced on 5 April 2022 at Sun 'n Fun in Florida, powered by a PT6E-66XT controlled by a dual-channel full authority digital engine control (FADEC) that Daher calls an EPECS (Engine and Propeller Electronic Control System)—a first for the TBM line, five-Blade Hartzell Propeller Raptor, autoland function, a 221 lb (100 kg) MTOW increase to 7,615 lb (3,454 kg), priced at US$ 4.57 million, 4.8 million with an optional 140 lb (64 kg) prestige cabin. The TBM 960 replaced the 940 in the TBM lineup and as of June 2022 is offered alongside the baseline TBM 910 model. In 2023, its price was $4.998M.
TBM 980
Unveiled in January 2026, it features upgrades to the avionics, with the adoption of the Garmin G3000 PRIME suite, and to the passenger cabin, with improved information display and the possibility to install a Starlink terminal.

=== Production ===
By June 2018, the TBM fleet had logged a combined 1.6 million flight hours. By July 2018, 900 aircraft had been delivered. By October 2019, 954 TBMs had been built and flew 1.76 million hours, with 734 delivered in North America and 158 in Europe. By July 2023, 1,155 TBM series aircraft had been produced.

Production:

- TBM overall series – 1,155 (by July 2023)
  - TBM 700 – 324 built between 1990 and 2005
  - TBM 850 – 338 built between 2006 and 2013
  - TBM 900/910/930/960 – 488 built (by July 2023)
    - TBM 900 – 114 built between 2014 and 2016
    - TBM 910 – 29 built since 2017
    - TBM 930 – 74 built since 2016.
    - TBM 960 – 100 built as of Jan 2024.

== Operators ==
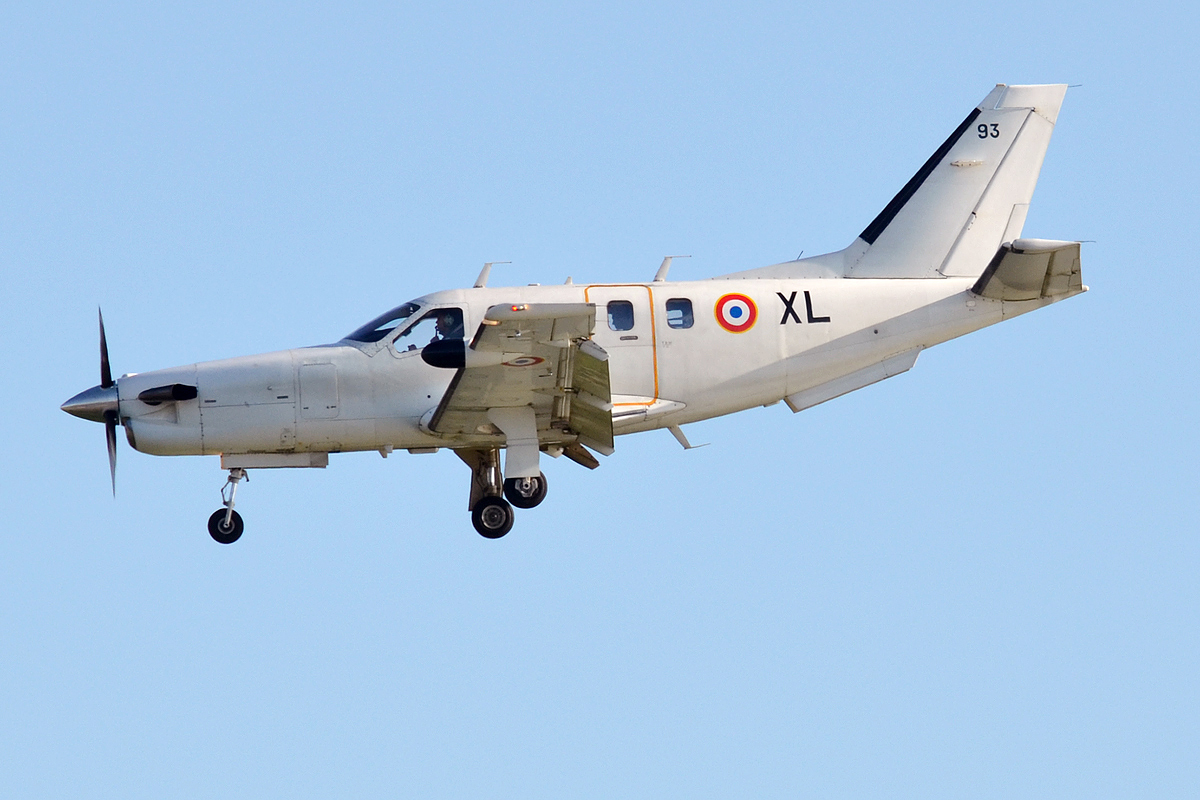
A French Air and Space Force TBM 700. Note the small door aft of the wing.

Since its introduction, around 30 have served in commercial aviation and in October 2018, 17 were still used for the role in 10 companies, mostly in the US, among a global fleet of 900. In 2017, 57 units were shipped. Daher claims direct operating costs are $2.48 per nautical mile. Owner-operators fly 90% of all TBMs, while they account for 20% to 30% of the larger Pilatus PC-12 sales. The aircraft is used by both private individuals, corporations and charter and hire companies.

=== Military operators ===
France

- French Air and Space Force – 15 in service (2016).
- French Army Light Aviation (ALAT) – 8 in service (2016).

== Accidents and incidents ==
The Aviation Safety Network wikibase (added by its users) reports 93 accidents and incidents between 15 November 1991 and 30 March 2024, and a total of 84 fatalities

TBM 700 series - 62 occurrences, 66 fatalities

TBM 800 series - 33 occurrences, 12 fatalities

TBM 900 series - 17 occurrences, 6 fatalities

== Specifications (TBM 900) ==
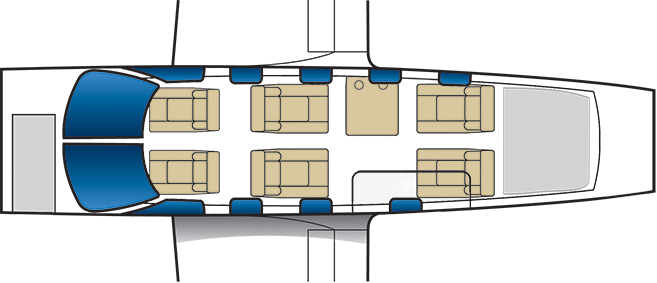
Diagram of a TBM 850 interior in a 6-seat configuration

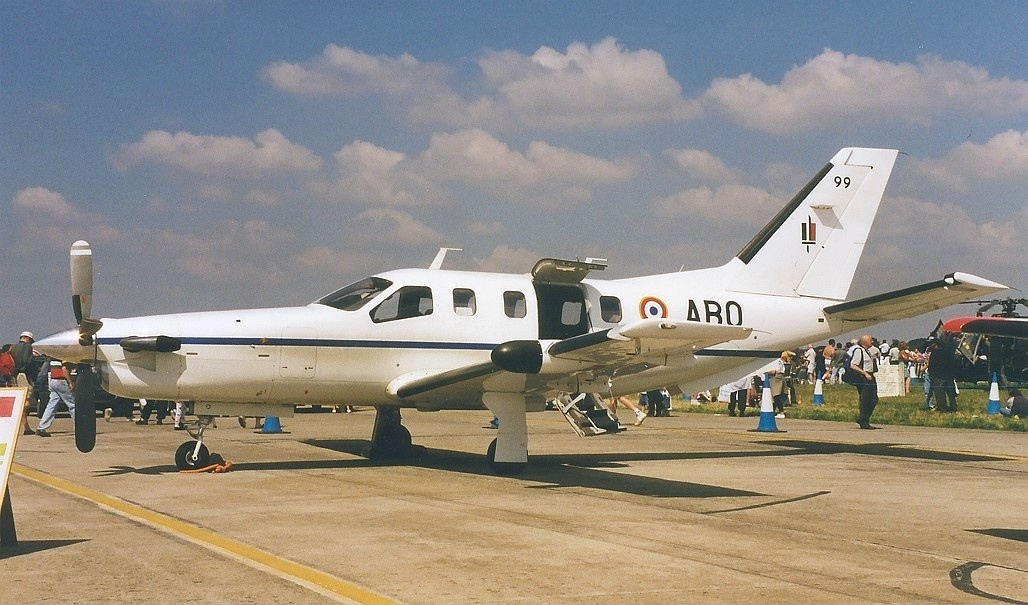
A TBM 700 on static display

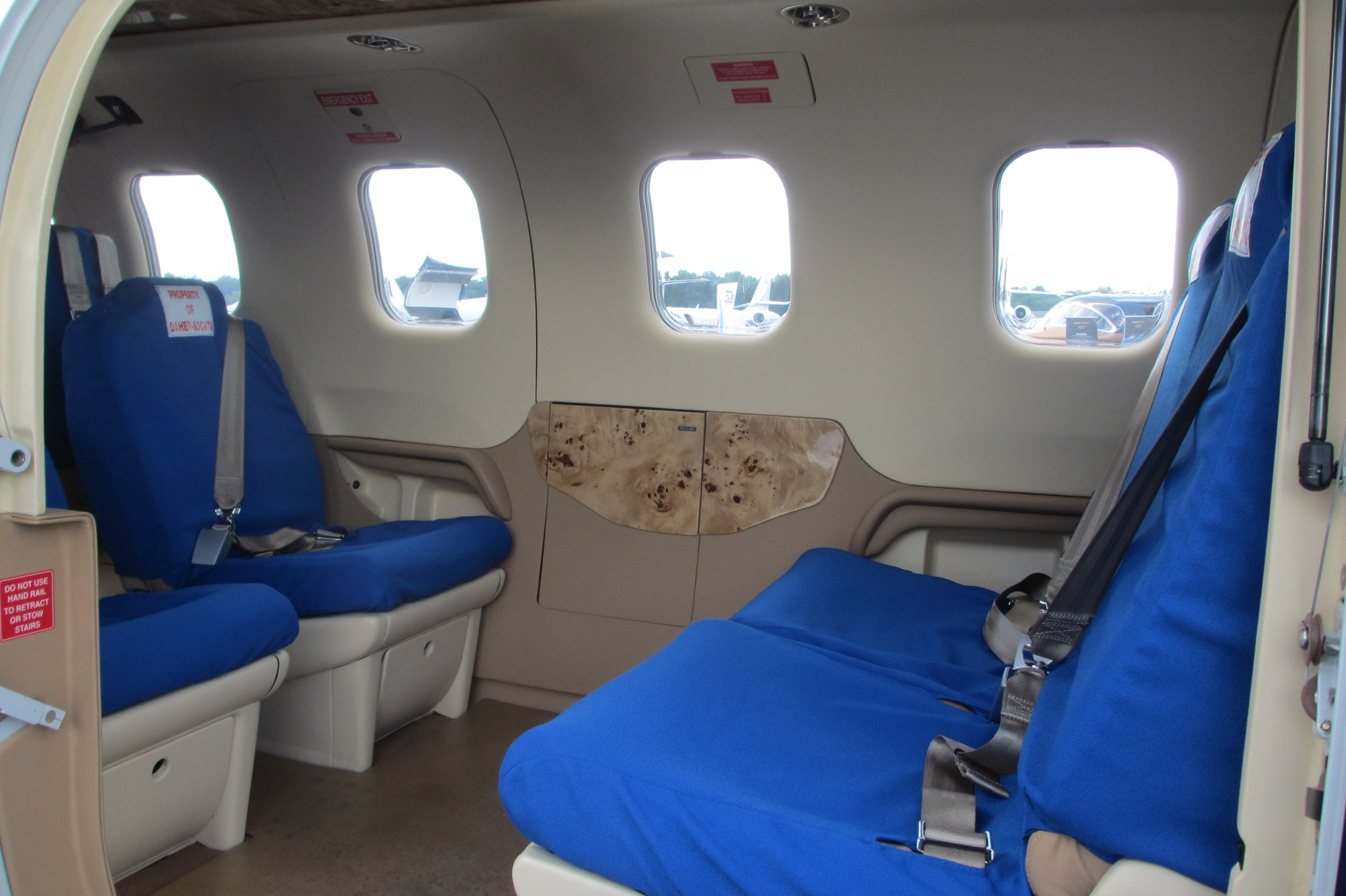
Interior view of a TBM cabin

Data from TBM

General characteristics

- Crew: 1 or 2
- Capacity: 4-6 (including flight crew) / 636 kg (1,402 lb) max payload
- Length: 10.72 m (35 ft 2 in)
- Wingspan: 12.83 m (42 ft 1 in)
- Height: 4.355 m (14 ft 3 in)
- Wing area: 18.0 m^{2} (194 sq ft)
- Aspect ratio: 9.145
- Airfoil: root: RA 16-43; tip: RA 13.3-43
- Empty weight: 2,097 kg (4,623 lb)
- Max takeoff weight: 3,354 kg (7,394 lb)
- Fuel capacity: 1,100 L (240 imp gal; 290 US gal) usable
- Powerplant: 1 × Pratt & Whitney Canada PT6A-66D turboprop engine, 630 kW (850 shp)
- Propellers: 5-bladed Hartzell constant-speed propeller

Performance

- Maximum speed: 611 km/h (380 mph, 330 kn) maximum cruise at 8,534 m (28,000 ft)
- Cruise speed: 467 km/h (290 mph, 252 kn) long-range cruise at 9,449 m (31,001 ft)
- Range: 3,304 km (2,053 mi, 1,784 nmi) with max fuel at long-range cruise and 9,449 m (31,001 ft)
- Service ceiling: 9,449 m (31,001 ft)
- Time to altitude: 9,449 m (31,001 ft) in 18 minutes 45 seconds
- Fuel consumption: 208 L/h (55 gal/h; 46 imp gal/h) / 164 kg/h (362 lb/h) at 593 km/h (368 mph; 320 kn) TAS, FL310, normal cruise, at 2,858 kg (6,301 lb)
- Take-off run: 726 m (2,382 ft)
- Landing run: 741 m (2,431 ft)

== See also ==
Related development

- Mooney 301

Aircraft of comparable role, configuration, and era

- Epic LT and E1000
- Myasishchev M-101T
- Pilatus PC-12
- Piper Meridian
- Aero Ae 270 Spirit (never reached production)
- Kestrel K-350 (never reached production)
