= Garmin G1000 =

Electronic flight instrument system

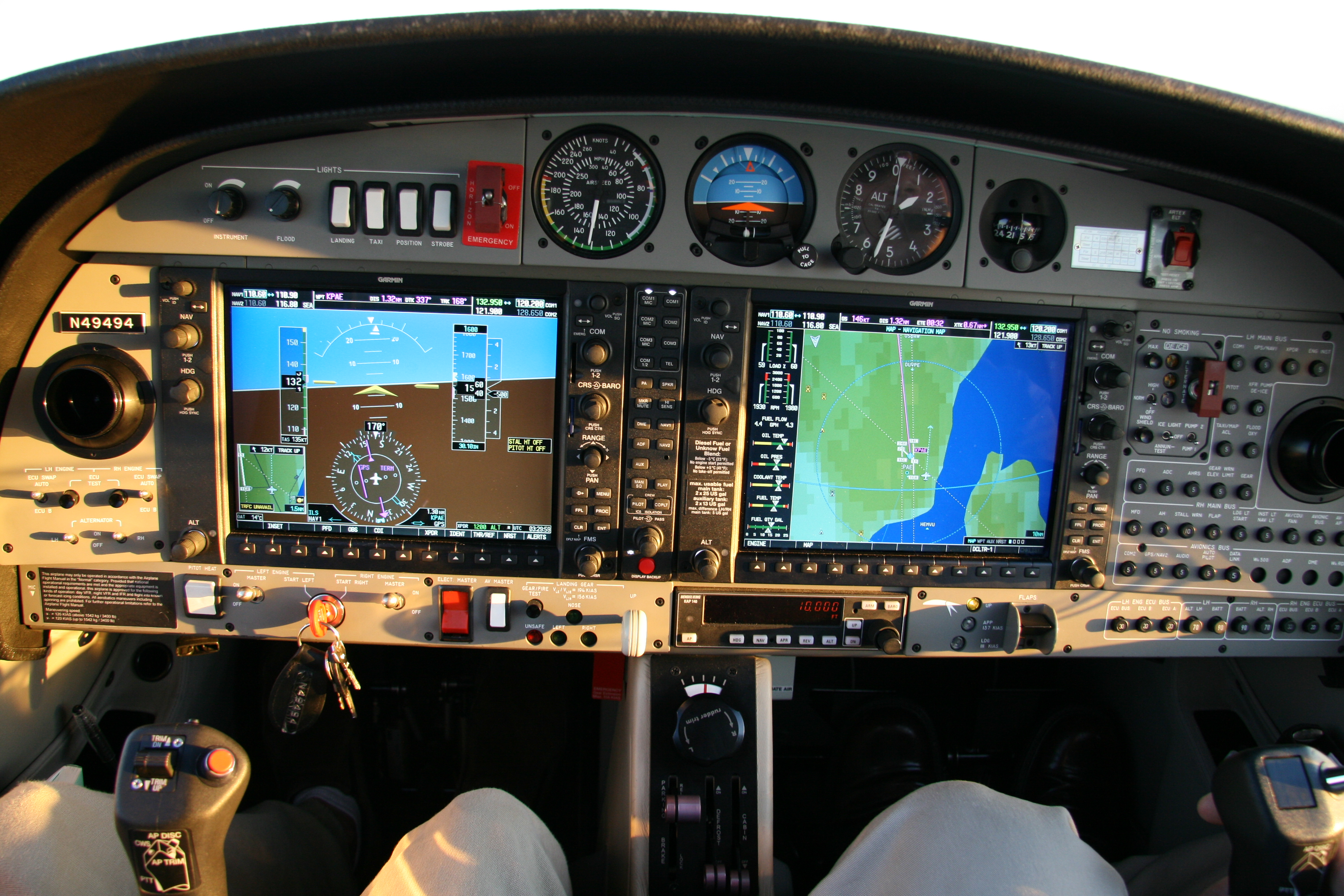
Diamond DA42 Twin Star cockpit with Garmin G1000

The Garmin G1000 is an electronic flight instrument system (EFIS) typically composed of two display units, one serving as a primary flight display, and one as a multi-function display. Manufactured by Garmin Aviation, it serves as a replacement for most conventional flight instruments and avionics. Introduced in June 2004, the system has since become one of the most popular integrated glass cockpit solutions for general aviation and business aircraft.

== Components ==
An aircraft with a basic Garmin G1000 installation contains two LCDs (one acting as the primary flight display and the other as the multi-function display) as well as an integrated communications panel that fits between the two. These displays are designated as a GDU, Garmin Display Unit.

Beyond that, additional features are found on newer and larger G1000 installations, such as in business jets. This includes:

- A third display unit, to act as a co-pilot PFD
- An alphanumeric keyboard
- An integrated flight director/autopilot (without it, the G1000 interfaces with an external autopilot)

Depending on the airplane manufacturer and whether or not a GFC 700 autopilot is installed, the G1000 system will consist of either two GDU 1040 displays (no autopilot), a GDU 1040 PFD/GDU 1043 MFD (GFC 700 autopilot installed), or a GDU 1045 PFD/GDU 1045 MFD (GFC 700 autopilot installed with VNAV).

The GDU 1040 is the standard base bezel with no autopilot/flight director mode selection keys below the heading bug. The GDU 1043 has autopilot/flight director keys for all GFC 700 modes except VNAV. The GDU 1045 is essentially identical to the GDU 1043 except for the addition of an autopilot/flight director mode for VNAV. Depending on how the units are installed, an MFD failure may, or may not, affect autopilot or flight director use. If a GDU 1040 is used as a PFD in an airplane equipped with a GFC 700 autopilot, a failure of the MFD (which houses the autopilot mode selection keys) will leave the autopilot engaged, but the modes cannot be changed because no autopilot keys are present on the PFD. But, if an MFD failure occurs in an airplane with the GFC 700 autopilot and either a GDU 1043 or a GDU 1045 bezel installed as a PFD, the pilot will have full use of the autopilot through the keys on the PFD.

Both the PFD and MFD each have two slots for SD memory cards. The top slot is used to update the Jeppesen aviation database (also known as NavData) every 28 days, and to load software and configuration to the system. The aviation database must be current to use GPS for navigation during IFR instrument approaches. The bottom slot houses the World terrain and Jeppesen obstacle databases. While terrain information rarely changes or needs to be updated, obstacle databases can be updated every 56 days through a subscription service. The top card can be removed from the G1000 system following an update, but the bottom card must stay in both the PFD and MFD to ensure accurate terrain awareness and TAWS-B information.

== Primary flight display ==
Screenshot of the PFD on the G1000

The primary flight display (PFD) shows the basic flight instruments, such as the attitude indicator, airspeed indicator, altimeter, heading indicator, and course deviation indicator. A small map called the "inset map" can be enabled in the corner. The buttons on the PFD are used to set the squawk code on the transponder. The PFD can also be used for entering and activating flight plans. The PFD also has a "reversionary mode" which is capable of displaying all information shown on the MFD (for example, engine gauges and navigational information). This capability is provided in case of an MFD failure.

== Multi-function display ==
The MFD usually shows engine instrumentation and a moving map.

The multi-function display (MFD) typically shows a moving map on the right side, and engine instrumentation on the left. Most of the other screens in the G1000 system are accessed by turning the knob on the lower right corner of the unit. Screens available from the MFD other than the map include the setup menus, information about nearest airports and NAVAIDs, Mode S traffic reports, terrain awareness, XM radio, flight plan programming, and GPS RAIM prediction.

== Implementation ==
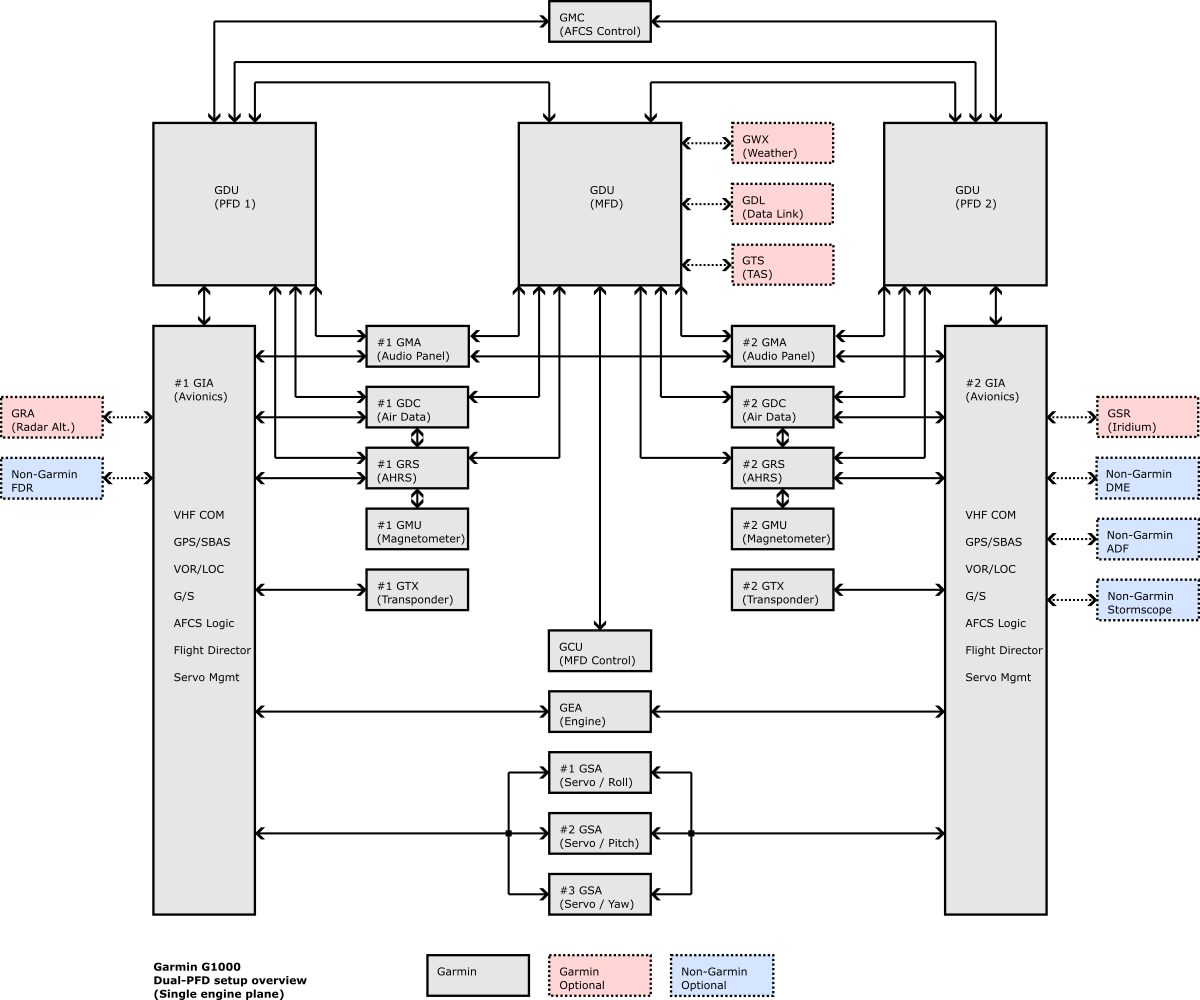
Garmin G1000 setup overview

The G1000 system consists of several integrated components which sample and exchange data or display information to the pilot.

=== GDU display ===
The GDU display unit acts as the primary source of flight information for the pilot. Each display can interchangeably serve as a primary flight display (PFD) or multi-function display (MFD). The wiring harness within the aircraft specifies which role each display is in by default. All of the displays within an aircraft are interconnected using a high-speed Ethernet data bus. A G1000 installation may have two GDUs (one PFD and one MFD) or three (one PFD for each pilot and an MFD). There are several different GDU models in service, which have different screen sizes (from 10 inches to 15 inches) and different bezel controls.

In normal operation, the display in front of the pilot is the PFD and will provide aircraft attitude, airspeed, altitude, vertical speed, heading, rate-of-turn, slip-and-skid, navigation, transponder, inset map view (containing map, traffic, and terrain information), and systems annunciation data. The second display, typically positioned to the right of the PFD, operates in MFD mode and provides engine instrumentation and a moving map display. The moving map can be replaced or overlaid by various other types of data, such as satellite weather, checklists, system information, waypoint information, weather sensor data, and traffic awareness information.

Both displays provide redundant information regarding communications and navigation radio frequency settings even though each display is usually only paired with one GIA Integrated Avionics Unit. In the event of a single display failure, the remaining display will adopt a combined "reversionary mode" and automatically become a PFD combined with engine instrumentation data and other functions of the MFD. A red button labeled "reversionary mode" or "display backup," located on the GMA audio panel, is also available to the pilot to select this mode manually if desired.

=== GMA audio panel ===
The GMA panel provides buttons for selecting what audio sources are heard by each member of the cockpit. It also includes a button for forcing the integrated cockpit into its fail-safe reversionary mode.

=== GMC/GCU remote controllers ===
The GMC and GCU controllers are panel-mounted modules which provide a more intuitive interface for the pilot than that provided by the GDU. The GMC controls the G1000's autopilot, while the GCU is used to enter navigational data and control the GDU's

=== GIA integrated avionics unit ===
The GIA unit is a combined communications and navigation radio, and also serves as the primary data aggregator for the G1000 system. It provides a two-way VHF communications transceiver, a VHF navigation receiver with glideslope, a GPS receiver, and a variety of supporting processors. Each unit is paired with a GDU display, which acts as a controlling unit. The GIA 63W, found on many newer G1000 installations, is an updated version of the older GIA 63 which includes Wide Area Augmentation System support.

=== GDC air data computer ===
The GDC computer replaces the internal components of the pitot-static system in traditional aircraft instrumentation. It measures airspeed, altitude, vertical speed, and outside air temperature. This data is then provided to all the displays and integrated avionics units.

=== GRS attitude and heading reference system (AHRS) ===
The GRS system uses solid-state sensors to measure aircraft attitude, rate of turn, and slip and skid. This data is then provided to all the integrated avionics units and GDU display units. Unlike many competing systems, the AHRS can be rebooted and recalibrated in flight during turns of up to 20 degrees.

=== GMU magnetometer ===
The GMU magnetometer measures aircraft heading and is a digital version of a traditional compass. It does so through aligning itself with the magnetic flux lines of the earth.

=== GTX transponder ===
Either the GTX 32 or GTX 33 transponder can be used in the G1000 system, although the GTX 33 is far more common. The GTX 32 provides standard mode-C replies to ATC interrogations while the GTX 33 provides mode-S bidirectional communications with ATC and therefore can indicate traffic in the area as well as announce itself spontaneously via "squittering" without prior interrogation.

=== GEA engine/airframe unit ===
The GEA unit measures a large variety of engine and airframe parameters, including engine RPM, manifold pressure, oil temperature, cylinder head temperature, exhaust gas temperature, and fuel level in each tank. This data is then provided to the integrated avionics units.

=== GSD data aggregator ===
The GSD is a data aggregator system included on complex G1000 systems, such as that found on the Embraer Phenom 100. It serves as a point of connection which allows external systems to communicate with the G1000.

=== Backup systems ===
As a condition of certification, all aircraft utilizing the G1000 integrated cockpit must have a redundant airspeed indicator, altimeter, attitude indicator, and magnetic compass. In the event of a failure of the G1000 instrumentation, these backup instruments become primary.

In addition, a secondary power source is required to power the G1000 instrumentation for a limited time in the event of a failure of the aircraft's alternator and primary battery.

== Certification ==
The Garmin G1000 is generally certified on new general aviation aircraft, including Beechcraft, Cessna, Diamond, Cirrus, Mooney, Piper, Quest (the Quest Kodiak), and Tiger. In late 2005, Garmin first announced in the G1000 in the Columbia Aircraft Model 400, later sold to Cessna. Garmin announced its first G1000 retrofit program for the Beechcraft C90 King Air in 2007. That same year the Garmin G1000 became a jet platform, as the avionics system for the Cessna Citation Mustang very light jet. Versions of the G1000 are also used in the Embraer Phenom 100 and Embraer Phenom 300, and PiperJet, as well as the Bell SLS helicopter.

== Competition ==
The G1000 competes with the Avidyne Entegra and Chelton FlightLogic EFIS glass cockpits. However, there are significant differences with regard to the features, degree of integration, intuitive aspects of the design, and overall product utility. Note that the Chelton system is not typically found in airplanes that include the less expensive G1000 or Avidyne systems.

In 2009 Garmin introduced the Garmin G500 as a retrofit glass cockpit. The G500 has the majority of the capabilities of the G1000, other than integration with the aircraft engine system.

== Training and training resources ==
Flying any glass cockpit aircraft requires transition training to familiarize the pilot with the aircraft's systems. Transition training is most effective when a pilot prepares ahead of time. Most general aviation manufacturers using the G1000 system have FAA Industry Training Standards (FITS) training programs for pilots transitioning into their airplanes. FAA FITS compliant training is recommended for any pilot transitioning to the G1000 or any other glass cockpit prior to operating the aircraft in instrument meteorological conditions (IMC) or if operating a glass cockpit aircraft for the first time. Glass cockpit aircraft may not be suitable for primary training.

One of the most effective resources for preparing for G1000 transition training include the Garmin simulator software. In addition, some flight schools now have G1000 flight training devices (FTDs) that provide realistic simulation.

All of the most current Garmin G1000 pilot's guides are available from Garmin as free downloads in PDF format.

== See also ==
Related development

- Garmin G3000
