= Daher Kodiak =

Utility aircraft

Kodiak
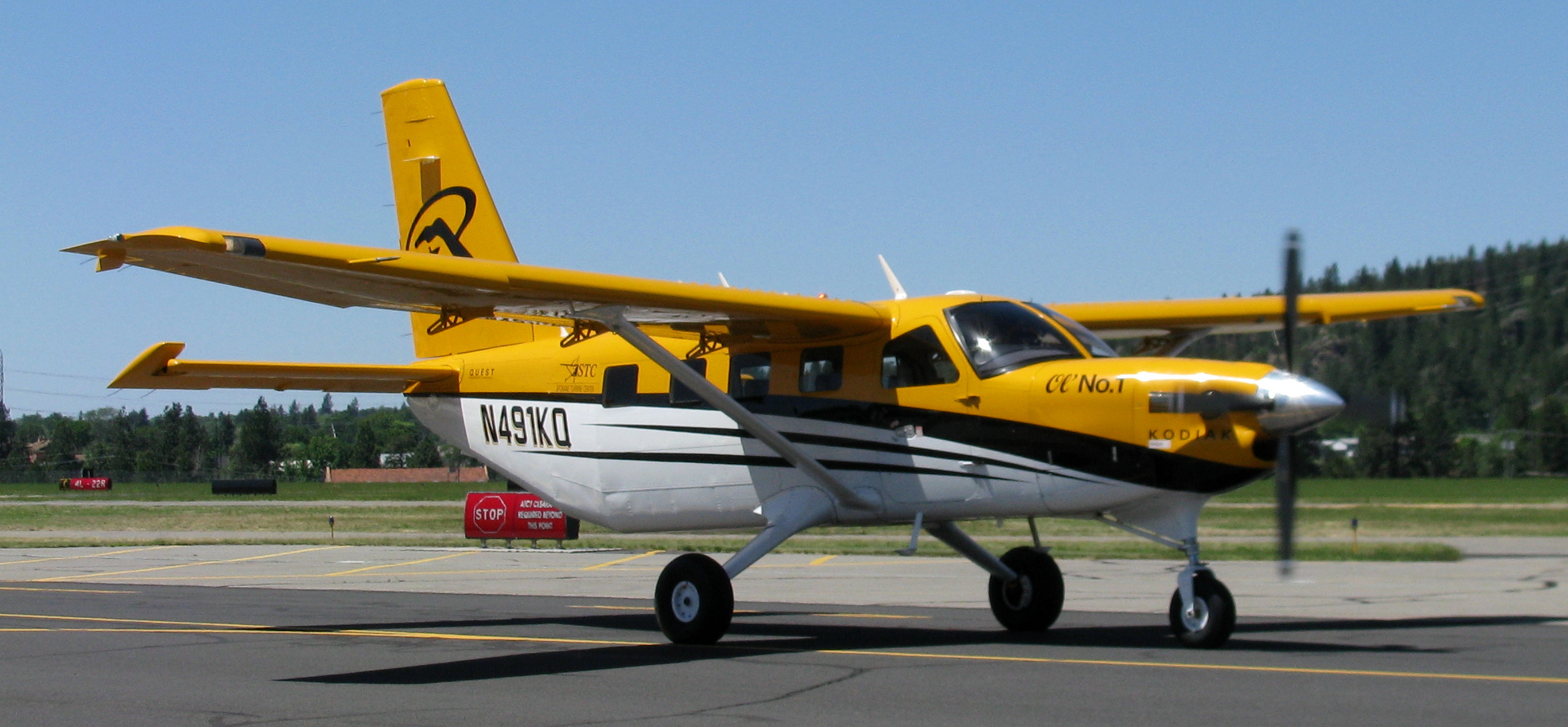

General information
- Type: Utility aircraft
- National origin: United States
- Manufacturer: Quest Aircraft; Daher
- Designer: Evan Mortenson
- Status: In production
- Number built: 300 (2021)

History
- Manufactured: 2007-present
- Introduction date: January 2008
- First flight: October 16, 2004

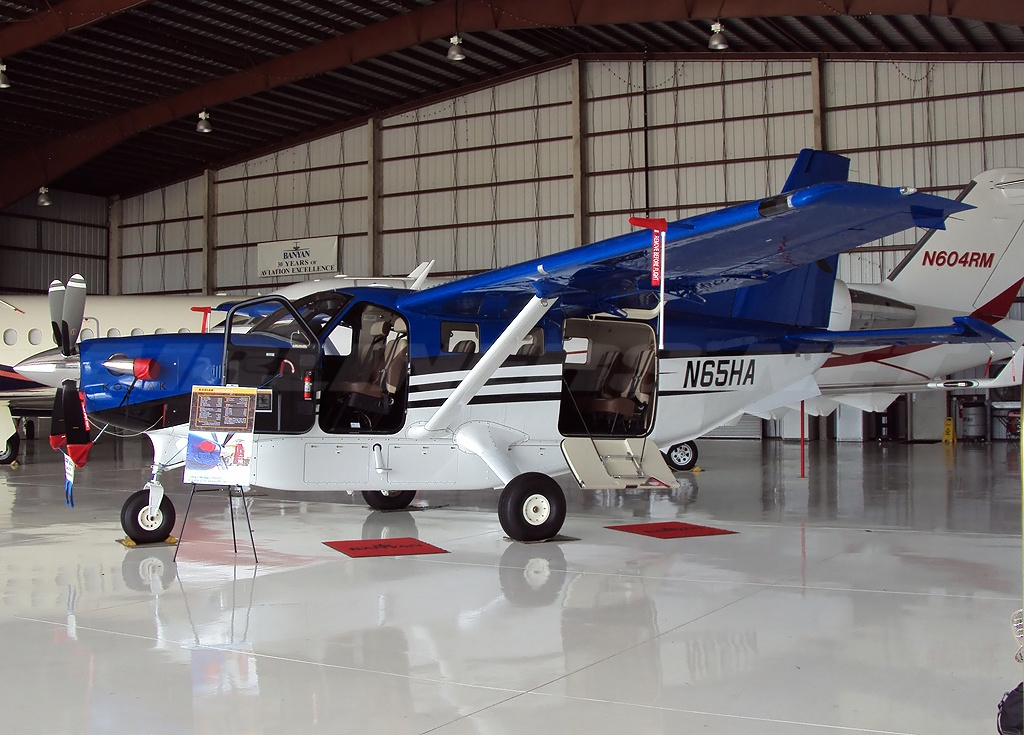
Kodiak in a hangar with left-side doors open

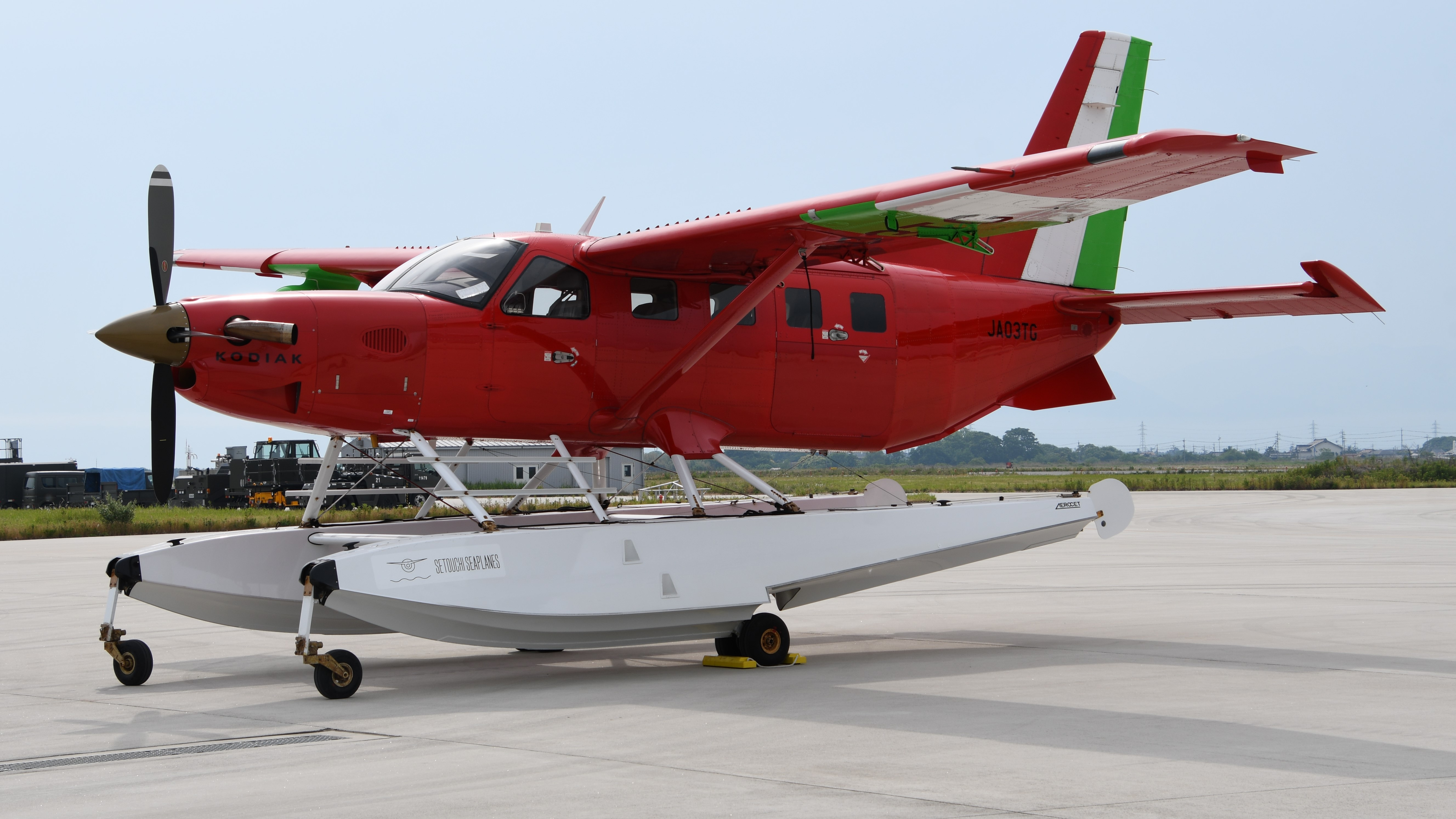
Quest Kodiak on amphibious floats

The Daher Kodiak (formerly Quest Kodiak) is an American utility aircraft designed by and originally manufactured by Quest Aircraft in Sandpoint, Idaho. Manufacturing was taken over by Daher in 2019 after its purchase of Quest Aircraft. The high-wing, unpressurized, single-engined turboprop has a fixed tricycle landing gear and is suitable for STOL operations from unimproved airfields.

Design work began in 1999 and the prototype made its maiden flight on October 16, 2004. The aircraft was certified on 31 May 2007 and the first delivery took place in January 2008. By 2021, 300 aircraft had been delivered.

== Development ==
The origins of the Daher Kodiak can be traced back to 1985 and the meeting of pilot David L. Voetmann with aircraft designer Tom Hamilton. Both individuals shared a mutual interested in bush aircraft that were suitable for the inhospitable operating conditions common across Africa]. Following market research, it was determined that such an aircraft ought to have easily-repairable all-aluminum construction, provide double the cargo volume and weight capacity of the Cessna 206, be able to accommodate an external belly cargo pod, be powered by a turboprop engine compatible with Jet-A fuel, wet wing cells located aft of the primary sparto hold all of the aircraft's fuel, seat up to ten occupants in commercial operations, calm low-speed handling, a wingspan of less than 45 ft. to permit the use of narrow landing strips, a lightweight footprint compatible with waterlogged grounds, and nosewheel steering capable of turning on slippery wet clay runways. It was intended to produce a commercially-viable aircraft that would be specifically designed to fulfil the requirements of missionaries, as well as humanitarian relief, private individuals, air-charter operators, corporate users, and government agencies (the latter as a special-use aircraft).

In 1999, engineering design work commenced. Shortly thereafter, Quest Aircraft was founded as a spin-off from Idaho Air Group specifically to complete the aircraft's development and production. The estimated cost of development, test-flying, and certifying the Kodiak was reportedly $25 million. By 2006, Quest had secured seven commercial orders for the type along with 15 non-commercial sales to missionary groups.

On October 16, 2004, the prototype conducted its maiden flight, piloted by Bruce Barrett; the flight test programme proceeded over the following twelve months. This prototype was somewhat lighter that subsequent production aircraft due to its lack of both an interior or cockpit dashboard. On 16 March 2007, the first production aircraft made its first flight; it was initially used for function and reliability flight testing. The design was type certified by the US Federal Aviation Administration on 31 May 2007.

In June 2010, Wipaire, Inc. was granted Supplemental Type Certification allowing Wipline 7000 amphibious floats to be installed on Kodiaks. In November of that same year, it was also certified for flight into known icing after the installation of a TKS system, which protects exposed surfaces via glycol-based fluids.

When originally launched, the Kodiak was to be available in four options packages, these being basic, utility (convertible interior), adventure (durable interior), and executive (luxury interior). In 2014, an executive "Summit interior" with club seating was certified.

In April 2017, the Kodiak 100 received its type certificate from the European Aviation Safety Agency (EASA).

In May 2018, Quest Aircraft unveiled the Series II, priced at $2.15 million. The airframe has improved cargo door step mechanism and wing-root sealing, new crew-door stays, optional single-point refueling, and new paint schemes. The cockpit has compact backup instruments, a faster Garmin G1000 NXi with HSI map displaying traffic, terrain, weather, navaids, and obstacles and a multifunction display showing terrain, usable for weight and balance and permitting autopilot visual approaches.

In 2019, French aircraft manufacturer Daher acquired Quest Aircraft from Setouchi Holdings. The Series III version was unveiled in March 2021.

The stretched Kodiak 900 model received its European type certificate in April 2023. In 2023, its equipped price was $2.95 million, and $3.49 million for the stretched -900.

== Design ==
The Daher Kodiak is a utility aircraft that features short-field performance and compatibility with austere operating conditions. The Kodiak is bigger than the DHC-2 Beaver, but smaller than the DHC-3 Otter or Cessna Caravan. It has more power than the older de Havillands and takes off in less distance than the Caravan.

The aircraft's STOL performance is partially attributable to the design of its wing, which featured a discontinuous leading edge near the wingtips and had a noticeable droop to improve the aircraft's stall characteristics. The trailing edge of the wing is fitted with lengthy and wide-chord Fowler flaps along with leading edge vortex generators that improve the aircraft's performance at high AOA. Additional vortex generators located on top of the horizontal stabilizer enhance the aircraft's controllability, along with a relatively tall vertical fin and a sizable rudder. Microscopic holes in the leading edge are used to distribute anti-icing fluid. Furthermore, the wing features an intentionally restrictive wingspan as to permit easier operations from space-constrained airstrips.

It is powered by a single Pratt & Whitney Canada PT6A-34 turboprop engine, capable of producing up to 750 hp (559 kW). The cowling is angled as to optimise takeoff thrust while the exhaust stacks are intentionally pointed rearwards as to reduce the likelihood of unintentionally igniting tall grass. The aircraft is equipped with a four-bladed propeller that has a ground clearance of 19 inches, which was deemed to be suitable for operating from the majority of rough terrain.

The airframe features semi-monocoque construction and is primarily composed of aluminum alloys, which can be readily repaired in the field. Traditional mechanical fasteners were used to attach various elements, including stringers, hoop frames, ribs, spars, skins and bulkheads. Components that are subject to heavy loads, such as the attachment fitting for the wing struts and landing gear, were milled out of solid aluminum billets. The rear of the fuselage accommodates a sizable clamshell door while separate access doors are present for the pilots. On some configurations, high-impact passenger seats are fitted; these are mounted on tracks and can be easily removed as to accommodate cargo or a combination of both passengers and cargo. For weight-management purposed during cargo loading, an aft tail jack-stand is incorporated; an external belly pod is optionally available. The cabin is unpressurized.

The Kodiak is equipped with manually-actuated primary flight controls that use a traditional arrangement of cables, pulleys and push-rods; the flaps are electrically-actuated and a three-axis electric trim system is present. Every flight control surface is composed of aluminum. From the onset of production, the aircraft was outfitted with a glass cockpit, the Garmin G1000 avionics suite being standard equipment and lacks an autopilot. The Kodiak Series II is more refined and has upgraded door and wing root seals to reduce wind leaks and exhaust odors. The model's upgraded Garmin G1000NXi avionics are similar to the original G1000 with three 10 in (250 mm) screens, but is more responsive and offers more PFD insets, including a mini moving map, which can display traffic, terrain, waypoints and weather.

The tricycle landing gear arrangement was designed to be particularly durable even amongst competing bush aircraft. Oversized tires can be optionally fitted in order to increase buoyancy and ground clearence alike. Furthermore, the landing gear was intentionally designed to be rapidly removable so that it can be easily converted to a float configuration; to this end, both the wing struts and engine mounts can accommodate the landing loads imposed by the floats. As an option, Aerocet carbon-fiber floats can be fitted, which weigh 700 lb (320 kg) with wheels or 400 lb (180 kg) without wheels; these carbon-fiber floats are 380 lb (170 kg) lighter than aluminum counterparts while cruising 8 kn (15 km/h) faster and are more watertight. The Aerocet floats can be operated in 18–20 in (46–51 cm) waves.

== Operational history ==
The first Kodiak was delivered to launch customer Spirit Air in January 2008. By September 2013, 100 Kodiaks had been built, with the 100th aircraft being delivered to US operator Sunstate Aviation. The Kodiak was designed for use by mission societies, and several aircraft have been delivered to organisations such as Mission Aviation Fellowship and JAARS. However one MAF Kodiak was lost in a crash in 2020. Some of the Kodiaks built have been produced under Quest Aircraft's Quest Mission Team (QMT) program. The QMT program aims to sell one of every 11 Kodiaks built to a mission organisation at cost price.

The 200th aircraft was delivered in December 2016 for a record yearly production of 36 Kodiaks, while the production facility was extended by 25 percent in September of that year to cope with growing demand. The 250th aircraft was delivered in 2018, as the highest time aircraft surpassed 5,000 hours. The 300th aircraft had been delivered by December 2021, as the fleet had logged over 278,700 flight hours.

== Variants ==
Kodiak 100
Base model, FAA certificated 31 May 2007.
Kodiak 100 Series II
Model introduced in May 2018, incorporating improvements, including a Garmin G1000NXi avionics suite, Flight Stream 510 tablet connection device, an angle-of-attack indicator and a digital standby four instrument group.
Kodiak 100 Series III
Model introduced in March 2021, incorporating a Garmin G1000 NXi instrument panel, a GFC 700 autopilot, SurfaceWatch runway monitoring technology, synthetic vision system and an optional Garmin GWX 75 Doppler-capable weather radar. An eight-seat "Executive Edition" VIP cabin was also introduced. It has club-seating, increased oxygen volume, along with air conditioning with separate controls for the cockpit and cabin. In March 2023, an optional 96 in (2.44 m), five-bladed Hartzell Propeller composite propeller was offered. The new propeller is six dB(A) quieter, gives a five percent shorter takeoff roll and is 13 pounds lighter than the standard four-blade aluminum Hartzell propeller.

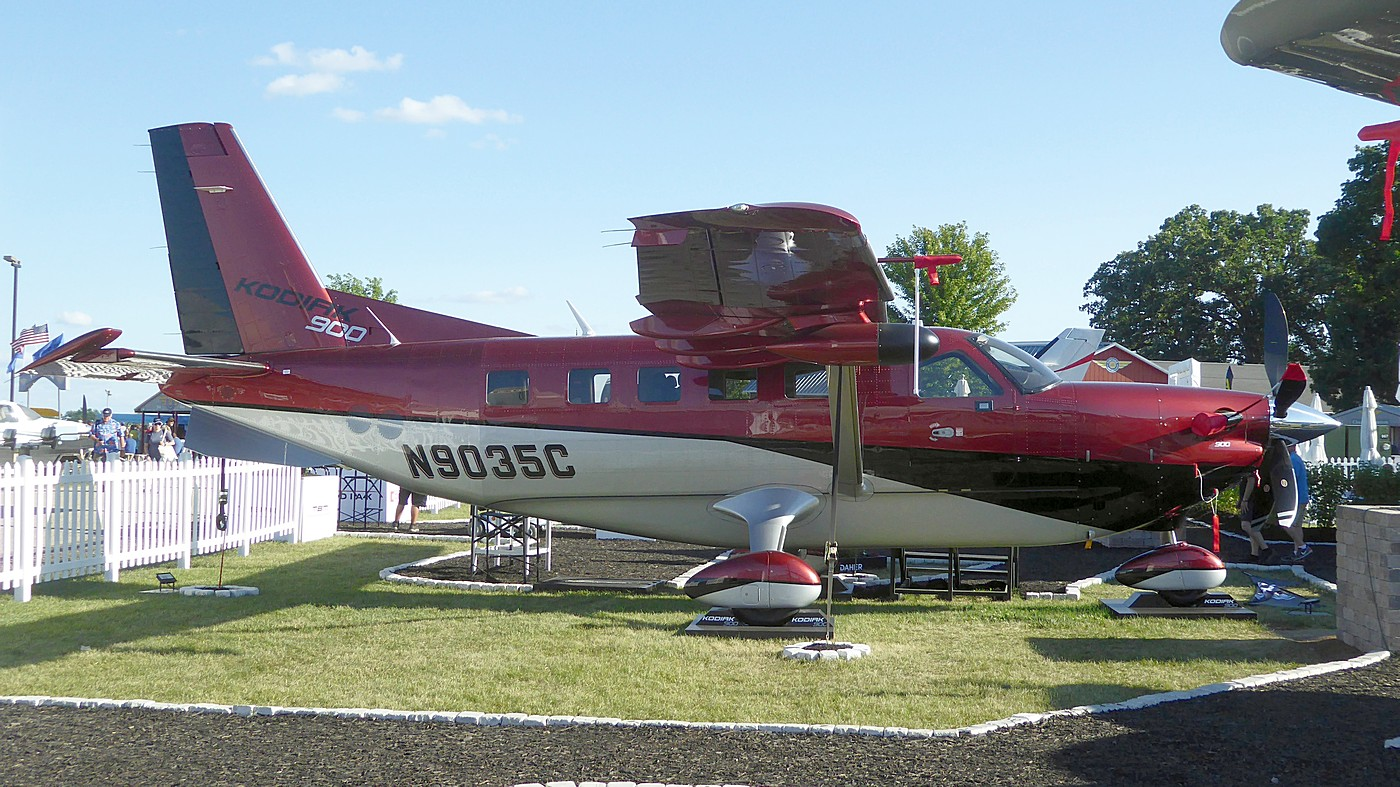
Daher Kodiak 900 N9035C at EAA AirVenture Oshkosh in July 2022.

Kodiak 900
Stretched variant of the Kodiak 100 Series III introduced at the 2022 EAA AirVenture at Oshkosh. The 900 features a 3.9-foot longer fuselage and is powered by a 900-shp Pratt & Whitney Canada PT6A-140A engine. Deliveries are expected to commence around January 2023. The Kodiak 900 will supplement the Kodiak 100 but not replace it.
Air Claw
A surveillance modification by Northrop Grumman with a FLIR Systems Star Safire sensor and a Persistent Surveillance Systems Hawkeye wide area sensor.

== Operators ==
The largest single order was announced on 15 November 2016 for 20 aircraft from Sky Trek, to be delivered within a year. Tokyo-based Sky Trek plans to begin air charter services in the first half of 2017 and is a start-up membership-based operator owned by Mitsui and Setouchi Holdings. Setouchi was the Quest dealer for Japan and purchased Quest Aircraft in 2015.

New Zealand based Glenorchy Air operates two Kodiak 100 aircraft on tourist flights around the Alpine region of the South Island

India's SpiceJet intends to buy 100 amphibious Kodiaks, a $400 million deal. It has applied for financial support from Narendra Modi as part of the national aviation expansion program UDAN (Ude Desh Ka Aam Naagrik, "Let Every Person Fly") for connecting its population by air, despite limited infrastructure. As only 3% of Indians travel by air, it is hoped that the Kodiak will stimulate air travel by operating from waterways and unimproved runways. The aircraft has been demonstrated as a landplane and seaplane demonstrations will happen next.

In November 2017, 220 Quest Kodiaks were flying worldwide as freighters, for skydiving and as business aircraft.

== Specifications ==
Data from Quest Aircraft

General characteristics

- Crew: 1
- Capacity: nine passengers
- Length: 34 ft 2 in (10.41 m)
- Wingspan: 45 ft 0 in (13.72 m)
- Height: 15 ft 3 in (4.65 m)
- Wing area: 240 sq ft (22 m^{2})
- Aspect ratio: 8.4
- Empty weight: 3,770 lb (1,710 kg)
- Max takeoff weight: 7,255 lb (3,291 kg)
- Powerplant: 1 × Pratt & Whitney Canada PT6A-34 turboprop, 750 shp (560 kW) takeoff power (700 shp (520 kW) continuous)
- Propellers: 4-bladed constant speed, feathering, reversible, 8 ft 0 in (2.44 m) diameter

Performance

- Cruise speed: 211 mph (339 km/h, 183 kn)
- Stall speed: 69 mph (110 km/h, 60 kn) (flaps down)
- Range: 1,303 mi (2,096 km, 1,132 nmi)
- Service ceiling: 25,000 ft (7,600 m)
- Rate of climb: 1,371 ft/min (6.96 m/s)
- Wing loading: 30.2 lb/sq ft (147 kg/m^{2})
- Take-off distance: 934 ft (285 m)
- Landing roll: 705 ft (215 m)

== See also ==
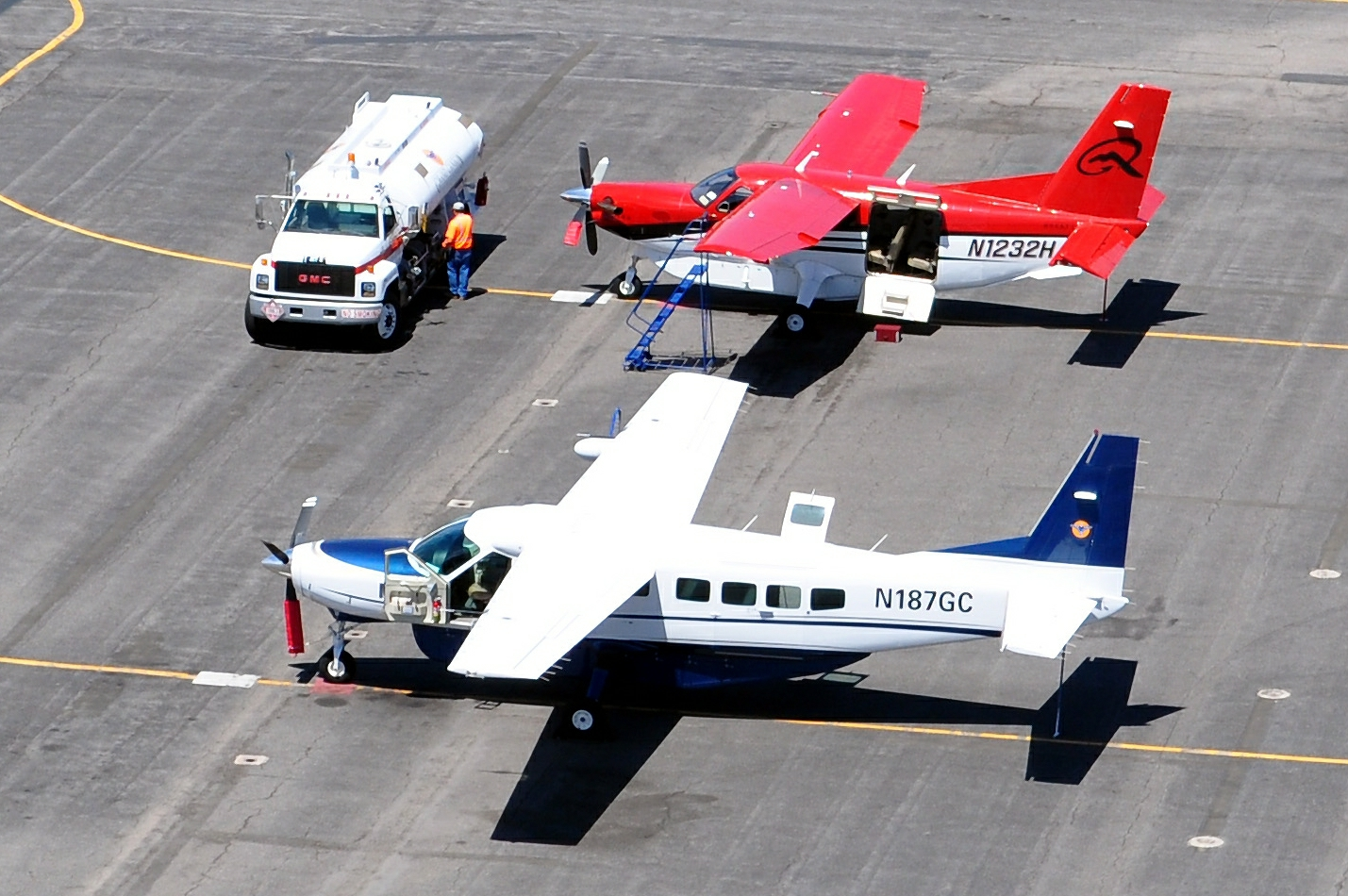
A Quest Kodiak (background) alongside a Cessna Grand Caravan on an airport apron

Aircraft of comparable role, configuration, and era

- Cessna 208 Caravan
- GippsAero GA10
- PAC P-750 XSTOL
