= Mooney 301 =

Type of aircraft

General information
- Type: Cabin monoplane
- National origin: United States
- Manufacturer: Mooney Aircraft Company
- Number built: 1

History
- First flight: 7 April 1983
- Developed into: SOCATA TBM

The Mooney 301 was a prototype aircraft created by American manufacturer Mooney Aircraft Company in 1983. It was a low-wing, single-engine, six-place monoplane with retractable landing gear and a pressurized fuselage.

The Mooney 301 design team was led by Roy LoPresti. It was an attempt to create an alternative to pressurized single-engine airplanes being introduced by Beechcraft, Cessna and Piper Aircraft. Only one prototype was constructed. Further development was carried out by a consortium led by French investors, eventually resulting in the SOCATA TBM.

== Development ==
The Mooney Aircraft Company had previously produced a single-engine pressurized aircraft in 1964 (the M22 Mustang), which had been a financial disaster and was probably the largest single factor in the company's 1969 bankruptcy (although the Mustang continued to be produced through 1970). By the late 1970s the company was again feeling pressure to offer a pressurized product; Cessna's pressurized 210 had been available for several years, and Piper and Beech had announced their own pressurized single-engine projects.

To avoid another M22-type disaster the LoPresti design team (he brought in his own engineers, rather than using Mooney company employees) chose to start with a new design rather than a rework of the existing models (i.e. the M20 and its various upgrades).

The 301's general configuration was similar to other Mooney models, differing in details such as an aft-sloping vertical fin, as opposed to the vertical leading edge with forward-swept trailing edge M20 fin, a lower-set engine with small cooling-air inlets, and fixed horizontal stabilizers with trim tab-equipped elevators, as opposed to the pivoting-empennage M20 design. The tapered wing planform was similar to the M20, slightly longer (37.0 feet vs. 36.42 feet for the M20), and with several differences: the airfoil was a low-drag 15% profile NASA NLF(1)-0315 from root to tip; double-slotted Fowler flaps covering 90% of the trailing-edge length, with slotted ailerons on the remaining 10%, and with spoilers mounted on the wing's upper surfaces ahead of the flaps to assist the ailerons.

The fuselage pressure vessel operated at 5.0 psig, which would provide an equivalent cabin pressure of slightly lower than 9000' MSL when operated at 25,000 MSL.

The 301's designation came from its projected top speed, 262 knots, or 301 miles per hour.

== Prototype ==
First flight of the prototype occurred on 21 April 1983. Some 70 hours of flight testing were accomplished on that unit during 1983. Production of the 301 had been scheduled to start in 1985 but Mooney suffered another financial crisis during that time: its majority owner, Republic Steel, was acquired by Ling-Temco-Vought in July 1984, and the new owners ordered Republic to divest itself of the Mooney Aircraft Company. The company was held for six weeks by a Minnesota-based investment company (The Morrison Company), then sold again to a French-based consortium led by Alec Couvelaire, a Paris-based Mooney dealer, and by Armand Rivard, the owner of Lake Aircraft.

The new owners decided the aircraft was too heavy (200 pounds over target) and too slow for the projected market (300 knots should be the target, according to the new owners). Couvelaire proposed a joint venture between Mooney Aircraft and the SOCATA Division of Aerospatiale. After several iterations (in which Mooney eventually dropped out), that venture resulted in the turboprop-powered TBM 700, in which the "M" stands for "Mooney".

The 301 prototype did not fly again after 1983. It rested in the Mooney Engineering Department for several years, then its wings were removed and the remainder was donated to an A & P school in Abilene, Texas.

== Specifications ==
Data from Airdata File: Mooney 301

General characteristics

- Crew: one
- Capacity: five passengers
- Length: 29 ft 9 1/4 in (9.074 m)
- Wingspan: 36 ft 9 in (11.20 m)
- Height: 9 ft 10 3/4 in (3.016 m)
- Wing area: 150.0 sq ft (13.94 m^{2})
- Airfoil: Mooney 0315
- Empty weight: 2,548 lb (1,156 kg)
- Gross weight: 4,000 lb (1,814 kg)
- Fuel capacity: 100 US gal (83 imp gal; 380 L)
- Powerplant: 1 × Avco Lycoming TIO-540 , 360 hp (270 kW)
- Propellers: 3-bladed constant-speed propeller, 6 ft 6 in (1.98 m) diameter

Performance

- Maximum speed: 301 mph (484 km/h, 262 kn)
- Cruise speed: 259 mph (417 km/h, 225 kn)
- Stall speed: 64 mph (103 km/h, 56 kn) (flaps down)
- Range: 1,149 mi (1,849 km, 998 nmi)
- Service ceiling: 25,000 ft (7,600 m)
- Rate of climb: 1,450 ft/min (7.4 m/s)
