= Daher =

French industrial conglomerate

- Type: Société anonyme with a board of directors (French public limited company)
- Industry: Aircraft manufacturing, manufacturing, industrial services and logistics
- Founded: 1863; 163 years ago
- Founder: Paul Daher
- Headquarters: Immeuble Belaïa-Cœur d’Orly, 7 avenue de l’Union, 94390 Orly, France
- Key people: Patrick Daher, Thibault Scaramanga (Chairman), Michel Denis (Chief Executive Officer); Aymeric Daher (Deputy Chief Executive Officer)
- Products: Aircraft, engines, aerostructures, valves, nuclear services, logistical services
- Revenue: ▲€1.9 billion (2025)
- Owner: CoreDaher (Daher family): 87.5%; Bpifrance: 12.5%
- Number of employees: 14,500 (2025)
- Subsidiaries: Daher Aerospace, Daher Logistics, Daher Transport, Daher Industrial Services, Daher Aircraft, Daher Business Support
- Website: www.daher.com

Daher (also stylized as DAHER) is a French industrial conglomerate. It is operational across the aerospace, defence, nuclear, and automotive industrial sectors in the fields of manufacturing, services, and transport.

It was founded in 1863 as a shipping company based in Marseille, France. Within its first decade of operation, it was taken over by the Daher family, who have held a controlling stake in the company for over 100 years.

During the twenty-first century, Daher has branched into the aviation industry, acquiring both French general aviation manufacturer SOCATA and American aircraft company Quest Aircraft. In addition to manufacturing its own light aircraft range, it is also active as a subcontractor of aerostructures on behalf of several aerospace firms, including Airbus, Boeing, Dassault, and Gulfstream Aerospace.

== History ==
=== Origins and development in industrial transport ===
Founded in Marseille in 1863 under the name Barban, the company was taken over by Paul Daher in 1898 and became "Daher & Cie".

Initially specialising in maritime transport and trading, the company subsequently expanded into the transportation of heavy equipment. In 1880, it transported a shipment of railway rails from Marseille to San Francisco aboard the Herald of Morning.

During the 20th century, the company participated in international infrastructure projects, including the construction of the first two major pipelines in the Middle East in 1921. In the 1930s, the company specialised in heavy maritime transport of railway, industrial and automotive equipment.

From 1974, the group contributed to France's civilian nuclear programme by providing heavy-lifting equipment at several nuclear power plant construction sites. During the 1980s, Daher expanded into industrial logistics for companies in the aerospace and energy sectors.

The company's activities during this period included transporting the front door of the Airbus Beluga in 1989, managing supplies for the Daya Bay nuclear power plant in China in 1990, and transporting equipment for the Omsk refinery in Siberia in 1994. During this period, the company expanded beyond maritime transport and cargo handling into industrial and logistics services.

=== Diversification of industrial activities ===
In the early 2000s, Daher expanded its business activities beyond logistics to include the manufacture of aircraft equipment and structures.

In 2009, the French Strategic Investment Fund (Fonds stratégique d'investissement, FSI) invested in Daher.

Daher acquired Socata, an EADS subsidiary originating from Morane-Saulnier, in 2009 and began manufacturing aircraft., In 2019, Daher acquired the American aircraft manufacturer Quest Aircraft.

In early October 2020, Daher announced that, following support from the French government during the COVID-19 crisis, the number of planned job cuts had been reduced. A total of 679 positions were eliminated amid expectations of a €300 million to €400 million reduction in revenue.

In 2023, Daher reorganised its activities around four business areas: aircraft, industry, industrial services and logistics. That same year, the acquisition of AAA (Assistance Aéronautique et Aérospatiale) expanded the group's industrial services activities in assembly and production support.

The group has also undertaken research and development activities involving advanced materials and aircraft technologies. It participated alongside Airbus and Safran in the EcoPulse programme, a hybrid-electric aircraft demonstrator. Daher has also conducted research into thermoplastic composites in partnership with the Luxembourg Institute of Science and Technology (LIST).^{,}

From the mid-2020s, Daher began developing activities in the defence and drone sectors. In 2025, the group presented EyePulse, a MALE (medium-altitude, long-endurance) drone demonstrator developed in collaboration with Thales and tested under initiatives supported by the French Defence Procurement Agency (Direction générale de l'armement, DGA).

== Business lines ==
=== Aircraft manufacturer ===
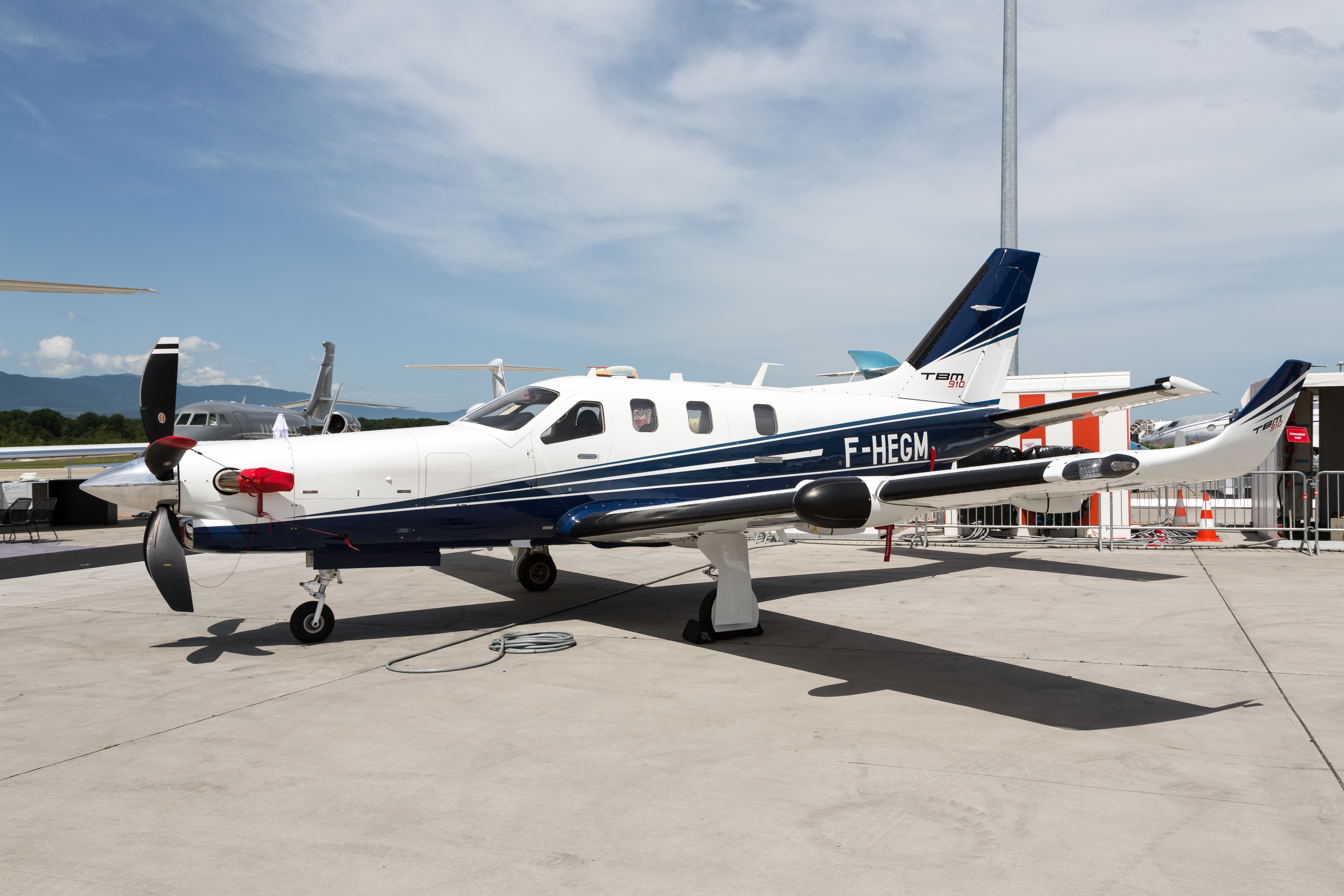
TBM-910

Daher's aviation activity includes the design, manufacture and maintenance of the TBM and Kodiak single-engine turboprop aircraft. In 2025, Daher delivered 76 aircraft across its TBM and Kodiak product lines, including 51 TBM 960 aircraft assembled in Tarbes, France, and 25 Kodiak aircraft produced in Sandpoint, Idaho. The year also marked the delivery of the 600th aircraft in the TBM 900 series. Daher also offers maintenance, repair and technical support of other aircraft in the same categories.

=== Aerospace systems & equipment ===
Daher designs and manufactures products for the aerospace market:

- Aero structures: Wings and empennages, doors, airframe, fairings
- Aero-Engines: Nacelles and pylons, engine parts
- Aircraft interiors: Floor covering, cargo nets, insulation blankets, air distribution systems.

== Ownership ==
The Daher family holds an 87.5% ownership stake in the group. Bpifrance holds a 12.5% stake and has been a shareholder since 2009, following an initial investment by the Strategic Investment Fund (FSI).

== Locations ==
Daher operates in 17 countries. In France, the group has a production facility in Tarbes and aeronautical logistics activities in the Toulouse region, a manufacturing site in Nantes, and industrial logistics operations for Airbus Helicopters in Marignane.

Internationally, the company is present in Europe (Germany, the United Kingdom and the Netherlands), North America (the United States and Mexico), Asia (notably India and China) and the Middle East.

In 2025, international operations accounted for 55% of the group's revenue.
