= Quest Aircraft =

American aircraft manufacturer

- Industry: Aerospace
- Founded: 2001
- Fate: Acquired by Daher in 2019
- Successor: Kodiak Aircraft Company (Daher)
- Headquarters: Sandpoint, Idaho, United States
- Products: General aviation aircraft
- Owner: Setouchi Holdings (2015-19)
- Number of employees: 184 (2015)

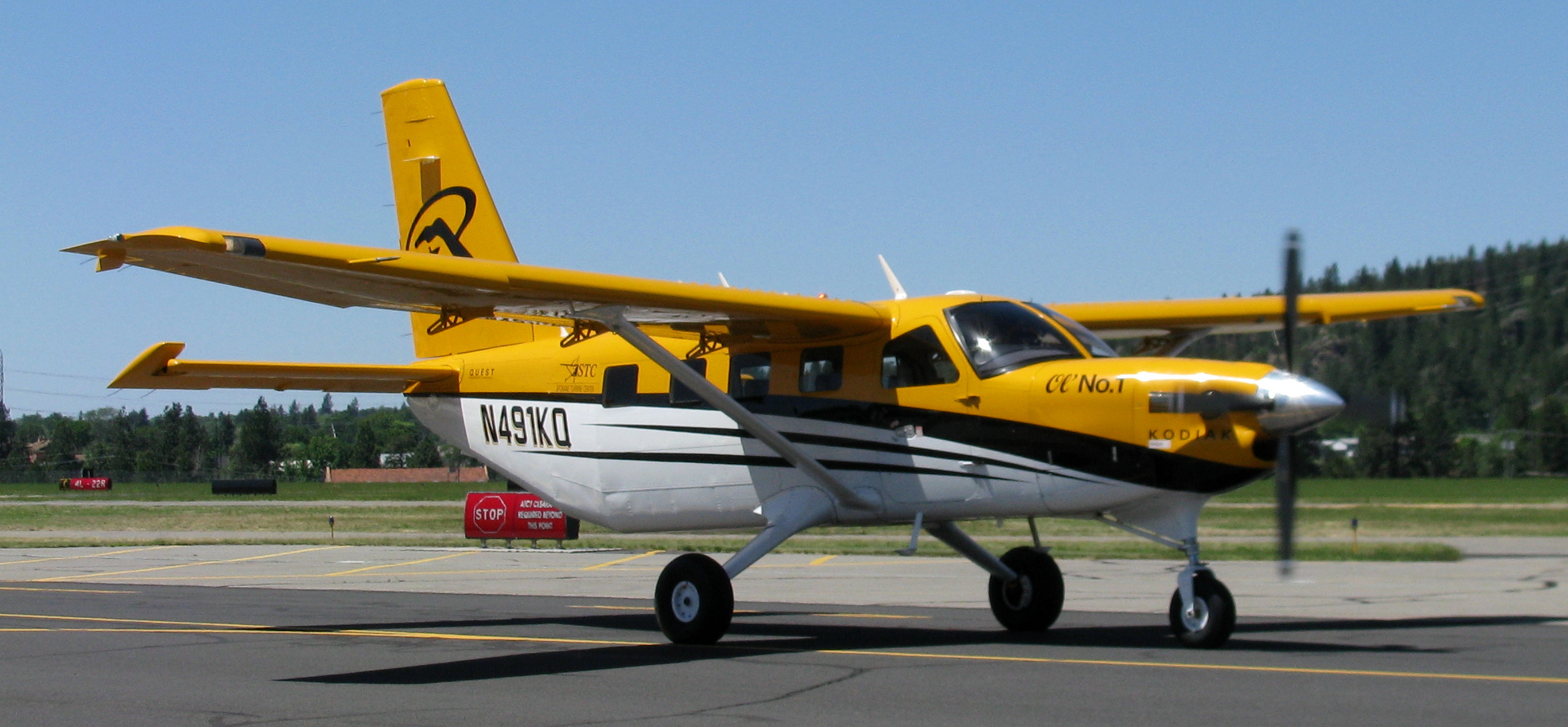
Quest Kodiak

The Quest Aircraft Company was an American aircraft manufacturer located in Sandpoint, Idaho. Quest was started in 2001 to design and provide aircraft suitable for humanitarian applications. Its sole product was the Kodiak single engine short takeoff and landing (STOL) aircraft.

In February 2015, the company was sold to Setouchi Holdings of Japan. Setouchi had been acting as a dealer for Quest before purchasing the company. In 2019, Quest was sold to the French industrial group Daher.

== History ==
In 1998, the Idaho Air Group was founded by Tom Hamilton and David Voetmann. Hamilton and Voetmann saw a need to develop an aircraft uniquely suited to the rugged flying environment found in humanitarian aviation. After raising the necessary funding, the Quest Aircraft Company launched in 2001 with a staff of 14. After a 27,000-square-foot (2,500 m^{2}) facility was prepared in 2002, work started on the first prototype aircraft, later leading to the production of the Quest Kodiak.

Paul Schaller became CEO of the company in 2004, and by 2009 the employment force was 340 people.

In 2010 the workforce was reduced to 155 employees, but 2011 saw infusion of capital and a change in executive leadership, with Schaller migrating to a consulting role in the company.

Sam Hill was the CEO from 2012 to January 2017, after previous experience at Embraer Aircraft Corporation and Honda Aircraft Company.

In February 2015, the company was purchased by Setouchi Holdings, part of the Tsuneishi Group of Japan.

In June 2016, the company's headquarters were expanded, bringing the main facility to 110,000 sq ft (10,000 m^{2}). A 5,000 sq ft (460 m^{2}) research and development hangar was also completed.

In January 2017, Robert H. Wells was named CEO, having been in management at Tag Aviation, Beechcraft and Landmark Aviation.

On June 13, 2019, French industrial conglomerate Daher announced its acquisition of Quest Aircraft from Setouchi Holdings. The deal was completed by October 1, 2019, after which Quest was renamed Kodiak Aircraft and then absorbed into the parent company.

== Products ==
- Quest Kodiak

== See also ==
- List of companies based in Idaho
