= FAA Industry Training Standards =

FITS - Federal Aviation Administration Industry Training Standards program is a partnership between FAA, Industry, and Academia designed to enhance general aviation safety.

FITS is focused on the redesign of general aviation training. Instead of training pilots to pass practical tests, FITS focuses on expertly manage real-world challenges. Scenario based training is used to enhance the GA pilots' aeronautical decision making, risk management, and single pilot resource management skills. We do this without compromising basic stick and rudder skills.
