= Leduc RL.12 =

Leduc RL-12

General information
- Type: Club sport single-seater
- National origin: France
- Designer: René Leduc
- Number built: 1

History
- First flight: 2 July 1939

The Leduc RL-12 was a French low power, economical, parasol wing, single seat aircraft. First flown in July 1939, its development was halted by World War II.

== Design ==
René Leduc, who shared his name with the producer of post-war French ramjet aircraft, was an amateur aircraft builder and, in the 1930s, was chief test pilot at the Nantes aero-club. His earliest design, a glider designated RL.1, flew in 1928. Design work on the RL.12 began in 1934, construction started the following year and the first flight was made on 2 July 1939.

The RL.12 was a parasol wing monoplane; its wing was unswept, without dihedral and with constant chord out to blunt tips. It was built in three parts, a small, almost square centre-section and two long outer panels. Structurally, it had two spruce and plywood box spars on each side with ply skin around the leading edge from the forward spar forming a torsion-resistant D-box and was fabric covered behind. The centre section was attached to the fuselage with three cabane struts on each side, a parallel pair from the upper fuselage longeron and a backward-leaning one from the rear of the engine. These were dural tubes encased in balsa streamlining, with a fabric outer layer. Each outer panel had a streamlined V-strut from the lower fuselage longeron to the spars a little beyond mid-span. Ailerons occupied half the span. A panel in the centre-section aft of the rear spar allowed the wings to be folded for transportation.

Its flat-sided, round-decked fuselage was built around four spruce longerons. The front half, which included the engine and open cockpit, was dural skinned and the rear fabric covered. A 18 kW (24 hp), flat-four Ava 4A-00 engine was mounted in the nose with its cylinder heads exposed for cooling. The pilot sat under mid-wing with a raised rear fuselage fairing providing a headrest. At the rear a constant chord, round tipped, cantilever tailplane mounted on top of the fuselage carried similarly shaped elevators. The fin was almost triangular and carried a straight-edged rudder which extended to the keel, working in a nick between the elevators.

The RL.12 had fixed, tailskid landing gear with a track of 2.30 m (7 ft 7 in). Each faired mainwheel was on a V-strut bent to the horizontal near its apex and hinged on the lower fuselage; another strut, with a bungee cord shock-absorber mounted near the wheel, was attached to the upper fuselage. These struts were a mixture of dural and steel tubes, streamlined in the same way as the cabane struts.

== Development ==
The first flight of the RL.12 was on 2 July 1939, when it was flown by its designer for about fifteen minutes. As it handled and landed well, Leduc decided to demonstrate it to his fellow members of the Nantes club. In front of around two hundred people, he took off in 30 m (98 ft) and completed a "very remarkable" display with a landing roll of only 3 m (10 ft) into a 10–15 km/h (6–9 mph; 5–8 kn) wind.

These two flights showed that some engine tuning was needed to reach full rpm. That done, trials continued at least into late August; soon after, France was at war.

== Specifications ==
Data from Les Ailes August 1939

General characteristics

- Crew: One
- Length: 6.98 m (22 ft 11 in)
- Wingspan: 10.80 m (35 ft 5 in)
- Wing area: 14.50 m^{2} (156.1 sq ft)
- Aspect ratio: 8
- Airfoil: NACA 23012
- Empty weight: 166 kg (366 lb)
- Gross weight: 280 kg (617 lb)
- Fuel capacity: fuel and oil, 30 kg (66 lb)
- Powerplant: 1 × Ava 4A-00 flat-four, 20 kW (27 hp)
- Propellers: 2-bladed Chauvière, 1.65 m (5 ft 5 in) diameter wood

Performance

- Maximum speed: 122 km/h (76 mph, 66 kn)
- Cruise speed: 100 km/h (62 mph, 54 kn) economical
- Minimum control speed: 48 km/h (30 mph, 26 kn)
- Service ceiling: 5,800 m (19,000 ft)
- Take-off distance: 45 m (148 ft), no wind
- Landing distance: 15 m (49 ft) at 35 km/h (22 mph; 19 kn)
