= Breguet Colibri =

French monoplane

Colibri

General information
- Type: Ultralight aircraft
- National origin: France
- Manufacturer: Louis Breguet
- Number built: 1

History
- First flight: Spring 1923

The Breguet Colibri was a low power, single seat French monoplane designed to compete in a 1923 newspaper-sponsored contest between such aircraft. Only one was built.

== Design and development ==
In 1923 the French newspaper Petit Parisien organised a contest for low-powered aircraft, called the Grand-Prix de la Moto-Aviette. It attracted nineteen entries and began on Sunday 15 July at Buc, Yvelines. The Breguet Colibri (Hummingbird) was one participant, remarked on initially because it showed an interest in this category from an established manufacturer.

It was a high, braced-wing monoplane of mixed construction. The largely wooden wing was trapezoidal in plan out to rounded tips, tapering slightly in thickness outward and built around two wooden spars. It was braced from below with V-struts from the spars at about one-third span to the lower fuselage. Broad ailerons filled the outer halves of the trailing edges out to the tips.

the first choice of engine for the Colibri was a water-cooled, twin-cylinder, 509 cc (31.1 cu in), 10 hp (7.5 kW) Renault but this was not ready for the Grand-Prix. Instead Breguet used an air-cooled, 750 cc (46 cu in), four-cylinder, upright inline Sergant A, which produced 16 hp (12 kW) at 3,200 rpm. This was mounted in the upper nose under a narrow, dural cowling and drove a two-blade propeller.

The fuselage of the Colibri was almost rectangular in section, with tubular duralumin longerons and frames which slightly rounded its canvas covering. Its top and underside were flat and met at a wide horizontal knife-edge below the engine. The pilot's cockpit was just behind the wing leading edge, with a faired headrest behind it. At the rear the dural-framed horizontal tail was mounted on top of the fuselage and was almost semi-circular in plan, with a ground-adjustable tailplane and unbalanced elevators. The vertical tail had an irregular, blunted quadrilateral profile and its rudder, which worked in a gap between the elevators, was also unbalanced.

The Colibri had a very simple tailskid undercarriage with its thin-tyred mainwheels on an axle elastically mounted from the lower longerons, inset into the deep fuselage sides and centred just below its underside. Its track was only about 790 mm (31 in).

== Operational history ==
The precise date of the Colibri's first flight is not known, but in May 1923 it was referred to as a "recent production " of Avions Breguet.

The Grand Prix at Buc was won by a Farman Moustique monoplane, with a Dewoitine in second place. As well as take-off and landing tests there was a race over 300 km (190 mi), flown in thirty laps. The Colibri was in second or third place during the first three laps but dropped out during the fourth.

It continued to fly with the Sergant engine into 1924; that January it took part in a meeting at Nimes. There is no known evidence that the Renault was ever fitted.

== Specifications (Renault engine) ==
Data from l'Aéronautique, July 1923

General characteristics

- Crew: One
- Length: 6.10 m (20 ft 0 in)
- Wingspan: 10.40 m (34 ft 1 in)
- Height: 1.54 m (5 ft 1 in)
- Wing area: 15 m^{2} (160 sq ft)
- Empty weight: 98 kg (216 lb)
- Gross weight: 188 kg (414 lb)
- Fuel capacity: 25 L (5.5 imp gal; 6.6 US gal)
- Powerplant: 1 × Renault water-cooled 2-cylinder inline, 7.5 kW (10 hp)
- Propellers: 2-bladed Breguet
