= Dart Pup =

Pup
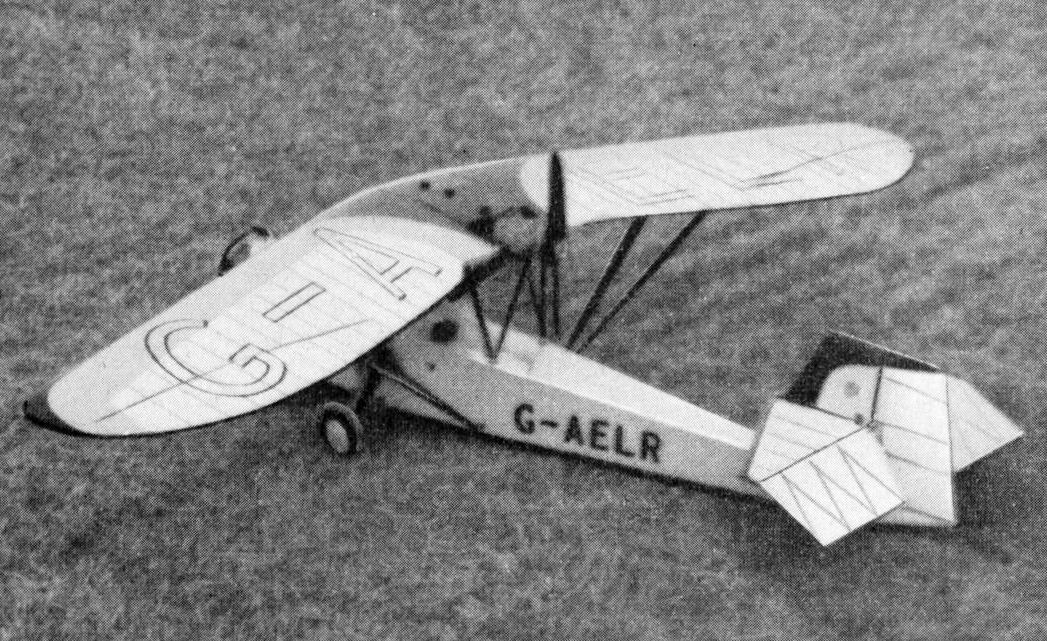

General information
- Type: Single-seat ultralight monoplane
- National origin: United Kingdom
- Manufacturer: Zander and Weyl; Dart Aircraft
- Designer: A.R. Weyl
- Number built: 1

History
- First flight: 1936

The Dart Pup (originally the Dunstable Dart) was a British single-seat ultralight monoplane designed and built by Zander and Weyl (later Dart Aircraft) at Dunstable, Bedfordshire.

== Development ==
The Pup was a single-seat parasol wing monoplane with an Ava flat-four pusher engine mounted on the wing trailing edge. The wings could be folded back for storage. The Pup registered G-AELR first flew in July 1936.

In 1937 the Pup was fitted with a 36 hp (27 kW) Bristol Cherub engine, a taller landing gear and a modified rudder. In August 1938 it crashed and was destroyed on takeoff.

== Specifications (Ava-powered) ==
Data from

General characteristics

- Crew: 1
- Length: 19 ft 8.5 in (6.01 m)
- Wingspan: 29 ft 7.5 in (9.03 m)
- Wing area: 114 sq ft (10.59 m^{2})
- Empty weight: 485 lb (220 kg)
- Gross weight: 705 lb (320 kg)
- Powerplant: 1 × Ava 4A-00 flat-four piston engine , 27 hp (20 kW)

Performance

- Maximum speed: 75 mph (121 km/h, 65 kn)
- Cruise speed: 62 mph (100 km/h, 54 kn)
