= Peyret Avionette =

1920s French light aircraft

Avionette

General information
- Type: Ultralight aircraft
- National origin: France
- Manufacturer: Louis Peyret
- Designer: Louis Peyret
- Number built: 1

History
- First flight: c. July 1923

The Peyret Avionette was a low power, single seat French monoplane which won several first-place prizes at the Congrès Experimental contest of 1923.

== Design ==
The Peyret was a high, braced wing monoplane. Its two-piece wing was rectangular in plan apart from slightly angled tips; each part was built around two duralumin tube spars. The half-wings were braced by pairs of near-parallel struts from the lower fuselage longerons to the wing spars at about 60% span. Their full span ailerons had a constant chord of 370 mm (15 in).

The Avionette was powered by an air-cooled, 750 cc (46 cu in), four-cylinder, upright inline Sergant A engine, which was geared down to produce 16 hp (12 kW) at 3,200 rpm. It was enclosed in a duralumin cowling. Behind the engine the fuselage had a rectangular section, formed by four longerons connected with frames, and was plywood covered. Its open cockpit was over the wing at mid-chord; a photo shows a streamlined headrest. At the rear the fin was triangular and an integral part of the fuselage. It carried a roughly trapezoidal rudder working in a cut-out in the one-piece elevator, which was similar in plan to the wing and hinged behind its leading edge to provide aerodynamic balancing. The control surfaces were deliberately large, to allow the Avionette to be flown as a glider.

The Peyret had fixed tailskid landing gear with its mainwheels and associated bungee shock absorbers on a single, steel tube axle mounted on V-struts, wire cross-braced to each other, from the lower longerons.

== Operational history ==
The Peyret Avionette was designed to compete in the July 1923 contest for low-powered aircraft, organised by the French newspaper Petit Parisien and called the Grand-Prix de la Moto-Aviette. Unfortunately its completion was delayed and it missed that competition.

It was flying by the start of August and took part in the Congrès Experimental in Vauville, Manche, piloted by Maneyrol. He was very successful, setting a new class world altitude record of 3,890 m (12,760 ft), attained in 52 min. He also won the competition speed test over 30 km (19 mi) at 90.8 km/h (56.4 mph; 49.0 kn) and used the least fuel 675 cm^{3} (41.2 cu in) over the same distance. In all, the prize money came to 11,000 fr and the Prix du President de la République was awarded to Louis Peyret, whose Peyret Tandem had been placed second in the glider duration competition.

The Avionette also travelled to the UK in October 1923 for the first Lympne light aircraft trials, though it was not amongst the prize-winners.

== Specifications ==
Data from Les Ailes, September 1923

General characteristics

- Crew: One
- Length: 5.57 m (18 ft 3 in)
- Wingspan: 9.85 m (32 ft 4 in)
- Height: 1.90 m (6 ft 3 in)
- Wing area: 15.30 m^{2} (164.7 sq ft)
- Empty weight: 150 kg (331 lb)
- Gross weight: 240 kg (529 lb)
- Powerplant: 1 × Sergant A air-cooled 750 cc (46 cu in) 4-cylinder inline, 12 kW (16 hp) at 3,200 rpm
- Propellers: 2-bladed Lumière, 1.75 m (5 ft 9 in) diameter

Performance

- Maximum speed: 100 km/h (62 mph, 54 kn)
- Stall speed: 35–40 km/h (22–25 mph, 19–22 kn)
- Service ceiling: 4,000 m (13,000 ft)
