= Dart Aircraft =

British aircraft manufacturer during the 1930s

Dart Aircraft Limited was a British aircraft manufacturer during the 1930s. Its facilities were located at 29 High Street North, Dunstable, Bedfordshire.

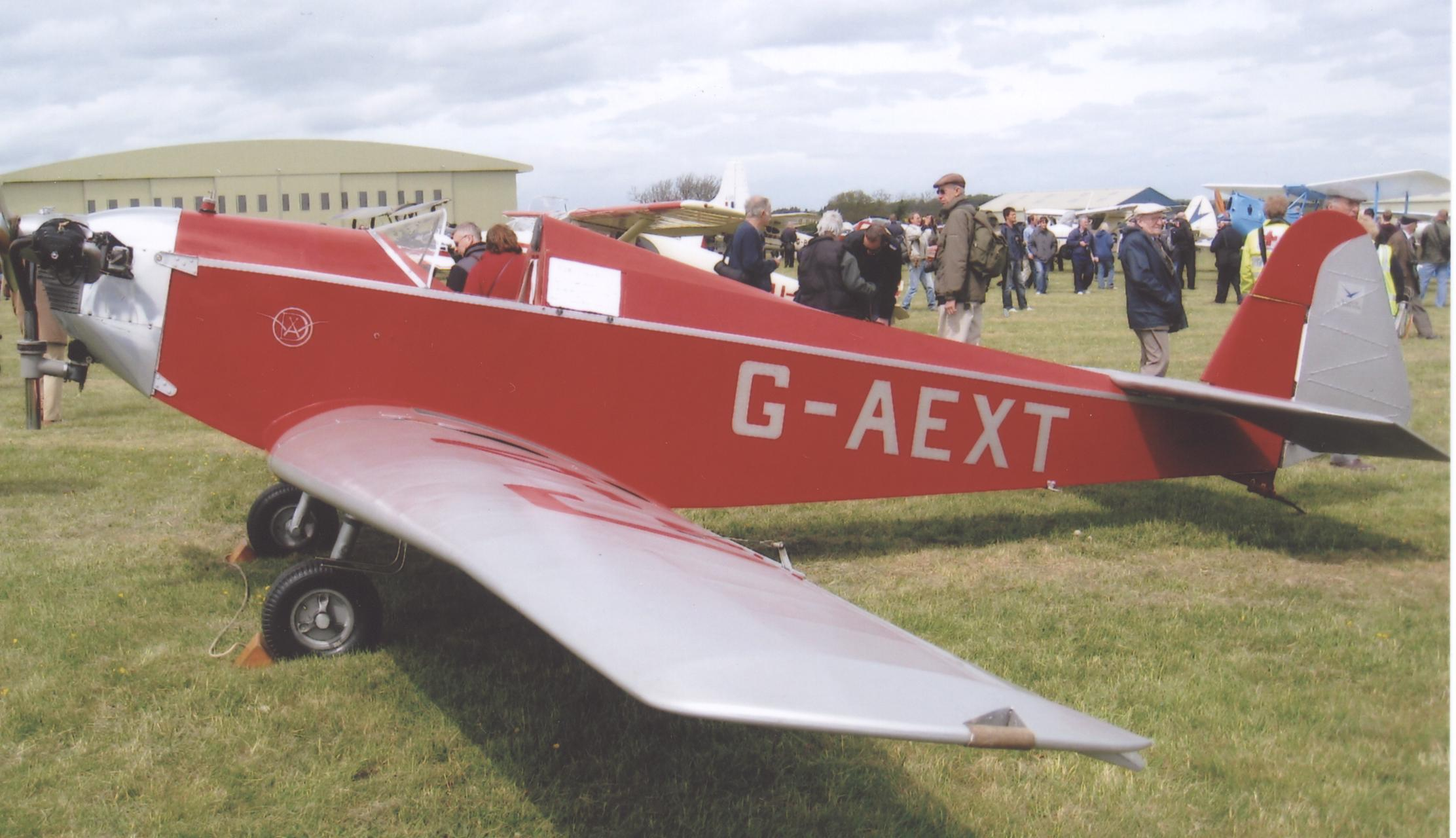
The 1937-built Dart Kitten II visiting the Kemble (Glos) air rally in May 2009

== History ==
The company was founded by Alfred R.Weyl and Erich P.Zander, as Zander and Weyl Limited at Dunstable. In March 1936 the company name was changed to Dart Aircraft Limited. The company began by constructing gliders, and also constructed replicas of several historic aircraft including in 1937 a replica of the Blériot cross-channel aircraft.

Alfred Richard Oscar Weyl, A.F.RAe.S., A.F.I.A.S., F.B.I.S., died on 23 February 1959. Born in Berlin 1898, he came to the UK in 1935 and acquired British nationality. In Germany he had held a number of responsible technical posts following active service in the Royal Prussian Air Corps in the First World War. He was a senior staff officer in the D.V.L. (Research Institute for Aeronautics) and was subsequently principal assistant to the professor of the aeronautical engineering department at Berlin university. At other periods he was in charge of special projects and did a considerable amount of test flying of prototypes. After the war he turned to design work and was responsible for a light sporting monoplane built by Udet-Flugzeugbau at Munich (later the Messerschmitt works). Soon after coming to England he founded the firm of Zander & Weyl in partnership with E. P. Zander. Later, as Dart Aircraft Ltd., the company produced the ultra-light Dart Kitten. Alfred Weyl was also an authority on armament (on which subject he contributed some important articles to Flight) and self-sealing fuel tanks, and his researches included tailless aircraft development, guided-missile design and aircraft plastics technology.(FLIGHT, 6 March 1959)

== Post war ==
In 1946 E P Zander and H E Bolton founded the Hawkridge Aircraft Company, as a two-man business with a workshop for glider manufacture and maintenance in the main street of Dunstable, UK (northwest of London) to develop the Venture Glider prototype. Bolton, who had a lifelong interest in gliding, was referred to at the time as "one of the best engineers of his field". Venture BGA-640 (later BGA-688), registered G-ALMF, flew at Dunstable the following year (1947). The Venture was Hawkridge’s only design, but they also produced five Dagling primary gliders, two Grunau Babies, and a converted Slingsby Gull 3 which they called the Hawkridge Kittiwake. The Dunstable factory closed in 1950, and work carried on at Denham (London) for two years before the company dissolved and its founders went their separate ways.

== Aircraft ==
- The first aircraft produced by Zander & Weyl was a cancelled Zögling primary glider, built for the Cambridge University Gliding Club in February 1935. This was followed by a Grunau Baby.
- The Zander & Weyl Cambridge, a single-seat sailplane similar to the German Grunau Baby
- The Dart Totternhoe was a secondary glider designed by Mr J Keeble and similar to the Slingsby Kirby Kadet.
- A replica Cayley glider, Lilienthal monoplane and biplane types, and a Wright 1902 glider, were built in 1935 for the Alexander Korda film "Conquest of the Air".

By 1936 the company had begun designing and constructing light single-engine aircraft:

- The Dunstable Dart (renamed Dart Pup when the company name was changed). The Dart was a light aircraft built in 1936; only one example was built. The aircraft was destroyed in a 1938 crash.
- Dart Flittermouse (1936), a single-seat ultralight monoplane
- The Dart Kitten, another single-seat ultralight, a low-wing single-seater intended for the private owner and for the solo training of pupils with a few hours to their credit. . The Kitten I first flew in 1937. An Ava engine of 25 h.p. was specified, giving an estimated top speed of 87 m.p.h. The span, length and wing area are 31 ft. 9 in., 21 ft. and 130 sq. ft. At an all-up weight of 682 lb., the wing loading is 5.25 Ib./sq.ft.
- The Kitten II (G-AEXT) was also first flown in 1937.
- The Kitten III was built in 1951
- A fourth Kitten was home-built in Australia in the 1960s.
- The Dart Weasel was a trainer designed for an RAF competition but evidently not built
