= Dart Flittermouse =

British ultralight aircraft

Flittermouse

General information
- Type: Single-seat ultralight
- National origin: United Kingdom
- Manufacturer: Dart Aircraft
- Designer: A R Weyl
- Status: Scrapped
- Number built: 1

History
- First flight: 1936
- Retired: 1951

The Dart Flittermouse is a British single-seat ultralight designed by A R Weyl and built by Dart Aircraft Limited at Dunstable, England.

== Design and development ==
The Flittermouse was a high-wing braced pusher monoplane powered by a 25 hp Scott Squirrel piston engine with a pusher propeller. An open frame carried the tail unit. One aircraft was built and registered G-AELZ.

In 1938 the rear skid was removed and the main landing gear moved back and a castoring nose wheel was fitted. After a number of private owners it was scrapped at Blackbushe Airport in 1951.

== Specifications ==
Data from British Civil Aircraft since 1919 Volume 1

General characteristics

- Crew: 1
- Length: 22 ft 6 in (6.86 m)
- Wingspan: 40 ft 6 in (12.35 m)
- Gross weight: 640 lb (290 kg)
- Powerplant: 1 × Scott Squirrel , 25 hp (19 kW)

Performance

- Maximum speed: 64 mph (103 km/h, 56 kn)
