= Dart Kitten =

1930s British ultra-light aircraft

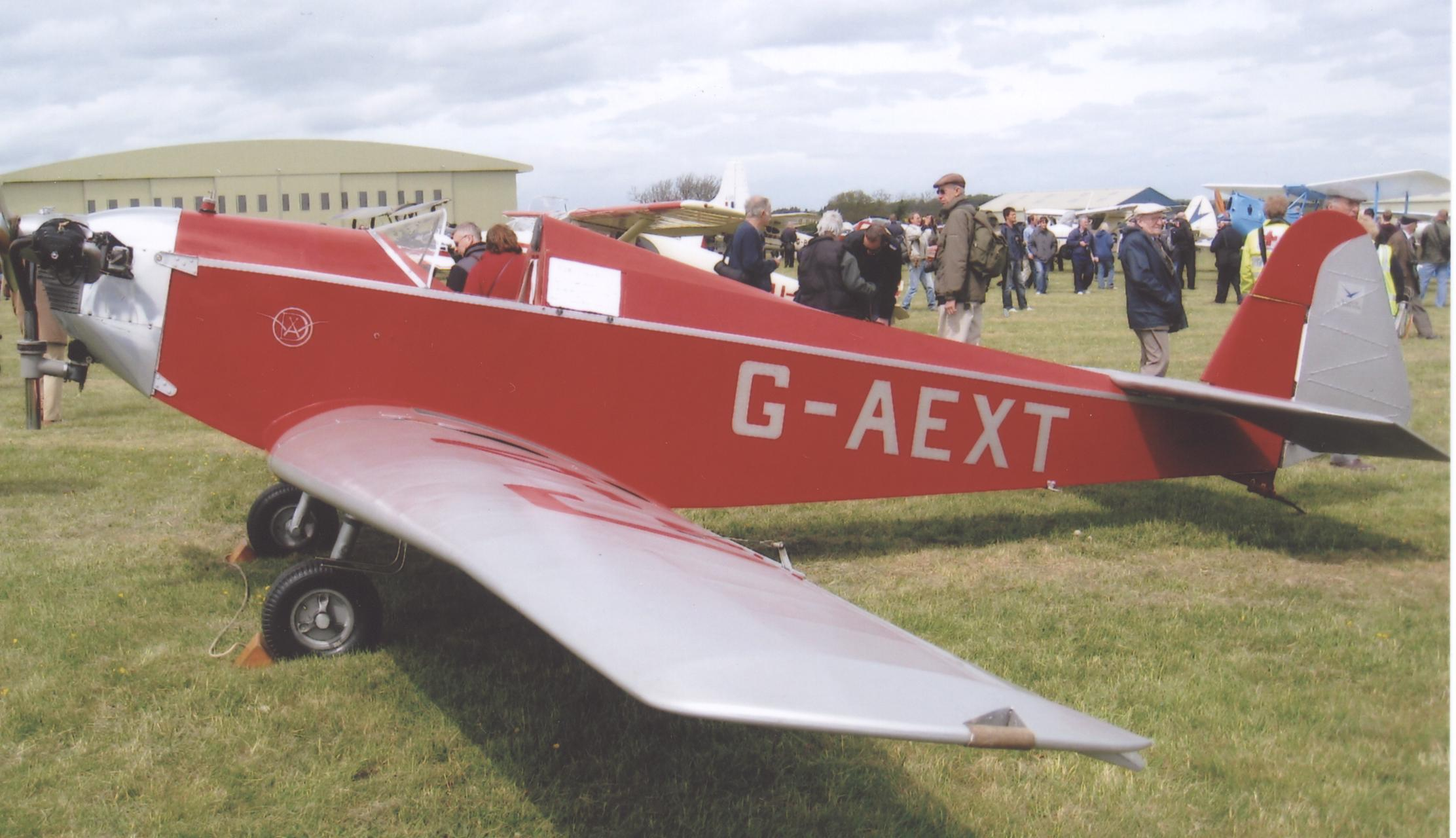
- The 1937-built Dart Kitten II visiting the Kemble (Glos) air rally in May 2009

General information
- Type: ultra-light aircraft
- National origin: United Kingdom
- Manufacturer: Dart Aircraft Ltd
- Designer: A.R. Weyl
- Status: Dart Kitten II airworthy in 2009
- Primary user: private owner pilots
- Number built: 4

History
- First flight: 15 January 1937

The Dart Kitten was a British-built ultra-light aircraft of the 1930s.

== Design and development ==
The Dart Kitten was designed by A.R. Weyl in 1936 and built by Dart Aircraft Ltd at Dunstable, Bedfordshire. It is an ultra-light single-seat low-wing aircraft with a fixed tailskid undercarriage. The four examples built were powered by a variety of engines of between 27 h.p. and 40 h.p.

== Operational history ==
The Dart Kitten I G-AERP first flew in January 1937 and was sold to a private owner at Tollerton airport near Nottingham. It was stored during the Second World War. It was re-engined with a 40 h.p. J.A.P. J-99 postwar and flew with a private owner at Broxbourne airfield Hertfordshire before crashing there in November 1952.

The Dart Kitten II G-AEXT received its authorisation to fly on 30 April 1937 and had a series of owners before being badly damaged in a crash at Willingale, Essex in November 1964. It was subsequently rebuilt and in 2009 was airworthy with a private owner near Aylesbury Buckinghamshire. As of 2023 it is based with the Real Aeroplane Company at Breighton near Selby in North Yorkshire.

The Dart Kitten III G-AMJP was built by Dart Aircraft in January 1952 and was flown by owners in Buckinghamshire, Wiltshire and Lincolnshire before being lost in a crash near Kings Lynn in June 1966.

A fourth Kitten was home-built at Port Moresby New Guinea in 1960 and registered in Australia as VH-WGL.

== Variants ==
Kitten I
27 h.p. Ava 4A-00 flat four engine;
Kitten II
36 h.p. Aeronca-J.A.P. J-99 engine, revised rear decking and simplified undercarriage;
Kitten III
as Kitten II but with wheel brakes.

== Specifications (Kitten III) ==
Data from Green, 1965, p. 150

General characteristics

- Crew: 1
- Capacity: 1
- Length: 21 ft 4 in (6.50 m)
- Wingspan: 31 ft 9 in (9.68 m)
- Height: 7 ft 11 in (2.41 m)
- Wing area: 130 sq ft (12 m^{2})
- Empty weight: 582 lb (264 kg)
- Gross weight: 860 lb (390 kg)
- Powerplant: 1 × Aeronca-J.A.P. J-99 two-cylinder air-cooled , 40 hp (30 kW)

Performance

- Maximum speed: 95 mph (153 km/h, 83 kn)
- Cruise speed: 83 mph (134 km/h, 72 kn)
- Range: 340 mi (550 km, 300 nmi)
- Service ceiling: 19,700 ft (6,000 m)
