= Sergant A =

1920s French piston aircraft engine

- Type: 4-cylinder, air-cooled, upright inline piston engine
- National origin: France
- Manufacturer: Sergant
- Designer: Sergant

The Sergant A was a French 4-cylinder, air-cooled, upright inline piston engine with a maximum output of 7.5 kW (10 hp), designed to meet the needs of the very small and light single seat sports aircraft of the early 1920s. It was used by at least ten different types.

== Design and development ==
In both the UK and France in the early 1920s there was a wish to make civilian flying more affordable, both in capital outlay and in running costs. This led to a need for low power engines. In Britain there were suitable engines like the Bristol Cherub but French designers were largely forced to import engines, either from the UK or Italy. The Sergant A was intended to provide a native product.

It was on display at the November 1923 Paris Salon and struck Flight's reporter as "extremely interesting" and car-engine like in its four-cylinder inline arrangement, a little heavy but reliable. It was unusual in its high maximum crankshaft speed of 3,200 rpm and the availability of a choice of reduction gear ratios.

== Operational history ==
The date of first running is not known but it appeared, and was widely used by a variety of aircraft and in several contests during 1923, with more in 1924.

== Applications ==
- Breguet Colibri
- Carley C.12
- Carmier-Simplex 10 hp
- Farman Moustique
- Gambier-SABCA
- Peyret Avionette
- Peyret-le Prieur Hydroplan
- Poncelet Castar
- Poncelet Vivette
- SABCA-Jullien SJ-1A

== Specifications ==
Data from Les Ailes, August 1923; Flight, February 1924

=== General characteristics ===
- Type: 4-cylinder, air-cooled, upright inline piston engine
- Bore: 55.5 mm (2.19 in)
- Stroke: 80 mm (3.1 in)
- Displacement: 750 cm^{3} (46 cu in)
- Length: 776 mm (30.6 in)
- Width: 340 mm (13 in)
- Height: 565 mm (22.2 in)
- Dry weight: 46 kg (101 lb) including carburettor and magneto

=== Components ===
- Valvetrain: cylinder head valves operated by rocker arms driven via pushrods from a camshaft in aluminium crankcase
- Fuel system: Zenith carburettor, single Scintilla magneto
- Fuel type: petrol
- Oil system: 5 hrs oil in aluminium crankcase, delivered by pressure pump
- Cooling system: air, directed from a forward scoop around cylinders and vertical fins
- Reduction gear: Choice of three reduction gear ratios: 14/35, 15/34 and 16/33
- Crankshaft: 3-bearing, silicon-manganese steel forging

=== Performance ===
- Power output: 12 kW (16 hp) at 3,200 rpm crankshaft speed
- Power-to-weight ratio: 0.26 kW/kg (0.16 hp/lb)
