= SFAN II =

1930s French aircraft

General information
- Type: Ultralight aircraft
- National origin: France
- Manufacturer: SFAN

History
- First flight: 1935

The SFAN II was a French motorglider built in the mid-1930s.

== Specifications ==
Data from J2mcL Planeurs, Aviafrance : S.F.A.N. II

General characteristics

- Crew: 1
- Length: 6.72 m (22 ft 1 in)
- Wingspan: 12 m (39 ft 4 in)
- Height: 2.27 m (7 ft 5 in)
- Wing area: 16.5 m^{2} (178 sq ft)
- Empty weight: 200 kg (441 lb)
- Max takeoff weight: 315 kg (694 lb)
- Powerplant: 1 × Ava 4A-00 4-cylinder air-cooled horizontally-opposed piston engine, 19 kW (25 hp)
- Propellers: 2-bladed fixed-pitch propeller

Performance

- Maximum speed: 115 km/h (71 mph, 62 kn)
- Wing loading: 19.1 kg/m^{2} (3.9 lb/sq ft)

== See also ==
Related development

- Kronfeld Monoplane
