= Carmier-Simplex 10 hp =

General information
- Type: Tailless sports aircraft
- National origin: France
- Manufacturer: La socièté à "L'avion Simplex"
- Designer: Pierre Carmier
- Number built: 1

History
- First flight: First half of 1923

The Carmier Simplex 10 hp was a French tailless, low power, single seat aircraft built in 1923 for a contest arranged by a Paris newspaper. Only one is known to have been completed and its career was brief.

== Design and development ==
Before World War I René Arnoux designed and built a series of about five tailless aircraft, all but the first being rectangular plan monoplanes with vertical surfaces. None was successful. In the early 1920s he continued to explore this layout, though with a changed planform, with a company he had founded that had Pierre Carmier as chair and principal designer called La socièté à "L'avion Simplex". There were at least two tailless monoplanes, one built for the 1922 Coupe Deutsch with a 240 kW (320 hp) Hispano-Suiza V-8 engine and another with a 12 kW (16 hp) Sergant A inline. The latter was designed to compete in a contest for low power aircraft, organised by the Petit Parisien newspaper. Both have been described with permutations of the names Arnoux, Carmier and Simplex without distinguishing between the types.

The 10 hp Carmier-Simplex was a cantilever monoplane with a thick wing which thinned outwards and was rectilinear in plan, with a leading edge swept at 20°, an unswept trailing edge and squared-off tips. Conventional ailerons filled the outer two-thirds of the trailing edge and the inner part was occupied by broad chord, elevator-like surfaces with a rudder cut-out. The Simplex had a fuselage not much deeper that the wing roots, with the engine in the nose and a single open cockpit at about two-thirds of the root chord. A conventional triangular fin ran from the cockpit to the trailing edge, where the fuselage ended, carrying a straight-edged rudder which extended down to the keel.

Its fixed undercarriage was conventional with a pair of mainwheels on an axle mounted on pairs of V-struts, the forward, vertical members were fixed to the wings and the rearward drag struts to the wing roots. A tailskid shock absorber was attached to an extension of the rudder post.

== Operational history ==
The Simplex-10 hp's career was brief, for although it began the initial trials of the Petit Parisien's contest in July 1923, piloted by Geogel, it suffered from engine problems and failed to qualify.

In May 1923, well before the Petit Parisien event, two Simplex aircraft had been accepted for the Second Experimental Congress to be held in August 1923. Their identities are uncertain but the wing spans and area were the same as those of the Simplex-10 hp. Both had lengths of 4.50 m (14 ft 9 in), notably greater than the Petit Parisien machine; one was powered by a 6.0 kW (8 hp) Anzani engine and the other by an 11 kW (15 hp) Sergant. Their pilots were to be Geogel and Carmier. However, there is no mention of them in the French journals's reports of the event in late August.

== Specifications ==
Data from Les Ailes, July 1923 Performance figures calculated.

General characteristics

- Crew: One
- Length: 3.80 m (12 ft 6 in)
- Wingspan: 9.0 m (29 ft 6 in)
- Wing area: 20 m^{2} (220 sq ft)
- Gross weight: 250 kg (551 lb)
- Powerplant: 11 × Sergant A 4-cylinder upright, air-cooled inline, 12 kW (16 hp) each maximum, at 3,200 rpm
- Propellers: 2-bladed

Performance

- Maximum speed: 120 km/h (75 mph, 65 kn)
- Stall speed: 35 km/h (22 mph, 19 kn)

== Bibliography ==
- Cortet, Pierre (October 1997). "Rétros du Mois" [Retro of the Month]. Avions: Toute l'aéronautique et son histoire (in French) (55): 4. ISSN 1243-8650.
