= Dart Cambridge =

British single-seat glider, 1935

Cambridge

General information
- Type: Single seat sailplane
- National origin: United Kingdom
- Manufacturer: Dart Aircraft Ltd., Dunstable
- Number built: 2

History
- First flight: 1 December 1935
- Developed from: Grunau Baby

The Dart Cambridge was a single-seat competition sailplane built in the United Kingdom in the 1930s. A development of the Grunau Baby, only two were built, flying with gliding clubs.

== Design and development ==
The Cambridge first appeared as the Zander and Weyl Cambridge, making its first flight a few months before Zander and Weyl Ltd. changed its name to Dart Aircraft Ltd. Like the Slingsby Kite 1, the Cambridge was an updated version of the successful and influential Grunau Baby. It retained the Baby wing with its thick, high lift airfoil, though slightly increased in span, introduced a smoother monocoque fuselage, a tailplane of greater span and a new rudder.

The wings of the Cambridge had a constant chord to about half span, outboard of which the leading edge was slightly swept and the trailing edge elliptically tapered. The ailerons were hinged on the outboard sections at a slight angle to the main spar, allowing them to be of almost constant chord. No flaps or airbrakes were fitted. The wings were mounted on a raised part of the fuselage just behind the cockpit, with single lift struts from the lower fuselage to the main spar at about one quarter span. The revised tailplane had swept leading edges and the elevators had forward-swept trailing edges, as on the Baby, but their extended span made it more pointed in plan. The fin was very narrow, with the rudder and elevator hinges at the same fuselage position. The rudder was almost semi-circular.

The smooth plywood monocoque fuselage became more slender aft of the pylon carrying the wing. The cockpit was open. A combination of a single, short, fuselage-mounted skid and integral tail bumper served as an undercarriage.

The Cambridge first flew on 1 December 1935. A second aircraft, known as the Cambridge 2, was a little lighter and had larger ailerons.

== Operational history ==
The first Cambridge was owned by the Duke of Grafton, who was one of the founding members of the Cambridge University Gliding Club (CUGC). It was flown as a club aircraft and was entered by them into the 1939 National Soaring Contests, though without making much impression. It was registered by the club after World War II in the brief period from 1949 when UK gliders appeared on the CAA register. It was de-registered by CUGC in 1953, by which time gliders no longer required CAA registration. Its later history is uncertain; it was at RAF Dishforth for a while and may have been burnt before 1973.

The Cambridge 2 was operated by the London Gliding Club who flew it into 6th place in the 1937 National Competitions, though it gained no prizes.

== Specifications (Cambridge I) ==
Data from Ellison

General characteristics

- Crew: one
- Length: 21 ft 4 in (6.50 m)
- Wingspan: 46 ft 4 in (14.12 m)
- Wing area: 157.4 sq ft (14.62 m^{2})
- Aspect ratio: 13.24
- Airfoil: Gōttingen 535
- Empty weight: 245 lb (111 kg)
- Gross weight: 450 lb (204 kg)

Performance

- Stall speed: 26 mph (42 km/h, 23 kn)
- Rate of sink: 180 ft/min (0.91 m/s) minimum
- Wing loading: 2.81 lb/sq ft (13.71 kg/m^{2})
