= Dart Totternhoe =

British single-seat glider, 1936

Totternhoe

General information
- Type: Single seat intermediate training glider
- National origin: United Kingdom
- Manufacturer: Dart Aircraft Ltd., Dunstable
- Number built: 3

History
- First flight: May 1936

The Dart Totternhoe was a single-seat secondary training glider produced in the United Kingdom in the 1930s. Three were built, one serving in the RAF.

== Design and development ==
The Totternhoe took its name from a Bedfordshire village; the home of the London Gliding Club is within Totternhoe parish, on the edge of Dunstable Downs. It was a wooden, single-seat secondary glider.

All the flying surfaces of the Totternhoe were straight-edged and fabric covered. The wings and tailplane, both mounted on top of the fuselage, were of constant chord and had blunt tips. No flaps or airbrakes were fitted. Two pairs of lift struts ran from the bottom of the fuselage to the wing spars just inboard of mid span. The near-rectangular rudder was hinged between the elevators, working in a cut-out.

The wooden fuselage was flat-sided, with a blunt nose and open cockpit. Immediately behind the cockpit the upper fuselage was raised to carry the wing, tapering away to the tail. A single main skid and small tail skid formed the undercarriage.

The Totternhoe first flew in May 1936.

== Operational history ==
Three Totternhoes were built; one was later rebuilt by Scott Light Aircraft. One flew with the Air Training Corps as VD199 and was transferred to the Royal Air Force Gliding & Soaring Association in 1950.

== Specifications ==
Data from Ellison

General characteristics

- Capacity: 1
- Length: 21 ft 6 in (6.55 m)
- Wingspan: 38 ft 9 in (11.8 m)
- Wing area: 192 sq ft (17.8 m^{2})
- Aspect ratio: 7.75
- Airfoil: Gõttingen 532
- Empty weight: 260 lb (118 kg)
- Gross weight: 460 lb (209 kg)

Performance

- Lift-to-drag: Maximum 23 at 26 mph (42 km/h)
- Wing loading: 2.40 lb/sq ft (11.71 kg/m^{2})
