= Farman Moustique =

Moustique
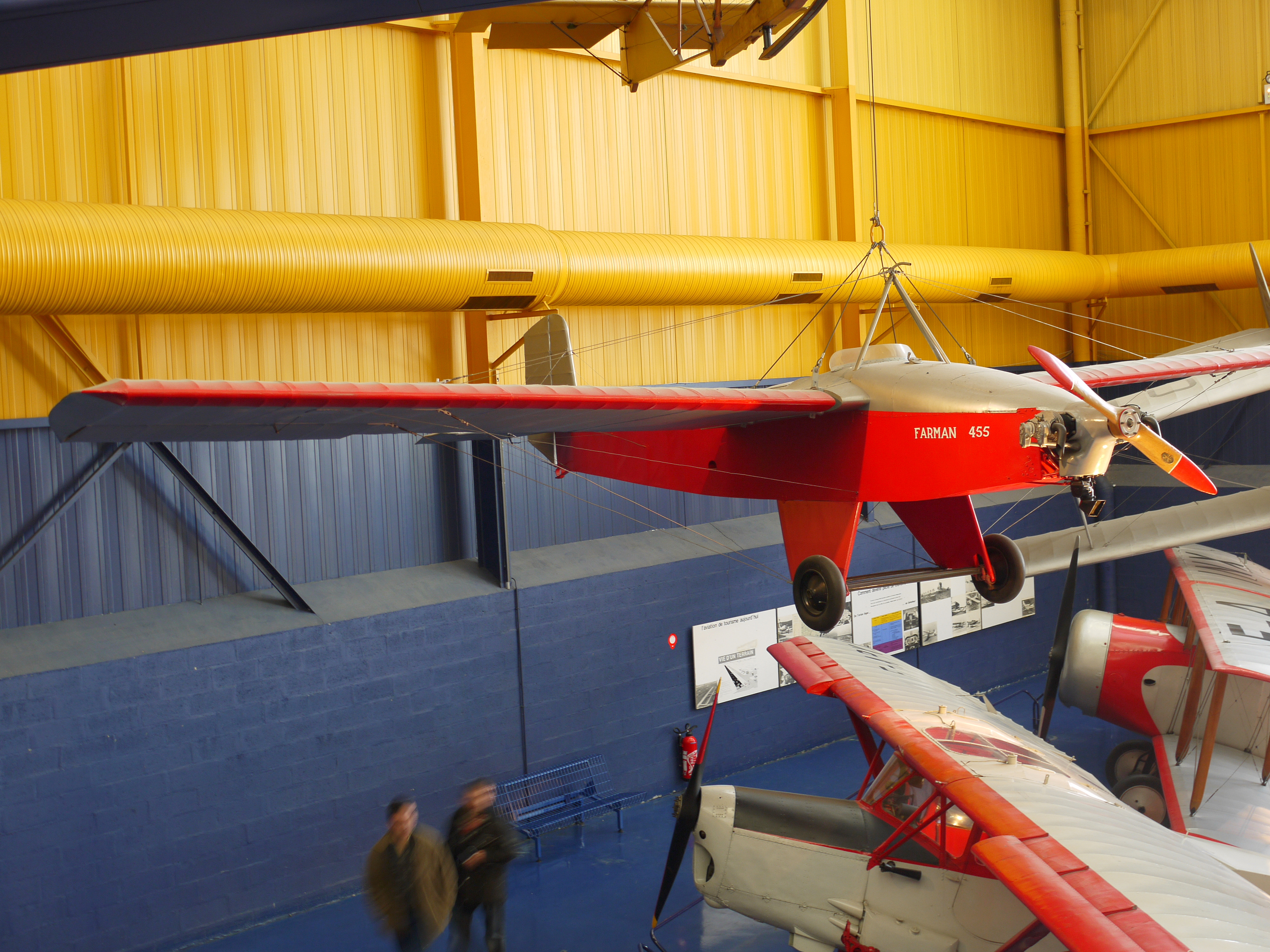
- Farman F 455 Super Moustique, Musée de l'Air et de l'Espace, Le Bourget, Paris

General information
- Type: Sport/tourer
- National origin: France
- Manufacturer: Société des Aéroplanes Henry et Maurice Farman, Boulogne-Billancourt
- Primary user: Service de l'Aviation Populaire (French government)
- Number built: 59

History
- First flight: May 1919

The Farman Moustique is a family of French monoplanes built by the Société des Aéroplanes Henry et Maurice Farman at Billancourt.

Shortly after the end of World War I, Farman introduced a low powered single seat monoplane for sport and tourism. It flew for the first time in May 1919 and was named the Moustique (in English, Mosquito). A little later, aircraft of this kind became known in the United Kingdom as motor gliders, the subjects of the first Lympne Trials of 1923. In 1922 one Aviette, without its engine, had already won prizes at a national glider competition. Three months before the Lympne Trials several Aviettes competed in an equivalent French meeting for moto-aviettes at Buc. The design was revived, over 17 years after its first appearance, as the F 450 Moustique and was one of the aircraft purchased by the French government as part of l'Aviation Populaire programme.

== Design and development ==
The original Moustique, later known as the Moustique I, was a shoulder wing monoplane. The wing was rectangular in plan, fabric covered and was wired braced from above and below. The upper wires were attached to a king post protruding from the raised, curved decking ahead of the cockpit and lower wires went to the undercarriage structure. The wings carried full span ailerons.

Behind the cockpit the fuselage, which reached up only to the pilot's waist, was slender. It was square sectioned and covered with thin plywood. The parallel chord horizontal tail had separate elevators with the deep rudder moving between them. These surfaces were fabric covered and the rudder was round topped; there was no fixed fin. The undercarriage consisted of two parallel spruce panels mounted on the fuselage, bearing two mainwheels on a single axle. This first aircraft was powered by a 30 hp (22 kW) flat twin ABC Scorpion engine.

The first Moustique flew in May 1919, but by the following year its span had been reduced from 7.65 m to 5.0 m (from 25 ft 1 in to 16 ft 5 in), saving a little weight, and was known as the HF 206 or the HF206 Moustique I. No other Moustique had so short a span.

In 1922 a glider version called the Aviette had flown. This had an extended span of 10.50 m (34 ft 5 in) and an unladen weight of only 43 kg. It also had a deeper fuselage, allowing the pilot to sit with his head just clear of the upper surface, and a new upper wing bracing system with the bracing wires attached to the top of a tall, three post pylon, just in front of the pilot. It also had a reshaped rudder with a linear, rising top. It was the only Moustique type glider, but the fuselage, wing bracing and rudder modifications were carried forward into all later variants.

In 1923 three powered Aviettes were entered for the competition at Buc, Yvelines. All had an 18 hp (13 kW) engines but one aircraft had a 3-cylinder radial Salmson 3 Ad and the other two, 4-cylinder inline Sergant As.

The Moustique II or F 21 of 1924 was powered by a 35 hp (26 kW) 3-cylinder Anzani 3 A2 radial and had a wing with a span of 8.20 m (26 ft 11 in), fitted with short span ailerons. Two took part in the 1924 Tour de France.

In the mid-1930s there was a government-driven revival of interest in low cost flying with the introduction of the Aviation Populaire programme. In response, Farman relaunched the Moustique with a slightly shorter span of 8.07 m (26 ft 6 in) and a longer fuselage. It first flew in December 1935. The first five prototypes were designated F 450 Moustique. The first was initially powered by a 35 hp (26 kW) Poinsard 2 Ca flat twin engine; later it, like the others had Mengin engines of the same type and power. A visual difference between this and earlier Moustiques was the presence of a normal fin, carrying a round-topped rudder. The production version, the F 451 Moustique, had a 25 hp (19 kW) AVA 4A-00 flat-four two-stroke. This variant was produced in much greater numbers (46) than any other Moustique.

The last Moustique development was the two seat F 455 Super Moustique, initially called the Moustique III, which first flew in 1936. Its span was increased by 1.65 m (5 ft 5 in) and it had a more powerful 35 hp (26 kW) Mengin 2 A-01 engine. Only one was built; its performance in the climb was poor, but in any case the light aircraft section of the Farman works was shut down when the company was nationalised in March 1937.

== Operational history ==
During the early 1920s Farman entered Moustiques into several competitions. In August 1922 the first national French glider meeting, the Congrės expérimental d'aviation sans moteur, organised by the Association of French Flyers (AFF) and partly government-funded, was held in Combegrasse, Puy-de-Dôme. Farman entered two aircraft, the Aviette glider and a biplane (a de-motorised Farman FF 65); overall there were 17 contestants. The Aviette, piloted by Lois Bossoutrot, won several prizes in the competition between catapult-launched gliders, achieving the lowest sinking speed, the greatest altitude (80 m or 262 ft) and longest over-launch site duration of 3 min 30 s. The Aviette was placed second in the distance-covered contest, flying 5.28 km (3.28 mi). Over the fortnight-long event, the Aviette was in the air for 48 min 25 s.

In July 1923, three powered Aviettes competed at Buc, Yvelines for the Grand Prix de Motoaviette against eighteen other entrants. The competition was open to all aircraft with a maximum takeoff weight of less than 250 kg (551 pounds). There was a 125,000 FF prize for the fastest flight of 30 laps around a 10-kilometer (6.21-mile) course. The winner was Lucien Coupet in the Salmson-powered Aviette, covering 310 kilometers (192.5 miles) in 4 hours 37 minutes 19 seconds. No other aircraft could overcome the wind and rain.

A year later, Farman entered two MF 21 Moustique IIs into the Tour de France, an eight-stage contest organised by the AFF. Initial elimination trials in bad weather reduced the 15 entrants to a starting group of three for the Tour proper. The MF 21 flown by Maurice Drouhin was the only survivor by the end of the second stage, and he was declared the winner, having covered 1,807 km (1,123 mi) in 20 hr 40 min 27 s. Drouhin also won the Prix Solex, worth 50,000 FF in April 1925, flying the Salmson-powered Aviette. This required a flight from Paris to Rouen (about 120 kilometres or 75 miles) using less than 3 kg (6.6 lb) of petrol and oil.

In 1938 the first F 450 was used to test-fly a device called a gouvernes autoptères, invented by Marcel Granoli. Its purpose was to provide automatic lateral and longitudinal stability in the event of a momentary sideslip. The test showed only limited success.

Thirty-six of the 46 production F 451 Moustiques were bought by the state under their Aviation Populaire programme, intended to bring people from all walks of life into aviation and make pilots of them. Other F 451s were bought by individuals, partly attracted by the low costs: the aircraft sold at just under 20,000 FF. To make the Moustique attractive to the hunting fraternity, Farman advertised an optional rear locker "for the transport of a dog."

== Variants ==
Moustique
Later Moustique I, one only. 7.65 m (25 ft 1 in) span.
HF 206
The original Moustique with wings cropped to a 5.0 m (16 ft 5 in) span.
Aviette
4 built with Salmson or Sergant engines. 10.50 m (34 ft 5 in) span. One converted to glider for Combegrasse competition. 3 entered for the competition at Buc
F 21 Moustique II
2 built with Anzani engines. 8.20 m (26 ft 11 in) span. Entered into Tour de France.
F 450 Moustique
1936 revival. 5 built with Poinsard or Mengin engines. 8.07 m (26 ft 6 in) span.
F 451 Moustique
Production version of F 450; 46 built with Ava 4A-00 engines. 8.07 m (26 ft 6 in) span.
F 455 Super Moustique
Initially known as the Moustique III. Two side-by-side seat, dual control version. 1 built with Mengin engine. 9.72 m (31 ft 11 in) span.

== Aircraft on display ==
The sole Super Moustique, F-AOYL, is on public display at the Musée de l'Air et de l'Espace, le Bourget.

== Specifications (F.451) ==
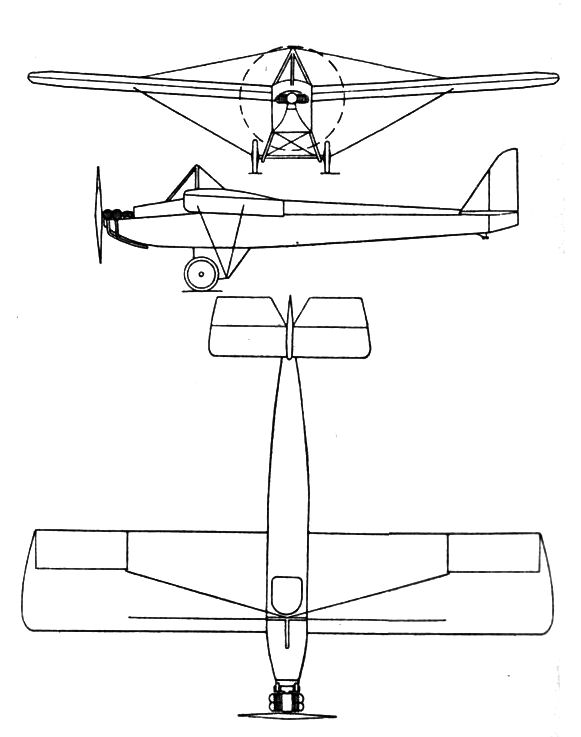
Farman F.451 3-view drawing from L'Aerophile February 1938

Data from Les Avions Farman

General characteristics

- Capacity: 1
- Length: 6.40 m (21 ft 0 in)
- Wingspan: 8.07 m (26 ft 6 in)
- Height: 1.90 m (6 ft 3 in)
- Wing area: 10.50 m^{2} (113.0 sq ft)
- Empty weight: 151 kg (333 lb)
- Gross weight: 285 kg (628 lb)
- Powerplant: 1 × Ava 4A-00 2-cylinder horizontally opposed two-stroke, 19 kW (25 hp)
- Propellers: 2-bladed wooden Merville Srs.639

Performance

- Maximum speed: 130 km/h (81 mph, 70 kn)
- Range: 350 km (220 mi, 190 nmi)

== Bibliography ==
- Liron, Jean (1984). Les avions Farman. Collection Docavia. Vol. 21. Paris: Éditions Larivière. OCLC 37146471.
- Ogden, Bob (2009). Aviation Museums and Collections of Mainland Europe. Air Britain (Historians) Ltd. ISBN 978-0-85130-418-2.
