= Ava 4A =

Engine for light aircraft

- Type: Flat-four, air-cooled two-stroke
- National origin: France
- Manufacturer: Ava
- Designer: Marcel Violet

The Ava 4A was a low power flat-four (boxer engine) developed for very light aircraft in France in the 1930s. It was used by several prototypes and at least one production series.

== Design and development ==
Marcel Violet was a French racing driver who designed his own two-cylinder, two-stroke engines. He also designed a two stroke horizontally opposed flat-four, which was built under licence at L'agence general moteurs "Ava" by Jean Aubry of the Société J. Thibault, G Aubry et Cie, alloy metal specialists, as the Ava 4A. It only produced 19 kW (25 hp) and was intended to power small, low cost, single seat aircraft, replacing the aging Anzanis and completing with the French Mengin Type B and the older British Bristol Cherub engines.

The Ava 4A was on display at the November 1936 Paris Salon. It powered several prototypes and also the forty-six examples of the series production variant of the Farman Moustique, the F.451.

== Variants ==
Ava 4A-00
19 kW (25 hp), as described.
Ava 4A-02
Identical to 4A-00 except for 80 mm (3.15 in) bore and increased compression, giving 26 kW (35 hp) continuous power. Weight 38 kg (84 lb).

== Applications ==
- Carmier T.10
- Dart Pup
- Dart Kitten
- Druine D.30 Turbulent
- Farman Moustique
- Jodel D.98 Bébé
- Mignet HM-14 Pou du Ciel
- SFAN II
- Starck AS90 New Look
- Tipsy S

== Survivors ==
A 4A-00 survives in a private collection and is sometimes exhibited on loan.

== Specifications (4A-00) ==
Data from Jane's All the World's Aircraft 1938, p.40d

=== General characteristics ===
- Type: Air-cooled flat-four, two-stroke
- Bore: 70 mm (2.76 in)
- Stroke: 70 mm (2.76 in)
- Displacement: 1.08 L (66 cu in)
- Length: 554 mm (21.81 in) over propeller boss
- Width: 550 mm (21.65 in)
- Dry weight: 37 kg (82 lb) including mounting and propeller boss.
- Opposing cylinders offset. Cast iron cylinders with finned, hemispherical alloy heads. Single piece nitrided steel crankshaft with roller bearings and ball thrust bearing. Light alloy crankcase.

=== Components ===
- Fuel system: Amrac carburettor, rotary inlet distribution valve. One plug per cylinder, two magnetos, each firing two plugs.
- Fuel type: petroil (4% oil)
- Cooling system: air

=== Performance ===
- Power output: Continuous 19 kW (25 hp) at 2,300 rpm, maximum 22 kW (30 hp) at 2.500 rpm
- Specific fuel consumption: 400-440 g/kW (0.66-0.72 lb/hp)
