= Lycoming XR-7755 =

1940s American piston aircraft engine

R-7755
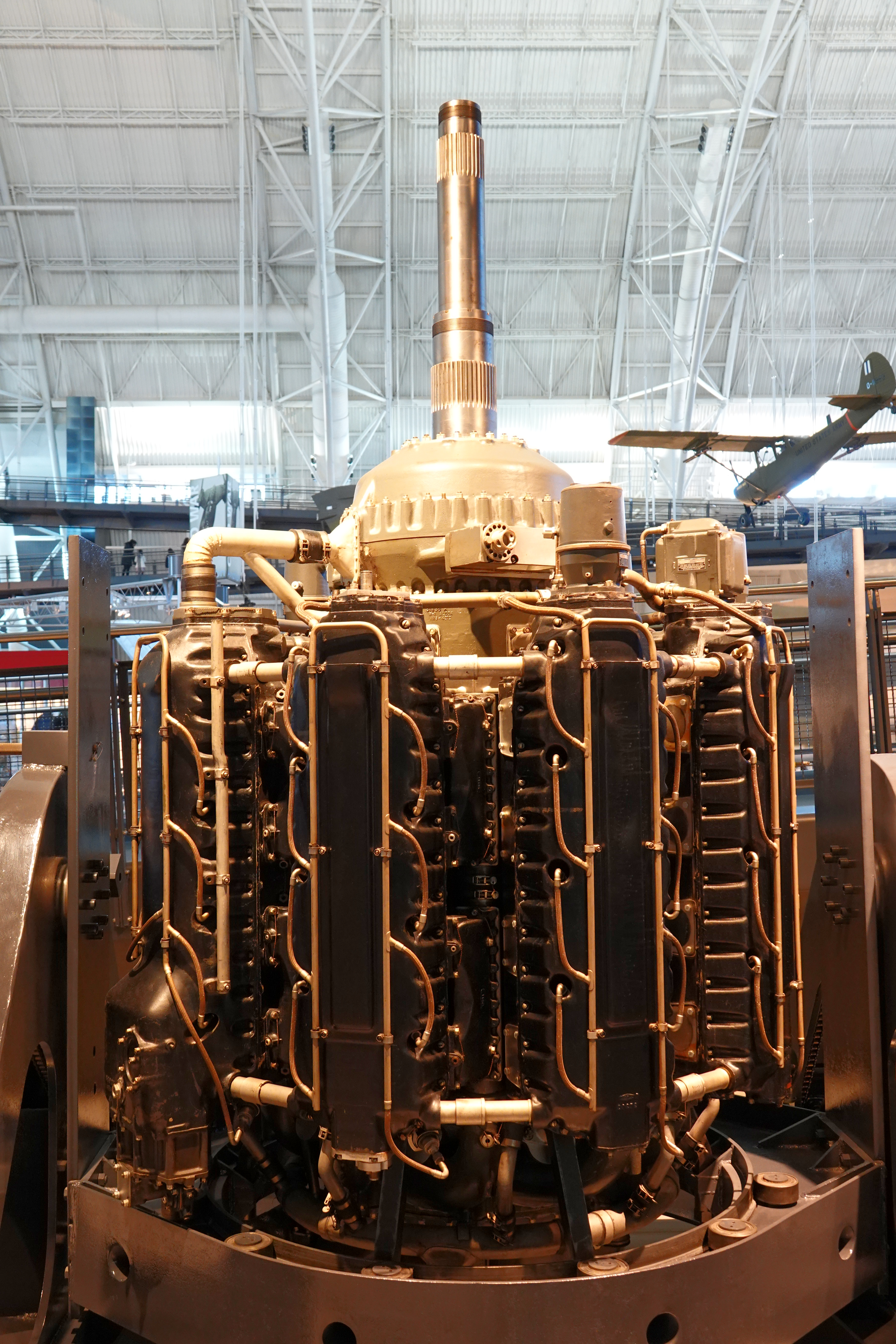
- Lycoming XR-7755-3 at the Smithsonian Institution. Note the magnetos and distributors on the forward ends of the cylinder bank and camshafts (painted grey).
- Type: Four-row Radial engine
- National origin: United States
- Manufacturer: Lycoming
- First run: 1944
- Manufactured: 1944 out of production
- Number built: 2

The Lycoming XR-7755 was the largest piston aircraft engine ever built in the United States, (Note: The 42-cylinder Yakovlev M-501 diesel was larger, at 8,760 in^{3} (143.6 L) displacement. Like the XR-7755, it was tested but never flew, though it was later developed into a family of marine diesel engines, including the Zvezda M503.) with 36 cylinders totaling about 7,750 in^{3} (127 L) of displacement and a power output of 5,000 horsepower (3,700 kilowatts). It was originally intended to be used in the "European bomber" that eventually emerged as the Convair B-36. Only two examples were built before the project was terminated in 1946.

== Development ==
Lycoming had not been successful in designing a high-power engine. They had started with an attempt to make a hyper engine that led to the 1,200 hp (890 kW) O-1230; by the time the engine was ready, however, new aircraft designs were all calling for more power. They tried again by "twinning" the engine to produce the H block H-2470, which saw some interest in the Vultee XP-54 "Swoose Goose" project. Work on the H-2470 ended when the XP-54 was cancelled.

In one final attempt, Lycoming decided to go all out and build what would turn out to be the largest displacement aircraft piston engine in the world. They put together a team under the direction of VP of Engineering Clarence Wiegman at their main Williamsport factory in the summer of 1943 and started work.

== Design ==
The resulting design used nine banks of four cylinders each at a 40° angle to each adjacent cylinder, arranged around a central crankshaft, to form a four-row radial engine. Unlike most multi-row radials, which "spiral" the cylinders to allow cooling air to reach them, the R-7755 was water-cooled, and so each of the cylinder heads in a cylinder bank were in-line within a cooling jacket.

Each cylinder bank had a single overhead camshaft actuating the poppet valves. The camshaft included two sets of cams, one for full takeoff power, and another for economical cruise. The pilot could select between the two settings, which would shift the camshaft along its axis to bring the other set of cams over the valve stems. The design mounted some of the accessories on the "front side" of the camshafts, namely two magnetos and four distributors. The seventh camshaft was not used in this fashion, its location on the front of the engine was used to feed oil to the propeller reduction gearing.

The original XR-7755-1 design drove a single propeller, but even on the largest aircraft the propeller needed to absorb the power would have been ridiculously large. This led to a minor redesign that produced the XR-7755-3, using a new propeller gearing system driving a set of coaxial shafts to power a set of contra-rotating propellers. The propeller reduction gearing also had two speed settings to allow for a greater range of operating power than adjustable props alone could deliver. Another minor modification resulted in the XR-7755-5, the only change being the replacement of carburetors with a new fuel injection system.

== Operational history ==
The engine first started testing at 5,000 hp (3,700 kW) in 1944 with the XR-7755-3. A second example was provided, as planned, to the United States Army Air Forces at Wright Field in 1946. However, by this time the Air Force had lost interest in new piston designs due to the introduction of jet engines. The original test engine was later delivered to the Smithsonian Institution, where it was restored in 2002.

== Specifications (XR-7755) ==
Data from Jane's all the World's Aircraft 1947

=== General characteristics ===
- Type: 36-cylinder turbosupercharged liquid-cooled "star" (9 banks of 4 cylinders in each bank, at 40° angles) aircraft piston engine
- Bore: 6.375 in (161.9 mm)
- Stroke: 6.75 in (171 mm)
- Displacement: 7,756.3 cu in (127.103 L)
- Length: 121.35 in (3,082 mm)
- Diameter: 61 in (1,500 mm)
- Width: 60.5 in (1,540 mm)
- Height: 61 in (1,500 mm)
- Dry weight: 6,050 lb (2,740 kg)

=== Components ===
- Valvetrain: Single overhead camshaft per bank with separate cams for takeoff and economical cruise (Variable valve timing)
- Supercharger: Impeller diameter 14.4 in (370 mm), at 6:1 drive ratio
- Fuel system: Carburetor (-1 and -3); fuel injection (-5)
- Oil system: Pressure system, 100 psi (690 kPa) at 500 lb/min (230 kg/min) flow rate
- Cooling system: Liquid-cooled

=== Performance ===
- Power output:
  - 5,000 hp (3,700 kW) at 2,600 rpm takeoff
  - 4,000 hp (3,000 kW) at 2,300 rpm cruise
- Specific power: 0.64 hp/cu in (29 kW/L)
- Fuel consumption: ≈ 580 gal/h (480 imp gal/h; 2,200 L/h)
- Specific fuel consumption:
  - 0.70 lb/(hp⋅h) (0.43 kg/(kW⋅h)) at takeoff power
  - 0.485 lb/(hp⋅h) (0.295 kg/(kW⋅h)) at 70% power
  - 0.37 lb/(hp⋅h) (0.23 kg/(kW⋅h)) at minimum cruise power
- Power-to-weight ratio: 0.82 hp/lb (1.35 kW/kg)

== See also ==
Comparable engines

- Armstrong Siddeley Hyena
- Armstrong Siddeley Deerhound
- Dobrynin VD-4K
- Wright R-2160 Tornado
- Junkers Jumo 222
- BMW 803
- Pratt & Whitney R-4360 Wasp Major

Related lists

- List of aircraft engines
