= DieselJet =

Italian aircraft engine manufacturer

DieselJet s.r.l. is an aircraft engine manufacturer based in Castel Maggiore, Italy. It was established in 2003 and grown in partnership with the University of Bologna, Forlì Airport ISAERS and Centro Ricerche FIAT (CRF). Lycoming Engines licensed its TDA engines in 2009–2010. Metatron S.p.A., an automotive industry group field manufacturing Compressed natural gas and Liquefied petroleum gas systems, own it since 2011.

== Products ==
The TDA CR 1.9 8V EASA was certified on 11 June 2010 : a 1.9 L liquid cooled, 4 cylinder, 4 stroke, 8 valves engine, with a turbocharger and Common Rail injection, a 1:0.644 reduction gearbox and dual FADEC, it produces 118 kW (160 hp) at take-off and 107 kW (146 hp) continuously at 2450 propeller RPM for 205 kg (452 lb). It made its maiden flight on 17 January 2005 with an IAI Heron UAV. It powered the Alenia Aermacchi Sky-Y UAV demonstrator on its 20 June 2007 first flight Its 82mm bore and 90.4mm stroke lead to a 1910 cm^{3} displacement, it have a 16.0 compression ratio and a 1600 bar common rail and the manufacturer announces 190 kg (420 lb), 121 kW / 165 hp maximum and 110 kW continuously till an 8000 ft critical altitude and a 225 g/kWh (0.370 lb/(hp⋅h)) fuel consumption. It is based on the 1.9 JTD engine.

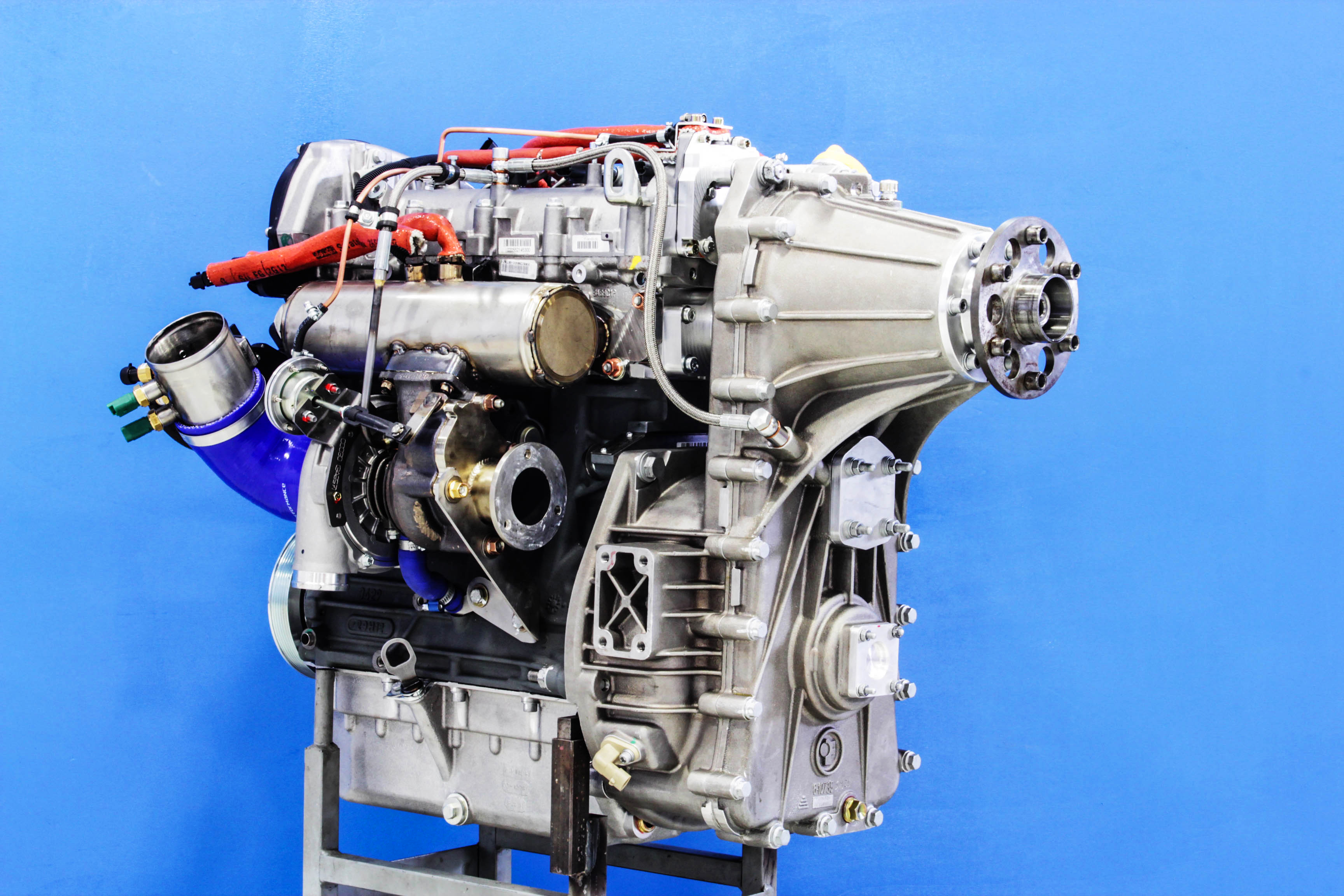
DieselJet TDA CR 2.0 16V engine

The TDA CR 2.0 16V, certified 8 March 2016, is a 2.0 L 16 valves engine with a 1:0.607 reduction ratio and a similar configuration, producing 142 kW (193 hp) continuous and 160 kW (217.5 hp) at take-off at 2306 propeller RPM for 219 kg (483 lb).

It powered the IAI Super Heron first flight in 2012 and aims for a 1,500 hours MTBF, a 1,000 hours Time between overhaul initially then 2,000 in service for a €25,000 Cost and a 2,000 hours initial service life then 4,000. The 1955 cm^{3} engine has cylinders bores of 83 mm and 90.4 mm strokes, a 16.0:1 compression ratio for a 210 g/kWh (0.35 lb/(hp⋅h)) min. brake specific fuel consumption, its manufacturer claims 205 kg (452 lb), a 8,700 ft critical altitude and operability till 35,000 ft.

A light-sport aircraft gasoline engine GA 1.4 8V was in development in 2014-2016. Based on the Fiat FIRE engine with a 2.54:1 reduction gearbox, it has four cylinders of 72mm bore and 84mm stroke for 1368 cm^{3}, a 11:1 compression ratio and generates 115 hp (86 kW) at 2461 propeller rpm for 85 kg (187 lb) and a 215 g/(hp⋅h) (288 g/kWh) fuel consumption.

In 2016, DieselJet was developing a 240 kW (320 hp) TDA CR 3.0 24V.
