= Lycoming DEL-120 =

Aircraft Diesel Engine

DEL-120
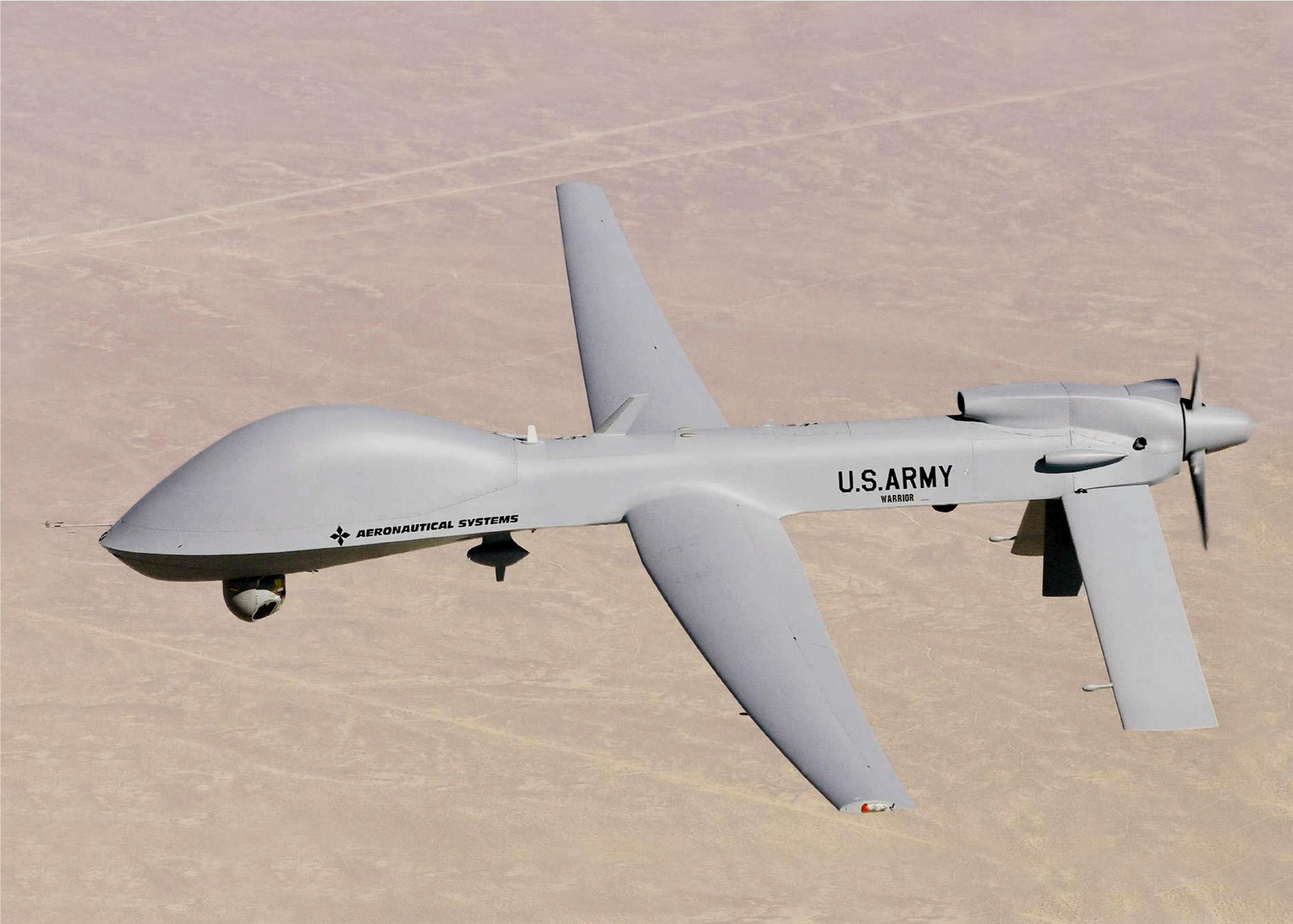
- Lycoming DEL-120 on MQ-1C Gray Eagle
- Type: Military Aircraft diesel engine
- National origin: United States
- Manufacturer: Lycoming Engines
- Major applications: General Atomics MQ-1C Gray Eagle
- Manufactured: 2013–present

The Lycoming DEL-120 is an aircraft diesel engine produced by Lycoming Engines using automotive technology and initially powering unmanned aircraft. Because the DEL-120 is a non-certified engine and is meant for military use only, there is no civil application of this engine.

== Applications ==
- General Atomics Improved MQ-1C Gray Eagle

== Specifications ==
Data from Lycoming

=== General characteristics ===
- Type: four-stroke, four-cylinder compression-ignition
- Bore: 3.2 in (82 mm)
- Stroke: 3.6 in (90.4 mm)
- Displacement: 1,910 cm^{3} (117 cu in)
- Dry weight: 360 lb (160 kg) dry
- Designer: FIAT via DieselJet

=== Components ===
- Turbocharger: air-to-air intercooler
- Fuel type: JET A/A1, JP-8, F-24
- Cooling system: liquid, with expansion tank
- Reduction gear: 0.553
- FADEC

=== Performance ===
- Power output: Take-Off: 205 hp (153 kW), Max Continuous (90%): 180 hp (134 kW), both at 2101 propeller RPM
- Specific power: 1.206 hp/cu in (54.9 kW/L)
- Compression ratio: 16.5:1
- Fuel consumption: 64.8 lb/h (29.4 kg/h) at Max Continuous
- Specific fuel consumption: 0.36 lb/(hp⋅h) (220 g/kWh) at Max Continuous, 0.345 lb/(hp⋅h) (210 g/kWh) in Cruise (60% PLA, 1770 propeller RPM)
- Power-to-weight ratio: 0.57 hp/lb (0.94 kW/kg)
