= Elcar =

Defunct American motor vehicle manufacturer

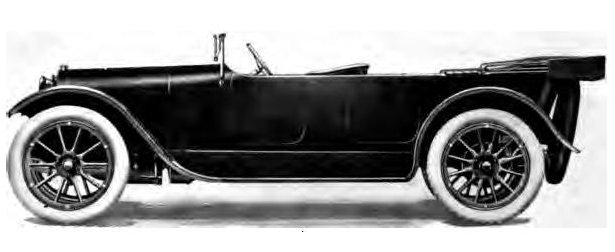
- 1916 Elcar

Overview
- Manufacturer: Elkhart Carriage Company
- Model code: L-4; 8-80; 91
- Production: 1915–1931
- Assembly: United States: Elkhart, Indiana

Body and chassis
- Body style: 3-passenger coupé roadster; 4-passenger open roadster; 5-passenger touring; 5-passenger sedan; 5-passenger brougham; 7-passenger touring; 7-passenger sedan
- Layout: Hotchkiss

Powertrain
- Engine: 4 L (261 cu in)
- Transmission: Selective sliding

Dimensions
- Wheelbase: 3,226 mm (127 in)

Chronology
- Predecessor: Komet

The Elcar was an American automobile manufactured from 1915 until 1931. The car was produced by the Elkhart Carriage Company, owned by William and George Pratt, of Elkhart, Indiana, which had been in business for over 30 years before producing its first car.

== Production ==
They initially produced carriages and, from 1909, automobiles that were manufactured under the brand name Pratt-Elkhart until 1915. After 1915, the company name changed to Pratt Motor Car Company and the brand name to Pratt. This first car was the 30/35 hp Elkhart, which began production in 1905 and remained on the market until 1909. In 1909 the 4·2 liter Sterling appeared (it ceased production in 1911), followed in 1911 by the Komet. The four-cylinder engine of the Pratt-Elkhart 40 had 4417 cc with a bore of 107.95 mm and a stroke of 120.65 mm. The engine output was 40 HP. The transmission had three gears. The wheelbase was 117 inches = 2982 mm. The rear axle was driven by a driveshaft. In top gear, speeds of 5 km/h (3.1 mph) up to the maximum speed of 80 km/h (50 mph) could be achieved. The rims with a diameter of 34 inches had 10 spokes on the front axle and 12 spokes on the rear axle. The fuel tank held 15 gallons = 57 liters. The Pratt-Elkhart 40 was available in the model variants T, F, R, and L. The T was a touring car, the F an open vestibule (four-door open car), the R was a roadster and the L a closed limousine.

The Elcar appeared in 1915, and was first offered in two models, a Lycoming-engined four and a Continental-engined six. A straight-eight, again with a Continental engine, was produced beginning in 1925. In 1930, the company began to use the complex Lever engine produced by Alvah Leigh Powell, although only four Elcar-Levers were completed.

== New York City contract ==
It next entered a lucrative contract within New York City, under which it would supply "El-Fay" taxis to Larry Fay, a prominent businessman and club owner with known mob ties.

== Production model specifications ==
- Elcar Seven Passenger Sedan-8-80

== Company demise ==
Fay's resources were badly hit by the Great Depression. Bankruptcy trustee and interim president Arthur Martin Graffis led a two-year campaign to attract investors and save the company including a project to market the 1930 Elcar as a 1931 Mercer. The company was dissolved in 1931, after only two prototypes had been constructed. Fay himself was eventually shot dead in 1933 by a disgruntled employee.

== Gallery ==
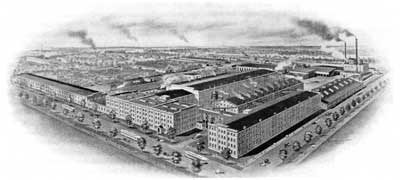
Elkhart Carriage & Harness Mfg. Co., Beardsley Ave (1910)

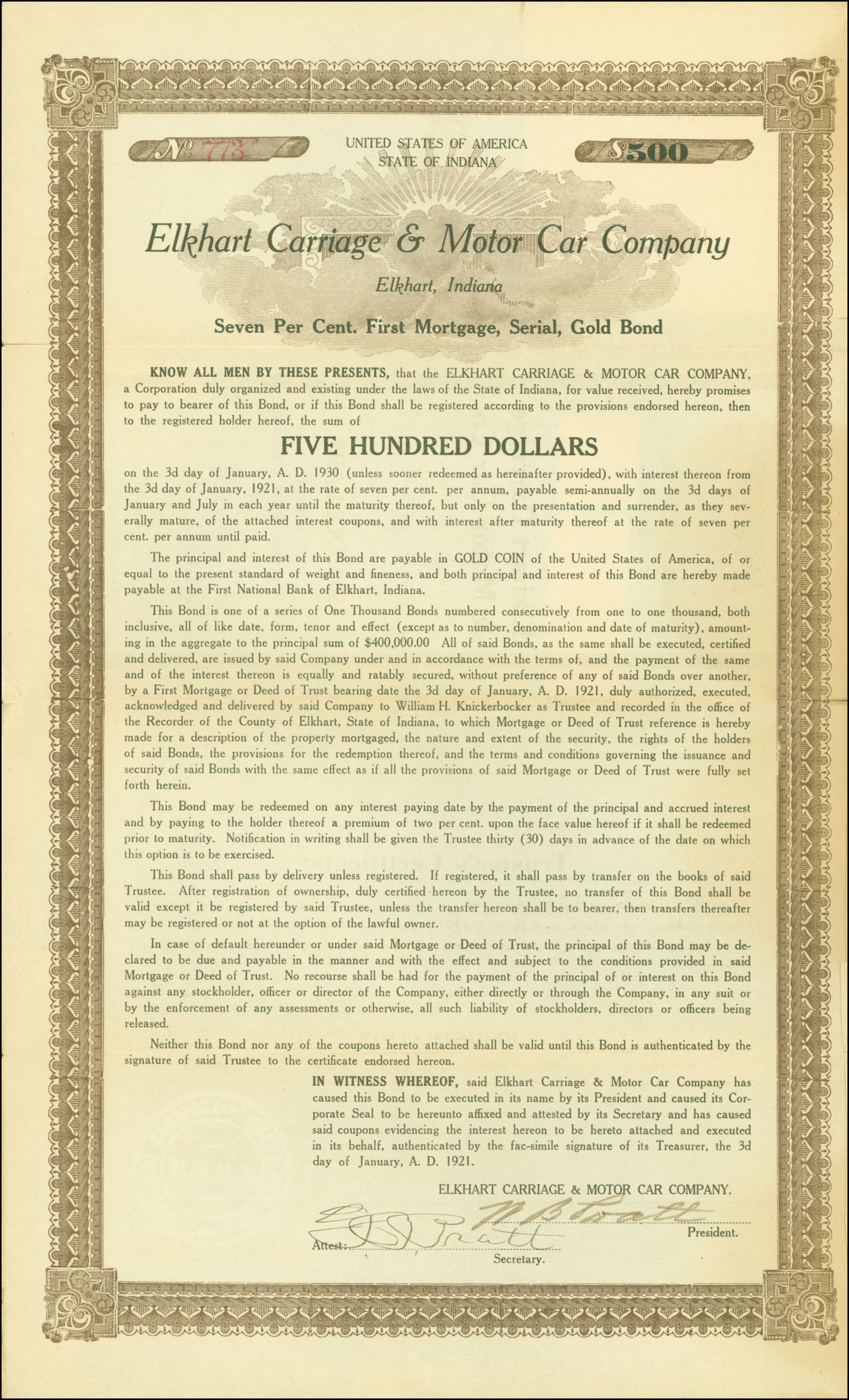
Gold Bond of the Elkhart Carriage & Motor Car Company, issued 3 January 1921

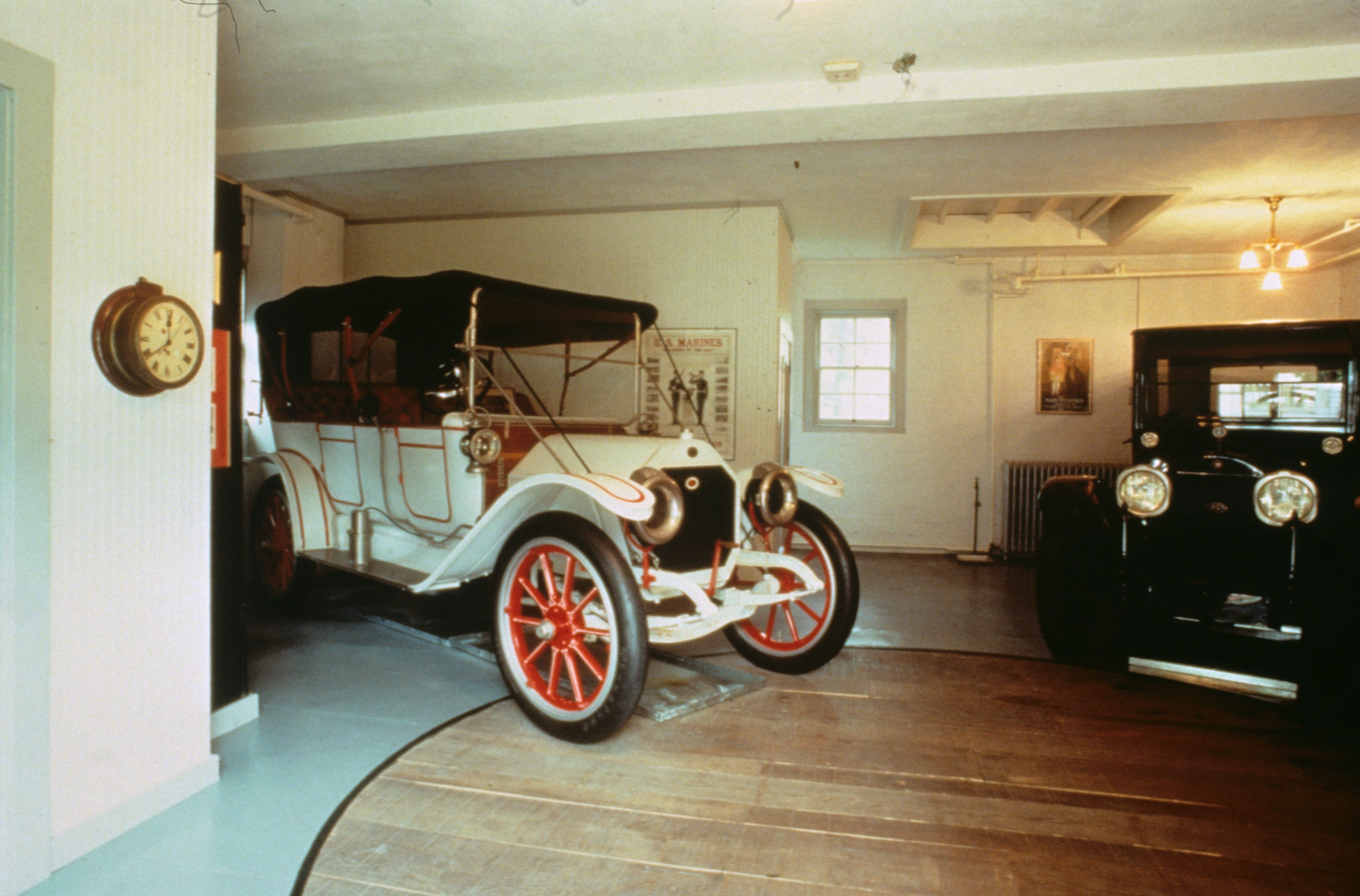
Ruthmere, 302 East Beardsley Avenue (Elkhart, Indiana)

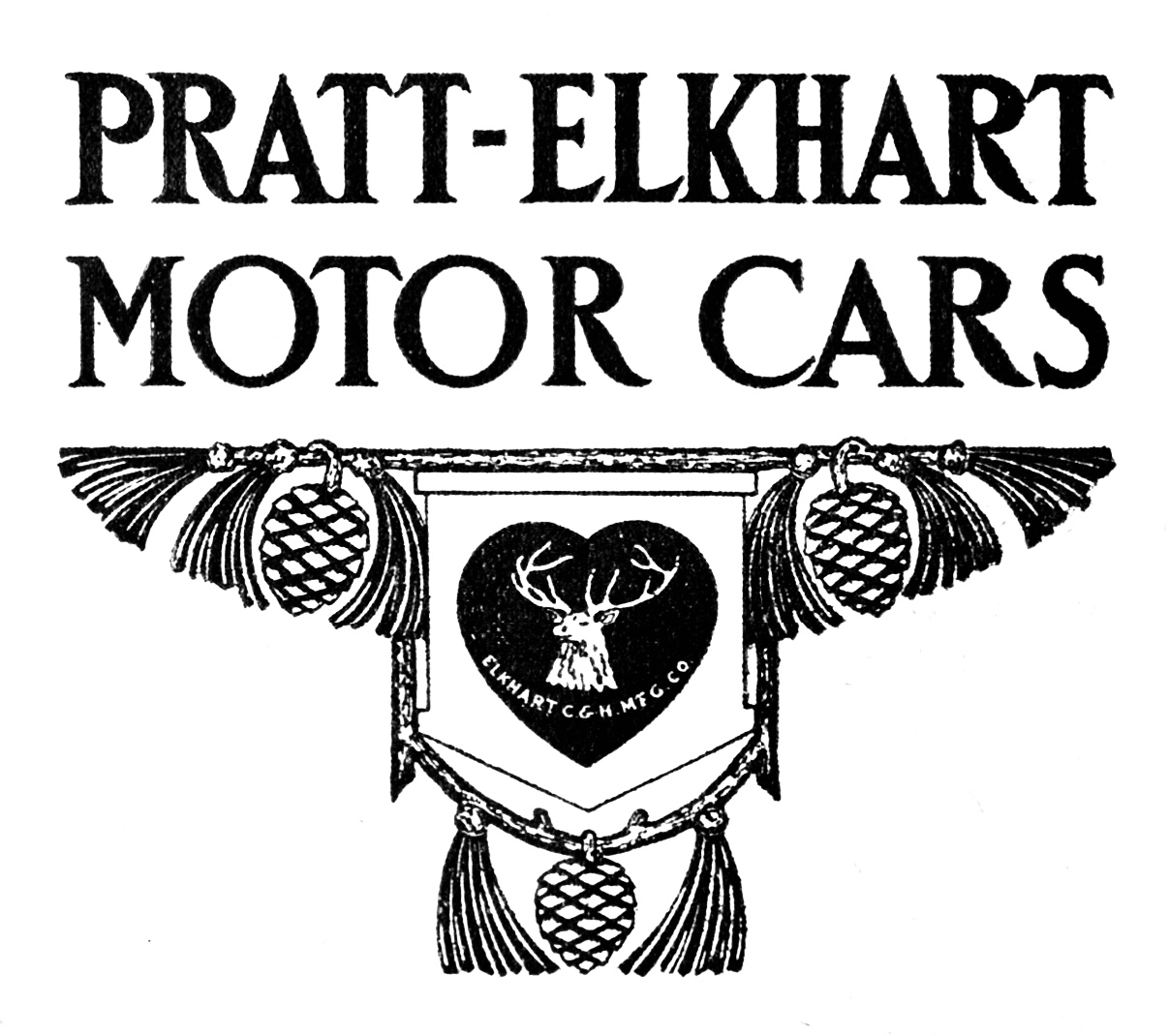
Pratt-Elkhart (1909–1915)

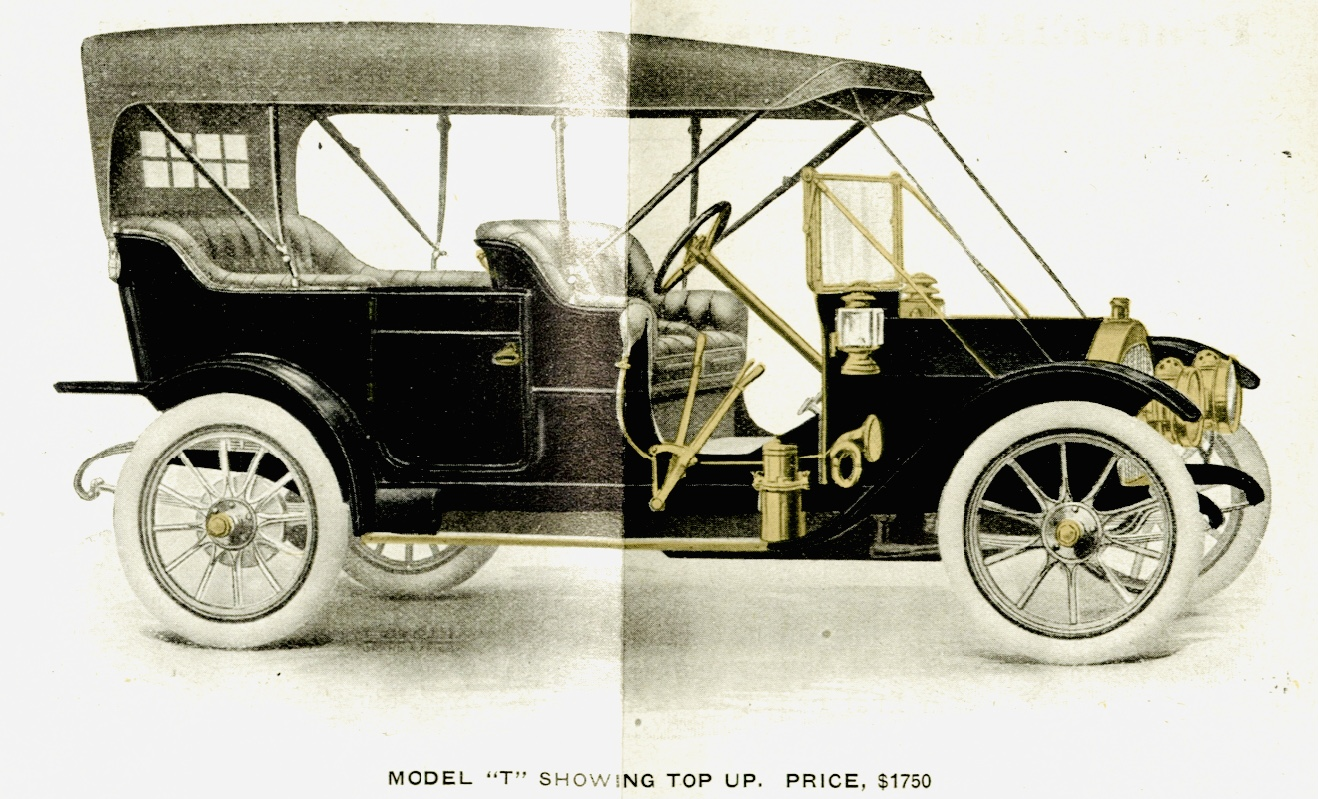
Pratt-Elkhart 40 Model T

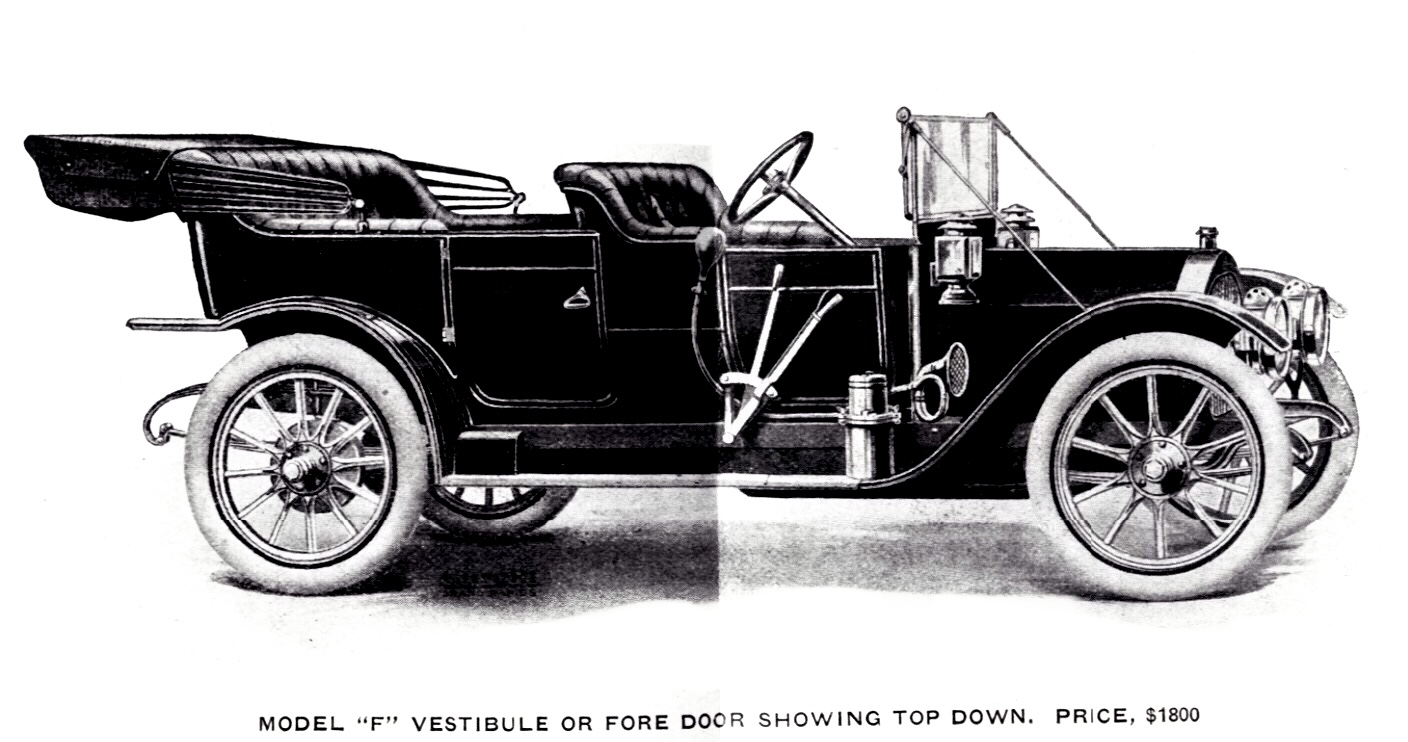
Pratt-Elkhart 40 Model F

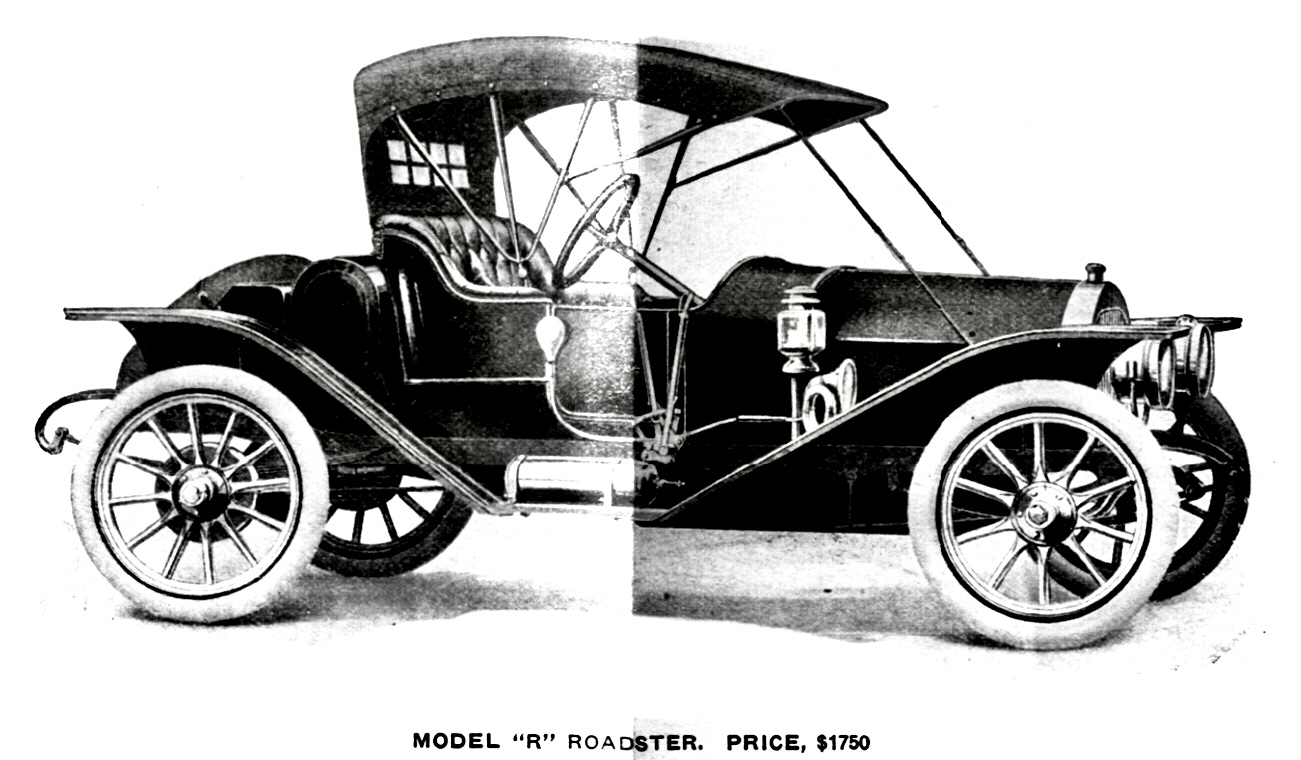
Pratt-Elkhart 40 Model R

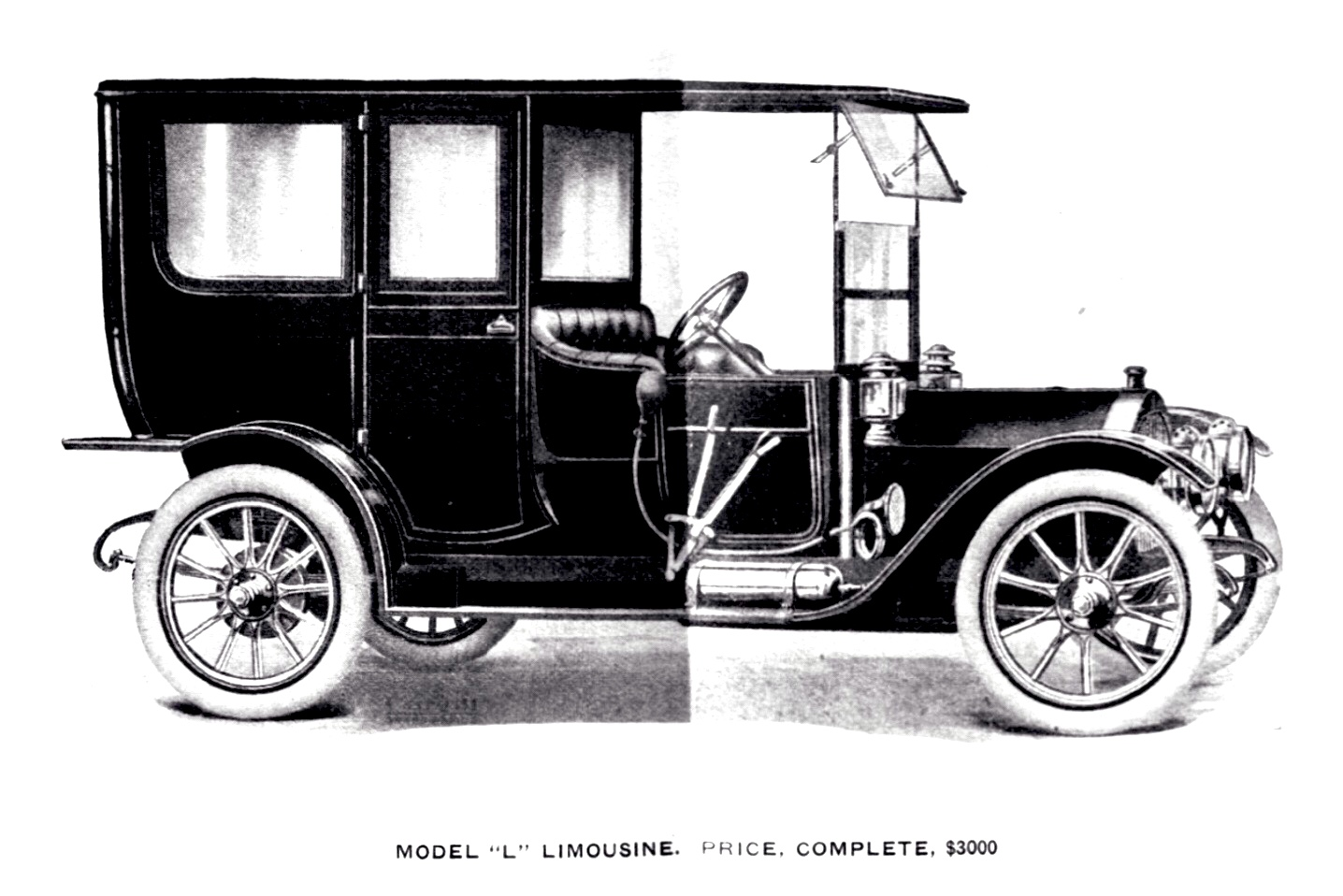
Pratt-Elkhart 40 Model L
