= Elcar Seven Passenger Sedan-8-80 =

American car model

The Elcar Seven Passenger Sedan-8-80 was manufactured by Elkhart Carriage Company of Elkhart, Indiana.

== Specifications (1926 data) ==
- Color – Light or dark coach blue or Thebes gray
- Seating Capacity – Seven
- Wheelbase – 127 inches
- Wheels – Steel or wood
- Tires – 32" x 6.20" balloon
- Service Brakes – Hydraulic, contracting on four wheels
- Emergency Brakes – Contracting on front universal
- Engine – Eight cylinder, vertical, cast en bloc, 3-1/8 x 4-1/4 inches (260.78 c.i.d.; 4.273 liters); valves in side; H.P. 31.25 N.A.C.C. rating
- Lubrication – Full force feed
- Crankshaft – Five bearing
- Radiator – Cellular type
- Cooling – Water pump
- Ignition – Storage Battery
- Starting System – Single Unit
- Voltage – Six
- Wiring System – Single
- Gasoline System – Vacuum
- Clutch – Dry plate
- Transmission – Selective sliding
- Gear Changes – 3 forward, 1 reverse
- Drive – Hotchkiss
- Springs – Semi-elliptic
- Rear Axle – Three-quarter floating
- Steering Gear – Cam and lever

=== Standard equipment ===
New car price included the following items:

- combination tail and stop lights
- two lights on instrument board
- electric horn
- speedometer
- ammeter
- oil gauge
- motometer
- automatic gasoline gauge on instrument board
- bumpers front and rear
- snubbers all around
- automatic windshield wiper
- rear vision mirror
- cowl ventilator
- extra rim and carrier
- pump
- jack
- tools
- repair kit
- robe rail
- foot rail
- enclosed models have heaters

=== Optional equipment ===
The following was available at an extra cost:

none listed

=== Prices ===
New car prices were F.O.B. factory, plus Tax:

- 8-80 Five Passenger Touring – $2165
- 8-80 Seven Passenger Touring – $2265
- 8-80 Four Passenger Open Roadster – $2315
- 8-80 Three Passenger Coupé Roadster – $2315
- 8-80 Five Passenger Sedan – $2265
- 8-80 Seven Passenger Sedan – $2765
- 8-80 Five Passenger Brougham – $2865

It is unknown at this time if any have survived.

== See also ==
- Elcar
