= Vultee V-11 =

American attack aircraft

V-11/V-12
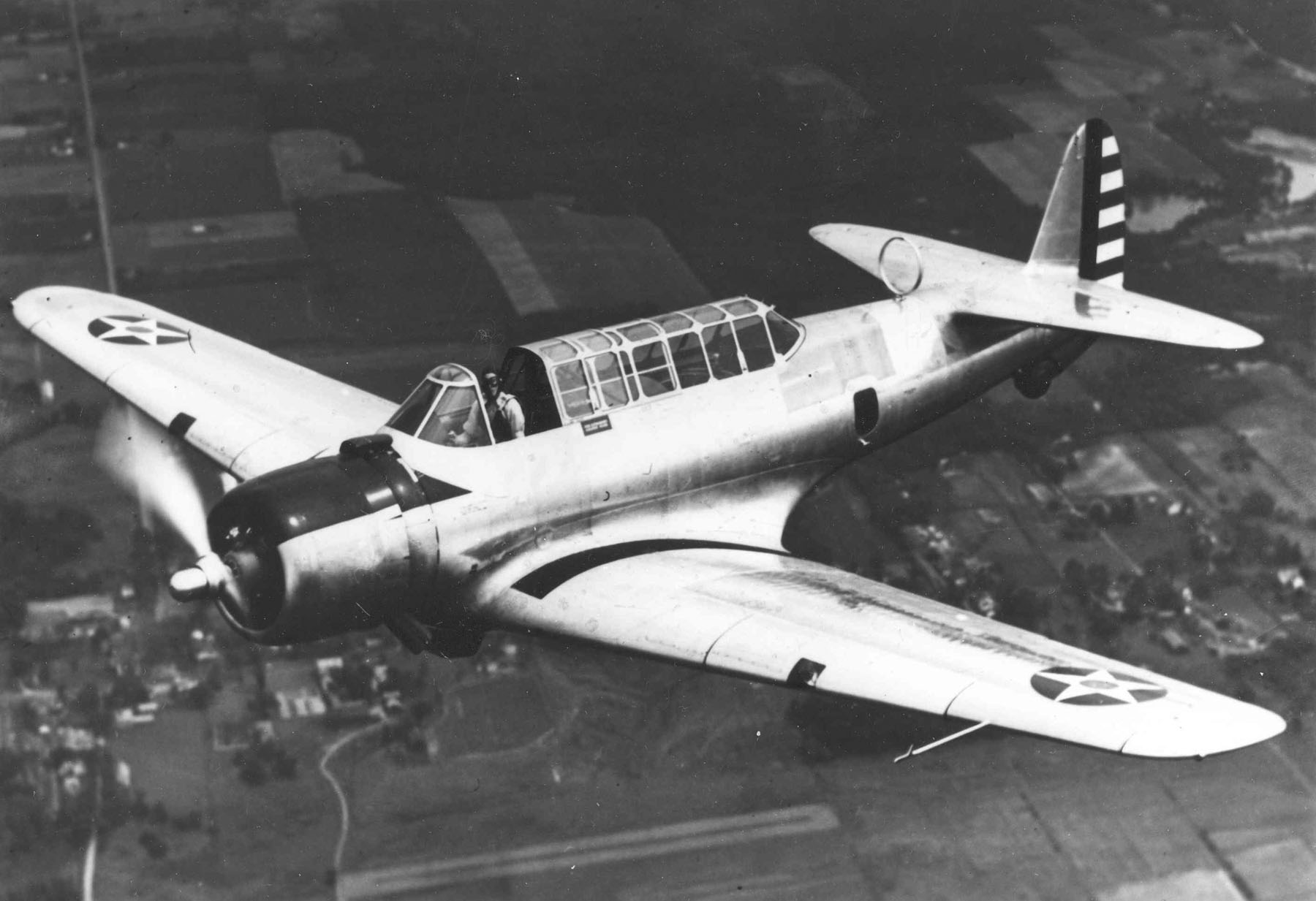

General information
- Type: Ground attack
- Manufacturer: Vultee
- Designer: Gerard Freebairn Vultee
- Status: Retired
- Primary users: Republic of China Air Force Turkish Air Force; Soviet Air Forces; Brazilian Army Aviation
- Number built: 175+ (Note: plus as many as 4 more in Russia, and as many as 45 additional airframes that were delivered as parts sets but probably not assembled in China, for a maximum of 224.)

History
- Manufactured: 1935–1940
- Introduction date: 1937
- First flight: 17 September 1935
- Developed from: Vultee V-1

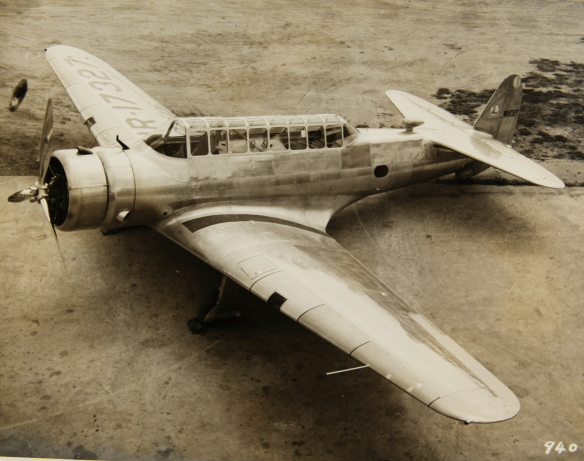
Vultee V-11GB prototype NR-17327

The Vultee V-11 and V-12 were American stressed-skin monocoque monoplane attack aircraft of the 1930s. Developed from the Vultee V-1 single-engined airliner, the V-11 and V-12 were purchased by several nations for their armed forces, including China, who used them in combat against Japanese forces in the Second Sino-Japanese War. The United States Army Air Corps purchased seven V-11s as the YA-19 in the years before World War II, testing them to gather data to compare against twin engine light attack aircraft.

== Design and development ==
In 1935, Vultee produced a light bomber derivative of their single-engined passenger transport, the Vultee V-1, which, while demonstrating good performance, was only sold in small numbers owing to restrictions placed on the use of single-engined aircraft for scheduled passenger transport operations.

The resulting aircraft, the Vultee V-11, retained the single-engined, low wing format and all-metal stressed skin structure of the V-1. It combined a new fuselage with accommodation for the three crew members under a long greenhouse canopy with the wings and tail surfaces of the Vultee V-1.

According to Jonathan Thompson, "Based on the V-1A, the V-11 was a modern, fast and effective military airplane when it appeared in 1935; during the next three years 102 V-11s in six variations were sold to four countries - the Soviet Union, China, Turkey and Brazil - before the Air Corps took seven A-19s. An improved version known as the AB-2 (Attack bomber, 2nd type) and later as the V-12, was tested in 1938 and provided the basis for further sales to China, bringing the total V-11 models and derivatives, including those built under license, to an estimated 225."

Duplicate emergency flying controls were provided for the observer/dorsal gunner in the V-11GB. According to Thompson, "Below his seat is the retractable bombardier's hatch; he lay prone, facing forward for the bomb run or rearward to use the ventral gun."

== Operational history ==
=== China ===
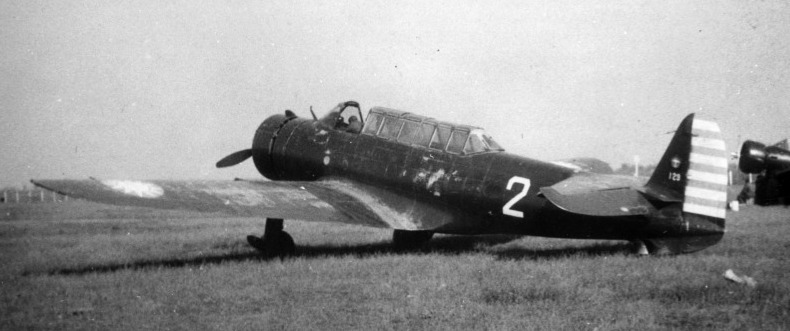
Camouflaged Chinese Vultee V-11-G

An initial order for 30 two-seat V-11Gs was placed by China before the end of 1935. This was followed in 1939 by orders for two versions (the V-12-C and V-12D) of the more powerful V-12 variant. The majority of these were planned to be assembled from kits at the Central Aircraft Manufacturing Company factory at Loiwing near the China-Burma border, and while the first batch of 25 V-12-Cs were completed successfully, the factory was heavily bombed just after assembly of the first V-12-Ds commenced. This resulted in the part built airframes being evacuated to India, where it was planned that the aircraft be completed at the Hindustan Aircraft Limited factory in Bangalore. However, after a few were assembled, production was stopped as the factory was diverted to more urgent overhaul work.

The V-11s and V-12s served as light bombers and achieved some success, including a mission by 4 aircraft to bomb the Japanese held airfield at Yuncheng on February 5, 1939, by the 10th Squadron of the Republic of China Air Force, before the aircraft were withdrawn from bombing missions to training and liaison duties in 1940.

=== Brazil ===
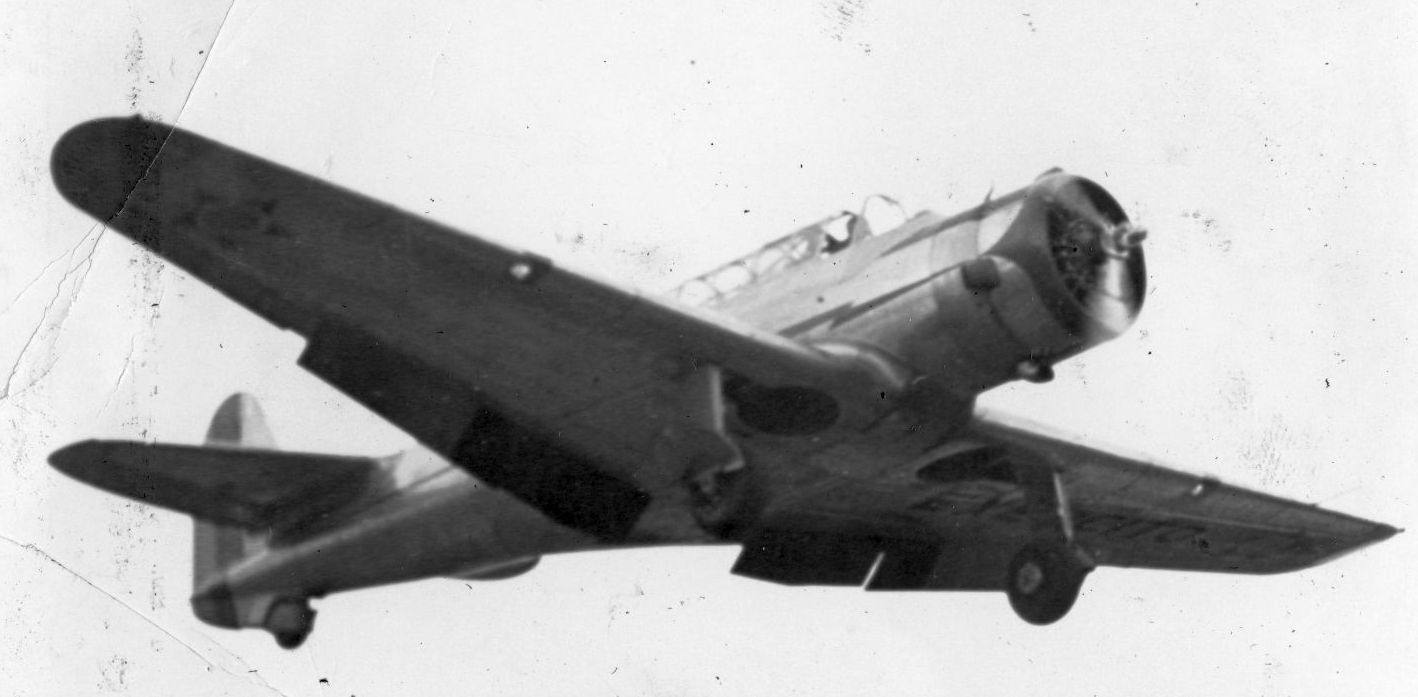
Brazilian Vultee V-11-GB2 landing

In February 1939, the Brazilian Army Air Corps acquired the first 10 Vultee V-11–GB2s for long range bombing. 26 aircraft were eventually used by the Brazilian Air Force.

A 3,250 km (2,020 mi) non-stop flight was made across the Brazilian hinterland in 11 hours and 45 min on 8 November 1939 using a V-11.

On 26 August 1942, a U-boat was attacked 50 miles off the town of Ararangua off the southern coast of Brazil. Despite the unsuitability for anti submarine operations, the aircraft flew low and dropped its load of three 250 lb (110 kg) bombs, some of which exploded around the submarine, however the blast damaged the low flying aircraft.

=== Soviet Union ===
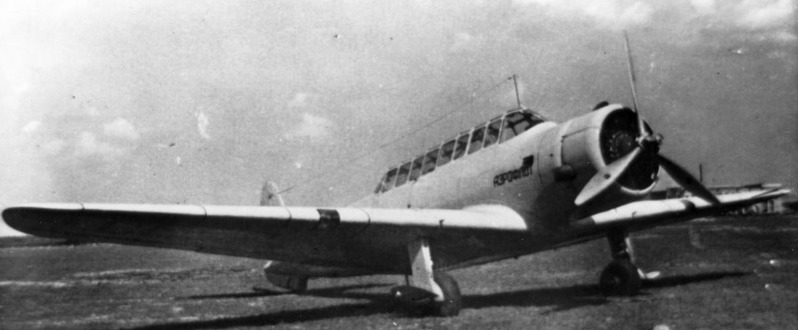
Aeroflot Vultee PS-43

In 1936, the Soviet Union purchased four three-seat V-11-GB aircraft, together with a production license. The aircraft entered Soviet production in 1937 as the BSh-1 (Bronirovanny Shturmovik), but the armour fitted for the ground attack role unacceptably reduced performance and production was stopped after 31 aircraft. They were transferred to Aeroflot and redesignated PS-43 for use as high speed transports until the German invasion in 1941, when they were returned to the Air Force for liaison purposes.

=== United States ===
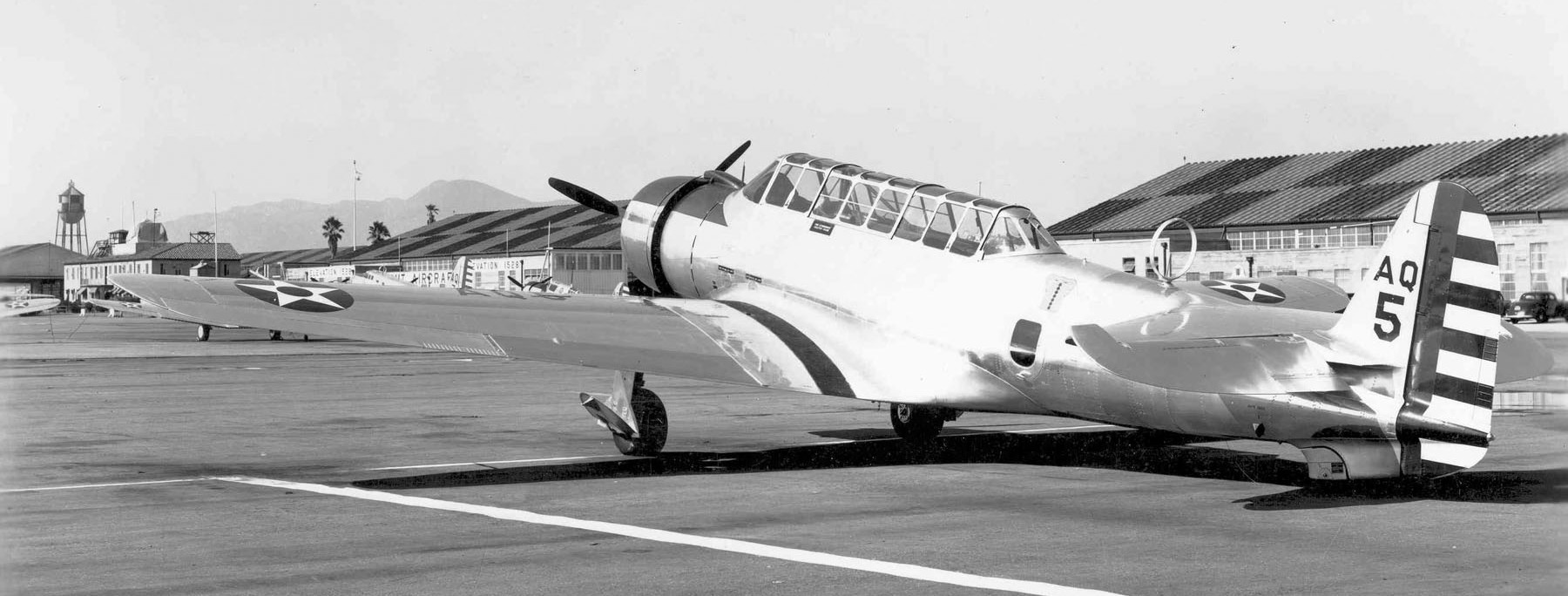
Vultee YA-19 of the 17th Attack Group at March Field, California in 1939

In the late 1930s, the United States Army Air Corps favored twin-engine light attack aircraft but seven YA-19 aircraft were ordered in the summer of 1938 for comparison purposes. The YA-19s were armed with six .30 in (7.62 mm) machine guns and 1,080 lb (490 kg) bombs in an internal bomb bay, powered by a 1,200 hp (890 kW) Twin Wasp radial engine and was manned by a crew of three including a pilot, observer/gunner, and bombardier/photographer.

An unusual feature of the YA-19 design was its horizontal stabiliser which was located forward of the vertical tail. The small size of the vertical stabilizer caused yaw instability so the last YA-19 (S/N 38-555) was equipped with enlarged vertical stabilizer.

Service tests showed that twin-engine attack aircraft were faster, could be better armed and carried a larger bomb load so no further YA-19s were ordered. After comparison tests five YA-19s were redesignated A-19 and assigned to the 17th Attack Group at March Field in California for a brief period before being transferred to the Panama Canal Zone for utility transport and liaison duties. The A-19 never saw combat and was quickly withdrawn in the early 1940s.

== Variants ==
=== Vultee Designations ===
V-11
First prototype fitted with 750 hp (560 kW) Wright SR-1820-F53 Cyclone driving a two-bladed Hamilton Standard controllable-pitch propeller, which crashed killing both pilot and the project engineer.
V-11-A
Second prototype, similar to first V-11, but with a three-bladed constant speed propeller.

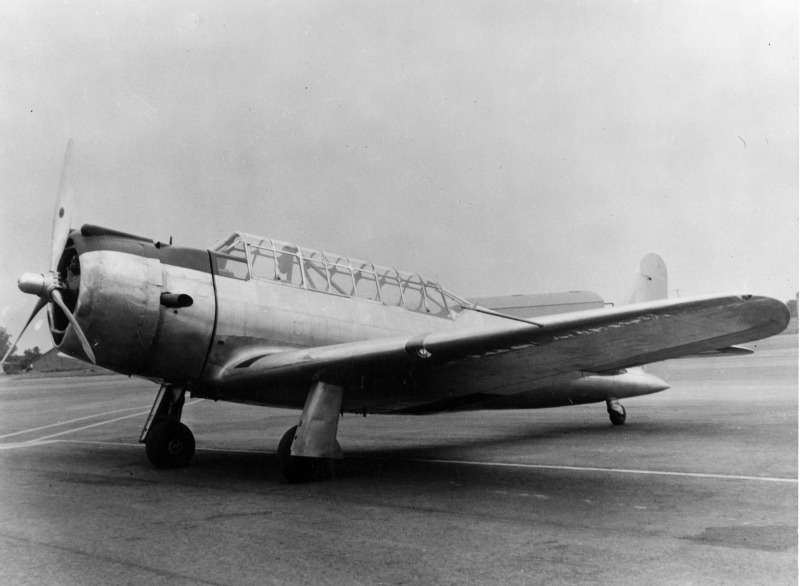
Vultee V-12 prototype

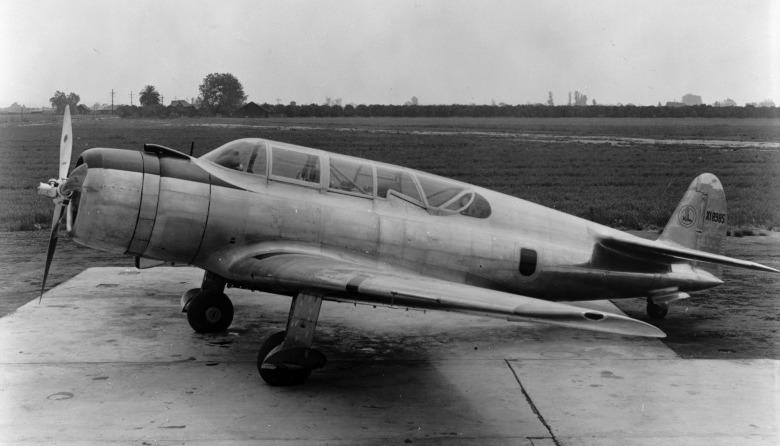
Vultee V-12-D prototype

V-11-G
Initial production two-seat light bomber. Powered by an 850 hp (630 kW) Wright R-1820-G2 Cyclone engine. 30 built for China.
V-11-GB
Three-seat version of V-11. 4 aircraft purchased by Soviet Union (2 as pattern aircraft), 40 by Turkey and others.
V-11-GB2
26 purchased by Brazil – generally similar to V-11-GB
V11-GB2F
Final example for Brazil fitted with floats, however it wasn't accepted.
V-11-GBT
redesignation of V-11-GB for Turkey
V-12
Revised version of three-seat bomber with refined aerodynamics and more power. One prototype flew in 1939 powered by Pratt & Whitney R-1830 Twin Wasp engine.
V-12-C
Production version of V-12 for China. Powered by R1820-G105B Cyclone engine. 26 built, one by Vultee and remaining 25 assembled in China.
V-12-D
Revised version with new fuselage and powered by 1,600 hp (1,200 kW) Wright R-2600 Cyclone 14 engine. 52 ordered for China, two pattern aircraft built by Vultee and 50 for local assembly.
V-52
Unbuilt observation design based on YA-19.

=== USAAC Designations ===
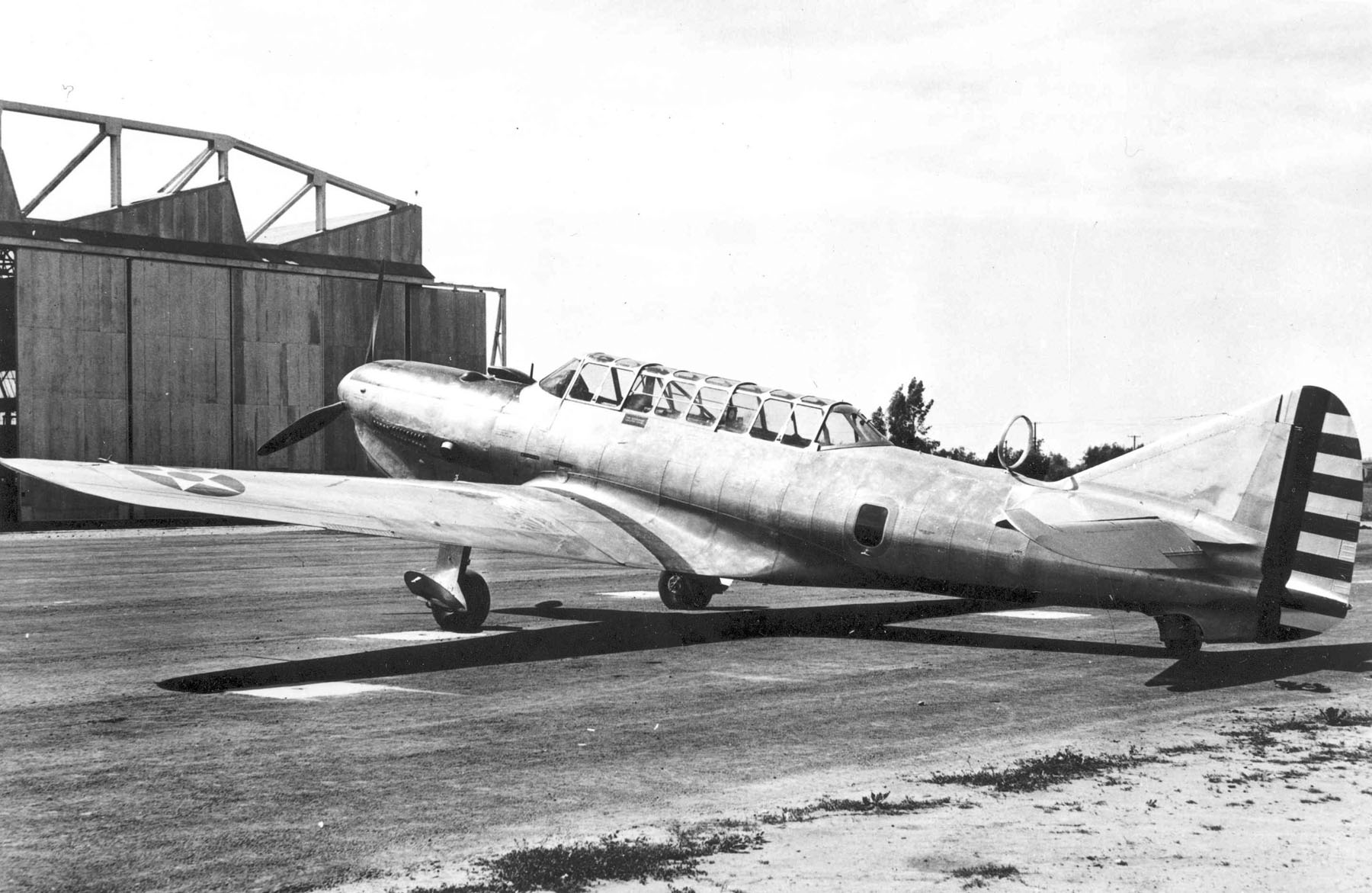
Vultee YA-19A powered by Lycoming O-1230 engine

YA-19
Variant of V-11-GB for United states Army Air Corps. Seven examples built.
YA-19A
The last YA-19 was redesignated and completed as an engine test bed. Equipped with enlarged vertical stabilizer (for improved directional stability) and powered by Lycoming O-1230 (12-cylinder opposed) engine.
YA-19B
The second YA-19 built was redesignated after being fitted with a Pratt & Whitney R-2800 radial engine as an engine test bed.
YA-19C
The YA-19A was redesignated after being fitted with a Pratt & Whitney Twin Wasp R-1830-51 engine. Performance was similar to the YA-19.
A-19
The remaining five YA-19s were redesignated A-19 after assignment to active duty.

=== Soviet Designations ===
BSh-1
Soviet licensed armoured ground attack version. Powered by 920 hp (690 kW) M-62. Production stopped after at least 31 built.
PS-43
Designation for BSh-1 when used by Aeroflot as light transport.

== Operators ==
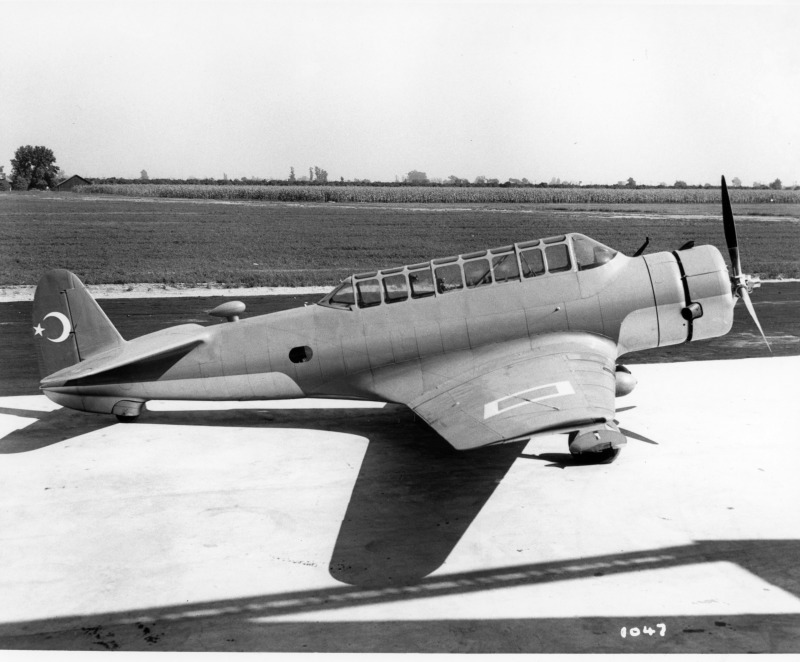
Turkish V-11-GB

Brazil
Brazilian Army Aviation – Vultee V-11-GB2 (25 delivered)
Brazilian Air Force - aircraft transferred when Air Force created
China

- Chinese Nationalist Air Force
  - 14th Squadron – Vultee V-11G (30), V-12C (25 delivered from order of 26, which was built but never delivered) & Vultee V-12D (52 delivered)

Soviet Union
Soviet Air Forces – Vultee V-11GB (4 delivered) & BSh-1 (31-35 built at Moscow Menzhinskii factory)
Turkey

- Turkish Air Force
  - 2nd Regiment – Vultee V-11GB (41 delivered)

United States
United States Army Air Corps – A-19/V-11GB (7 delivered)

== Specifications (Vultee XA-19) ==
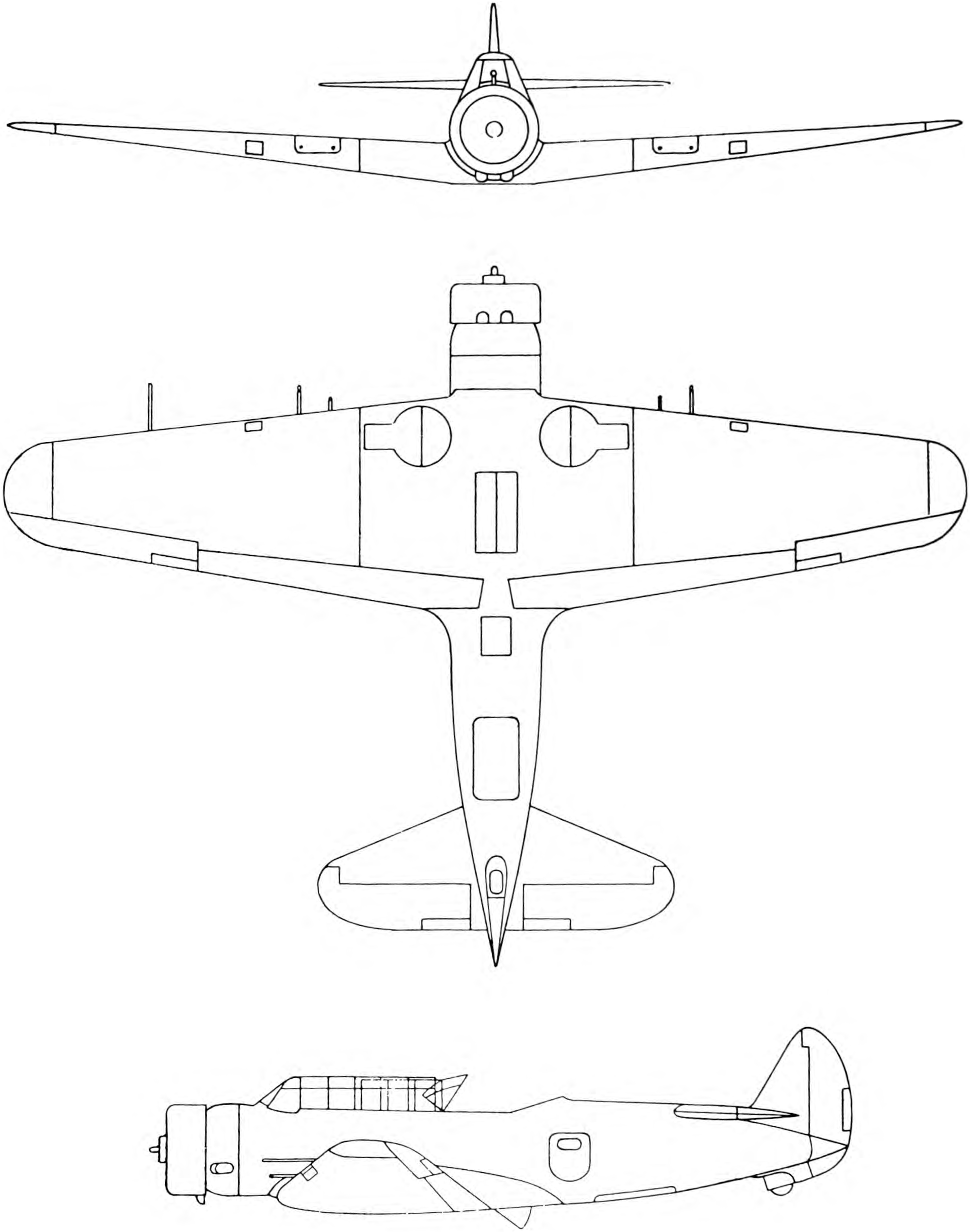
Vultee V-11 drawing

Data from U.S. Experimental & Prototype Aircraft Projects

General characteristics

- Crew: Three (pilot, observer/gunner and bombardier/photographer)
- Length: 37 ft 10 in (11.53 m)
- Wingspan: 50 ft 0 in (15.24 m)
- Height: 10 ft 0 in (3.05 m)
- Wing area: 384 sq ft (35.7 m^{2})
- Airfoil: Clark Y
- Empty weight: 6,452 lb (2,927 kg)
- Gross weight: 10,420 lb (4,726 kg)
- Max takeoff weight: 16,285 lb (7,387 kg)
- Fuel capacity: 311–330 US gallons (1,180–1,250 L)
- Powerplant: 1 × Pratt & Whitney R-1830-17 Twin Wasp 14-cylinder two-row air-cooled radial engine, 1,200 hp (890 kW)
- Propellers: 3-bladed Hamilton Standard variable-pitch propeller

Performance

- Maximum speed: 230 mph (370 km/h, 200 kn) at 6,500 ft (2,000 m)
- Cruise speed: 207 mph (333 km/h, 180 kn)
- Minimum control speed: 80 mph (130 km/h, 70 kn)
- Range: 1,110 mi (1,790 km, 960 nmi) with 1,080 lb (490 kg) of bombs
- Ferry range: 1,350 mi (2,170 km, 1,170 nmi)
- Service ceiling: 20,500 ft (6,200 m)
- Rate of climb: 1,320 ft/min (6.7 m/s)

Armament

- Guns:
  - 4 x forward-firing .30 in (7.62 mm) machine guns in wings
  - 1 x dorsal .30 in (7.62 mm) machine gun
  - 1 x ventral .30 in (7.62 mm) machine gun
- Bombs: 6 x 30 lb (14 kg) in cells semi-recessed in wing center section and 1,100 lb (500 kg) externally

== See also ==
Related development

- Vultee V-1

Aircraft of comparable role, configuration, and era

- Fairey Battle
- Heinkel He 70
- Mitsubishi Ki-30
- Neman R-10
- Northrop A-17
- PZL.23 Karaś

Related lists

- List of aircraft of World War II
- List of military aircraft of the United States
