= Alvah Leigh Powell =

Alvah Powell
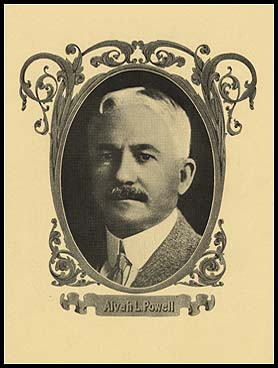
- Born: Alvah Leigh Powell; April 10, 1863; Vicksburg, Mississippi, United States
- Died: October 7, 1924 (aged 61); Cleveland, Ohio United States
- Occupations: Jewelry Salesman, Insurance Agent, Inventor

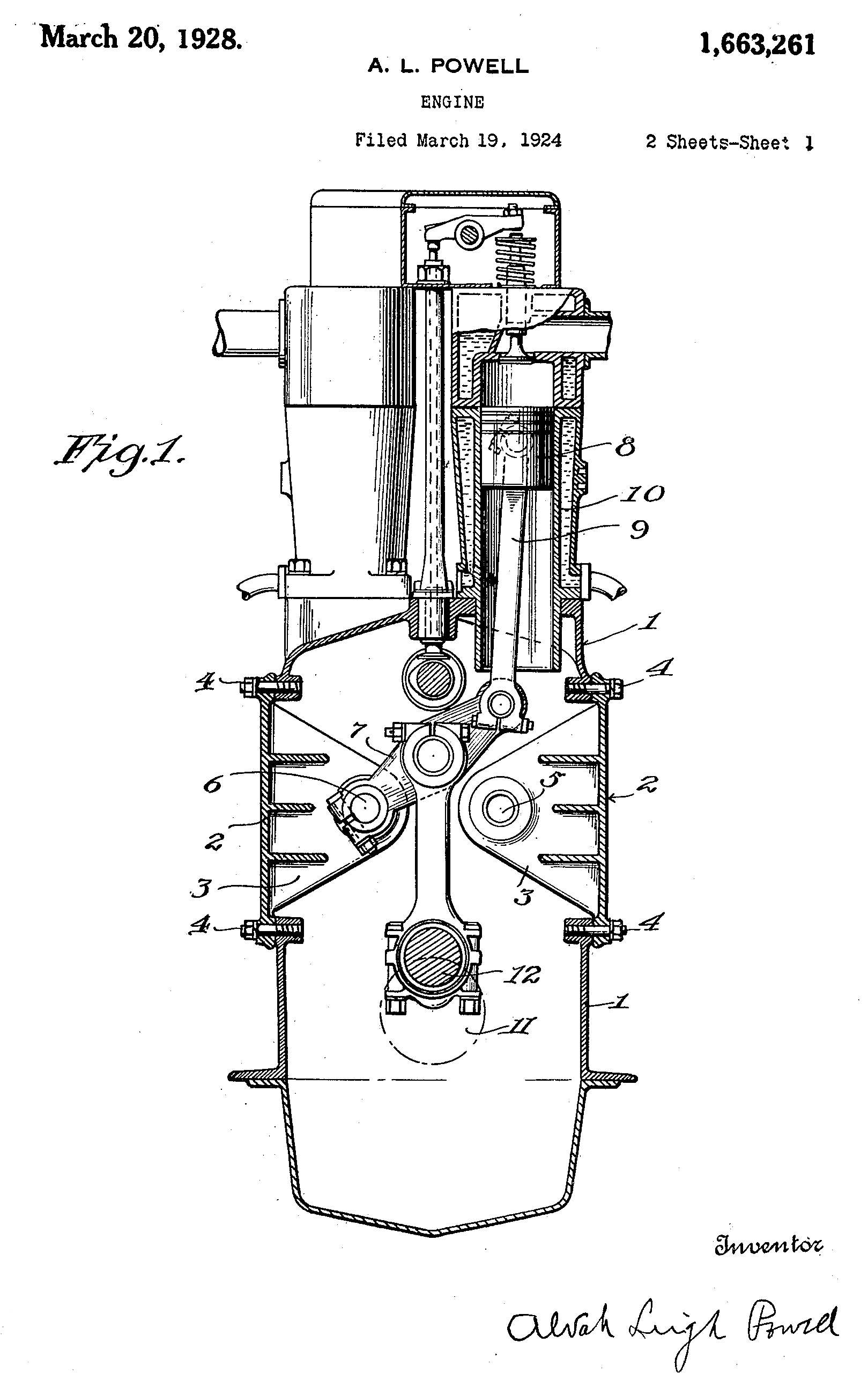
Figure 1 in US-Patent 1663261

Alvah Leigh Powell (April 10, 1863 – October 7, 1924) was an American inventor and creator of the Powell Lever Motor.

== Life ==
Alvah Leigh Powell was born to Madison S. Powell and Sarah Ann Cummings in Vicksburg, MS. He first married Ada B. Cook in 1882 in Lake Village, AR and they had six children: Ernest Allen (1883-1939), Virginia (1889-1954), Evans Alvah (1891-1954), Sarah Anne (1895-1956), Lillian Ada (1898-1963), and Helen J. (1900-1988). Powell and his family moved frequently across the mid-Southern US, with all the children except two being born in different locations in different states. Some sources indicate that Powell was a minister during these years, accounting for the frequent moves, however they are secondary sources and no primary source has been cited. Powell divorced Ada in 1903 and remarried to Bertha M. Flowers in 1905. There were no children from the second marriage.

Alvah Leigh Powell died in Cleveland, OH in 1924.

== Career as an inventor ==
Powell’s early career included a number of unrelated occupations including being president of a paper box and printing company, an insurance agent, and a jewelry salesman. The exact point of his transition to inventor and the nature of his education or training in mechanical engineering are unknown.

The Powell Power Company was incorporated by Powell and six others in Roundup, MT on May 12, 1916. The charter of the company was quite broad covering possible activities in mining, manufacturing, construction, and development of unspecified inventions, patents and trademarks. The company survived Powell, and was ultimately dissolved by the state on October 25, 1949.

Between 1919 and 1924 Powell is known to have filed 32 patent applications for a variety of improvements on internal combustion engines, transmissions, and other engine peripherals. Records indicate that he received 29 patents in this time period. The last of the granted patents was for the Powell Lever Motor. However, Powell earlier described the theory of the Powell Lever Motor in his book Powell Leverage Cycle, published in 1922.

While continuing to develop additional patents, Powell attracted investors to transform his plans into practice. These investors included such men as C. F. and R. P. Rainey of eastern Montana, substantial land owners and cattlemen, who Powell met in Washington, D.C. in 1919, and later Rexton (Rex) Rainey, the son of C. F. Despite the fact that the elder Rainey brothers had no engineering training, they moved to the Chicago area soon after meeting Powell, financed and set up an experimental machine workshop to transform the designs into actual motors.

Although Powell would die before the development was completed, the Powell Power Company, and the Powell-Rainey experimental shops would continue for another twenty years. Under chief engineer Verner J. Swanson, the company prototyped and experimented with various designs using the Powell Lever approach and made them commercially available in the late 1920s through the 1930s. Although a small number of the engines were installed in the Elcar automobile in the late 1920s, and they were used successfully in small numbers in industrial oil-pumping applications, ultimately the effort failed and the company and shops disbanded.
