= Curtiss XF14C =

1944 American prototype fighter aircraft

XF14C
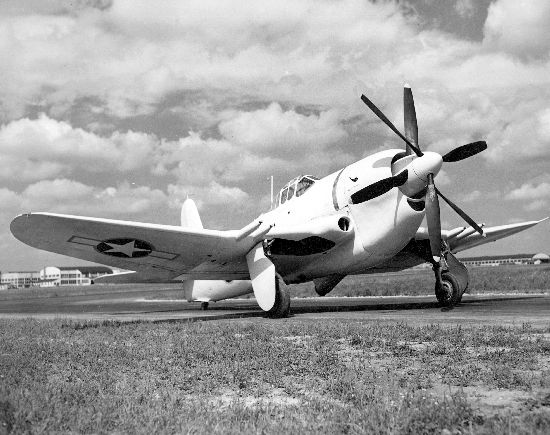

General information
- Type: Carrier-based fighter
- National origin: United States
- Manufacturer: Curtiss-Wright
- Status: Canceled
- Primary user: US Navy
- Number built: 1

History
- First flight: July 1944

The Curtiss XF14C was an American naval fighter aircraft. It was developed by Curtiss-Wright in response to a request by the United States Navy in 1941 to produce a new shipboard high-performance fighter aircraft.

== Design and development ==
In 1941 the US Navy requested a better-performing carrier-based fighter plane, to be powered by the proposed high-performance 24-cylinder, liquid-cooled, Lycoming XH-2470 Hyper engine. This was an unusual step for the Navy, which had been adamant to that time that all its aircraft use air-cooled radial engines.

On June 30, 1941 a contract for two prototype aircraft, designated the XF14C-1, was awarded to the Curtiss-Wright company. On the same date prototype development contracts were also awarded to Grumman Aircraft Engineering Corporation for the single-engine XF6F-1 and the twin engine XF7F-1, both of which would use air-cooled Pratt & Whitney R-2800 Double Wasp radial engines.

Early in the development the Navy requested better altitude performance and, in view of unsatisfactory progress in the development of the XH-2470 engine, Curtiss adapted the design of the aircraft around the new turbocharged Wright R-3350 Duplex-Cyclone air-cooled radial engine. The aircraft equipped with this eighteen-cylinder twin-row radial air-cooled engine and three bladed contra-rotating propellers was designated the XF14C-2. The XF14C-1 was canceled. Also, looking at the problems of operation at altitudes of about 40,000 feet (12,000 m), the Navy also initiated work on a third version with a pressurized cockpit designated the XF14C-3.

Ultimately, only the XF14C-2 prototype was completed, flying for the first time in July 1944. Moreover, disappointment with performance estimates and delays with the availability of the XR-3350-16 engine coupled with the evaporating tactical need for an extremely high-altitude fighter led to cancellation of the development.

== Specifications (XF14C-2) ==
Data from Curtiss Aircraft 1907–1947

General characteristics

- Crew: 1
- Length: 37 ft 9 in (11.51 m)
- Wingspan: 46 ft 0 in (14.02 m)
- Height: 17 ft 0 in (5.18 m)
- Wing area: 375 sq ft (34.8 m^{2})
- Empty weight: 10,531 lb (4,777 kg)
- Gross weight: 14,950 lb (6,781 kg)
- Powerplant: 1 × Wright XR-3350-16 eighteen cylinder twin row air-cooled radial engine
- Propellers: 6-bladed contra-rotating constant-speed propeller

Performance

- Maximum speed: 418 mph (673 km/h, 363 kn) at 32,000 ft (9,800 m)
- Cruise speed: 172 mph (277 km/h, 149 kn)
- Range: 1,530 mi (2,460 km, 1,330 nmi)
- Service ceiling: 39,800 ft (12,100 m)
- Rate of climb: 2,700 ft/min (14 m/s)

Armament

- Guns: 4 × wing mounted 20 mm (0.8 in) cannon (planned)

== See also ==
Aircraft of comparable role, configuration, and era

- Boeing F8B
- Hawker Sea Fury
- Focke-Wulf Ta 152H
- Nakajima Ki-87

Related lists

- List of fighter aircraft
- List of United States Navy aircraft designations (pre-1962)
