= Lycoming Engines =

Manufacturer of aircraft engines

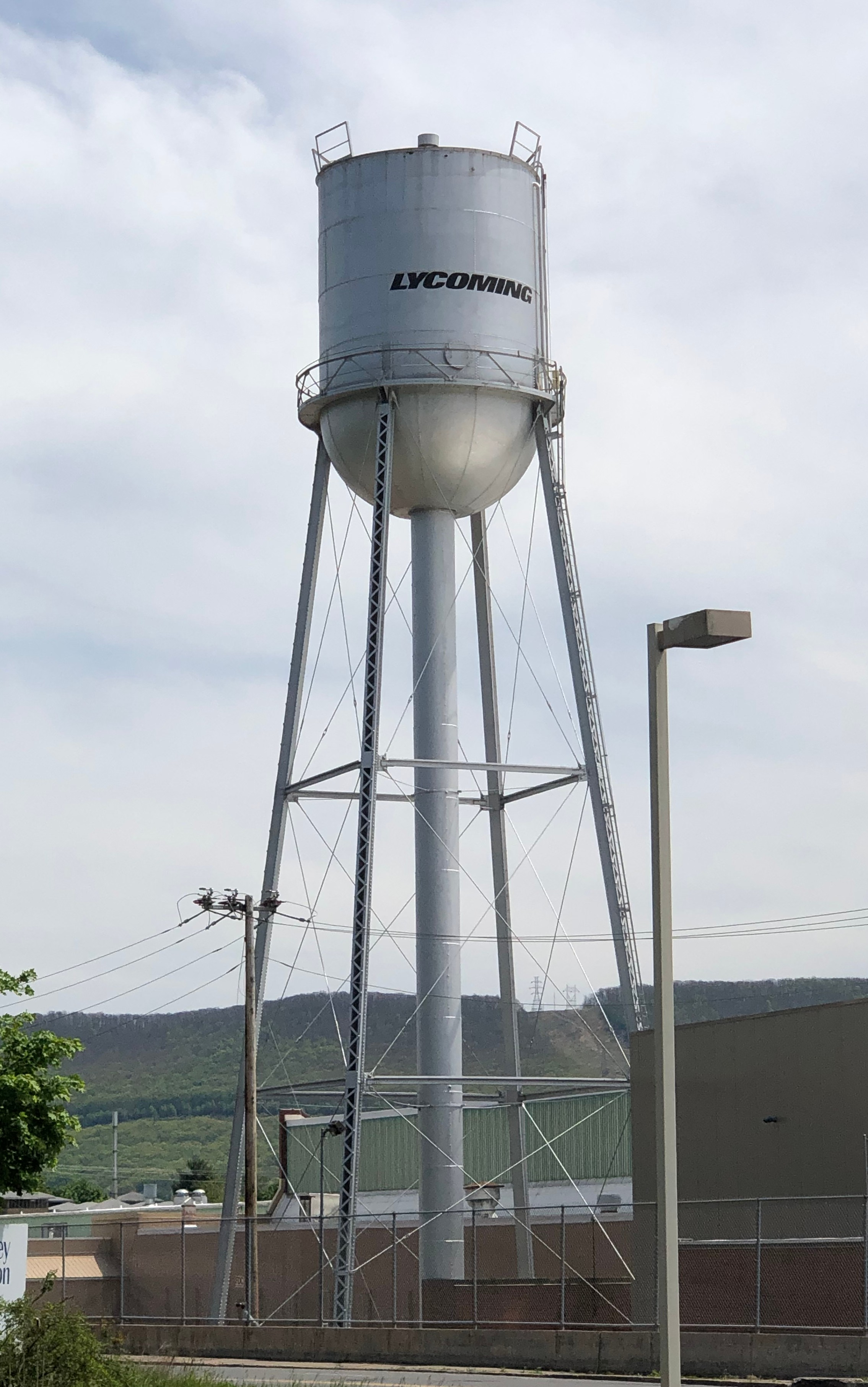
- Lycoming water tower in Williamsport, Pennsylvania
- Industry: Aerospace industry
- Founded: 1845; 181 years ago
- Founder: Ellen Louise Demorest
- Headquarters: Williamsport, Pennsylvania, U.S.
- Parent: Auburn Automobile (1927–1929); AVCO (1929–1985); Textron (1985–present)
- Website: lycoming.com

Lycoming Engines is a major American manufacturer of aircraft engines. With a factory in Williamsport, Pennsylvania, Lycoming produces a line of horizontally opposed, air-cooled, four, six and eight-cylinder engines.

The company has built more than 325,000 piston aircraft engines and powers more than half the world's general aviation fleet, both rotary and fixed wing.

Lycoming has been a principal pioneer of turbine engines for medium and large helicopters, and has also produced engines for small jetliners and business jets.

Lycoming is an operating division of Avco Corporation, itself a subsidiary of Textron.

== History ==
=== Sewing machines, bicycles and fashion ===
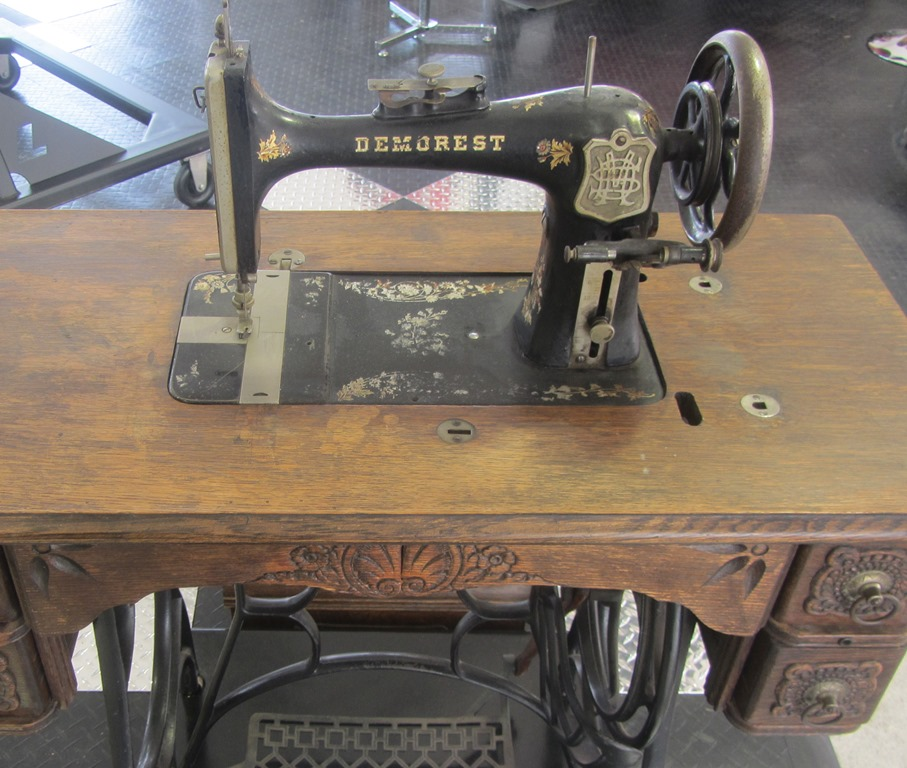
Demorest Manufacturing Company Machine

Lycoming dates its founding to 1845 by "Madame Ellen Curtis Demorest". However, the early history of the company (especially prior to 1860) is unclear; biographer Ishbel Ross notes that the marriage of Ellen Louise Curtis to William Jennings Demorest took place in 1858, somewhat later than the purported date of establishment of the company. A few years later in New York, between c. 1860 and 1887, the Demorests published fashion magazines and operated the Demorest Fashion and Sewing-Machine Company (sometimes known as the Demorest Manufacturing Company). They produced "Madame Demorest" and "Bartlett & Demorest" sewing machines and sold Ellen Demorest's innovative paper patterns for dressmaking. During this period, Ellen Demorest patented several fashion accessories, while her husband patented improvements to sewing machines and an apparatus for the vulcanization of rubber.

A Demorest print advertisement

Around 1883, Gerrit S. Scofield & Frank M. Scofield (advertising agents from New York) bought the Demorest brand and the sewing machine business (the Demorests retained the magazine business), and constructed a factory in Williamsport, Pennsylvania (in Lycoming County). At the urging of the newly established Williamsport Board of Trade, citizens invested US$100, 000 in the new manufacturing facility, which employed 250 people. The factory produced 50 to 60 sewing machines per day. With the development of the "New York Bicycle" in 1891 (designed by employee S. H. Ellis), the company diversified its product offerings. Until the early 1900s, the factory produced sewing machines, bicycles, typewriters, opera chairs and other products.

=== Engine manufacture ===
By 1907, the manufacture of sewing machines had become unprofitable for Demorest, and the company was sold and restructured as the Lycoming Foundry and Machine Company, shifting its focus toward automobile engine manufacture. In 1910, the company supplied its first automobile engine to Velie, and during the early post-World-War-I era, the company was a major supplier to Auburn (which produced the Auburn, Cord, and Duesenberg lines).

By 1920, Lycoming was producing 60,000 engines a year, with a 2,000-strong workforce. To handle the capacity, a new foundry complex was built in Williamsport that year. Eventually Lycoming became Auburn's principal supplier, and in 1927 Errett Lobban Cord bought the company, placing it under his Auburn Manufacturing umbrella group.

Among the engines Lycoming produced for Cord was an L-head straight-eight engine of 298.5 cu. in. displacement that produced 125 horsepower. This was used in the Cord L-29. Lycoming also produced a double overhead cam straight 8 used in the legendary Duesenberg J series. This powerplant produced 265 horsepower, six times the power of a contemporary Model A Ford. A supercharged version, generating 325 horsepower, was installed in the Duesenberg SJ and SSJ models.

In 1929, Lycoming produced its first aviation engine, the nine-cylinder R-680 radial. This was a fairly successful design, and was used widely in light aircraft, including Cord's Travel Air.

In the 1930s, Lycoming made a number of attempts to develop successful high-power aircraft engines. The 1 200 hp (895 kW) O-1230 was Lycoming's attempt to produce an engine based on the United States Army Air Corps hyper engine concept, and used a variety of features to produce nearly 1 hp/in^{3} (46 kW/L) of engine displacement. However, by the O-1230's entry into service, it had been surpassed by other designs and the US$500 000 investment was not recouped.

Another attempt was made to rescue the design by stacking two O-1230s to make the 2 300 hp (1 700 kW) H engine H-2470 but the only design to use it, the Vultee XP-54, never entered production. The Curtiss XF14C was originally intended to be powered by the H-2470, but the engine's poor performance led to the adoption of an alternative radial engine on the prototype. (The XF14C did not enter production.)

Undeterred by the O-1230/H-2470's failure, Lycoming turned to an even larger design, the 36-cylinder XR-7755, the largest aviation piston engine ever built. This design also experienced problems, and was only ready for use at the very end of World War II, when the aviation world was turning to turbojets and turboprop engines to power future large aircraft. There was apparently some interest in using it on the Convair B-36 Peacemaker bomber, but the 28-cylinder Pratt & Whitney R-4360 Wasp Major four-bank radial was used instead.

Through the 1920s and -30s, Lycoming had still been supplying automotive manufacturers with engines. However, these clients each slowly went out of business or switched to Continental engines for their vehicles. By 1931, the company was supplying automotive engines to only three companies: Auburn, Cord and Duesenburg, still all under the control of Cord. These companies closed their doors in 1937, after which Lycoming switched to exclusively designing and producing engines for aviation. In the meantime, the Smith Engineering Corporation, an early manufacturer of controllable pitch propellers had been purchased by Cord and moved to Williamsport.

In 1939 Cord re-organized all of his aviation holdings into the AVCO group, at which point the engine manufacturing company became "AVCO Lycoming". It also leased the government-owned Stratford Army Engine Plant in Stratford, Connecticut, and produced Wright radials under license. After the war, this plant was converted to produce the T53 turboshaft engine, one of its more successful designs. From this point on the piston and turbine engine lines remained separate, with the piston lines being built in the original Williamsport factories, and turbines in Stratford.

By 1961, Lycoming produced 600 to 700 engines per month. Its most successful post-war products were a series of air-cooled flat-4 and flat-6 general aviation engines. Most famous among these are the O-320 and O-360 four-cylinder engines, and the O-540 six-cylinder engine. Many light aircraft are powered by versions of these engines, with power ratings in the 100–360 hp (75–270 kW) range. Engines in this series also include the O-235 four-, O-580 six- and O-720 eight-cylinder engines, and the advanced turbocharged and fuel-injected 450 hp (340 kW) TIGO-541 variant of the venerable (carbureted) O-540.

In the early 1980s, the general aviation market suddenly diminished and Lycoming's piston engine business was significantly impacted. Attempts were made to move some of the turbine production to Williamsport, but this led to a series of quality control problems and eventually it was abandoned.

Another attempt to rescue Williamsport was made in introducing the "radical" SCORE engine, a Wankel engine originally developed through a joint venture between Curtiss-Wright and John Deere. Curtiss-Wright lost interest in the design just as it was maturing and sold its interests in the project to Deere, which brought in Lycoming to sell the developed engine into the aviation markets. It was guaranteed a startup run by Cessna, also owned by Textron. Just as production was ready to start, Cessna announced it was halting its small-aircraft business for an indefinite period, and SCORE was cancelled. The remains of the Deere licenses were later purchased by Rotary Power International, which briefly produced a 340 hp (254 kW) version.

Textron purchased the company in 1985. In 1994, Textron sold the Lycoming Turbine Engine Division, located in Stratford, Connecticut, to AlliedSignal, who merged it with the Garrett Engine Division of AlliedSignal as part of AlliedSignal Aerospace, later becoming part of Honeywell Aerospace in 1999. Textron retained piston engine production in Williamsport.

Lycomings continue to power new light aircraft by fellow Textron division, Cessna Aircraft, and by Piper, Cirrus, Diamond, and others. Lycomings remain a popular line of engines for U.S. Experimental / Amateur-Built (E/A-B) aircraft, surpassing the 5 next-most-popular brands, combined.

== Products ==
The aircraft piston engine prefixes are:

- A—Aerobatic (dry sump)
- AE—Aerobatic (wet sump)
- D—Diesel
- E—Electronic
- G—Geared (reduction gear)
- H—Helicopter
- I—Fuel injected
- L—Left hand rotation crankshaft
- M—Designed for unmanned drone
- O—Opposed cylinders
- R—Radial cylinders
- S—Supercharged
- T—Turbocharged
- V—Vertical installation (usually for helicopters)
- X—X-type engine
- Y—Experimental

=== Piston engines ===
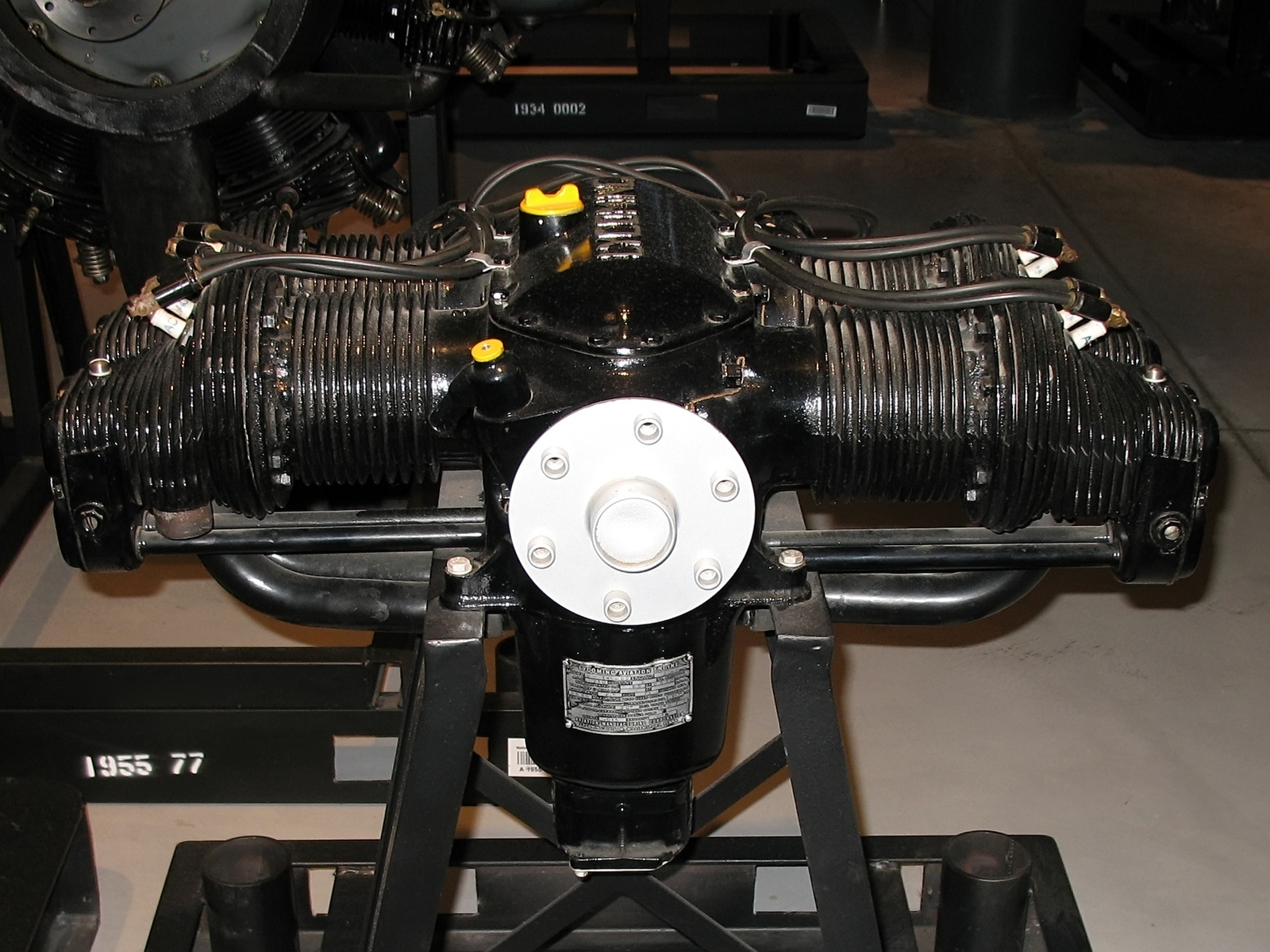
O-145-B2

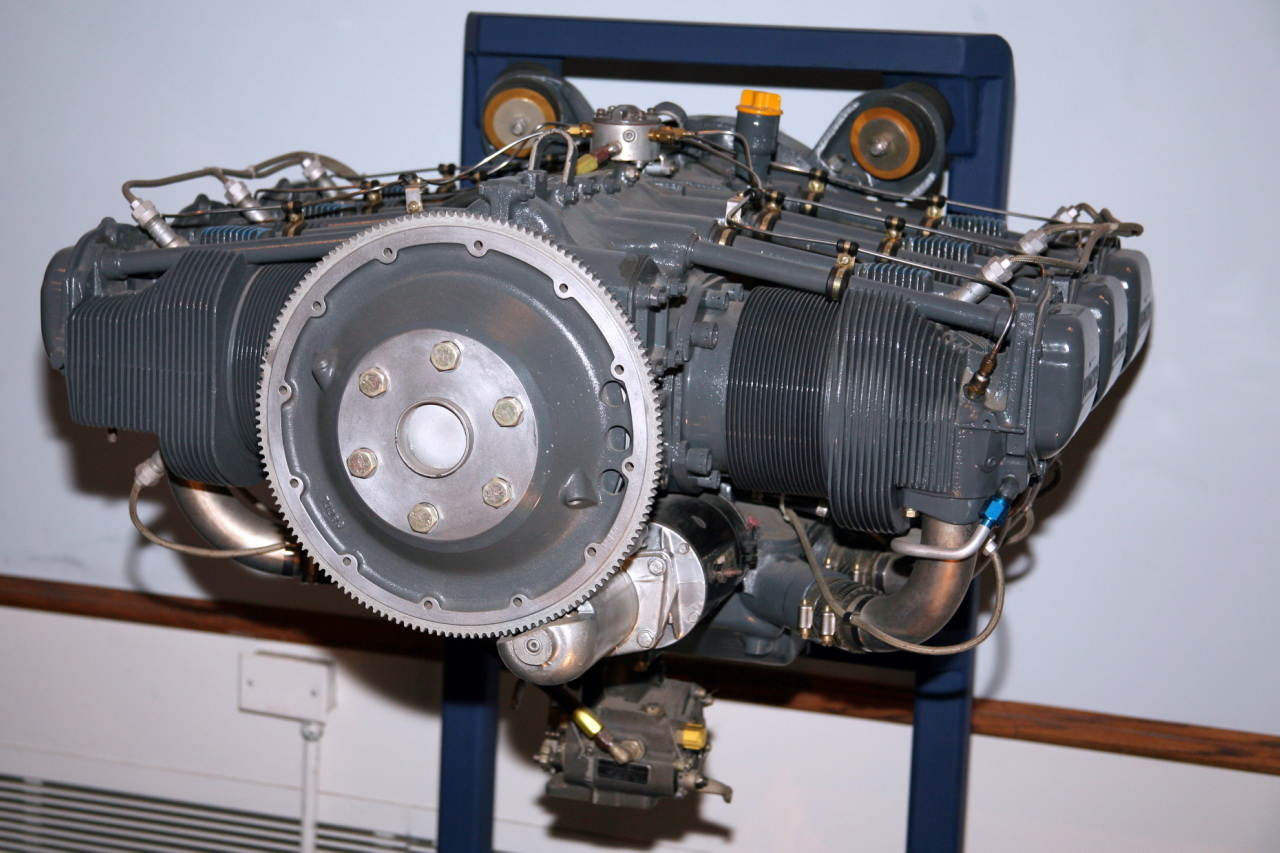
AEIO-540-D4A5

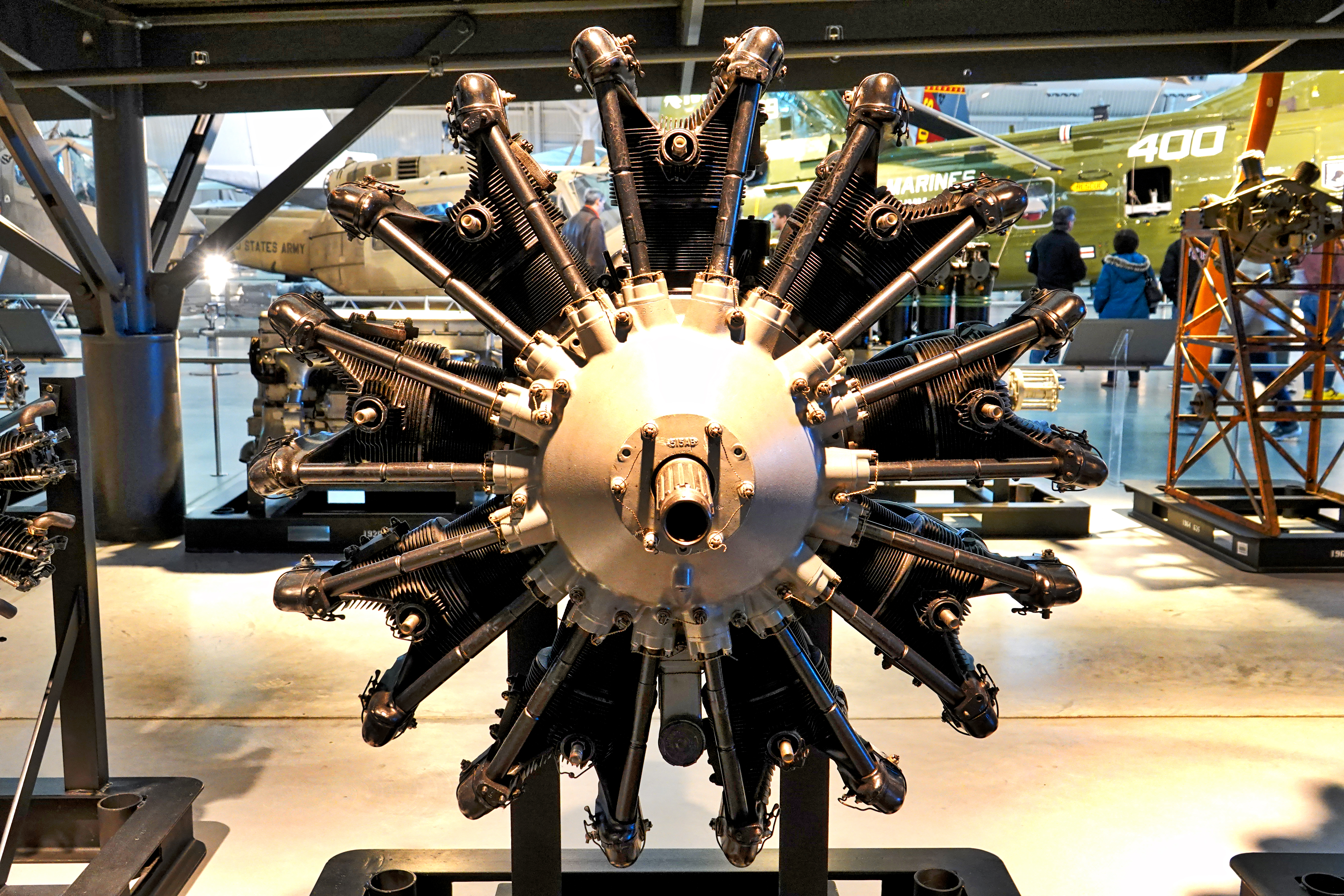
R-680

Model name	Config- uration	Displacement	Power	Intro- duction
Lycoming DEL-120	I4	117 cu in (1.92 L)	205 hp	2013
Lycoming O-145	O4	144.5 cu in (2.37 L)	55 hp	1938
Lycoming IO-233	O4	233.3 cu in (3.82 L)	100 hp	2008
Lycoming O-235	O4	233.3 cu in (3.82 L)	100 hp	1942
Lycoming O-290	O4	289 cu in (4.74 L)	140 hp	1942
Lycoming O-320	O4	319.8 cu in (5.24 L)	150 hp	1953
Lycoming O-340	O4	340.4 cu in (5.58 L)	170 hp	1954
Lycoming O-360	O4	361 cu in (5.92 L)	180 hp	1955
Lycoming IO-360	O4	361 cu in (5.92 L)	200 hp	1963
Lycoming IO-390	O4	389 cu in (6.37 L)	210 hp	2009
Lycoming O-435	O6	424 cu in (6.95 L)	212 hp	1942
Lycoming O-480	O6	479.6 cu in (7.86 L)	340 hp	1954
Lycoming O-540	O6	541.5 cu in (8.87 L)	300 hp	1957
Lycoming TIO-541	O6	541.5 cu in (8.87 L)	310 hp	1965
Lycoming IO-580	O6	583 cu in (9.55 L)	300 hp	1997
Lycoming GSO-580	O8	578 cu in (9.47 L)	400 hp	1948
Lycoming R-680	R9	680 cu in (11.14 L)	330 hp	1930
Lycoming IO-720	O8	721 cu in (11.82 L)	400 hp	1961
Lycoming O-1230	O12	1,233.9 cu in (20.22 L)	1000 hp	
Lycoming H-2470	H24	2,467.8 cu in (40.44 L)	2,300 hp	
Lycoming XR-7755	IR36	7,756.3 cu in (127.10 L)	5,000 hp	

=== Turbine engines ===
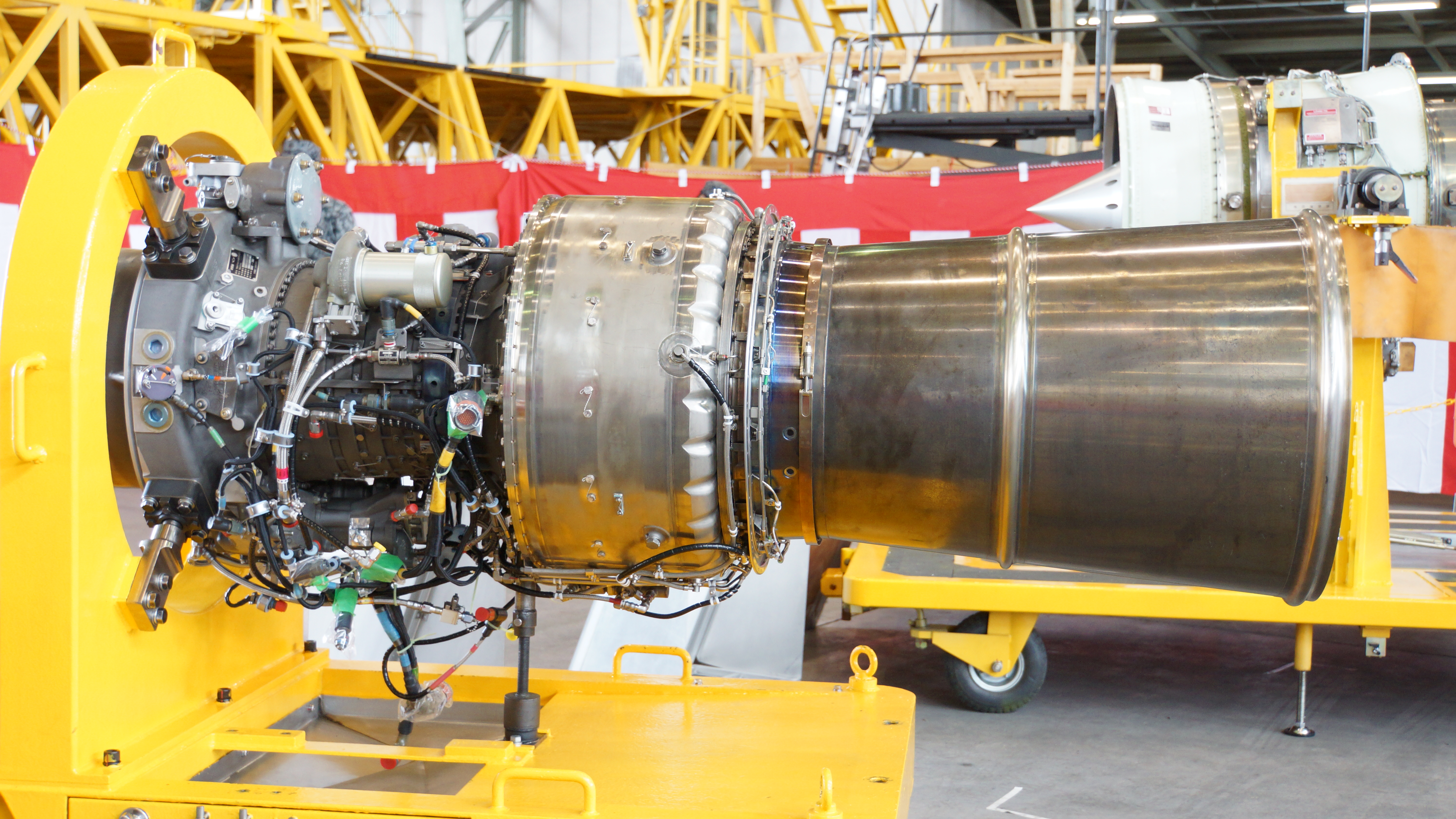
T55-K-712

Lycoming was one of the principal pioneers of turbine engines -- turboshaft to be precise—for medium- and heavy-lift helicopters, some of which have found other applications as well. Its 1,400 horsepower (1,000 kW) T53 hybrid free turbine / shaft turbine engine initially powered the Bell UH-1 "Huey", and Lycoming's 4,000 horsepower (3,000 kW) T55 is the main power for the twin-turbine, twin-rotor Boeing CH-47 Chinook. Lycoming turbines have powered other helicopters, also.

Variants and derivatives have powered various turboprop and turbofan aircraft, as well, including the OV-1 Mohawk military aircraft, BAe 146 jetliner, Canadair Challenger business jet, and others.

Model name	Configuration	Power
Lycoming T53	Turboshaft	1,451 hp
Lycoming T55	Turboshaft	4,867 hp
Lycoming PLF1		
Lycoming LTS101/LPT101	Turboshaft/Turboprop	675 hp
Lycoming ALF 502	Turbofan	6,700 lbf
Lycoming AGT1500	Gas turbine	1,500 hp
Lycoming TF40	Gas turbine	4,000 hp

== See also ==
- Continental Motors, Inc.
- Rotax
- Vericor Power Systems
