= Lycoming XH-2470 =

Aircraft engine developed by Lycoming Engines

XH-2470
- Lycoming XH-2470-7
- Type: H engine
- National origin: United States
- Manufacturer: Lycoming Engines
- First run: 1940
- Major applications: Vultee XP-54
- Developed from: Lycoming O-1230

The Lycoming XH-2470 was an H engine for aircraft designed and developed by Lycoming Engines in the 1930s. Although the engine was flown in an aircraft, it was not fitted to any aircraft selected for production. It was derived from the Lycoming O-1230 engine.

== Design and development ==
In 1932, the engineers at Lycoming Engines became aware that the United States Army Air Corps (USAAC) wanted a high-performance engine that could produce at least one horsepower per cubic inch (46 kW/L) of engine displacement. Determined to become known as a high-performance engine manufacturer, Lycoming began an experimental, high-performance engine of its own. After spending US $500,000, and after many attempts to develop a successful engine, it finally came close to the USAAC specifications with the O-1230 engine, which was a 12-cylinder liquid-cooled horizontally opposed low-profile piston engine. In 1936, the single-cylinder development tests exceeded expectations, passing its 50-hour test requirement. The full-size engine was ready for testing in 1937, and was rated at 1,000 hp. Continued development of the O-1230 reached its peak when the engine was rated at over 1,200 hp (895 kW). The O-1230 was not well received by aircraft manufacturers, because it was not very reliable at that power setting.

It was apparent that the O-1230 engine was uncompetitive with the high-performance air-cooled engines that were then becoming available. The US Navy began funding the development of the Lycoming engine. The funding enabled Lycoming's engineers to attempt rescuing the design by proposing a 24-cylinder H-configuration engine made by stacking two of the O-1230 engines, gearing them together to one common output shaft. The new engine was the H-2470. It weighed in at 2,430 pounds and produced 2,300 hp (1,700 kW) at 3,300 rpm.

== Operational history ==
The Navy specified the H-2470 for the Curtiss XF14C-1 experimental fighter. After some rigorous testing the engine's poor performance led to the substitution, before the aircraft flew, of a Wright R-3350 radial engine, which was also having technical problems but was considered to be more reliable than the H-2470. The testing program was eventually terminated due to the poor performance of the aircraft.

The USAAC was also interested in the H-2470, and installed and flew it in the Vultee XP-54 prototype fighter. The XP-54 was the only aircraft to actually use it for flight, but like the Navy's XF-14C, the XP-54 never went into production.

== Applications ==
- Vultee XP-54

=== Intended ===
- Curtiss XF14C
- Northrop N-1

== Specifications ==
=== General characteristics ===
- Type: 24-cylinder, 'H' piston engine
- Bore: 5.25 in. (133.35 mm)
- Stroke: 4.75 in. (120.65 mm)
- Displacement: 2467.8 cu in (40.44 L)
- Dry weight: 2,430 lb (1,102 kg)

=== Components ===
- Valvetrain: Dual overhead camshafts (DOHC) with four valves per cylinder
- Supercharger: Single-speed, single-stage (two-speed on the -5 variant)
- Fuel system: Carburetor (with potential for gasoline injection in testing)
- Fuel type: 100/130 octane gasoline
- Cooling system: Liquid-cooled

=== Performance ===
- Power output: 2,300 hp at 3,300 rpm
- Compression ratio: 6.5:1

== See also ==
Comparable engines

- Fairey P.24
- Napier Sabre

Related lists

- List of aircraft engines
