= Lycoming O-1230 =

O-1230
- Type: Flat engine
- National origin: United States
- Manufacturer: Lycoming Engines
- Major applications: Vultee A-19 prototype engine
- Manufactured: out of production
- Variants: Lycoming H-2470

The Lycoming O-1230 was a flat-twelve engine for aircraft designed and developed by Lycoming Engines in the 1930s. Although the engine was flown in an aircraft, it was not fitted to any aircraft selected for production. It later served as the basis for the Lycoming H-2470 engine.

== Design and development ==
In 1932, the engineers at Lycoming Engines became aware that the United States Army Air Corps (USAAC) wanted a high-performance engine that could produce at least one horsepower per cubic inch (46 kW/L) of engine displacement and that a contract had been made with Continental Motors, Inc., Lycoming's main rival in the general aviation engine market. Lycoming's management wanted to be considered for development of the next generation engine, but no USAAC development contract was signed. Still determined to become known as a high-performance engine manufacturer, Lycoming began an experimental, high-performance engine of its own. After spending US$500,000, and after many attempts to develop a successful engine, it finally came close to the USAAC specifications with the 1,200 hp (895 kW) O-1230 engine.

Lycoming's O-1230 engine design was a 12-cylinder liquid-cooled horizontally opposed low-profile piston engine that could be mounted either horizontally, buried in the wing of a multi-engine aircraft; or vertically, in the fuselage of a single-engine fighter. From 1935 the engine design proceeded at a faster pace after a number of former Continental engineers, who had become unhappy with the working conditions there, joined Lycoming.

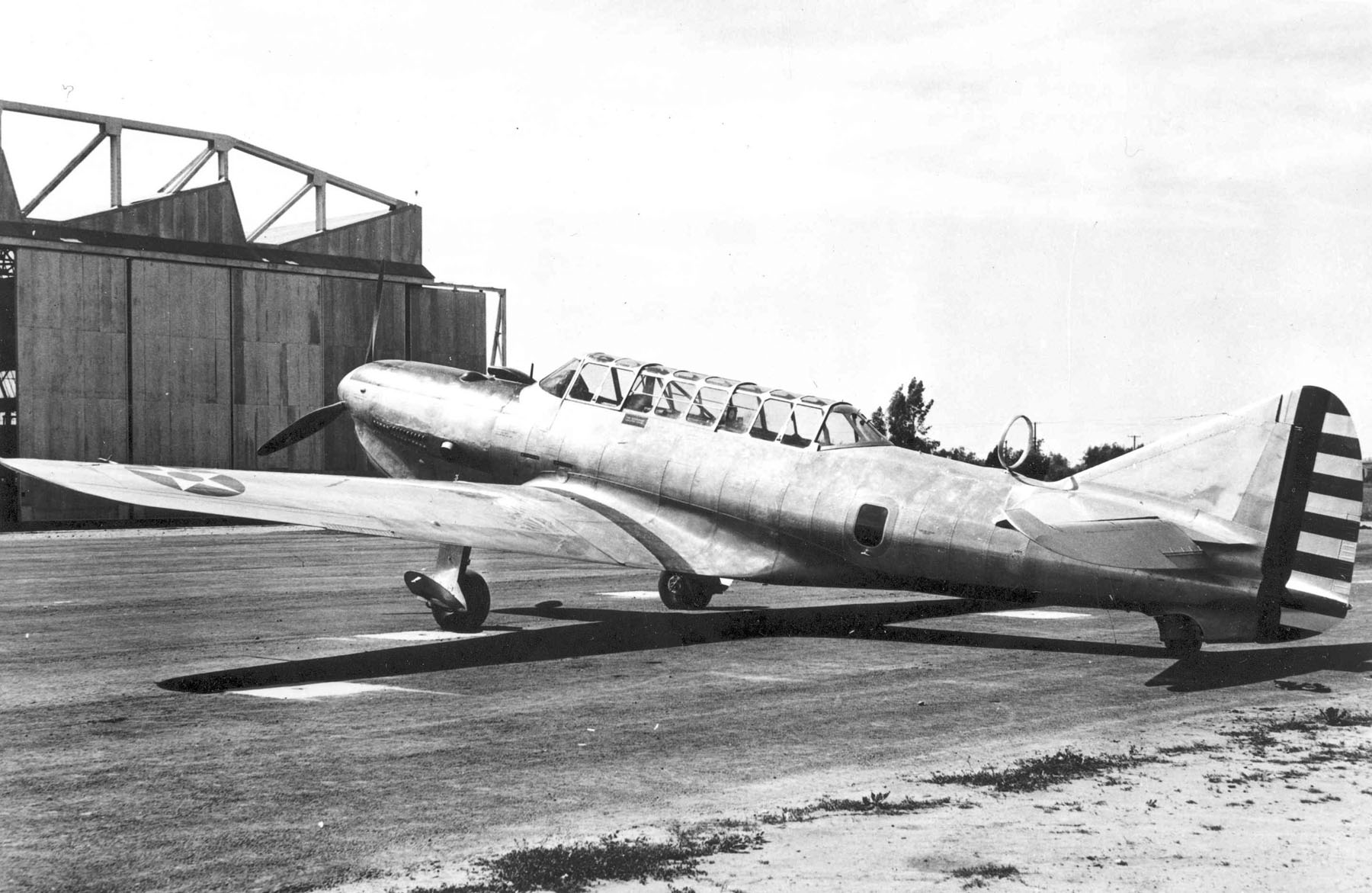
Vultee XA-19A with Lycoming O-1230 installed

The same year the USAAC became interested in the O-1230, and began supporting the engine development program. In 1936, the single-cylinder development tests exceeded expectations, passing its 50-hour test requirement. The full-size engine was ready for testing in 1937, and was rated at 1,000 hp.

The last Vultee A-19 that had been ordered by the USAAC was delivered as the XA-19A, fitted with an O-1230-1 offering 1200 hp. It first flew on May 22, 1940. This aircraft was subsequently re-engined with a Pratt & Whitney R-1830-51 and redesignated.

Continued development of the O-1230 reached its peak when the engine was rated at over 1200 hp. It was as powerful as the Allison V-1710, but with a narrower cowling than the Allison V12 engine. The O-1230 was not well received by aircraft manufacturers, because it was not very reliable at that power setting.

== Applications ==
- Vultee XA-19A

== Specifications (O-1230-1) ==
Data from White p 379

=== General characteristics ===
- Type: 12-cylinder, Geared, liquid-cooled, horizontally-opposed piston engine
- Bore: 5.25 in (133.4 mm)
- Stroke: 4.75 in (120.7 mm)
- Displacement: 1233.9 in³ (20.219 L)
- Dry weight: 1342 lb (609 kg)

=== Components ===
- Valvetrain: Overhead camshaft
- Cooling system: Liquid
- Reduction gear: 0.40
- separate cylinders
- hemispheric cylinder head design
- one-piece cylinder head for each bank

=== Performance ===
- Power output: 1000 hp@3100 rpm, 1200 hp@3400 rpm, 1,275 hp (951 kW)
- Specific power: 1.03 hp/in³
- Power-to-weight ratio: .95 hp/lb

== See also ==
Related lists

- List of aircraft engines
