= Brake-specific fuel consumption =

Measure of the fuel efficiency of internal combustion engines

Brake-specific fuel consumption (BSFC) is a measure of the fuel efficiency of any prime mover that burns fuel and produces rotational, or shaft power. It is typically used for comparing the efficiency of internal combustion engines with a shaft output.

It is the rate of fuel consumption divided by the power produced. In traditional units, it measures fuel consumption in pounds per hour divided by the brake horsepower, lb/(hp⋅h); in SI units, this corresponds to the inverse of the units of specific energy, kg/J = s^{2}/m^{2}.

It may also be thought of as power-specific fuel consumption, for this reason. BSFC allows the fuel efficiency of different engines to be directly compared.

The term "brake" here as in "brake horsepower" refers to a historical method of measuring torque (see Prony brake).

== Calculation ==
The brake-specific fuel consumption is given by,

$$\text{BSFC}= \frac{r}{P}$$

where:

$r$ is the fuel consumption rate in grams per second (g/s)
$P$ is the power produced in watts where $P = \tau \omega$ (W)

$\omega$ is the engine speed in radians per second (rad/s)
$\tau$ is the engine torque in newton metres (N⋅m)

The above values of r, $\omega$, and $\tau$ may be readily measured by instrumentation with an engine mounted in a test stand and a load applied to the running engine. The resulting units of BSFC are grams per joule (g/J)

Commonly BSFC is expressed in units of grams per kilowatt-hour (g/(kW⋅h)). The conversion factor is as follows:

BSFC [g/(kW⋅h)] = BSFC [g/J] × (3.6 × 10^{6})

The conversion between metric and imperial units is:

BSFC [g/(kW⋅h)] = BSFC [lb/(hp⋅h)] × 608.277
BSFC [lb/(hp⋅h)] = BSFC [g/(kW⋅h)] × 0.001644

== Relation to efficiency ==
To calculate the actual efficiency of an engine requires the energy density of the fuel being used.

Different fuels have different energy densities defined by the fuel's heating value. The lower heating value (LHV) is used for internal-combustion-engine-efficiency calculations because the heat at temperatures below 150 °C (300 °F) cannot be put to use.

Some examples of lower heating values for vehicle fuels are:

Certification gasoline = 18,640 BTU/lb (0.01204 kW⋅h/g)
Regular gasoline = 18,917 BTU/lb (0.0122222 kW⋅h/g)
Diesel fuel = 18,500 BTU/lb (0.0119531 kW⋅h/g)

Thus a diesel engine's efficiency = 1/(BSFC × 0.0119531) and a gasoline engine's efficiency = 1/(BSFC × 0.0122225)

== Operating values and as a cycle average statistic ==
BSFC [g/(kW⋅h)] map

Any engine will have different BSFC values at different speeds and loads. For example, a reciprocating engine achieves maximum efficiency when the intake air is unthrottled and the engine is running near its peak torque. The efficiency often reported for a particular engine, however, is not its maximum efficiency but a fuel economy cycle statistical average. For example, the cycle average value of BSFC for a gasoline engine is 322 g/(kW⋅h), translating to an efficiency of 25% (1/(322 × 0.0122225) = 0.2540). Actual efficiency can be lower or higher than the engine's average due to varying operating conditions. In the case of a production gasoline engine, the most efficient BSFC is approximately 225 g/(kW⋅h), which is equivalent to a thermodynamic efficiency of 36%.

An iso-BSFC map (fuel island plot) of a diesel engine is shown. The sweet spot at 206 BSFC has 40.6% efficiency. The x-axis is rpm; y-axis is BMEP in bar (bmep is proportional to torque)

== Engine design and class ==
BSFC numbers change a lot for different engine designs, and compression ratio and power rating. Engines of different classes like diesels and gasoline engines will have very different BSFC numbers, ranging from less than 200 g/(kW⋅h) (diesel at low speed and high torque) to more than 1,000 g/(kW⋅h) (turboprop at low power level).

== Examples for shaft engines ==
The following table takes values as an example for the specific fuel consumption of several types of engines. For specific engines values can and often do differ from the table values shown below. Energy efficiency is based on a lower heating value of 42.7 MJ/kg (84.3 g/(kW⋅h)) for diesel fuel and jet fuel, 43.9 MJ/kg (82 g/(kW⋅h)) for gasoline.

kW	HP	Year	Engine	Type	Application	lb/(hp⋅h)	g/(kW⋅h)	Efficiency
48	64	1989	Rotax 582	gasoline, 2-stroke	Aviation, Ultralight, Eurofly Fire Fox	0.699	425	19.3%
321	431	1987	PW206B/B2	turboshaft	Helicopter, EC135	0.553	336	24.4%
427	572	1987	PW207D	turboshaft	Helicopter, Bell 427	0.537	327	25.1%
500	670	1981	Arrius 2B1/2B1A-1	turboshaft	Helicopter, EC135	0.526	320	25.6%
13.1	17.8	1897	Motor 250/400	Diesel, four-stroke	Stationary industrial Diesel engine	0.533	324	26.2%
820	1,100	1960	PT6C-67C	turboshaft	Helicopter, AW139	0.490	298	27.5%
515	691	1991	Mazda R26B	Wankel, four-rotor	Race car, Mazda 787B	0.470	286	28.7%
958	1,285	1989	MTR390	turboshaft	Helicopter, Tiger	0.460	280	29.3%
84.5	113.3	1996	Rotax 914	gasoline, turbo	Aviation, Light-sport aircraft, WT9 Dynamic	0.454	276	29.7%
88	118	1942	Lycoming O-235-L	gasoline	Aviation, General aviation, Cessna 152	0.452	275	29.8%
456	612	1988	Honda RA168E	gasoline, turbo	Race car, McLaren MP4/4	0.447	272	31.6%
1,770	2,380	1973	GE T700	turboshaft	Helicopter, AH-1/UH-60/AH-64	0.433	263	31.1%
3,781	5,071	1995	PW150	turboprop	Airliner, Dash 8-400	0.433	263	31.1%
1,799	2,412	1984	RTM322-01/9	turboshaft	Helicopter, NH90	0.420	255	32.1%
63	84	1991	GM Saturn I4 engine	gasoline	Cars, Saturn S-Series	0.411	250	32.8%
150	200	2011	Ford EcoBoost	gasoline, turbo	Cars, Ford	0.403	245	33.5%
300	400	1961	Lycoming IO-720	gasoline	Aviation, General aviation, PAC Fletcher	0.4	243	34.2%
5,600	7,500	1989	GE T408	turboshaft	Helicopter, CH-53K	0.4	240	33.7%
7,000	9,400	1986	Rolls-Royce MT7	gas turbine	Hovercraft, SSC	0.3998	243.2	34.7%
2,000	2,700	1945	Wright R-3350 Duplex-Cyclone	gasoline, turbo-compound	Aviation, Commercial aviation; B-29, Constellation, DC-7	0.380	231	35.5%
57	76	2003	Toyota 1NZ-FXE	gasoline	Car, Toyota Prius	0.370	225	36.4%
134	180	2013	Lycoming DEL-120	Diesel four-stroke	MQ-1C Gray Eagle	0.36	219	38.5%
8,251	11,065	2005	Europrop TP400	turboprop	Airbus A400M	0.350	213	39.6%
550	740	1931	Junkers Jumo 204	diesel two-stroke, turbo	Aviation, Commercial aviation, Junkers Ju 86	0.347	211	40%
36,000	48,000	2002	Rolls-Royce Marine Trent	turboshaft	Marine propulsion	0.340	207	40.7%
2,340	3,140	1949	Napier Nomad	Diesel-compound	Concept Aircraft engine	0.340	207	40.7%
165	221	2000	Volkswagen 3.3 V8 TDI	Diesel	Car, Audi A8	0.337	205	41.1%
2,013	2,699	1940	Deutz DZ 710	Diesel two-stroke	Concept Aircraft engine	0.330	201	41.9%
42,428	56,897	1993	GE LM6000	turboshaft	Marine propulsion, Electricity generation	0.329	200.1	42.1%
130	170	2007	BMW N47 2L	Diesel	Cars, BMW	0.326	198	42.6%
88	118	1990	Audi 2.5L TDI	Diesel	Car, Audi 100	0.326	198	42.6%
66	89	1992	VAG 1.9TDI 66 kW	Diesel 4-stroke	Car, Audi 80, VW Golf/Passat	0.324	197	42.8%
368	493	2017	MAN D2676LF51	Diesel 4-stroke	Truck/Bus	0.314	191	44.1%
620	830		Scania AB DC16 078A	Diesel 4-stroke	Electricity generation	0.312	190	44.4%
1,200	1,600	early 1990s	Wärtsilä 6L20	Diesel 4-stroke	Marine propulsion	0.311	189.4	44.5%
375	503	2019	MAN D2676LF78	Diesel 4-stroke	Truck/Bus	0.302	184	45.8%
283	380		Scania DC13 541A 283 kW	Diesel 4-stroke	Industrial	0.289	176	47.9%
3,600	4,800		MAN Diesel 6L32/44CR	Diesel 4-stroke	Marine propulsion, Electricity generation	0.283	172	49%
4,200	5,600	2015	Wärtsilä W31	Diesel 4-stroke	Marine propulsion, Electricity generation	0.271	165	51.1%
34,320	46,020	1998	Wärtsilä-Sulzer RTA96-C	Diesel 2-stroke	Marine propulsion, Electricity generation	0.263	160	52.7%
27,060	36,290		MAN Diesel S80ME-C9.4-TII	Diesel 2-stroke	Marine propulsion, Electricity generation	0.254	154.5	54.6%
34,350	46,060		MAN Diesel G95ME-C9	Diesel 2-stroke	Marine propulsion	0.254	154.5	54.6%
605,000	811,000	2016	General Electric 9HA	Combined cycle gas turbine	Electricity generation	0.223	135.5 (eq.)	62.2%
640,000	860,000	2021	General Electric 7HA.3	Combined cycle gas turbine	Electricity generation (proposed)	0.217	131.9 (eq.)	63.9%

Turboprop efficiency is only good at high power; SFC increases dramatically for approach at low power (30% P_{max}) and especially at idle (7% P_{max}) :

2,050 kW Pratt & Whitney Canada PW127 turboprop (1996)
Mode	Power	fuel flow	SFC	Energy efficiency
Nominal idle (7%)	192 hp (143 kW)	3.06 kg/min (405 lb/h)	1,282 g/(kW⋅h) (2.108 lb/(hp⋅h))	6.6%
Approach (30%)	825 hp (615 kW)	5.15 kg/min (681 lb/h)	502 g/(kW⋅h) (0.825 lb/(hp⋅h))	16.8%
Max cruise (78%)	2,132 hp (1,590 kW)	8.28 kg/min (1,095 lb/h)	312 g/(kW⋅h) (0.513 lb/(hp⋅h))	27%
Max climb (80%)	2,192 hp (1,635 kW)	8.38 kg/min (1,108 lb/h)	308 g/(kW⋅h) (0.506 lb/(hp⋅h))	27.4%
Max contin. (90%)	2,475 hp (1,846 kW)	9.22 kg/min (1,220 lb/h)	300 g/(kW⋅h) (0.493 lb/(hp⋅h))	28.1%
Take-off (100%)	2,750 hp (2,050 kW)	9.9 kg/min (1,310 lb/h)	290 g/(kW⋅h) (0.477 lb/(hp⋅h))	29.1%

== See also ==
- Fuel economy in automobiles
- Energy-efficient driving
- Fuel management systems
- Marine fuel management
- Thrust specific fuel consumption
