= Aircraft diesel engine =

Aircraft engine operating on the Diesel principle

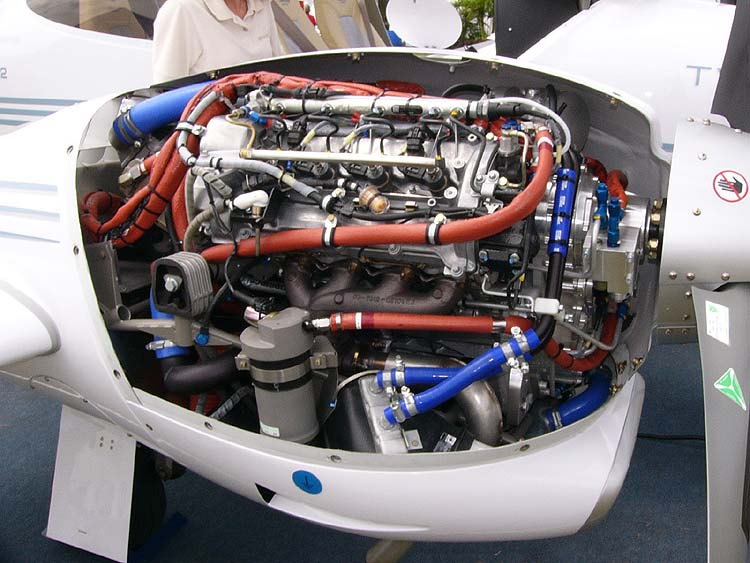
Thielert Centurion aircraft diesel engine

The aircraft diesel engine or aero diesel is a diesel-powered aircraft engine. They were used in airships and tried in aircraft in the late 1920s and 1930s, but were never widely adopted until recently. Their main advantages are their excellent specific fuel consumption, the reduced flammability and somewhat higher density of their fuel, but these have been outweighed by a combination of inherent disadvantages compared to gasoline-fueled or turboprop engines. The ever-rising cost of avgas and doubts about its future availability have spurred a resurgence in aircraft diesel engine production in the early 2010s.

Using diesel engines in aircraft is additionally advantageous from the standpoint of environmental protection as well as the protection of human health, since the tetraethyllead antiknock ingredient of avgas has long been known to be highly toxic as well as polluting.

== Development ==
=== Early diesel aircraft ===
A number of manufacturers built diesel aero engines in the 1920s and 1930s; the best known were the Packard air-cooled radial, and the Junkers Jumo 205, which was moderately successful, but proved unsuitable for combat use in World War II. The Blohm & Voss BV 138 trimotor maritime patrol flying boat, however, was powered with the more developed Junkers Jumo 207 powerplant, and was more successful with its trio of diesel Jumo 207s conferring upwards of a maximum 2,100 km (1,300 mile) combat radius upon the nearly 300 examples of the BV 138 built during World War II.

The first successful diesel engine developed specifically for aircraft was the Packard DR-980 radial diesel of 1928–1929, which was laid out in the familiar air-cooled radial format similar to Wright and Pratt & Whitney designs, and was contemporary with the Beardmore Tornado used in the R101 airship. The use of a diesel had been specified for its low fire risk fuel. The first successful flight of a diesel powered aircraft was made on September 18, 1928, in a Stinson model SM-1DX Detroiter registration number X7654. Around 1936 the heavier but less thirsty diesel engines were preferred over gasoline engines when flight time was over only 6–7 hours.

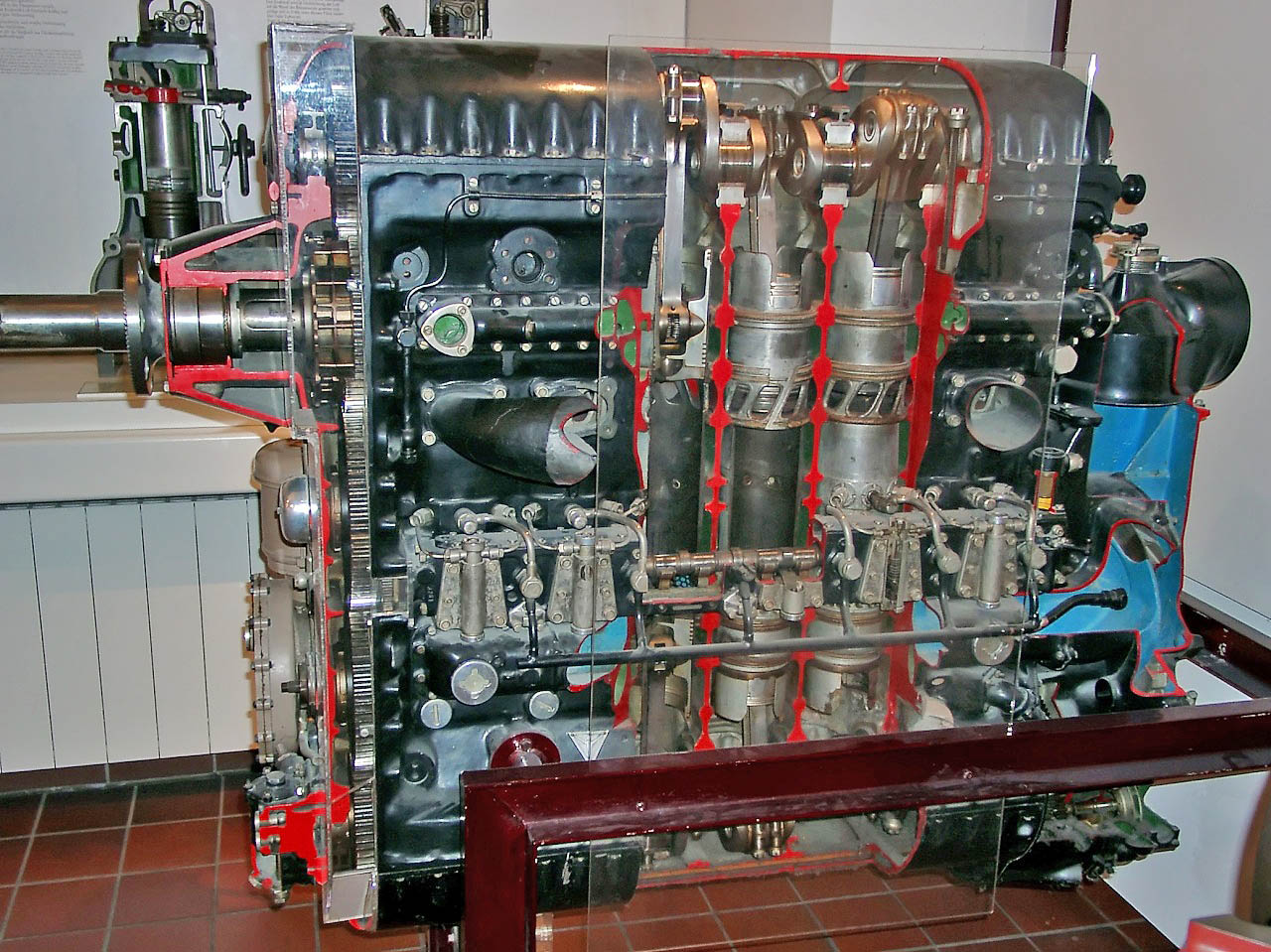
Jumo 205 opposed-piston engine, sectioned

Entering service in the early 1930s, the two-stroke Junkers Jumo 205 opposed-piston engine was much more widely used than previous aero diesels. It was moderately successful in its use in the Blohm & Voss Ha 139 and even more so in airship use. In Britain Napier & Son license-built the larger Junkers Jumo 204 as the Napier Culverin, but it did not see production use in this form. A Daimler-Benz diesel engine was also used in Zeppelins, including the ill-fated LZ 129 Hindenburg. This engine proved unsuitable in military applications and subsequent German aircraft engine development concentrated on gasoline and jet engines.

The Soviet World War II-era four-engine strategic bomber Petlyakov Pe-8 was built with Charomskiy ACh-30 diesel engines; but just after the war's end, both its diesels, and gasoline-fueled Mikulin inline V12 engines for surviving Pe-8 airframes were replaced with Shvetsov-designed radial gasoline engines because of efficiency concerns. The Yermolaev Yer-2 long-range medium bomber was also built with Charomskiy diesel engines.

Other manufacturers also experimented with diesel engines in this period, such as the French Bloch (later Dassault Aviation), whose MB203 bomber prototype used Clerget diesels of radial design. The Royal Aircraft Establishment developed an experimental compression ignition (diesel) version of the Rolls-Royce Condor in 1932, flying it in a Hawker Horsley for test purposes.

=== Postwar development ===
Interest in diesel engines in the postwar period was sporadic. The lower power-to-weight ratio of diesels, particularly compared to turboprop engines, weighed against the diesel engine. With fuel available cheaply and most research interest in turboprops and jets for high-speed airliners, diesel-powered aircraft virtually disappeared. The stagnation of the general aviation market in the 1990s saw a massive decline in the development of any new aircraft engine types.

Napier & Son in Britain had developed the Napier Culverin, a derivative of the Junkers Jumo 205, before World War II, and took up aero diesel engines again in the 1950s. The British Air Ministry supported the development of the 2,200 kW (3,000 hp) Napier Nomad, a combination of piston and turboprop engines, which was exceptionally efficient in terms of brake specific fuel consumption, but judged too bulky and complex and canceled in 1955.

=== Modern developments ===
Several factors have emerged to change this equation. First, a number of new manufacturers of general aviation aircraft developing new designs have emerged. Second, in Europe in particular, avgas has become very expensive. Third, in several (particularly remote) locations, avgas is harder to obtain than diesel fuel. Finally, automotive diesel technologies have improved greatly in recent years, offering higher power-to-weight ratios more suitable for aircraft application.

Certified diesel-powered light planes are currently available, and a number of companies are developing new engine and aircraft designs for the purpose. Many of these run on readily available jet fuel (kerosene), or on conventional automotive diesel.

Simulations indicate lower maximum payload due to the heavier engine, but also longer range at medium payload.

== Applications ==
=== Airships ===
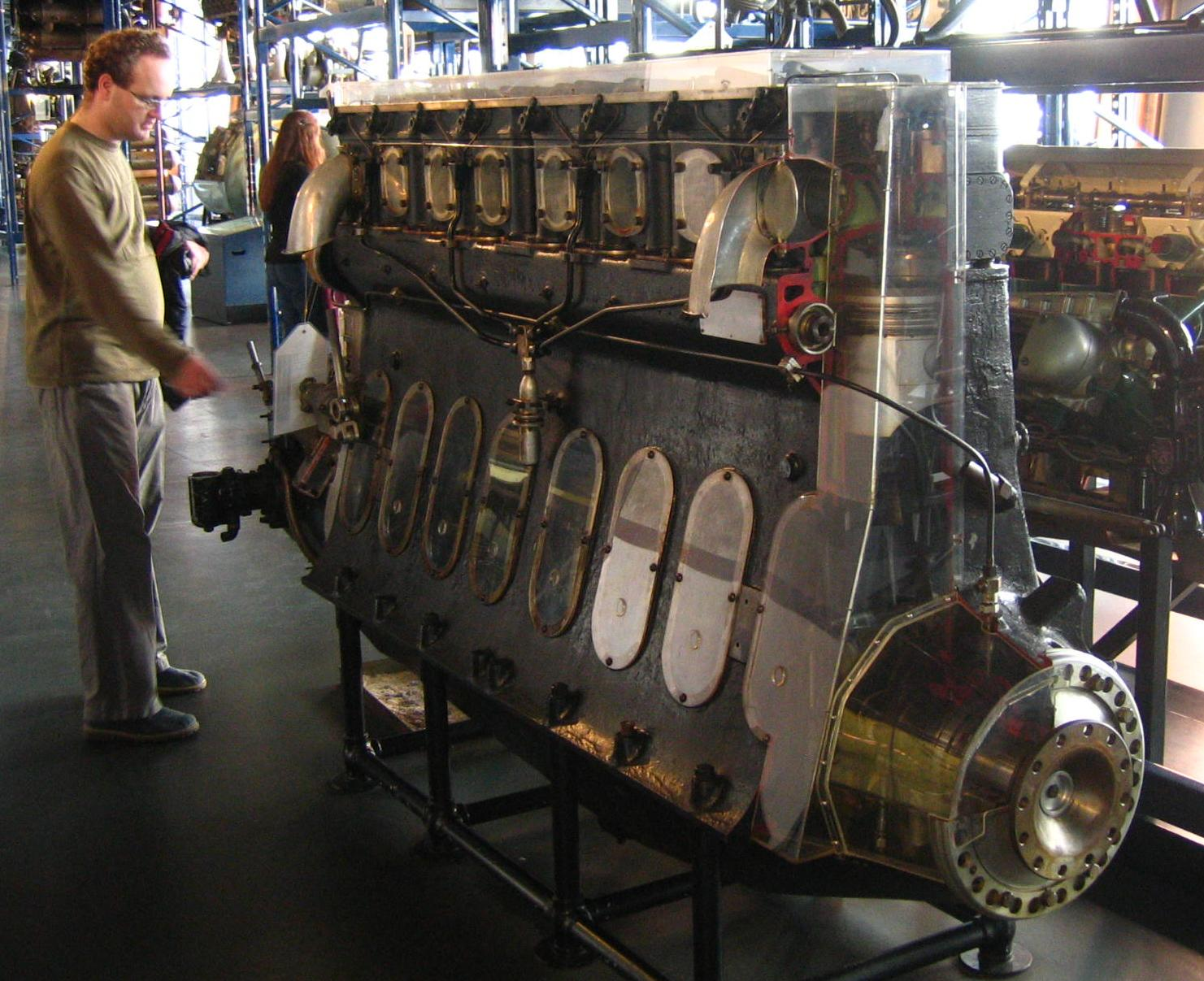
The Beardmore Tornado

The zeppelins LZ 129 Hindenburg and LZ 130 Graf Zeppelin II were propelled by reversible diesel engines. The direction of operation was changed by shifting gears on the camshaft. From full power forward, the engines could be brought to a stop, changed over, and brought to full power in reverse in less than 60 seconds.

Nevil Shute Norway wrote that the demonstration flight of the airship R100 was changed from India to Canada, "when she got petrol engines, because it was thought that a flight to the tropics with petrol on board would be too hazardous. It is curious after over twenty years to recall how afraid everyone was of petrol in those days (c. 1929), because since then aeroplanes with petrol engines have done innumerable hours of flying in the tropics, and they don't burst into flames on every flight. I think the truth is that everyone was diesel-minded in those days; it seemed as if the diesel engine for aeroplanes was only just around the corner, with the promise of great fuel economy".

Hence, the ill-fated diesel-engined R101 — which crashed in 1930 — was to fly to India, though her diesel engines had petrol starter engines, and there had only been time to replace one with a diesel starter engine. The R101 used the Beardmore Tornado aero diesel engine, with two of the five engines reversible by an adjustment to the camshaft. This engine was developed from an engine used in railcars.

== Certified engines ==
Manufacturer	Model	Certification	Power	Prop. RPM	Weight	Specific power
Technify Motors	TAE 125	2007-03-06	114 kW (153 hp)	2309	134 kg (295 lb)	0.85 kW/kg (0.52 hp/lb)
Technify Motors	TAE 125-02-125	2020-07-22	125 kW (168 hp)	2309	156 kg (344 lb)	0.8 kW/kg (0.49 hp/lb)
DieselJet	TDA CR 1.9 8V	2010-06-11	118 kW (160 hp)	2450	205 kg (452 lb)	0.58 kW/kg (0.35 hp/lb)
Austro Engine	E4P	2015-03-26	132 kW (177 hp)	2300	185 kg (408 lb)	0.71 kW/kg (0.43 hp/lb)
DeltaHawk	DH180	2023-05	134.2 kW (180 HP)	2700	162 kg (357 lb)	0.83 kW/kg (0.50 hp/lb)
DieselJet	TDA CR 2.0 16V	2016-03-08	142 kW (193 hp)	2306	219 kg (483 lb)	0.65 kW/kg (0.40 hp/lb)
SMA	SR305-230	2001-04-20	169 kW (227 hp)	2200	195 kg (430 lb)	0.87 kW/kg (0.53 hp/lb)
SMA	SR305-260	2019-02-15	194 kW (260 hp)	2200	206 kg (454 lb)	0.94 kW/kg (0.57 hp/lb)
Technify Motors	Centurion 3.0	2017-06-20	221 kW (296 hp)	2340	265 kg (584 lb)	0.83 kW/kg (0.50 hp/lb)
Technify Motors	Centurion 4.0	2007-09-26	257 kW (345 hp)	2309	286 kg (631 lb)	0.9 kW/kg (0.55 hp/lb)
RED Aircraft	RED A03	2014-12-19	368 kW (500 hp)	2127	363 kg (800 lb)	1.01 kW/kg (0.61 hp/lb)

=== Technify Motors ===
Continental Motors, Inc. subsidiary Technify Motors GmbH of Sankt Egidien, Germany, is the new TC holder of the Thielert TAE 110 certified by the EASA on 8 March 2001, a 4-cylinder, four stroke 1,689 cm^{3} (103.1 in^{3}) engine with common rail direct injection, turbocharger, 1:1.4138 reduction gearbox and FADEC producing 81 kW (109 hp) at takeoff at 3675 rpm and 66 kW (89 hp) continuously at 3400 rpm for 141 kg (311 lb). The TAE 125-01, certified 3 May 2002, is the same with a 1:1.689 gearbox, weighs 134 kg (295 lb) and outputs 99 kW (133 hp) maximum at 3900 rpm, like the later 1,991 cm^{3} (121.5 in^{3}) TAE 125-02-99 certified on 14 August 2006, then the TAE 125-02-114 on 6 March 2007 for 114 kW (153 hp) at 3900 rpm, and the TAE 125-02-125 outputting 125 kW (168 hp) at 3400 rpm for 156 kg (344 lb).

The Centurion 4.0 is a four stroke 3,996 cm^{3} (243.9 in^{3}) 8-cylinder, with common rail, 2 turbochargers, 1:1.689 reduction gearbox, propeller governor and FADEC weighting 286 kg (631 lb) and certified on 26 September 2007 for up to 257 kW (345 hp) maximum, 243 kW (326 hp) continuous at 3900 rpm. The centurion 4.0 V8 has not been certified for installation in any airframes.

EASA certified on 20 June 2017, the Centurion 3.0 is a 2,987 cm^{3} (182.3 in^{3}) four stroke V6, also with common rail, turbocharger, Electronic Engine Control Unit (EECU) and 1 : 1.66 reduction gearbox, weighting 265 kg (584 lb) and outputting 221 kW (300 HP) at take-off, 202 kW (272 HP) continuously, both at 2340 propeller RPM.

==== Thielert ====
Thielert, based in German Lichtenstein, Saxony was the original TC holder of the 1.7 based on the Mercedes A-class turbo diesel, running on diesel and jet A-1 fuel. It was certified for retrofitting to Cessna 172s and Piper Cherokees, replacing the 160 hp (120 kW) Lycoming O-320 5.2 L (320 in^{3}) Avgas engine. The 134 kg (295 lb) of the 99 kW (133 hp) 1.7 engine is similar to the O-320 but its displacement is less than a third and it achieves maximum power at 2300 prop RPM instead of 2700.

Austrian aircraft manufacturer Diamond Aircraft Industries offered its single-engine Diamond DA40-TDI Star with the 1.7 engine, and the Diamond DA42 Twin Star with two, offering a low fuel consumption of 15.1 L/h (4.0 US gal/h). Robin Aircraft also offered a DR400 Ecoflyer with the Thielert engine.

In May 2008, Thielert went bankrupt and although Thielert's insolvency administrator, Bruno M. Kubler, was able to announce in January 2009 that the company was "in the black and working to capacity," by then Cessna had dropped plans to install Thielert engines in some models, and Diamond Aircraft has now developed its own in-house diesel engine: the Austro Engine E4. Several hundred Thielert-powered airplanes are flying.

=== SMA Engines ===
SMA Engines, located in Bourges, France, have designed the SMA SR305-230: a direct drive four-stroke, air and oil-cooled, turbo-diesel of four horizontally opposed cylinders displacing 4,988 cm^{3} (304.4 in^{3}) with an electronically controlled mechanical pump fuel injection, it obtained EASA certification on 20 April 2001 for 169 kW (227 hp) at 2200 rpm, weighting 195 kg (430 lb). A 194 kW (260 hp) SR305-260 was certified in February 2019. The SR305-230 obtained US FAA certification in July 2002. It is now certified as retrofit on several Cessna 182 models in Europe and the US, and Maule is working toward certification of the M-9-230. SMA's engineering team came from Renault Sport (Formula 1) and designed it from the ground up.

SMA develops a 250–300 kW (330–400 hp) six cylinder version, the SR460. At AERO Friedrichshafen 2016, SMA debuted a high power density engine demonstrator: a 135 hp (100 kW), 38-cubic-inch (0.62 liter) single cylinder four-stroke for 215 hp (160 kW) per liter, scalable from 300 to 600 kW (400 to 800 hp) and up to 1.5 hp/lb. (2.5 kW/kg) power density with a specific fuel consumption of 0.35 lb/hp/hr (210 g/kwh).

=== Austro Engine ===
Austro Engine GmbH, based in Wiener Neustadt, Austria had the E4 engine certified by EASA on 28 January 2009. It is a 4-cylinder, 1991 cm³ four stroke engine with common rail direct injection, turbocharger, 1:1.69 reduction gearbox and an Electronic Engine Control Unit. It produces 123.5 kW (165.6 hp) at Take-off and continuously, at 2300 propeller RPM for 185 kg (408 lb). The same weight E4P was certified on 26 March 2015 for 132 kW (177 hp) at Take-off at the same speed, and 126 kW (169 hp) continuously at 2200 propeller RPM.

In 2011, Austro Engine was developing a 280 hp (210 kW) 6-cylinder in cooperation with Steyr Motors, based on their 3.2 litres (200 in^{3}) block, to be used in the Diamond DA50.

=== DieselJet ===
DieselJet s.r.l. of Castel Maggiore, Italy, had its TDA CR 1.9 8V EASA certified on 11 June 2010: a 1.9 L (120 in^{3}) liquid cooled, 4 cylinder, 4 stroke, 8 valve engine, with a turbocharger and Common Rail injection, a 1:0.644 reduction gearbox and dual FADEC, it produces 118 kW (160 hp) at take-off and 107 kW (146 hp) continuously at 2450 propeller RPM for 205 kg (452 lb). The TDA CR 2.0 16V, certified 8 March 2016, is a 2.0 L (120 in^{3}) 16 valve engine with a 1:0.607 reduction ratio and a similar configuration, producing 142 kW (193 hp) continuous and 160 kW (217.5 hp) at take-off at 2306 propeller RPM for 219 kg (483 lb). In 2016, DieselJet was developing a 240 kW (320 hp) TDA CR 3.0 24V.

=== Continental Motors ===
Continental Motors, Inc. of Mobile, Alabama, received on December 19, 2012, a type certification for its Continental CD-230 under the official TD-300-B designation: a turbocharged 4-stroke direct drive flat four air-cooled engine of 4,972 cm^{3} (303.4 in^{3}), with direct fuel injection and electronic control unit with a mechanical back-up, outputting continuously 230 hp (170 kW) at 2200 RPM for 431 lb (195.5 kg) dry. It is developed from the SMA SR305-230.

=== RED Aircraft ===
RED Aircraft GmbH of Adenau, Germany, obtained EASA type certification on 19 December 2014 for its 6,134 cm^{3} (374.3 in^{3}) RED A03 V12 four stroke, with common rail, turbocharger, 1:1.88 reduction gearbox and single lever FADEC/EECS, outputting 368 kW (500 hp) at take-off at 2127 propeller RPM and 338 kW (460 hp) at 1995 propeller RPM continuously for 363 kg (800 lb) dry. The RED A05 is a 3550cc V6 preliminary design, outputting 300 hp (220 kW) at takeoff at 2127 propeller RPM and 280 hp (210 kW) continuously at 1995 propeller RPM, with a 210 g/kWh (0.35 lb/(hp⋅h)) best brake specific fuel consumption.

=== DeltaHawk Engines ===
DeltaHawk Engines, Inc., an American company, is currently developing three V-4 designs of 160, 180 and 150 kW (200 hp), the latter two versions being turbocharged. Using a ported two-stroke design, they have also flown a prototype engine in a pusher configuration. Velocity aircraft are claiming delivery of non-certified engines since 2005 and hope to achieve certification early in 2011. DeltaHawk engines have a dry oil sump, so they can run in any orientation: upright, inverted or vertical shaft by changing the location of the oil scavenge port. They can also run counter-rotation for installation in twins to eliminate the critical engine issue. A water-cooled DeltaHawk engine has been successfully fitted to a Rotorway helicopter, weighing the same as an air-cooled petrol engine of similar power and being capable of maintaining that power to 17,000 feet. The 180 hp DeltaHawk DH180 received its FAA Type certification in May 2023, first deliveries are planned in 2024.

== Experimental engines ==
A number of other manufacturers are currently developing experimental diesel engines, many using aircraft-specific designs rather than adapted automotive engines. Many are using two-stroke designs, with some opposed-piston layouts directly inspired by the original Junkers design.

Diesel Air Limited, Wilksch and Zoche have all had considerable problems bringing their prototype designs into production, with delays running into several years. The Diesel Air Limited-powered airship is no longer registered by the Civil Aviation Authority in the UK.

=== Two-stroke ===
Wilksch Airmotive, a British company, is developing a 89 kW (120 hp) three-cylinder two-stroke diesel (WAM-120) and is working on a four-cylinder 120 kW (160 hp) design (WAM-160). In 2007 Wilksch claimed that they had completed multiple tests on the WAM-100 LSA in accordance with ASTM F 2538 – the WAM-100 LSA is a derated WAM-120. Wilksch originally showed a two-cylinder prototype alongside the three- and four-cylinder models. In April 2008 IndUS Aviation introduced the first diesel light-sport aircraft with a WAM 120 having flown 400 hours on a Thorp T211 in England for the past four years. By mid-2009, approximately 40 WAM-120 units had been sold, with around half currently flying. The British owner of a VANS RV-9A fitted with a WAM-120 reports getting 125 kn (232 km/h) TAS at 6,000 ft (1,800 m) on 15 litre/hr of Jet A-1 fuel. A Rutan LongEz canard-pusher (G-LEZE) has also flown with the WAM-120 engine with test flights showing a TAS of 300 km/h (160 kn) at 3,400 m (11,000 ft) and 22 litre/hr. At economy cruise of 232 km/h (125 kn) at 610 m (2,000 ft) the fuel consumption is 12 L/h (3.2 gal/h), giving a range of 3,500 km (1,890 nmi).

GAP Diesel Engine is a NASA development.

With the branding Zoche aero-diesel, the company "Michael Zoche Antriebstechnik" in Munich/Germany has produced a prototype range of three radial air-cooled two-stroke diesel aero-engines, comprising a V-twin, a single-row cross-4 and a double-row cross-8. A Zoche engine has run successfully in wind tunnel tests. Zoche seem barely closer to production than they were a decade ago.

Andy Higgs' Advanced Component Engineering designed a step piston 750 kW (1,000 hp) V12 weighing 665 lb /302 kg with the reduction gearbox to replace low-end, 430 to 890 kW (580 to 1,200 hp) PT6s like in the Cessna Caravan; a 260 kW (350 hp), 302 pounds/137 kg four-cylinder with a gearbox to reduce the prop RPM to 2300 from 5300; and a 1.5 L (92 in^{3}) V4 weighing 103 pounds/47 kg and producing 120 hp (89 kW). see http://www.higgs-diesel.com/higgs-diesel/falconfl200/ and http://www.higgs-diesel.com/higgs-diesel/hawkv4/ for the actual-engine pages ( sorry I don't know how to do the references properly, please fix if you know how ), & this is produced by Higgs-Diesel, so the "Advanced Component Engineering" in the title of this paragraph isn't identifying the actual company.

The 1,000 in^{3} (16 L) v12 can power generators, tanks, boats or blimps and v4 and v8 versions can be derived.

The Bourke engine, designed by Russell Bourke, of Petaluma, CA, is an opposed rigidly connected twin cylinder design using the detonation principle.

==== Opposed-piston engines ====
Diesel Air Limited is a British company developing a 75 kW (100 hp) twin-cylinder (therefore four-piston), two-stroke opposed-piston engine inspired by the original Junkers design. Their engine has flown in test aircraft and airship installations. Unlike the Junkers, it is made for horizontal installation with a central output shaft for the geared cranks, the overall installed shape thereby approximately resembling a four-stroke flat-four engine.

Powerplant Developments, a British company, is developing a 75 and 89 kW (100 and 120 hp) opposed-piston engine called the Gemini 100/120 that resembles the Diesel Air Limited engine and uses the Junkers twin-crank principle, again for horizontal installation with a central output shaft for the geared cranks. However, the Gemini 100 is an engine. Like Diesel Air Limited, Powerplant Developments claim to be using Weslake Air Services for production. They have recently announced that Tecnam will test a prototype with the Gemini engine.

Superior Air Parts' subsidiary Gemini Diesel develops three cylinder two-stroke designs with six opposed pistons:

- a 100 hp (75 kW) weighing 159.5 lb (72.5 kg),
- a turbocharged 125 hp (118 kW) weighing 175 lb (72.5 kg), both measuring 23” wide × 16” high × 23” long (58 × 40 cm × 58 cm) and reaching .38 and .378 lb/hp/h (231 and 230 g/kW/h) BSFC, respectively;
- larger three cylinder (six piston) engines would produce 180-200 hp (134-149 kW) weighing 276 lb (125 kg) in 29” W × 16” H × 29” L (73 × 41.5 × 72.5 cm) and 300-360 HP (224-268 KW) turbocharged whilst weighing 386 lb (175 kg) within 29” W × 19” H × 37” L (73 × 47.5 × 95 cm)
- five cylinder (10 piston) engines would produce 450 hp (336 kW) whilst weighing 474 lb (215 kg) within 29” W × 22” H × 43 ” L (73 × 55 × 110 cm)
- six cylinder(12 piston) engines would attain 550 hp (410 kW) whilst weighing 551 pounds (250 kg in 29” W × 22” H × 48” L (73 × 55 × 122 cm), burning .386 to .360 lb/hp/h (235 to 219 g/kW/h) The 100 hp version will cost less than $25,000.

Weslake Engine, another UK based company, displayed its A80 lightweight diesel engine at Friedrichshafen Aero 2015.

=== Four-stroke ===
Wisconsin-based Engineered Propulsion Systems develops its Graflight liquid-cooled V-8 engine with steel pistons and compacted graphite iron crankcase for better strength and durability than aluminium at similar weight, increasing time between overhauls to 3,000 hours. It is managed by a Bosch ECU and consumes Jet A, JP-8 or straight diesel for general aviation aircraft and small helicopters, military drones, small boats or troop carriers, and its low vibration allows the use of composite or aluminium airscrews. At 195 kW (262 hp), 75% of the 261 kW (350 hp) maximum power, it consumes 35 kg/h (77 lb/h), in comparison to the Continental TSIO-550-E, which burns 50 kg/h (110 lb/h)

==== Automotive derived ====
Raptor Turbo Diesel LLC, an American company, is currently developing the Raptor 105 diesel engine. It is a four-stroke inline turbo charged engine. Formerly Vulcan Aircraft Engines (until September 2007).

ECO Motors developed the EM 80 and EM 75 kW (100 hp) 4 stroke 4 cylinder diesel with FADEC based on a car engine for 98 kg (216 lb) dry but disappeared since 2008.

The FlyEco diesel is a three-cylinder, 0.8 L (49 in^{3}) engine producing 80 HP / 58,8 kW up to 3,800 RPM and reduced by 1:1.50-1.79, derived from the Smart Car. It powers the Siemens-FlyEco Magnus eFusion hybrid electric aircraft.

==== Teos/Austro Engine AE440 ====
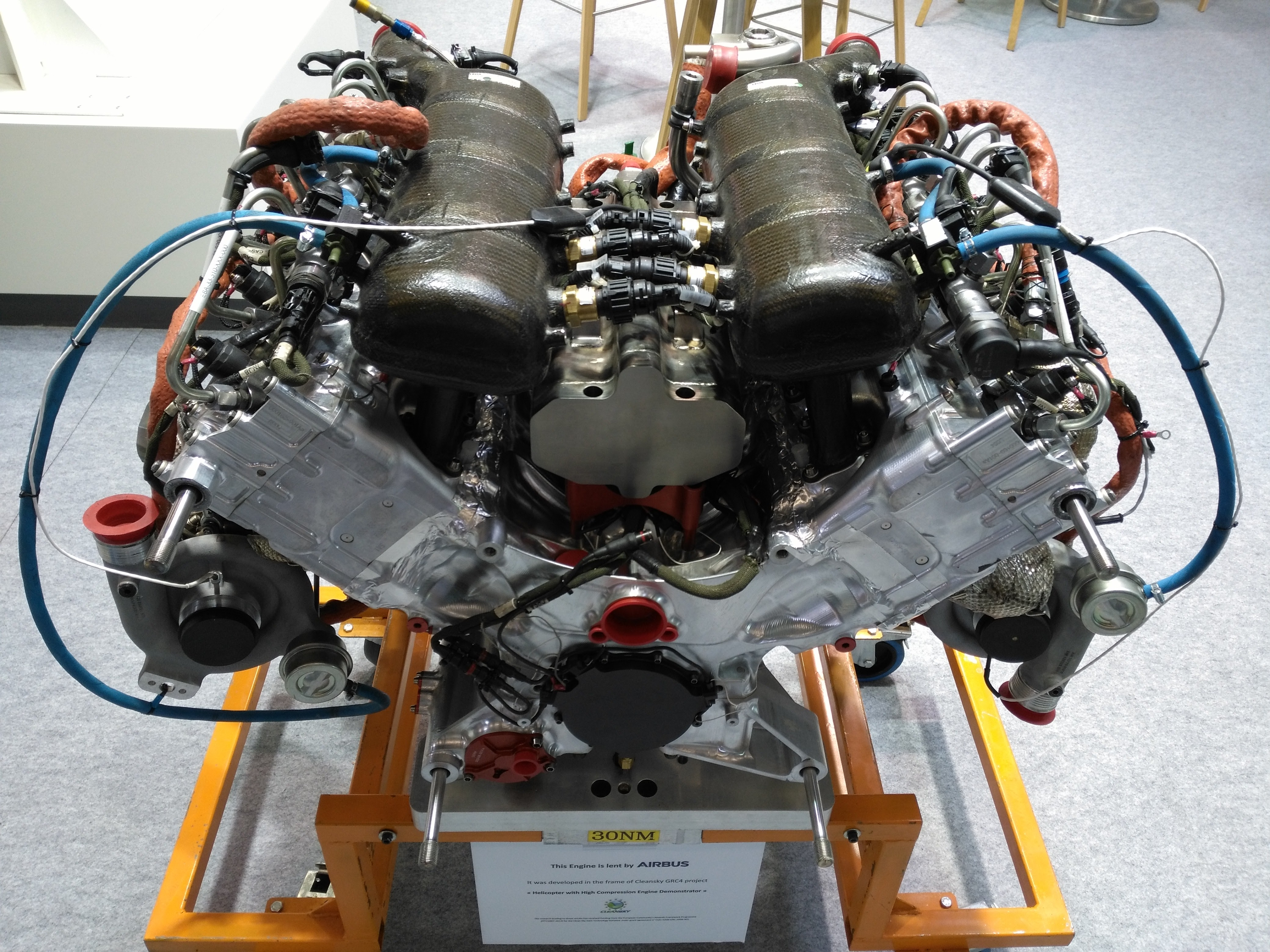
The AE440 presented by Mecachrome in 2017

Within the Green Rotorcraft European Clean Sky Joint Technology Initiative environmental research program started in 2011, an Airbus Helicopters H120 Colibri technology demonstrator equipped with a HIPE AE440 high-compression diesel engine, running on jet fuel, first flew on 6 November 2015. The powerplant is a liquid-cooled, dry sump lubricated 4.6 L (280 in^{3}) 90° V8 engine with 1,800 bar (26,000 psi) common rail direct injection, fully machined aluminium blocks, titanium connecting rods, steel pistons and liners, one turbocharger per cylinder bank.

With an air/air intercooler, it weighs 197 kg (434 lb) (dry) without gearbox and the 330 kW (440 hp) installed powerpack weighs 249 kg (549 lb). Its brake specific fuel consumption is 200 g/kW.h. It is manufactured by Teos Powertrain Engineering, a joint venture between Mecachrome and D2T (IFPEN group) for the mechanical design, engine main parts manufacturing, assembly and testing and Austro Engine for the dual channel FADEC and harness, fuel system, airworthiness.

== See also ==
- List of aircraft engines
