= Thielert Centurion =

Series of Diesel cycle aircraft engines for general aviation

Centurion
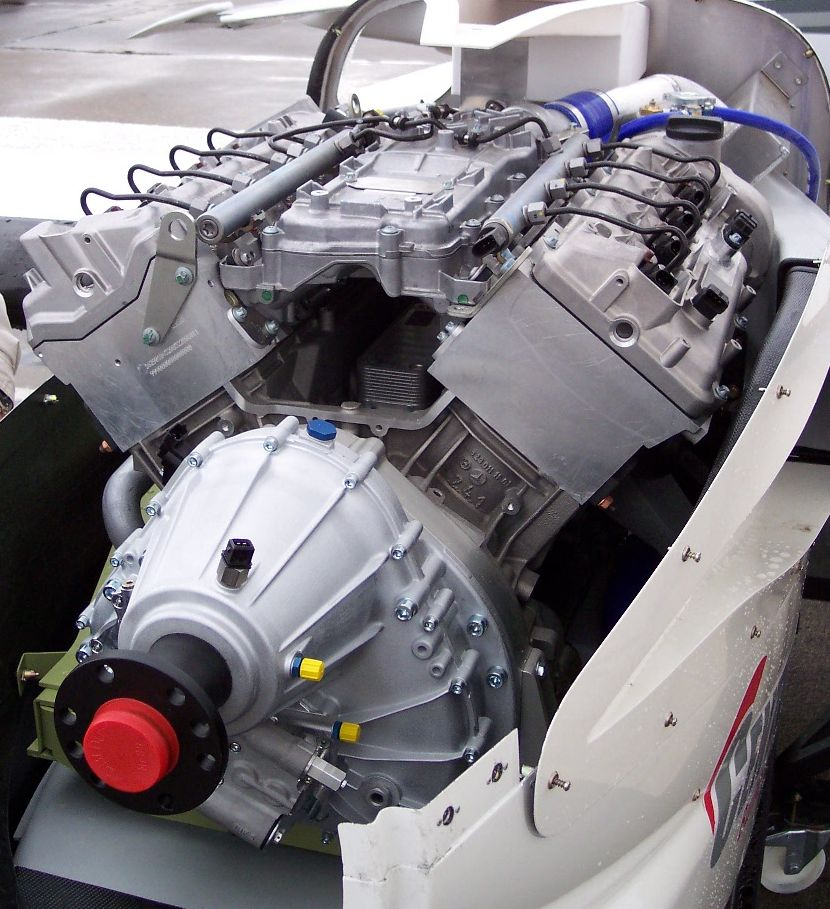
- Thielert Centurion 4.0
- Type: Aircraft Diesel engine
- Manufacturer: Thielert
- Major applications: Diamond DA42 Twin Star

The Thielert Centurion is a series of diesel cycle aircraft engines for general aviation originally built by Thielert, which was bought by Aviation Industry Corporation of China's Technify Motors subsidiary and is currently marketed by Continental Motors. They are based on heavily modified Mercedes-Benz automotive engines.

== Design ==
All Centurion engines are liquid-cooled, turbocharged, and employ a single-lever power control (SLPC) associated with a full authority digital engine control (FADEC). This simplifies engine management for the pilot, as well as improving reliability as it prevents the engine being operated improperly. The series utilizes either jet fuel or diesel fuel. The high compression ratio of the engine combined with the digitally controlled fuel injection system mirrors similar advances in automotive technology.

Centurion series engines are always fitted with constant speed propellers which allow the engine to be operated at optimum speed at all times. However, the normal RPM speed is too high for any suitable propeller, consequently the propeller is driven through a reduction gearbox. The constant speed propeller and reduction gear result in a propeller tip speed that is 10-15% lower than comparable conventional avgas engines, reducing propeller noise.

The diesel engine's high compression results in better fuel efficiency and the higher operating rpm of the Centurion allows higher power to be developed from a smaller displacement, in comparison with conventional aircraft piston engines (i.e. engines that require leaded aviation gasoline with a very high octane rating).

A Centurion engine complete with constant speed unit (CSU), reduction gearbox, turbocharger and FADEC engine management system is considerably heavier than the more conventional Continental and Lycoming engines which it competes against. However, this weight disadvantage is compensated for by the Centurion's lower fuel consumption. Even though they lack the magnetos and spark plugs of conventional petrol (gas) piston engines, Centurion engines are considerably more complex.

== Variants ==
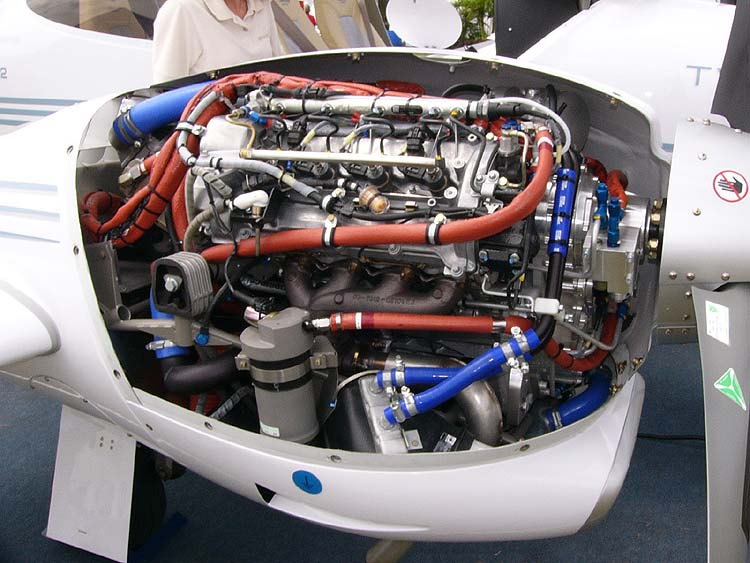
Centurion 1.7 installation in a Diamond DA42

Centurion 1.7 (TAE 125-01)
The first product introduced by Thielert, a 1689 cm^{3} (103 in^{3}) engine producing 135 PS (99 kW) is an inline-four engine based on the Mercedes-Benz OM668 from Mercedes-Benz A-Class A 170 CDI (W168) with 80 mm bore and 84 mm stroke.

The engine produces more power than a Lycoming O-320 above 4,000 ft, can maintain 93 kW (125 hp) till FL120, and burns 17.5 L/h (4.6 US gal/h) in cruise at FL175 for 72 kW (97 hp): 0.194 kg/kWh (0.319 lb/(hp⋅h)).

More than 1,500 Centurion 1.7s had been built until the end of 2006 when it was replaced by the Centurion 2.0. The in-service record of the 1.7 has been poor.

A combination of design, service and support issues caused widespread customer dissatisfaction.
Diamond then designed its own Austro Engines as an alternative to Thielert.

The engines were later marketed as the CD-135 by Continental Engines and produced in St. Egidien, Germany before being granted final assembly in Fairhope, Alabama for the U.S. retrofit market in 2015.

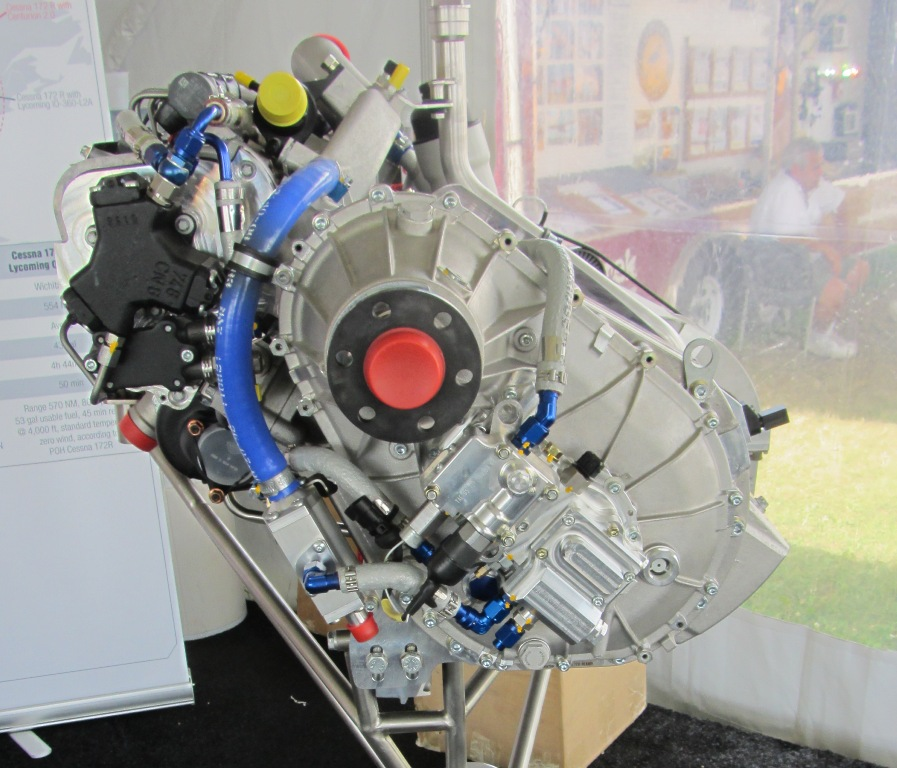
Centurion 2.0

Centurion 2.0 - Continental CD-135 (TAE 125-02-99)
Introduced in late 2006. The main difference is a new Mercedes-Benz OM640 engine cylinder block from the Mercedes-Benz A 200 CDI (W169) with a displacement of 1991 cm^{3} (Ø83 x 92 mm). Other improvements include a more compact FADEC, a lighter cast gearbox housing, interfaces for glass cockpits and a new service tool that allows the FADEC to be programmed in the field. Dimensions of the Centurion 2.0 and 1.7 are nearly identical and the install kits are compatible, so a 1.7 at the end of its life can be replaced with a 2.0. The Centurion 2.0 is rated for a power output of 135 PS (99 kW), the same as the 1.7, but is EASA and FAA certified for 155 PS (114 kW). It has accumulated more than 1,000,000 flight hours without mechanical failures as of April 2008.

Centurion 2.0 S (TAE 125-02-114)
This 4-cylinder turbodiesel common rail direct injection with redundant FADEC control offers 155 PS (114 kW) providing a significant power increase compared to the 135 PS (99 kW) Centurion 2.0 for no additional weight. An engine kit may cost $89,000.

Centurion 3.0
Certified 20 June 2017 by Technify Motors GmbH (application: 19 December 2013), 2987 cm^{3} V6 four stroke Diesel piston engine with common rail high pressure direct fuel injection, turbocharger, 1:1.66 gearbox and electronic engine control unit. 980 mm Length × 700 mm Height × 790 mm Width, 265 kg dry, 221 kW (300 HP) for 5 min, 202 kW (272 HP) maximum continuous, both at 3880 rpm (2340 prop rpm). It has the same dimensions as the Mercedes-Benz OM642.

Centurion 3.2
Intended to fill the gap between the Centurion 2.0 and the 4.0 and designed to produce 230 hp (172 kW). Development is largely complete, but the project is on hold.

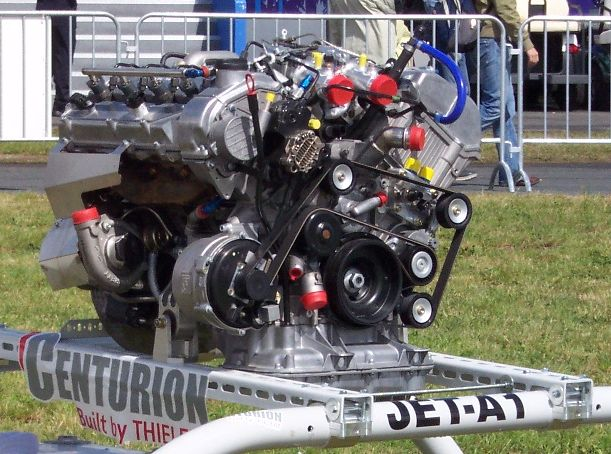
A Centurion 4.0 on display

Centurion 4.0
The 75° V8 DOHC 4 valves per cylinder was initially equipped with two turbochargers and weighed 283.5 kg (625 lb) dry for 228 kW max (310 hp) till FL80 at 2300 rpm at the propeller, and 176 kW (250 hp) in cruise for 29.5 L (7.8 US gal)/h and 25 L (6.6 US gal)/h at best economy, for 208 g/kW/h (0.342 lb/hp/h). It was planned for a production of 600 per year.

Designed as a larger engine to replace the 300 hp (224 kW) gasoline engines and developed from the Mercedes-Benz OM629 automobile engine, it produced 350 hp (261 kW) later with a larger single turbocharger.

After the insolvency of Thielert in April 2008 all work on the Centurion 4.0 was frozen.

Continental CD-155
Is the Continental Motors, Inc. brand name of the Centurion 2.0S with 155 PS (114 kW). The engine must be replaced every 2,100 hours, the gearbox has to be replaced for an inspection at 900 hours, the high-pressure pump has a life limit of 600 hours, the alternator of 600 hours, friction disk of 900 hours, V-ribbed belt of 1,200 hours, alternator excitation battery of 12 months. Fuel, oil, and cooling lines are replaced at 60 months except for the Robin DR400 where these items are 'on condition' with no set life-limit. The dual mass flywheel, which is intended to have the same life as the engine, is tested in-situ at 1,200 hours.

TAE 125-02-125 (Continental CD-170)
A four-cylinder, liquid-cooled 125 kW (168 hp) diesel engine with FADEC, dual overhead camshafts and a common rail direct fuel injection system, weighing 156 kg (344 lb) and certified by the EASA on 22 July 2020. In September 2020 the Tecnam P2010 TDI was launched with the CD170 as its powerplant.

Continental CD-300
The Continental brand name of the six cylinder 3 litre Thielert Diesel, with an output of 300 hp (224 kW) at 2300 rpm. The CD-300 should replace the Safran/SMA diesel engine for the five-seat, single-engine Diamond DA50 from the third quarter of 2020 after a first flight of the combination on 22 March 2019, with a cruise fuel burn of 34.8 L/h (9.2USgal/h). FAA certification was granted on 25 July 2023.

== Applications ==
=== Centurion 1.7 ===
- Diamond DA40-TDI Star
- Diamond DA42 Twin Star
- Apex Aircraft Robin DR400 135 CDI Ecoflyer
- Cessna 172 (under a supplemental type certificate available for 172F and later models)
- General Atomics MQ-1C Gray Eagle

=== CD135, CD155 & CD170 (Centurion 2.0) ===
- Diamond DA42 Twin Star
- Diamond DA40
- Tecnam P2010 (CD170)
- Cessna 172 (under a supplemental type certificate available for 172F and later models)
- Robin DR400 Ecoflyer
- TAI Anka Turkish Aerospace Industries MALE UAV
- Piper PA-28 Cherokee (under a supplemental type certificate)
- Piper PA-28 Archer DX
- Airbus Helicopters VSR700 naval UAV based on the Cabri G2

=== Centurion 3.2 ===
- Cessna 182 (proposed supplemental type certificate)

=== Centurion 4.0 ===
- Cirrus SR-22 (STC)
- Cessna 206 (STC)
- Hybrid Air Vehicles HAV 304 Airlander 10

=== Continental CD-155 ===
- Cessna Turbo Skyhawk JT-A – new production aircraft with engine installation under an STC
- Glasair Sportsman 2+2 – experimental homebuilt aircraft
- Akaflieg Stuttgart FS35 – motorglider optimized for aero tow

=== Continental CD300 ===
- Diamond DA50 RG

== See also ==
Comparable engines

- Austro Engine E4
- Continental CD-200
- SMA SR305-230

Related lists

- List of aircraft engines
