= Diamond DA50 =

Austrian light aircraft

DA50
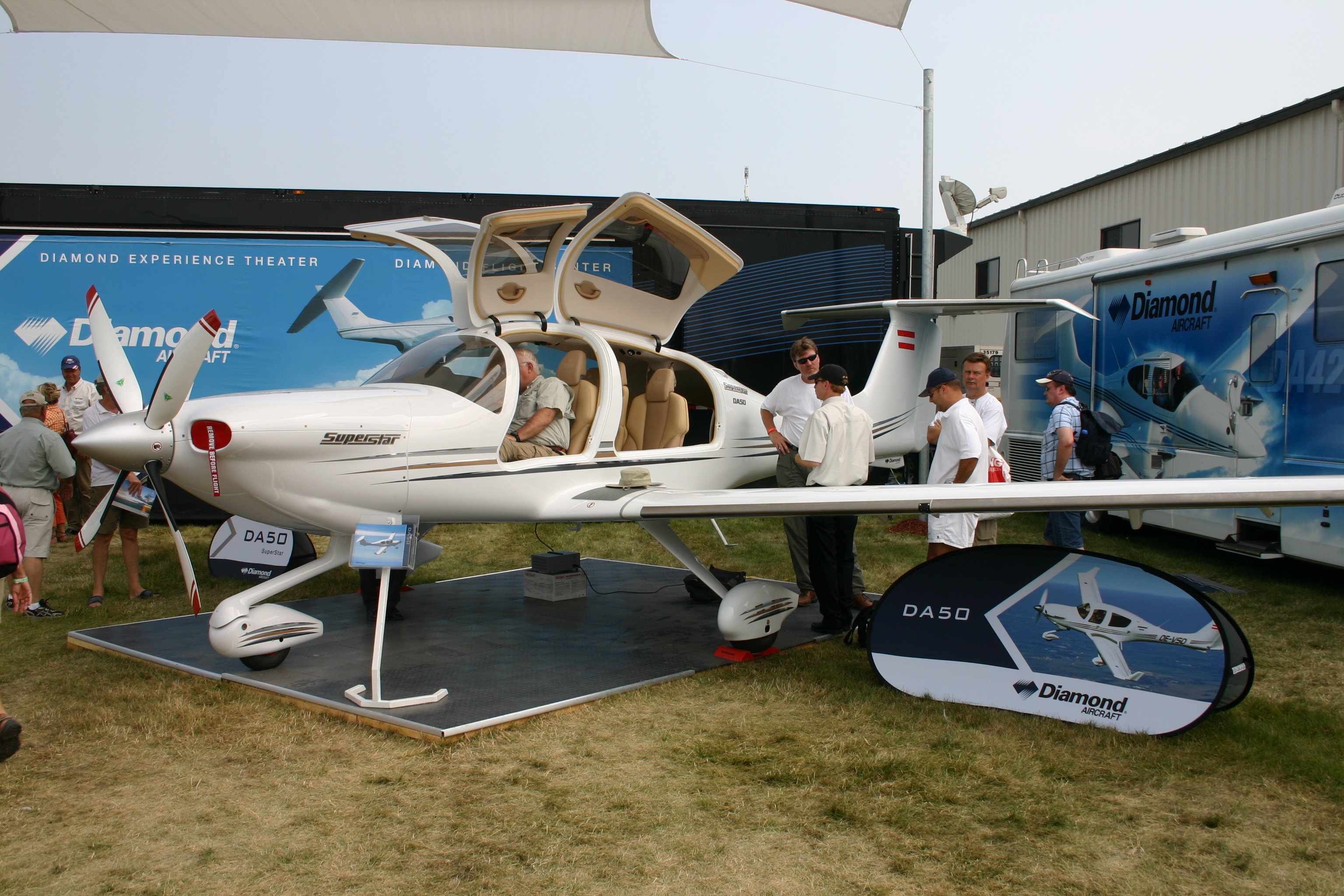
- DA50 at Airventure 2007

General information
- National origin: Austria
- Manufacturer: Diamond Aircraft Industries

History
- First flight: 4 April 2007

The Diamond DA50 is a five seat, single-engine, composite aircraft designed and built by Diamond Aircraft Industries. First shown in 2006, it made its maiden flight on 4 April 2007. The project has been proposed to be powered by several different engines, but was certified on 9 September 2020 with the Continental CD-300 diesel.

== Development ==
The DA50 Super Star prototype was unofficially first shown in December 2006 at a Diamond company Christmas party. The aircraft was designed with the intention of fitting it with gasoline, turboprop or diesel engines up to 260 kW (350 hp). The initial design goal was that it would have one of the largest cabins of the new generation of general aviation airplanes.

The avgas-powered version of the DA50 was intended to be equipped with a single FADEC-equipped Continental TSIO-550-J powerplant with twin turbo chargers producing 260 kW (350 hp). The plane's wingspan was reported as 11.67 m (38.3 ft), with overall fuselage length of 8.84 m (29 ft). The maximum takeoff weight was planned to be 3,527 lb (1,600 kg). The Diamond DA50 Super Star was intended to be pressurized and to offer a Ballistic Recovery Systems aircraft parachute system as an option.

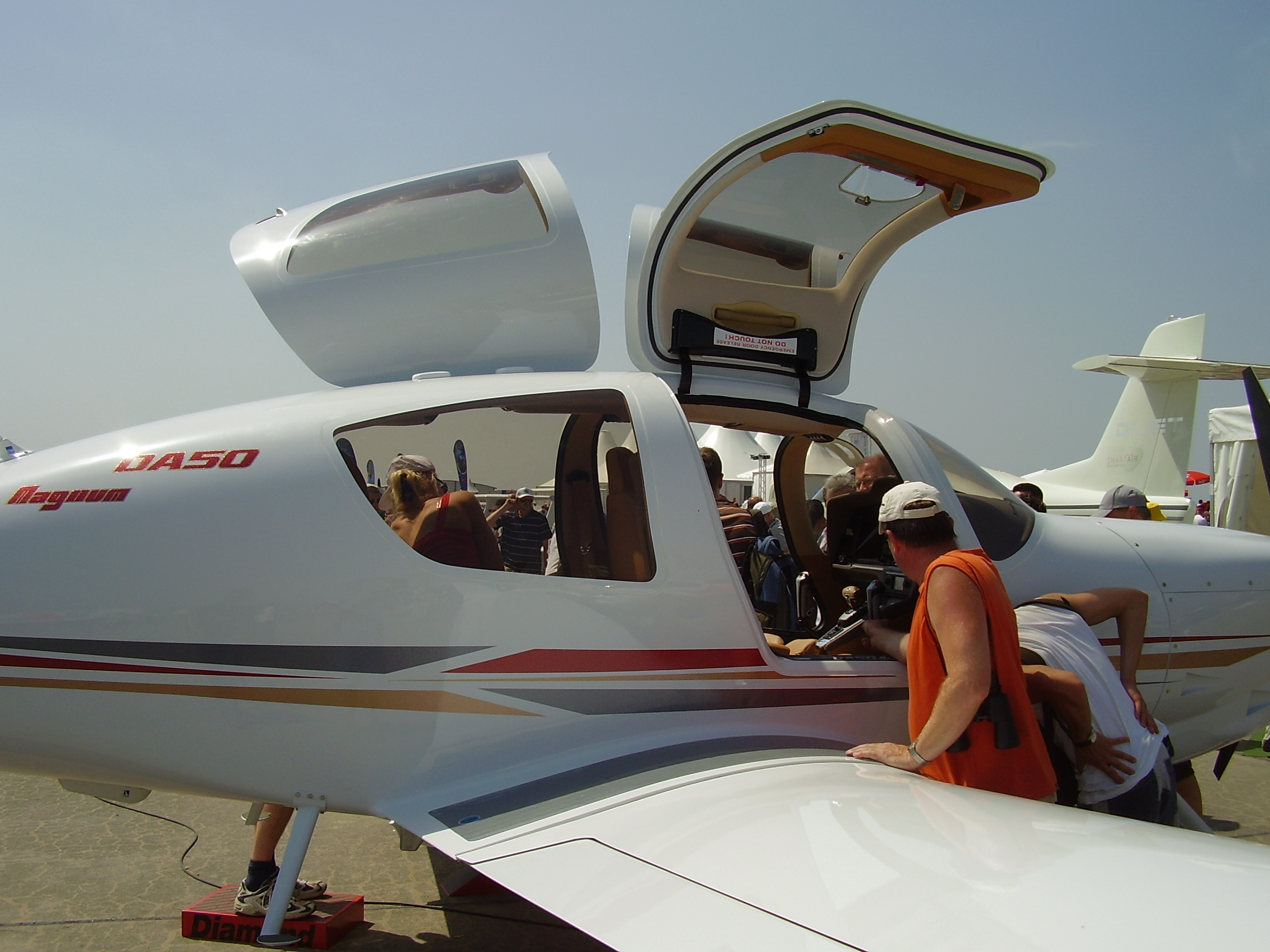
Diamond DA50 Magnum prototype on display at ILA Berlin Air Show 2008

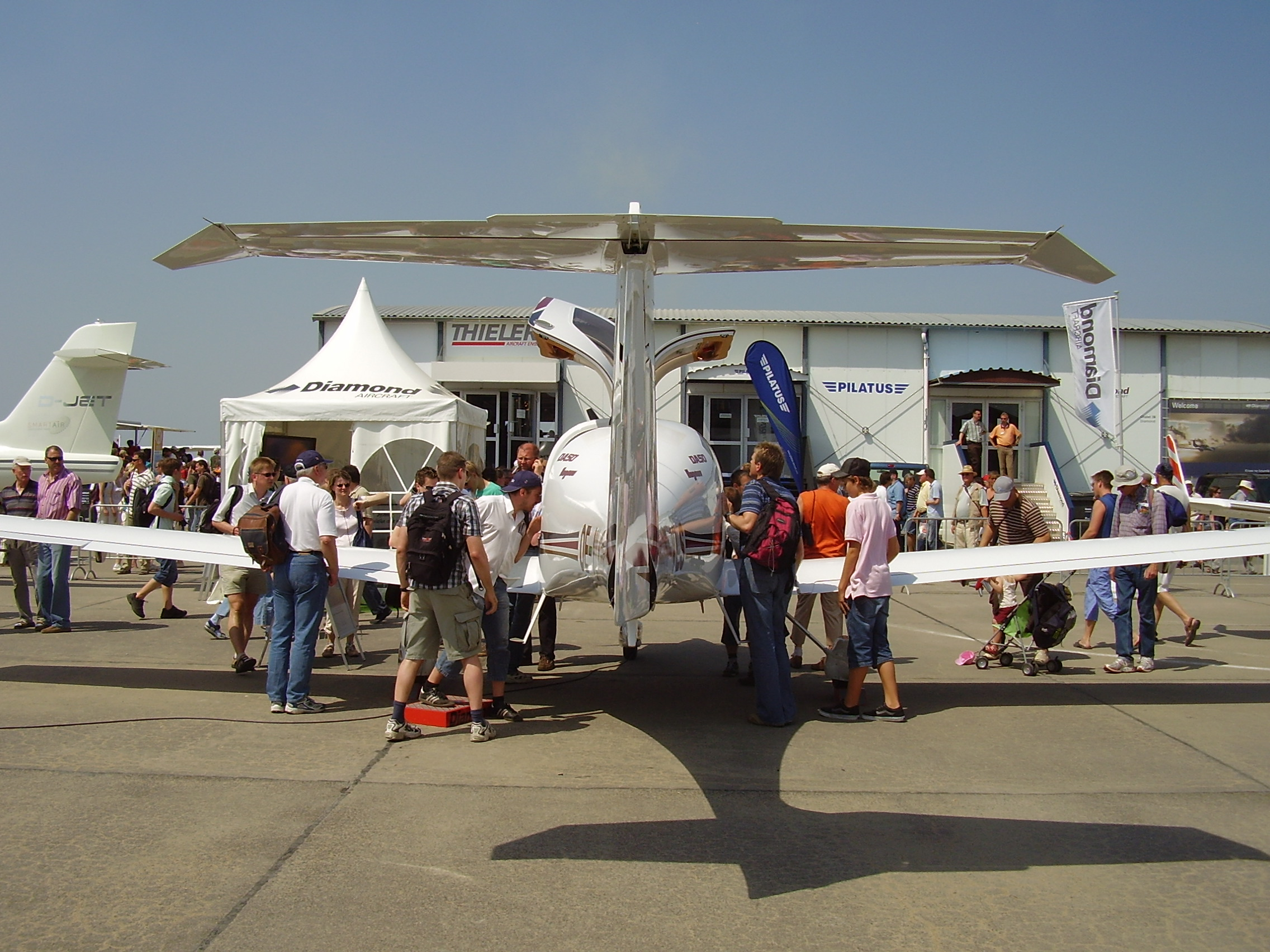
Diamond DA50 Magnum prototype on display at ILA Berlin Air Show 2008

The DA50 made its first test flight on 4 April 2007 at the Wiener Neustadt East Airport, Austria. The airplane made its public debut at the AERO Friedrichshafen show in Germany on 19 April 2007 and was first shown in North America at Airventure in July 2007.

The DA50 project was put on hold in 2009 as the economy entered the Great Recession and Diamond turned all their attention to the Diamond D-Jet.

On 19 January 2015 the prototype, now designated DA50-JP7 and powered by an Ivchenko-Progress Motor Sich AI-450S turboprop powerplant, was test-flown in Wiener Neustadt. In 2015 type certification was expected near the end of 2016.

At the April 2017 AERO Friedrichshafen show, Diamond announced the DA50 variants powered by diesel SMA Engines and other powerplants. These included the four-seat 170 kW (230 hp) DA50-IV, the five-seat 190 kW (260 hp) DA50-V and seven-seat 270 kW (360 hp) DA50-VII - also proposed to be powered by a 280 kW (375 hp) gasoline Lycoming engine or an Ivchenko-Progress Motor Sich AI-450S turboprop. The DA50-V model was displayed at that show. It had made its first flight in March 2017 and at that time certification was planned for 2018.

By April 2019 no DA50 models had been produced beyond one single prototype. The company then announced a new version of the design with fully retractable landing gear and a Continental CD-300 diesel engine, at the 2019 AERO Friedrichshafen show. That retractable gear-equipped second prototype was first flown on 28 October 2019. At that time Diamond planned to announce its price and start accepting orders at the Aero Friedrichshafen show in April 2020, with European certification and introduction expected in the third quarter of 2020.

Diamond Aircraft announced EASA certification of the DA50 RG (retractable gear) on 9 September 2020, with deliveries planned to start in the first quarter of 2021. FAA certification and the aircraft's first U.S. sale occurred in July 2023.

== Design ==
The five-seat DA50 RG airframe is constructed predominantly of composite material. It is powered by a single 220 kW (300 hp) Continental CD-300 diesel engine, with a fuel capacity of 190 L (50 U.S. gal).

The design features double-slotted flaps, retractable landing gear, a Garmin G1000 NXi flightdeck with autopilot and single lever power controls. Optional equipment includes a removable right-hand control stick, an on-board oxygen system, electric-powered air conditioning, a TKS de-icing system and a Garmin GCU 476 input keypad.

The aircraft cruises at 180 kn (333 km/h) and has a 750 nmi (1,389 km) range, with a fuel economy of 34 L (9 US gal) per hour. It has a useful load of 560 kg (1,232 lb).

== Operational history ==
In its first long flight, a factory demonstrator DA50 RG was flown from the factory in Austria to the China AirShow 2021 in Zhuhai, Guangdong. The flight involved 12 stops en route and took 45 flight hours over eight days, flying 13,025 km (7,033 nmi).

== Variants ==
DA50 SuperStar
Pressurized version powered by a Teledyne Continental TSIOF-550J. US FAA certification was initially forecast for 2012.
DA50 Magnum
Unpressurized version, with a standard integral oxygen system, powered by an Austro Engine AE 300 130 kW (170 hp) diesel, US FAA certification originally forecast for mid-2010.
DA50-JP7
Seven-seat version powered by a 350 kW (465 hp) FADEC-controlled Ivchenko-Progress Motor Sich AI-450S turboprop engine. Two sub-variants were planned, one "tundra" version with rugged landing gear, and one high-performance version for training and private customers. Certification was initially planned for the mid to end of 2016.
DA50-IV
Four-seat version powered by a 170 kW (230 hp) SMA SR305-230 diesel engine announced at the AERO Friedrichshafen show in April 2017.
DA50-V
Five-seat version powered by an SMA Engines 190 kW (260 hp) diesel engine. It was first flown in March 2017 and introduced at the AERO Friedrichshafen show in April 2017. Certification was initially planned for 2018.
DA50-VII
Seven-seat version powered by an SMA Engines SMA SR460 270 kW (360 hp) diesel engine, a 280 kW (375 hp) Lycoming Engines gasoline powerplant or a 340 kW (450 hp) Ivchenko-Progress Motor Sich AI-450S turboprop. The model was announced at the Aero Friedrichshafen show in April 2017.
DA50 RG
Five seat version powered by a Continental CD-300 220 kW (300 hp) diesel engine. The model received an EASA type certificate on 9 September 2020 and FAA certification on 25 July 2023.

== Specifications (DA50 RG) ==
Data from Diamond Aircraft

General characteristics

- Crew: one
- Capacity: four passengers
- Length: 9.23 m (30 ft 3 in)
- Wingspan: 13.41 m (44 ft 0 in)
- Height: 2.88 m (9 ft 5 in)
- Empty weight: 1,440 kg (3,175 lb)
- Max takeoff weight: 2,000 kg (4,409 lb)
- Fuel capacity: 190 L (50 US gal)
- Useful load: 559 kg (1,232 lb)
- Powerplant: 1 × Continental CD-300 turbocharged, FADEC controlled jet fuel engine, 224 kW (300 hp)
- Propellers: 3-bladed MT-Propeller MTV-12-D/210-56

Performance

- Maximum speed: 335 km/h (208 mph, 181 kn) (ISA, 16,000 ft, 1,700 kg, MCP)
- Stall speed: 106 km/h (66 mph, 57 kn) landing configuration
- Range: 1,389 km (863 mi, 750 nmi) incl. 30 min. reserve
- Service ceiling: 6,096 m (20,000 ft)
- Rate of climb: 5.3 m/s (1,040 ft/min)
- Power/mass: 0.11 kW/kg (0.067 hp/lb)
- Fuel consumption at max range: 34.1 L/h (9 US gal/h)
- Take-off distance (ISA SL, MTOM, ground roll / 50 ft obstacle) : 440 m / 740 m (1,444 ft / 2,427 ft)
- Landing distance (ISA SL, MTOM, ground roll / 50 ft obstacle) : 340 m / 640 m (1,115 ft / 2,100 ft)

== See also ==
Related development

- Diamond DA40
- Diamond DA62

Aircraft of comparable role, configuration, and era

- Beechcraft Bonanza
- Cessna 206
- Cirrus SR22
- Piper Matrix
