= SMA Engines =

French aircraft engine manufacturer

- Industry: Aerospace
- Founded: 1997
- Headquarters: Bourges, France
- Products: Aircraft Diesel engines
- Parent: Safran
- Website: www.sma-engines.aero

SMA Engines (Société de Motorisations Aéronautiques) is a French manufacturer of diesel engines for light aircraft, located in Bourges. A subsidiary of Safran, SMA engine production is currently limited to one model, the SMA SR305-230, which has received a Supplemental Type Certificate for installation in the Cessna 182Q and R. The engine uses jet fuel, readily available at airports worldwide.

== History ==
SMA was founded in 1997 as a 50/50 joint venture between SOCATA and Renault Sport to develop a diesel engine for light aircraft. SNECMA also entered the joint venture with a one-third interest in June 2000. The prefix of the engines changed to SR, for SNECMA-Renault. In 2005, Safran bought out the other partners to become the sole owner of SMA.

On 25 September 2020 Safran announced the sale of the SR305 and SR460 engine programs to Röder Group.

== Products ==
- SMA SR305-230 4-cylinder
- SMA SR460 6-cylinder version, 250 to 300 kW (330 to 400 hp), in development.
