= SMA SR305-230 =

1990s French piston aircraft engine

SR305-230
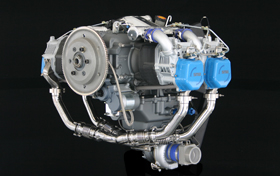
- Type: Four-cylinder four-stroke diesel aero engine
- National origin: France
- Manufacturer: SMA Engines
- First run: 1998 (First flight)
- Major applications: Cessna 182
- Number built: >50
- Developed into: Continental TD-300

The SMA SR305-230 is an air/oil-cooled, horizontally opposed, four-cylinder, four-stroke, diesel piston aircraft engine producing 170 kW (227 hp). The engine is manufactured by SMA Engines, and is currently the only product of this French company. The engine is offered as a conversion package for the Cessna 182.

== Design ==
The SMA SR 305-230-1 is a four-cylinder, horizontally opposed turbocharged direct fuel injection diesel engine. The engine installation includes an electronic central processing unit (CPU) that continually calculates the proper fuel/air mixture. If this unit fails completely during flight, the mechanical backup position is selected and the pilot can control the fuel/air mixture as required to complete the flight.

Full-throttle operation at sea level is 300 kPa (90 inHg) of manifold pressure which is available to 3,000 metres (10,000 ft). Unlike some aircraft engines, which recommend the maximum power setting be used only for five minutes during the initial takeoff stage, the SR 305 can be operated indefinitely at this setting, although normal cruise is at 240 kPa (70 inHg) and economy cruise at 200 kPa (60 inHg) of manifold pressure.

The STC conversion on the Cessna 182 includes a new cowl, both to accommodate the different engine dimensions and to provide the required cooling airflow. Belly-mounted cowl flaps are still used, but less cooling airflow is directed over the cylinder barrels and more cooling airflow is directed into side-mounted oil coolers. About one-third of the engine cooling is provided by airflow over the cylinders; the remainder is provided by engine oil. The engine's oil distribution system routes a large oil flow to hot zones in the cylinder heads and upper cylinder barrels, carrying the heat away to the oil coolers.

As of early 2008, SMA had provided over 50 conversion packages. (The installation is usually performed by other companies, not SMA.) Most of those conversions were performed in Europe, with less than a dozen having been performed in North America.

The cost of conversion may be justified in areas where aviation gasoline costs significantly more than jet fuel, and by the fact that the diesel fuel flow at cruise is about 38 L (10 US gal) per hour, compared to about 51 L (13.5 US gal) per hour with the original engine.

SMA expects 90 engines to be delivered in 2014, and is working on six-cylinder version called the SR460 which will have an output of 250 to 300 kW (330 to 400 hp).

== Applications ==
- SMA SR305-230: Cessna 182 (STC conversion)
- SMA SR305-260E: Diamond DA50
- SMA SR305-230 ATLS GS-301 Batoor

In July 2012, Cessna announced it would offer the Cessna 182 with this engine as a factory option, with deliveries expected by the second quarter of 2013. Cessna also stated at that time that the SMA engine would eventually replace the current avgas engine. This plan was abandoned and in 2023 the Cessna 182 was still being sold only with the Lycoming IO-540-AB1A5 gasoline engine.

== Specifications ==
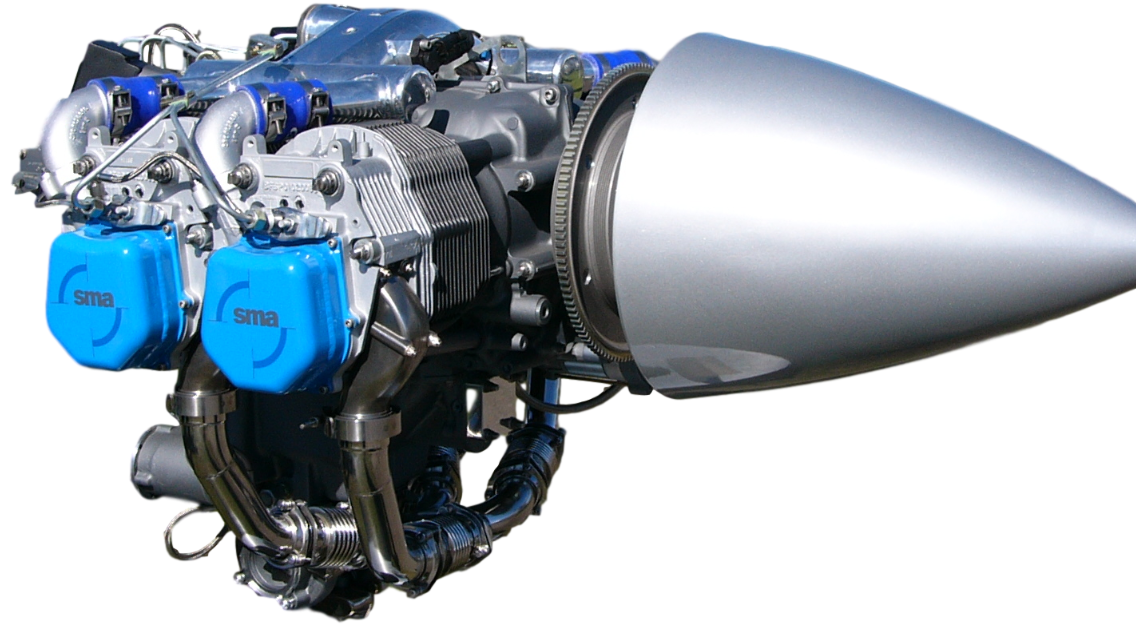
SMA SR305-230

Data from EASA TCDS

=== General characteristics ===
- Type: Four-cylinder, four-stroke diesel aircraft engine
- Displacement: 4,988 cm^{3} (304 cu in)
- Length: 834 mm (33 in)
- Width: 930 mm (37 in)
- Height: 750–784 mm (30–31 in)
- Dry weight: 195–207 kg (430–456 lb)

=== Components ===
- Fuel type: Jet fuel A/A-1
- Cooling system: Air/oil-cooled
- Reduction gear: Direct drive

=== Performance ===
- Power output: 169–194 kW (227–260 hp) at 2,200 rpm, producing 734–842 N⋅m (541–621 lb⋅ft) of torque, a 18.5-21.2 bar mean effective pressure

== See also ==
Related development

- Continental TD-300
- SMA SR460

Comparable engines

- Thielert Centurion
- Austro Engine E4

Related lists

- List of aircraft engines
