= Continental CD-230 =

Diesel aircraft engine produced by Continental Motors, Inc

CD-230
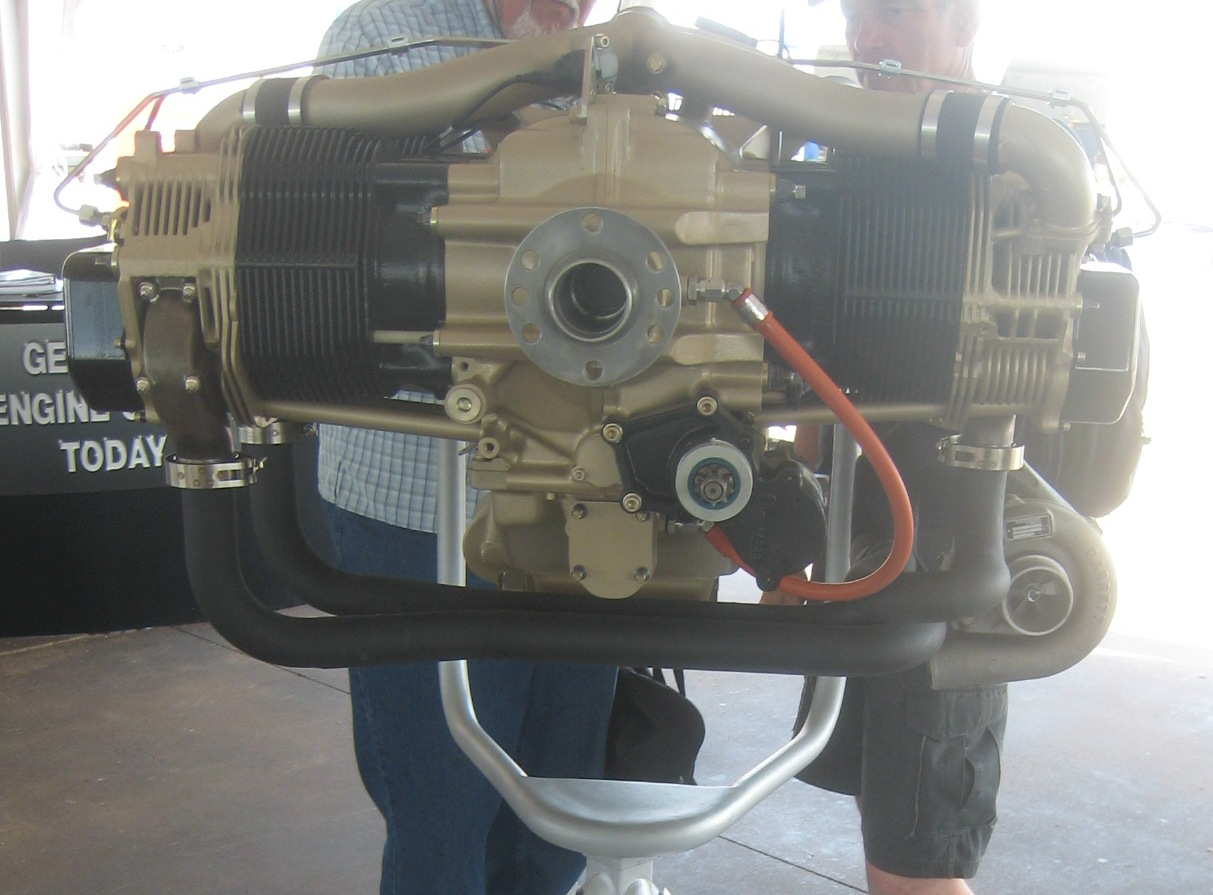
- TD-300 diesel engine
- Type: Aircraft Diesel engine
- Manufacturer: Continental Motors, Inc.
- First run: 2009
- Status: In production
- Manufactured: 2012-present
- Developed from: SMA SR305-230

The Continental CD-230 is a four-cylinder, horizontally opposed aircraft Diesel engine produced by Continental Motors, Inc. The engine received its type certificate from the US Federal Aviation Administration on December 19, 2012, under the official TD-300-B designation. A later revision adds the TD-300-C with a higher critical altitude.

== Design and development ==
In 2008, Teledyne Continental's new president, Rhett Ross, announced that the company is very concerned about future availability of 100LL avgas, and as a result will develop a Diesel engine in the 300 hp (220 kW) range for certification in 2009 or 2010.

Rather than develop a new Diesel engine from scratch, Continental decided to license an existing design to develop. The company did not release details on which engine they licensed, but the aviation media have identified it as the French SMA SR305-230 engine.

== Specifications (CD-230) ==
Data from Continental.

=== General characteristics ===
- Type: Four cylinder, horizontally-opposed diesel engine
- Bore: 4.96 in (126 mm)
- Stroke: 3.94 in (100 mm)
- Displacement: 304 cu in (4,982 cc)
- Length: 32.3 to 32.85 in (820 to 834 mm)
- Width: 36.65 in (931 mm)
- Height: 31.50 to 37.9 in (800 to 963 mm)
- Dry weight: 450 lb (204.1 kg)

=== Components ===
- Fuel type: Jet-A or Jet-A1

=== Performance ===
- Power output: 230 hp (172 kW) at 2200 rpm
- Compression ratio: 17:1
- Fuel consumption: 10.95 U.S. gallons (41.5 L; 9.12 imp gal)/hr

== See also ==
Related development

- SMA SR305-230

Comparable engines

- Austro Engine E4
- Thielert Centurion

Related lists

- List of aircraft engines
