= SMA SR460 =

French diesel aircraft engine

SR460
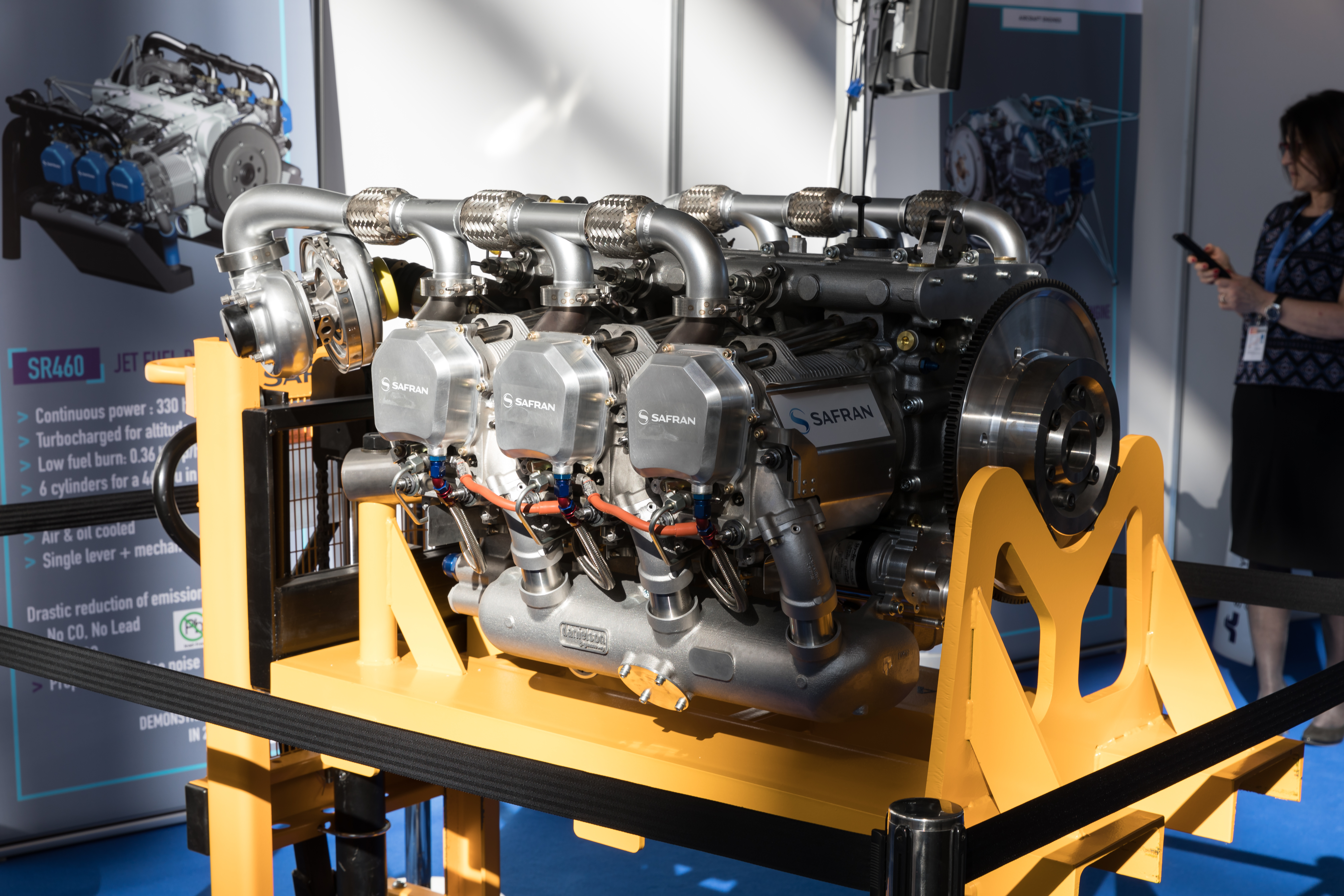
- SMA SR460
- Type: Aircraft engine
- National origin: France
- Manufacturer: SMA Engines

The SMA SR460 is a French diesel aircraft engine, under development by SMA Engines of Bourges for use in light aircraft.

== Design and development ==
The SR460 is a six-cylinder four-stroke, horizontally-opposed, 7,500 cc (457.7 cu in) displacement, air and oil-cooled, direct-drive, diesel engine design. It will produce 330 to 400 hp (246 to 298 kW), depending on the model.

== Specifications (SMA SR460) ==
Data from Tacke

=== General characteristics ===
- Type: Six-cylinder, four-stroke, diesel aircraft engine
- Displacement: 7,500 cc (457.7 cu in)
- Dry weight: 270 kg (595.2 lb)

=== Components ===
- Fuel type: diesel fuel/Jet A
- Cooling system: air and oil
- Reduction gear: none

=== Performance ===
- Power output: 330 to 400 hp (246 to 298 kW)

== See also ==
- SMA SR305-230

Related lists

- List of aircraft engines
