= Cessna 182 Skylane =

American light aircraft

Cessna 182
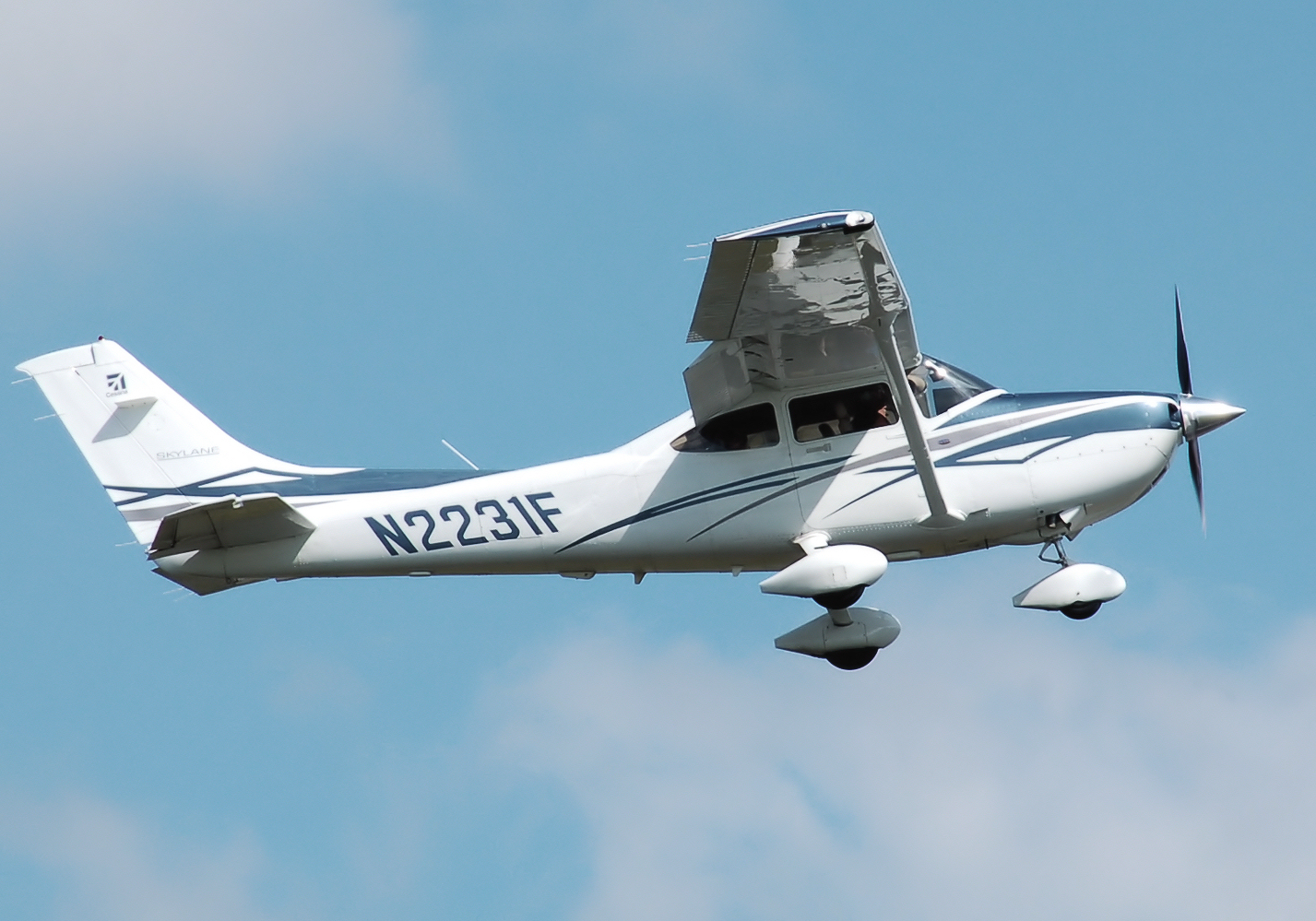

General information
- Type: Light utility aircraft
- National origin: United States
- Manufacturer: Cessna Aircraft Company
- Status: In production
- Number built: 23,237+

History
- Manufactured: 1956–1985, 1996–2012, 2015–present
- Introduction date: 1956
- First flight: 10 September 1955
- Developed from: Cessna 180

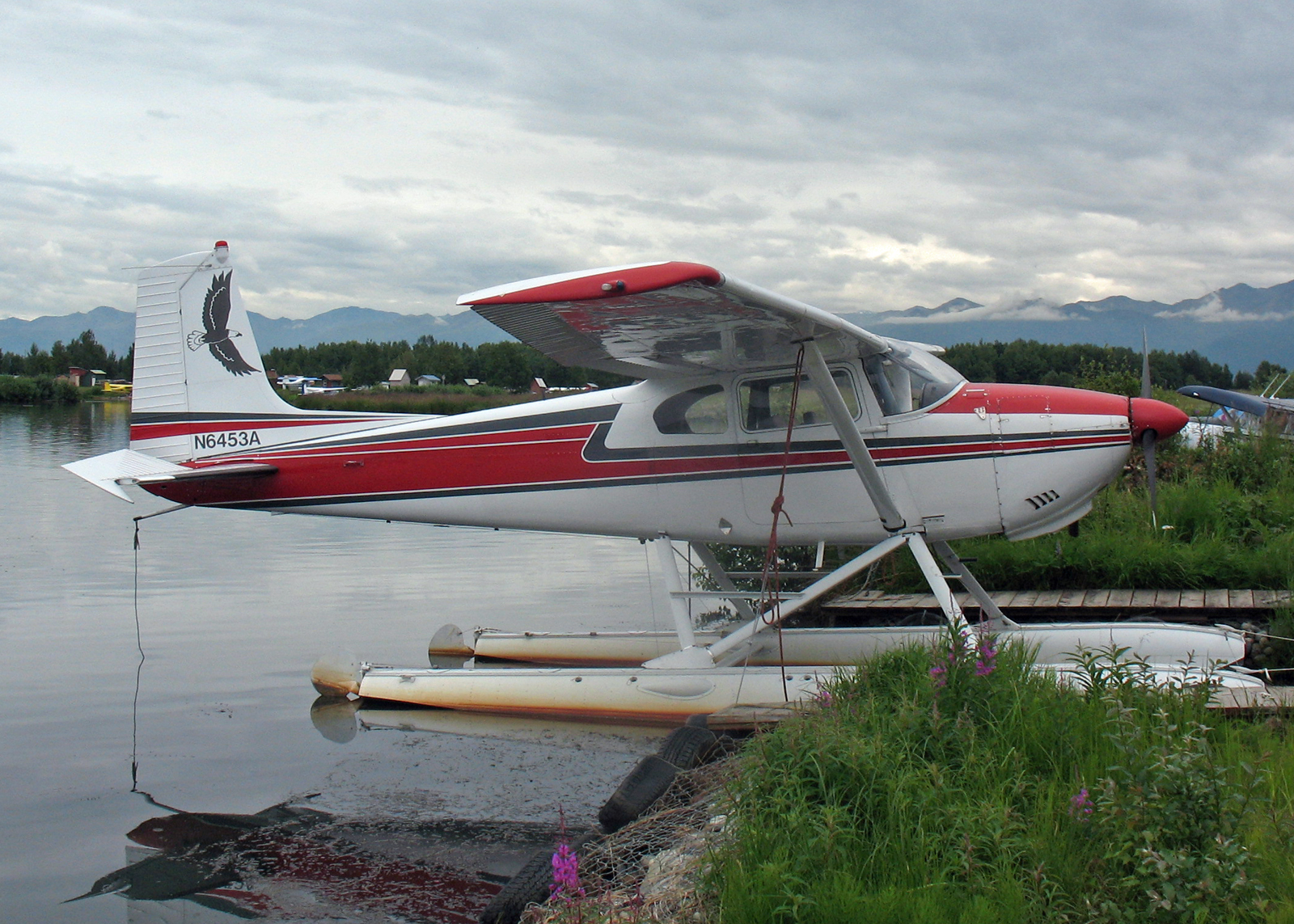
1956 Cessna 182 on floats

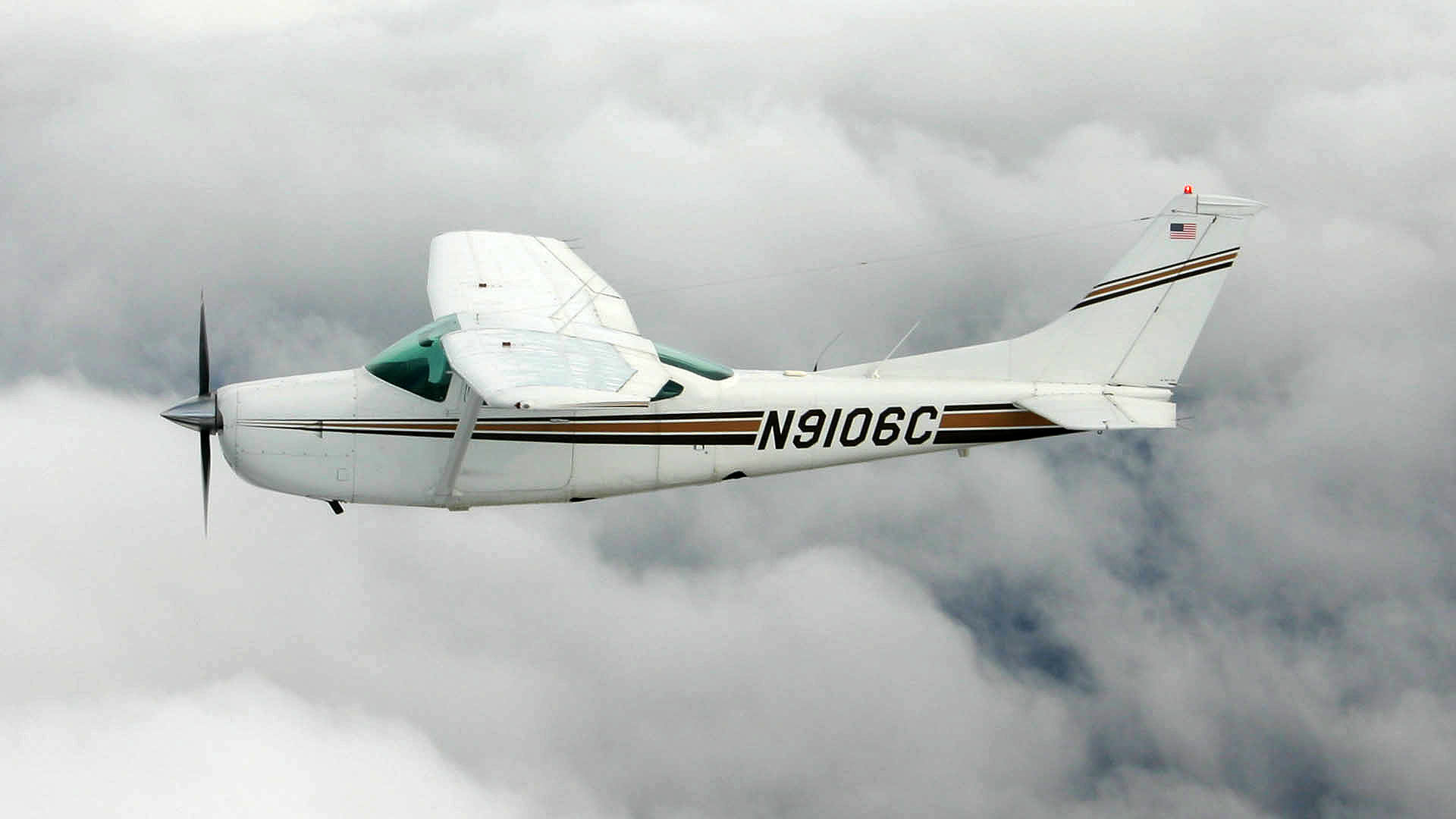
Cessna R182 Skylane RG, one of two variants with retractable landing gear

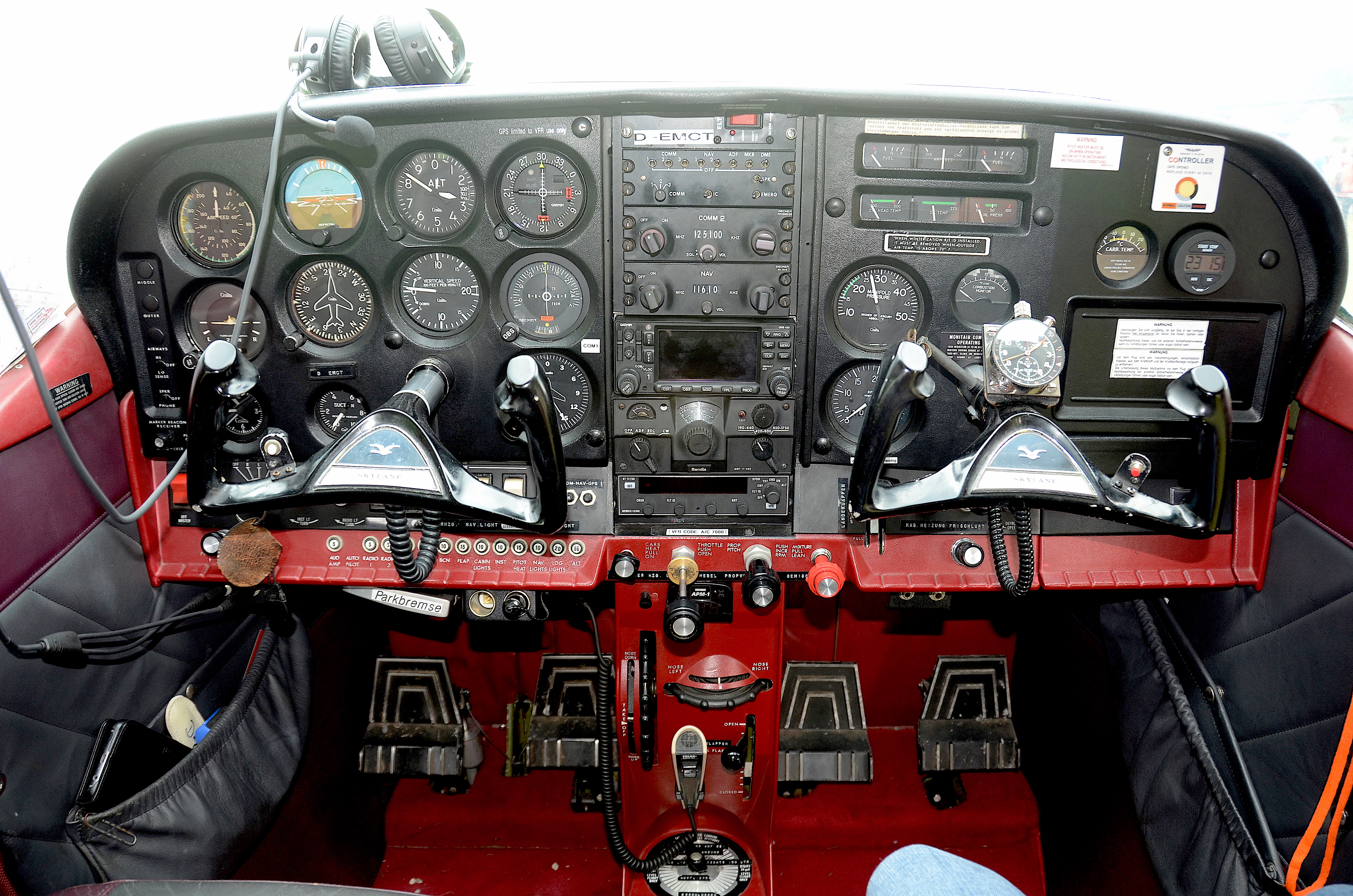
Cockpit of Cessna 182M Skylane

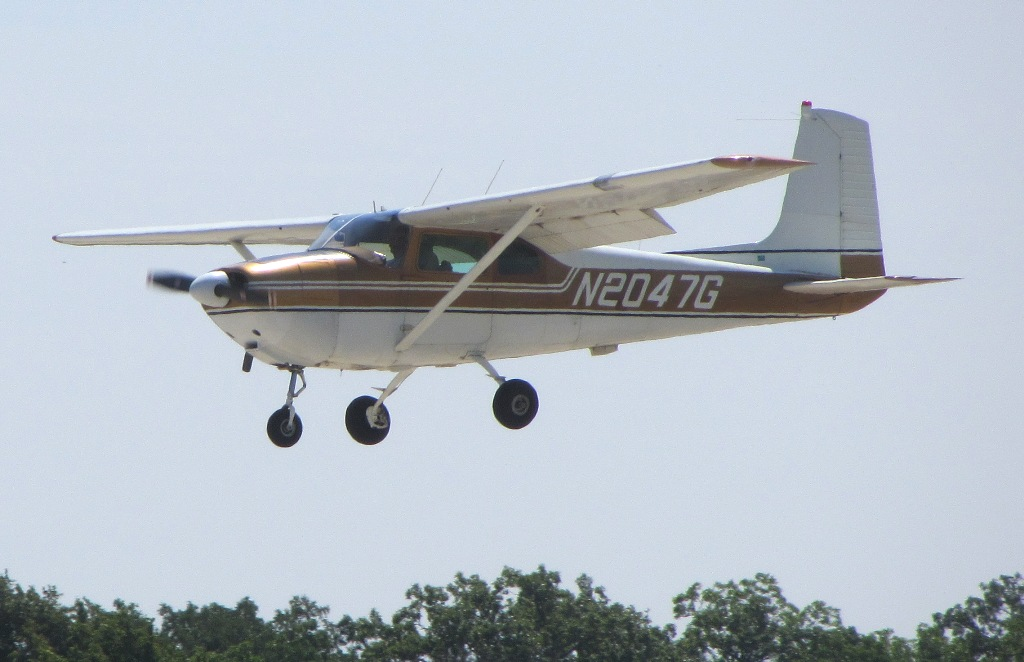
1958 Cessna 182A landing

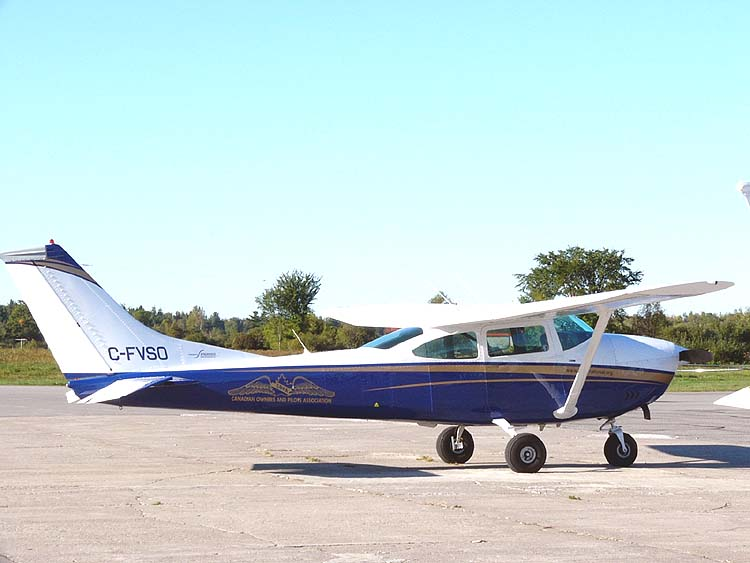
1967 model Cessna 182K belonging to the Canadian Owners and Pilots Association

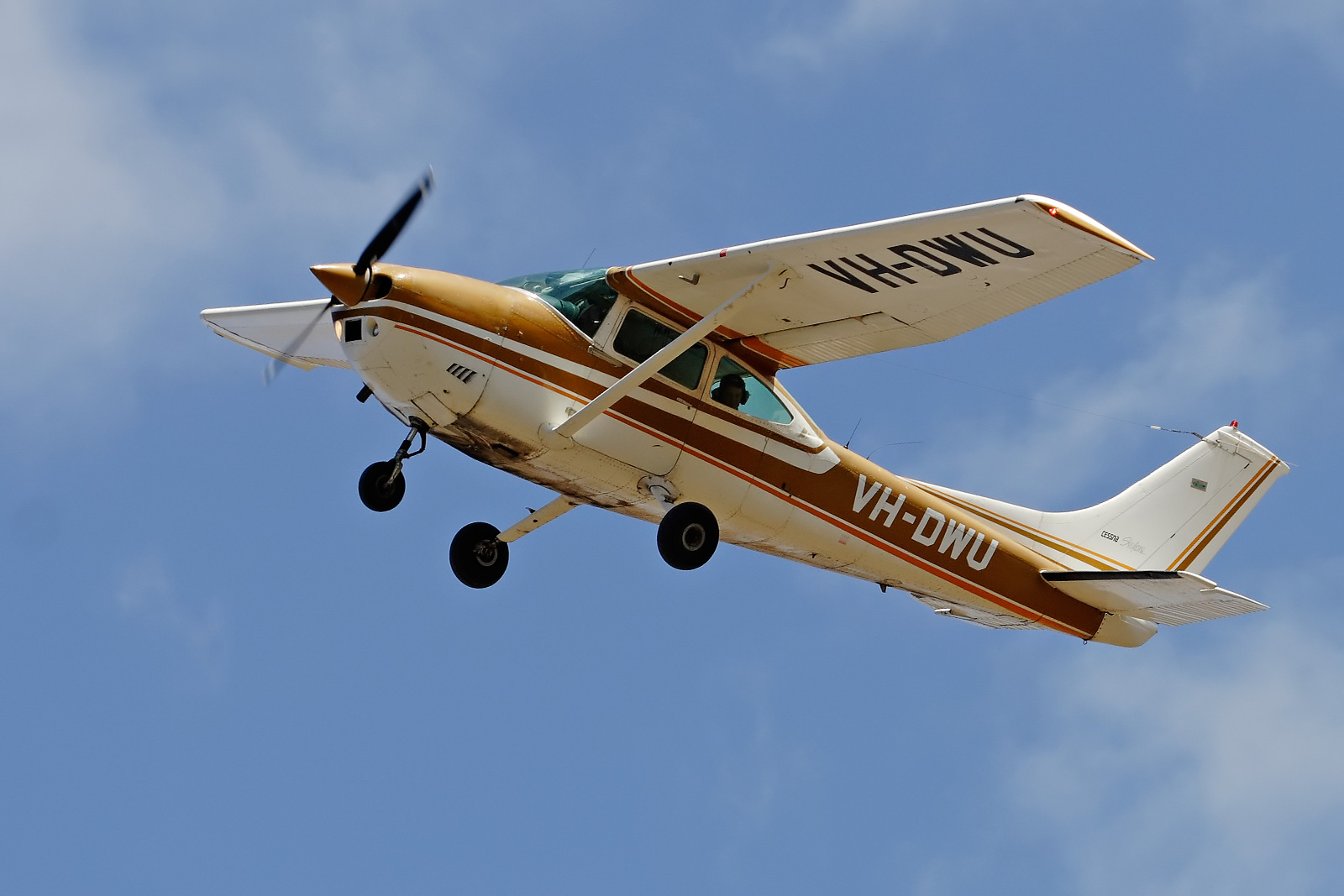
A Cessna 182P

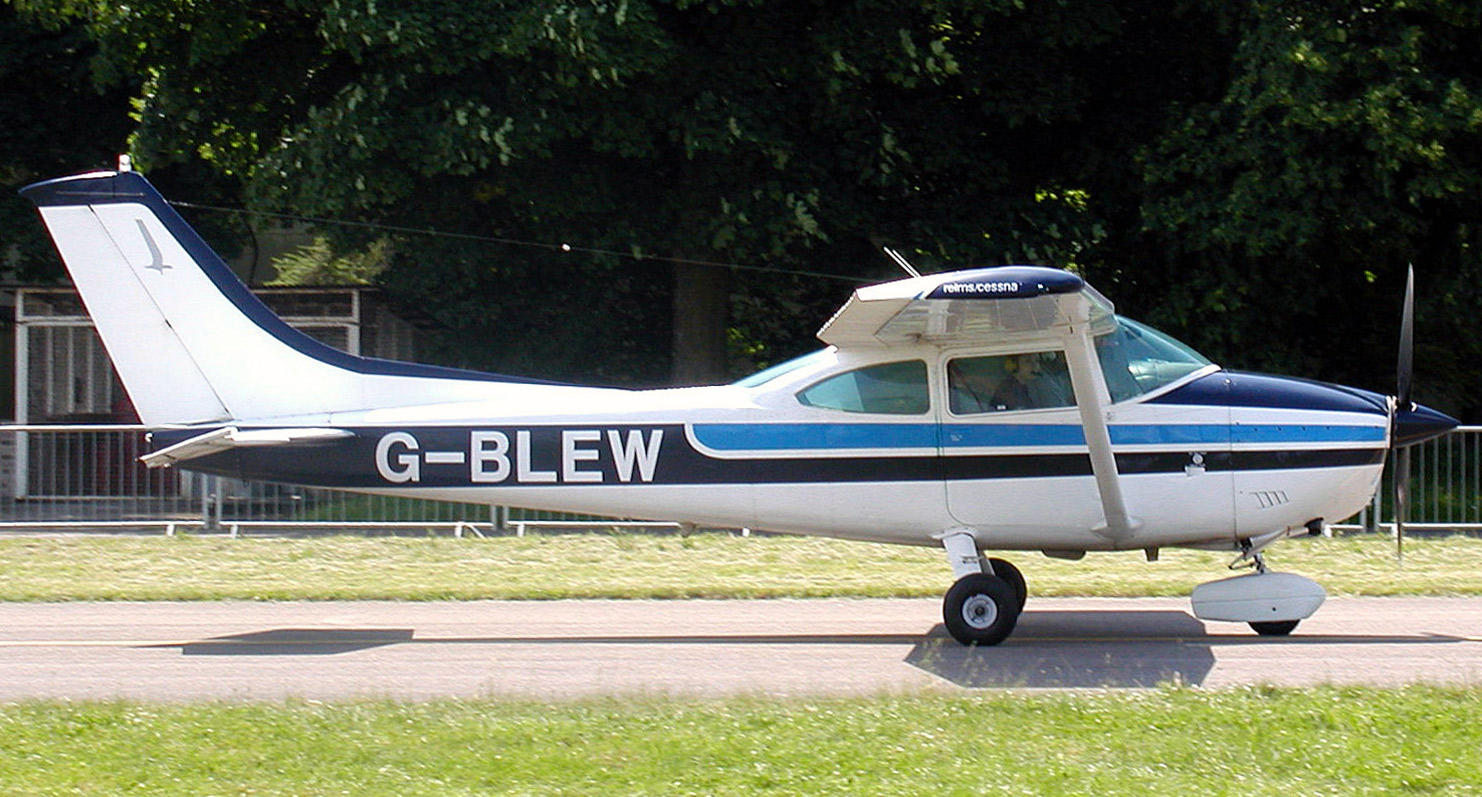
Reims Cessna F182Q

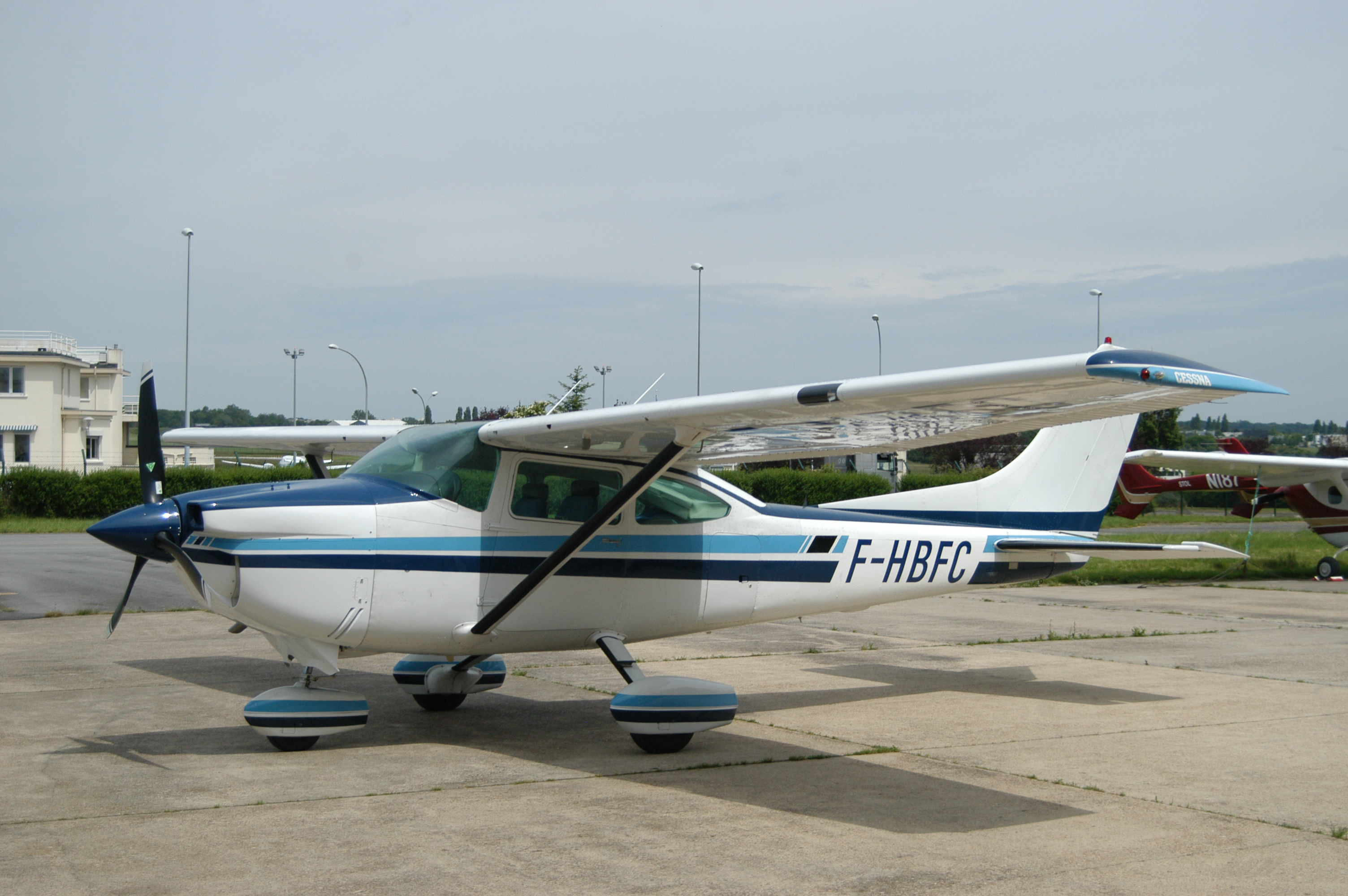
Cessna 182Q fitted with the SMA SR305-230 engine

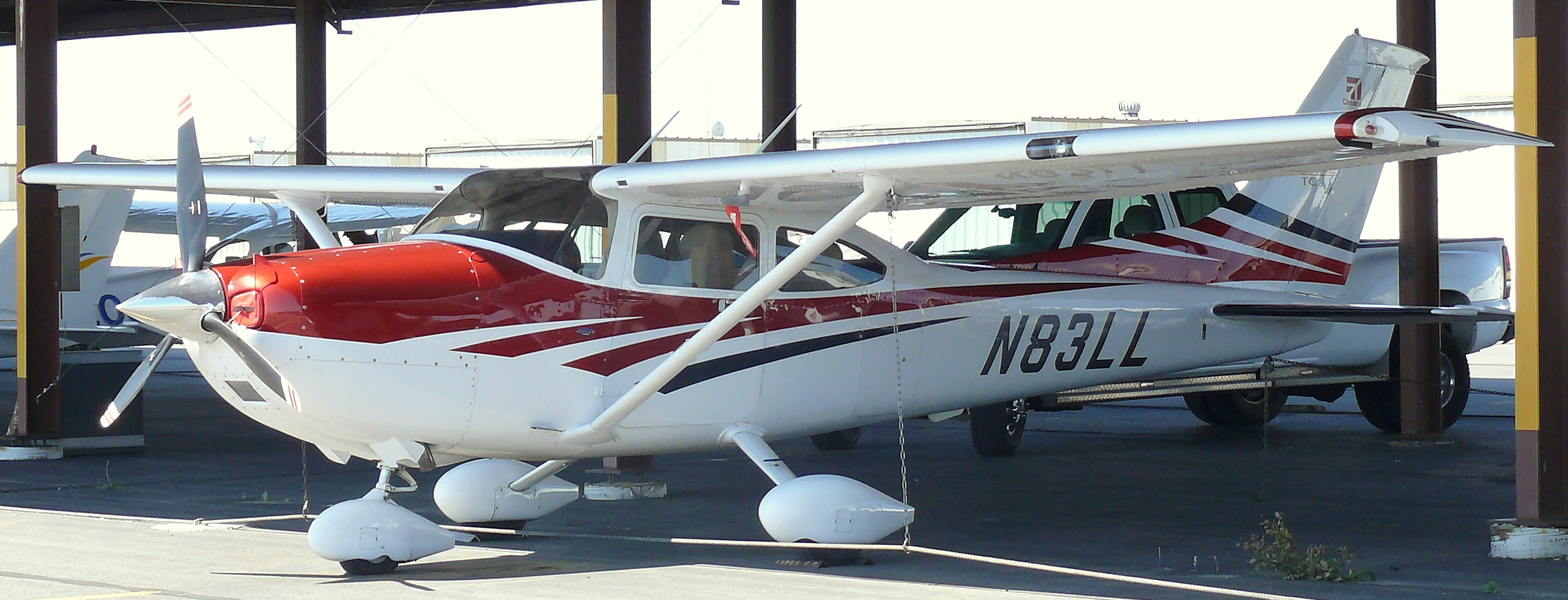
Cessna T182T

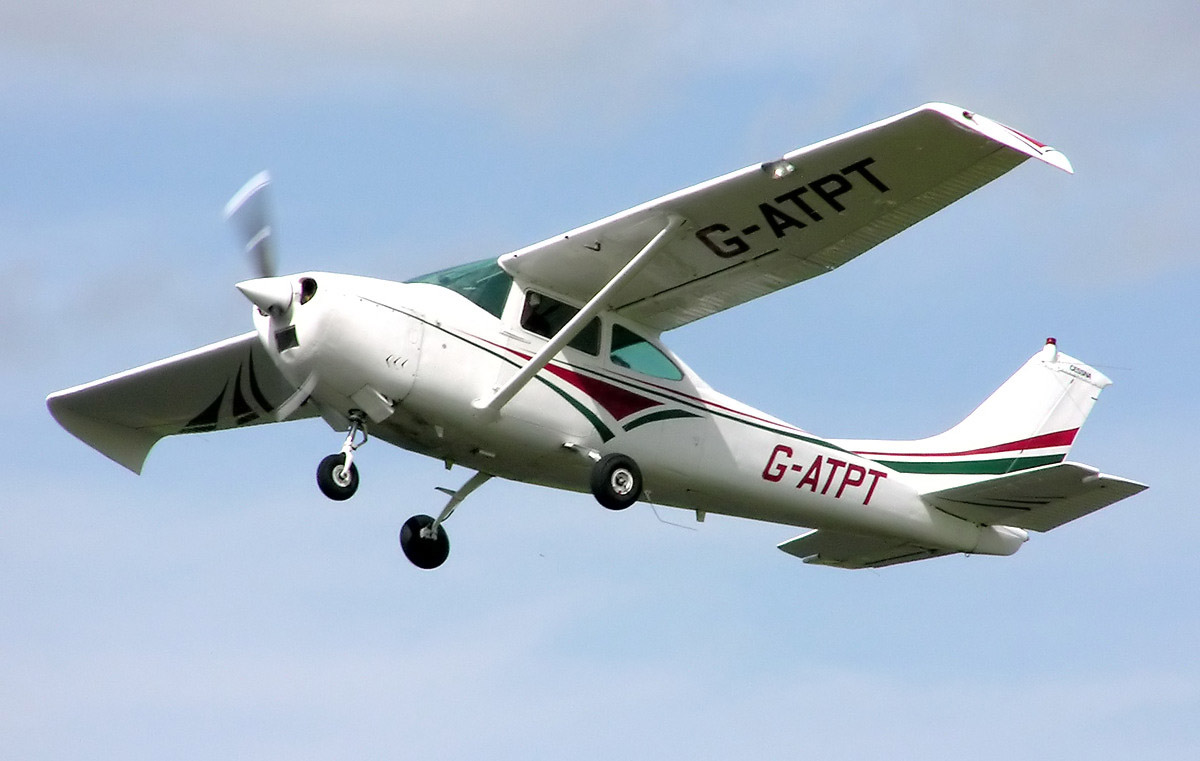
Cessna 182J

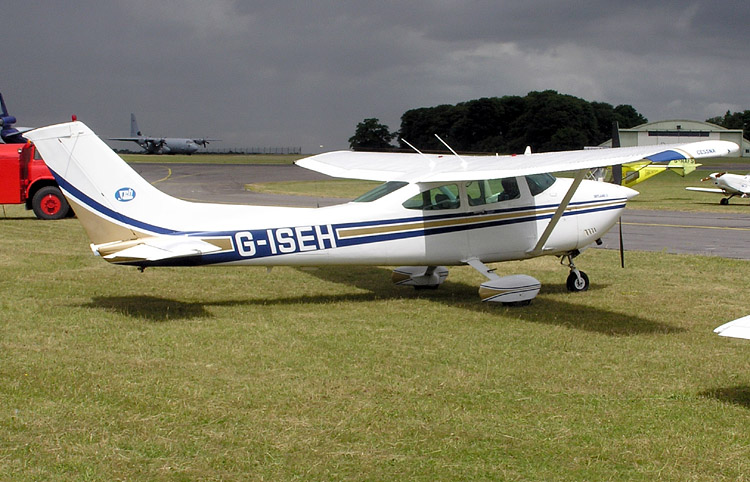
1981 Cessna 182R Skylane

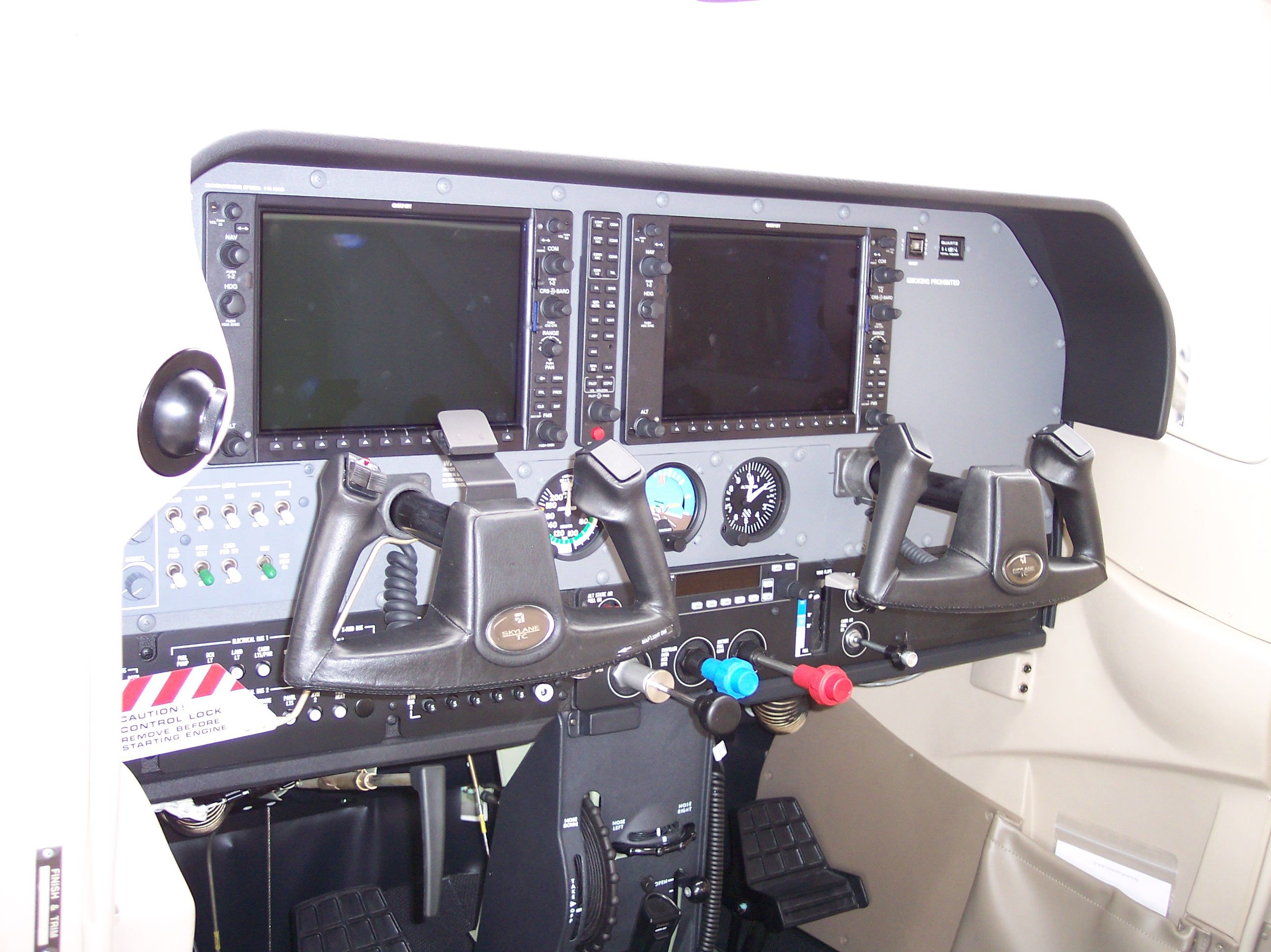
T182T cockpit with Garmin G1000

The Cessna 182 Skylane is an American four-seat, single-engined light airplane built by Cessna of Wichita, Kansas. It has the option of adding an additional two child seats in the baggage area.

Introduced in 1956, the 182 has been produced in several variants, including a version with retractable landing gear, and is the second-most popular Cessna model still in production after the 172.

== Development ==
The Cessna 182 was introduced in 1956 as a tricycle gear variant of the 180. In 1957, the 182A variant was introduced, followed by a deluxe version the following year known as the Skylane. As production continued, later models were improved regularly with features such as a wider fuselage, swept tailfin with rear "omni-vision" window, enlarged baggage compartment, higher gross weights, landing gear changes, etc. The "restart" aircraft built after 1996 were different in many other details, including a different engine, new seating design, etc.

By mid-2013, Cessna planned to introduce the next model of the 182T, designated the JT-A, using the 227 hp (169 kW) SMA SR305-230 diesel engine running on Jet-A with a burn rate of 11 US gallons (42 L; 9.2 imp gal) per hour at cruise speed of 155 kn (287 km/h; 178 mph). Cessna has no timeline for the JT-A. The normally aspirated, avgas-fueled 182 went out of production in 2012, but came back in 2015.

Cessna 182s were also built in Argentina by DINFIA, as the A182, and in France by Reims Aviation, as the F182.

== Design ==
The Cessna 182 is an all-metal (mostly aluminum alloy) aircraft, although some parts – such as engine cowling nosebowl and wingtips – are made of fiberglass or thermoplastic material. Its wing has the same planform as the smaller Cessna 172 and the larger 205/206 series; however, some wing details, such as flap and aileron design, are the same as the 172 and are not like the 205/206 components.

=== Retractable gear ===
The retractable gear R182 and TR182 were offered from 1978 to 1986, without and with engine turbocharging, respectively. The model designation nomenclature differs from some other Cessna models with optional retractable gear. For instance, the retractable version of the Cessna 172 was designated as the 172RG and the 177RG, whereas the retractable gear version of the Cessna 182 is the R182. Cessna gave the R182 the marketing name of "Skylane RG".

The R182 and TR182 offer 10-15% improvement in climb and cruise speeds over their fixed-gear counterparts, and similarly, 10-15% better fuel economy at the same speeds at the expense of increased maintenance costs and decreased gear robustness. The 1978 R182 has a sea-level climb rate of 1,140 ft/min (5.8 m/s) and a cruising speed (75% BHP) at 7,500 feet (2,300 m) of 156 kn (289 km/h; 180 mph) TAS at standard temperature.

The landing-gear retraction system in the Skylane RG uses hydraulic actuators powered by an electrically driven pump. The system includes a gear position warning that emits an intermittent tone through the cabin speaker when the gear is in the retracted position and either the throttle is reduced below about 12 inHg (41 kPa) manifold pressure or the flaps are extended beyond 20°. In the event of a hydraulic pump failure, the landing gear may be lowered using a hand pump to pressurize the hydraulic system. The system does not, however, allow the landing gear to be manually retracted.

== Variants ==
Cessna has historically used model years similar to U.S. auto manufacturers, with sales of new models typically starting a few months prior to the actual calendar year.

182
Initial production version built only for the 1956 model year. Powered by a carbureted 230 hp (172 kW) Continental O-470-L piston engine, gross weight 2,550 lb (1,157 kg). Certified on 2 March 1956. 844 built.
182A
Introduced for the 1957 model year with manual flaps, redesigned landing gear for improved ground handling, and an increased gross weight of 2,650 lb (1,202 kg). A deluxe version was introduced for the 1958 model year as the Skylane with full exterior paint, wheel fairings, and an improved engine cowling with the exhaust stack moved to the right to improve engine cooling. Certified on 7 December 1956. 1713 total built; 911 (1957) and 802 (1958).
182B
1959 model year with a more streamlined cowling with cowl flaps, a new instrument panel cover, and improved ventilation. Certified on 22 August 1958. 802 built.
182C
1960 model year with a redesigned swept vertical tail and smaller wing root fillets. The cabin was also redesigned with more headroom, molded plastic control wheels, and a third cabin window. Certified on 8 July 1959. 650 built, plus four largely identical L-19L models for the Canadian Army.
182D
1961 model year with a key start switch, cam-lock cowling fasteners, and decreased landing gear height. Certified on 14 June 1960. 591 built.
182E
1962 model year with a cut-down rear fuselage with "Omni-Vision" rear windows, electric "Para-Lift" flaps, a redesigned horizontal stabilizer, elevator and rudder trim tabs, a new tailcone and wingtips, and 65 US gal (250 L) neoprene fuel bladders. Wheel fairings, which were previously exclusive to the deluxe Skylane model, were made standard on the 182E. Power was provided by a 230 hp (172 kW) Continental O-470-R piston engine and gross weight was increased to 2,800 lb (1,270 kg). Certified on 27 June 1961. 826 built.
182F
1963 model year with minor refinements, including magnesium rudder pedals. Certified on 1 August 1962. 635 built.
182G
1964 model year with redesigned rear and aft cabin windows for improved visibility. Certified on 19 July 1963. 786 built.
182H
1965 model year with new propeller spinner, increased horizontal stabilizer span, and one-piece windshield. Certified on 17 September 1964. 840 built.
182J
1966 model year with magnesium control wheels and new door latches. Certified on 20 October 1965. 941 built, plus 56 shipped to Argentina as the A182J.
182K
1967 model year with short-stroke oleo strut nose gear, increased vertical stabilizer tip length, and "Omni-Flash" rotating beacon. Certified on 3 August 1966. 880 built, plus 40 shipped to Argentina as the A182K.
182L
1968 model year with new boom microphone, pre-select flap controls, and relocated flight instruments. Certified on 28 July 1967. 820 built, plus 20 shipped to Argentina as the A182L.
182M
1969 model year with optional electroluminescent instrument panel lighting. A turn coordinator was added as standard equipment for the deluxe Skylane model. Certified on 19 September 1968. 750 built. An experimental version of this model was used to test a full cantilever wing originally intended for the Cessna 343 (later 187).
182N
Introduced for the 1970 model year with a more streamlined cowling, conical camber wingtips, a revised instrument panel, and gross weight increased to 2,950 lb (1,338 kg). The 1971 model year introduced shoulder harnesses for the front seats and improved cabin soundproofing. Certified on 17 September 1969. 770 total built; 390 (1970) and 380 (1971), plus 20 built by Argentina in 1972 as the A182N with the improvements of that year's 182P.
182P
Introduced for the 1972 model year with cowling-mounted landing/taxi lights, tubular steel main landing gear with increased track width, "Camber-Lift" wings with a new leading edge, a push-button annunciator panel, and redesigned control wheels. The 1973 model year introduced bonded cowl and cabin doors, a shock-mounted cowling, and an extended dorsal fairing. 1974 introduced tighter door/window seals, new engine cooling baffle seals, a constant-speed propeller, and optional 84 US gal (320 L; 70 imp gal) fuel tanks and oxygen system. 1975 introduced new wheel/brake fairings and the Skylane II with improved avionics. 1976 introduced a new 230 hp (172 kW) Continental O-470-S engine, as well as improved wing root fairings. Certified on 8 October 1971. 4,371 total built; 621 (1972), 1,040 (1973), 1,010 (1974), 820 (1975), and 880 (1976), plus 25 built in France by Reims Aviation in 1976 as the F182P. In 1976, Cessna stopped offering the baseline 182, and all subsequent models carried the "Skylane" name.
182Q Skylane
Introduced for the 1977 model year with a new 230 hp (172 kW) Continental O-470-U engine and instrument panel fasteners, as well as minor changes to the instrument panel. The 1978 model year introduced a new 28V electrical system, molded plastic control wheels, and an avionics master switch. 1979 saw the replacement of the fuel bladders with a 88 US gal (330 L) wet wing as well as the introduction of a redesigned brake master cylinder and an alternator control unit (ACU). 1980 introduced a redesigned audio panel, marker beacon, flap position control indicator, and flap system circuitry as well as an optional writing table behind the pilots' seats. Certified on 28 July 1976. 2,537 total built; 790 (1977), 624 (1978), 709 (1979), and 414 (1980), plus 39 built by Reims in 1977 as the F182Q.
182R/T182 Skylane
Introduced for the 1981 model year with an increased gross takeoff weight of 3,100 lb (1,406 kg) (landing remained at 2,950 lb (1,338 kg)), a new door latch system, and wing root vents. A new model, the T182 (alternatively T182R), was also introduced with a turbocharged 235 hp (175 kW) Lycoming O-540-L3C5D piston engine. The 1982 model year featured only minor changes. 1983 introduced an improved O-470-U, increased flap extension speed, a low vacuum warning light, an improved avionics cooling fan, improved rear seat ventilation, and an optional split-switch electric elevator trim system. Certified on 29 August 1980. 895 total built; 339 (1981), 237 (1982), 74 (1983), 65 (1984), 106 (1985), and 74 (1986) before all 182 production stopped.
182S Skylane
Skylane production resumed in 1997 with the 182S, with Cessna dropping the model year system used on previous models. The 182S was powered by a fuel-injected 230 hp (172 kW) Lycoming IO-540-AB1A5 and introduced multiple other improvements, such as new seats, cabin soundproofing, and corrosion proofing. Wheel fairings were no longer standard, though they were still an optional feature along with IFR GPS, and a two-axis autopilot. A "Millennium edition" was introduced in 2000 with special exterior and interior appointments. Certified on 3 October 1996. 941 built.
182T/T182T Skylane
Improved 182S introduced in 2001 with a redesigned cowling and wheel fairings, 12V power port, a smaller gear strut step, and other improvements. The T182T is powered by a turbocharged and fuel-injected 235 hp (175 kW) Lycoming TIO-540-AK1A piston engine, a 4-place oxygen system, and other improvements for high altitude flight. 2004 saw the introduction of the optional "Nav III" avionics package and an optional leather interior. 2005 introduced redesigned wingtips, new landing lights, and optional AmSafe inflatable restraints (which became standard in 2009). 2007 introduced the Garmin G1000 instrument system as standard, as well as multiple optional additional avionics packages. Certified on 23 February 2001. The T182T was produced from 2001 to 2013, and resumed production in 2023.

=== Special versions ===
R182 Skylane RG/TR182 Turbo Skylane RG
Introduced for the 1978 model year with retractable landing gear, a 235 hp (175 kW) Lycoming O-540-J3C5D piston engine and a gross weight of 3,100 lb (1,406 kg). The 1979 model year increased fuel capacity from 75 US gal (280 L) to 88 US gal (330 L). Certified on 7 July 1977. The TR182 Turbo Skylane RG was powered by turbocharged 235 hp (175 kW) Lycoming O-540-L3C5D and was certified on 12 September 1978. At least 2,024 total built; 583 (1978), 729 (1979), 314 (1980), 169 (1981), 129 (1982), 44 (1983), 25 (1984), and 31 (1985), with production continuing into 1986. Reims also built a total of 69; 21 (1978), 24 (1979), and 24 (1980) as the FR182 in France.
J182T Turbo Skylane JT-A
Powered by a 227 hp (169 kW) SMA SR305-230 diesel engine. It burns 11 US gallons (42 L; 9.2 imp gal) per hour of Jet-A fuel and cruises at 156 kn (289 km/h). The model was first flown in May 2013, and as of July 2015, FAA certification is on hold indefinitely. Originally introduced as the Turbo Skylane NXT, Cessna changed the name to avoid confusion with the Remos NXT. Only 16 aircraft (one prototype and 15 production) had been built by 2014. A majority of orders for the Turbo Skylane JT-A had been canceled by 2017, and the aircraft was eventually discontinued.
Robertson STOL 182
An aftermarket 182 STOL conversion certified in 1967 that changes the leading edge shape and aileron controls and lowers the stall speed below 35 mph (56 km/h).

== Operators ==
=== Civil users ===
The 182 is used by a multitude of civil operators, cadet organizations, and flight schools worldwide.

=== Government operators ===
Argentina

- Argentine Federal Police - one A182L from 2001 is still in service for training as of 2020.

Belgium

- Federal Police

Canada

- Transport Canada – one, sold in 2010

United States

- Civil Air Patrol – used for inland and coastal search and rescue, homeland security support, and airborne communications repeater service
- Federal Bureau of Investigation - at least 27 used as surveillance aircraft equipped with optical, infrared and cellphone ELINT equipment

=== Military operators ===
Afghanistan

- Afghan Air Force

Argentina

- Army Aviation

Austria

- Austrian Air Force - 2x Cessna 182 A/B

Belize

- Belize Defence Force Air Wing

Canada

- Canadian Army – 5 × L-182, retired 1970

Dominican Republic

- Dominican Air Force - one example with retractable gear

Ecuador

- Ecuadorian Army – 4

El Salvador

- Salvadoran Air Force

Guatemala
Indonesia

- Indonesian Air Force – 2x Cessna 182T

Mexico

- Mexican Air Force Received 73 during 1999–2000

United Arab Emirates

- United Arab Emirates Air Force

Uruguay

- Uruguayan Air Force

Venezuela

- Venezuelan Army
- Venezuelan Air Force

=== Skydiving operators ===
The Cessna 182 is widely used in the skydiving industry. Its high-wing design provides exceptional stability at low speeds and allows for easier exits compared to low-wing aircraft. For skydiving operations, the aircraft is modified by removing passenger seats, replacing the standard door with an upward-opening door, and adding a large external step.

== Specifications (Cessna 182T) ==
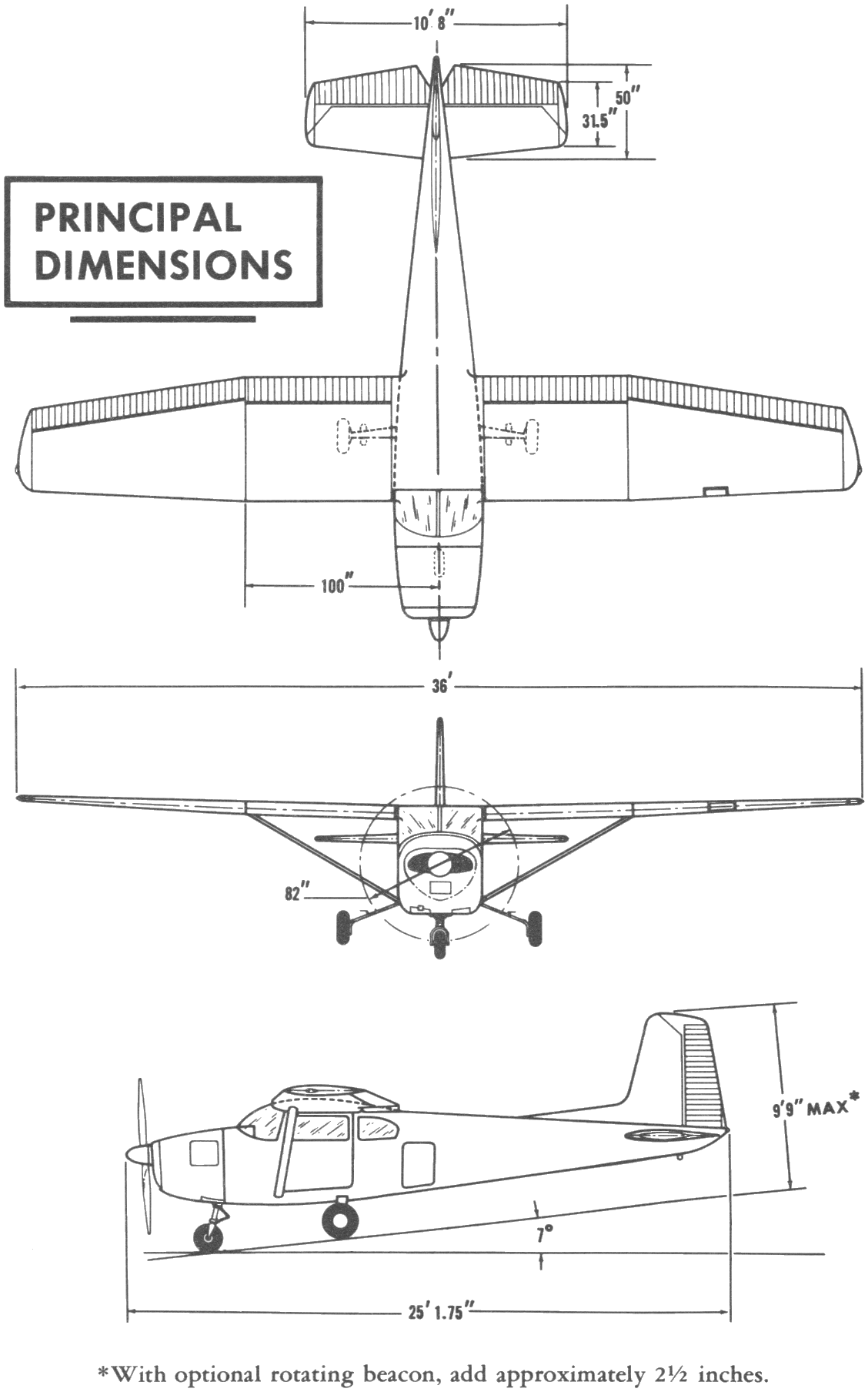
3-view line drawing of the Cessna 182B Skylane

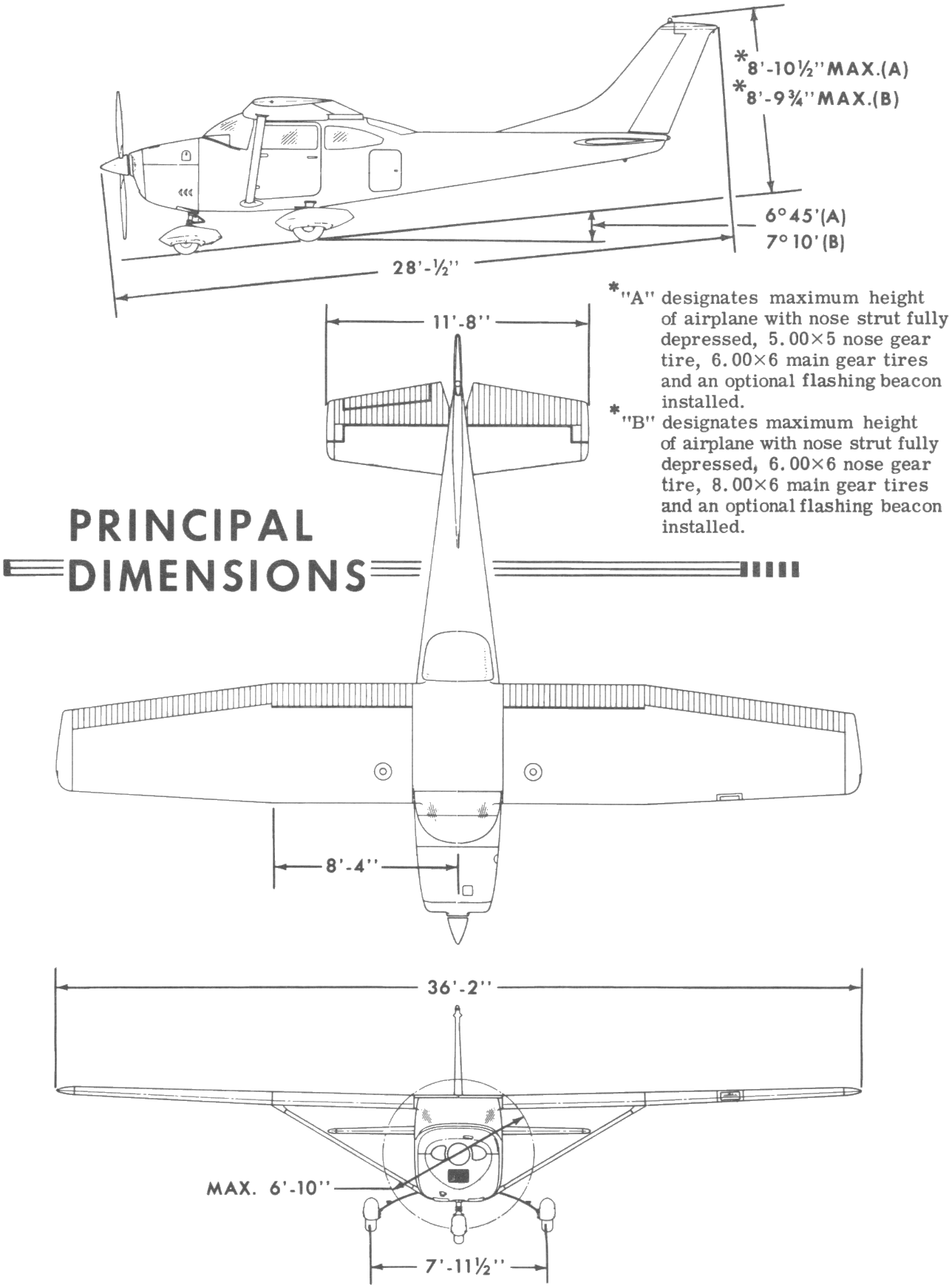
3-view line drawing of the Cessna 182M Skylane

Data from Cessna and AOPA

General characteristics

- Crew: 1
- Capacity: 3 passengers
- Length: 29 ft 0 in (8.84 m)
- Wingspan: 36 ft 0 in (10.97 m)
- Height: 9 ft 4 in (2.84 m)
- Wing area: 174 sq ft (16.2 m^{2})
- Empty weight: 1,970 lb (894 kg)
- Max takeoff weight: 3,100 lb (1,406 kg)
- Powerplant: 1 × Lycoming IO-540-AB1A5 air-cooled flat-six, 230 hp (170 kW)
- Propellers: 3-bladed constant speed

Performance

- Maximum speed: 150 kn (170 mph, 280 km/h)
- Cruise speed: 145 kn (167 mph, 269 km/h)
- Stall speed: 49 kn (56 mph, 91 km/h)
- Never exceed speed: 175 kn (201 mph, 324 km/h)
- Range: 930 nmi (1,070 mi, 1,720 km)
- Service ceiling: 18,100 ft (5,500 m)
- Rate of climb: 924 ft/min (4.69 m/s)

== See also ==
Related development

- Cessna 180
- Wren 460 (STOL version)

Aircraft of comparable role, configuration, and era

- AirLony Skylane – ultralight aircraft inspired by the Cessna 182
- Aeropilot Legend 540 - scale version built from carbon fiber
- Beechcraft Bonanza
- Cirrus SR20
- Diamond DA40
- Piper Cherokee
- Tecnam P2010

Related lists

- List of civil aircraft

== Bibliography ==
- Rivas, Santiago (September 2020). "Fighting Criminals all over Argentina". Air International. Vol. 99, no. 3. pp. 80–83. ISSN 0306-5634.
- Simpson, Rob (May 2000). "General Aviation marches into its second century". Air International. Vol. 58, no. 5. pp. 294–297. ISSN 0306-5634.
