= Aeronautics Defense Dominator =

Israeli UAV modified from Diamond DA42

Dominator
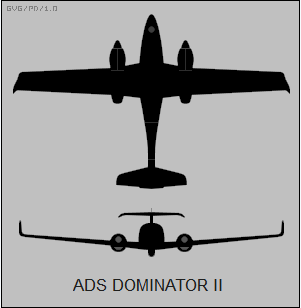

General information
- Type: Reconnaissance UAV
- National origin: Israel
- Manufacturer: Aeronautics Defense Systems

History
- Developed from: Diamond DA42 Twin Star

The Aeronautics Defense Dominator is an Israeli Medium-Altitude Long-Endurance (MALE) unmanned aerial vehicle (UAV) manufactured by Aeronautics Defense Systems. It is based on the Austrian Diamond DA42 Twin Star passenger aircraft. Dominator UAV executes intelligence, surveillance and reconnaissance (ISR) operations.

== Operational history ==
The aircraft made its first test flight in July 2009. The unmanned aircraft has an endurance of 28 hours with a 900 lb (410 kg) payload and flies at 75-190 knots (140–350 km/h) to a maximum altitude of 30,000 ft (9,100 m).

== Operators ==
- Mexico — 2 Dominator XPs
- Thailand - Ordered in August 2018. Locally designated B.T.3 (Thai: บ.ต.๓).
- Turkey - 1 Dominator 2, being used to monitor borders.

== Specifications ==
General characteristics

- Crew: None
- Length: 8.00 m (26 ft 3 in)
- Wingspan: 13.42 m (44 ft 0 in)
- Gross weight: 1,200 kg (2,640 lb)
- Powerplant: 2 × Thielert diesel engines , 101 kW (135 hp) each

Performance

- Maximum speed: 354 km/h (219 mph, 190 kn)
- Service ceiling: 9,100 m (30,000 ft)

== See also ==
- Joint Direct Attack Munition
- List of Unmanned Aerial Vehicles
- Unmanned combat air vehicle

Related development

- Diamond DA42 Twin Star
