= Aerostat (disambiguation) =

An aerostat is an aircraft that remains aloft through the use of lighter-than-air gases. A narrower and more technical meaning refers only to tethered balloons.

Aerostat may also refer to:

== Airships ==
Airships are powered aerostats:

- Airship, or dirigible, any aerostat that can be manoeuvred through the air using propellers, rudders, etc.
- Blimp, an airship with no structural framework, using only gas pressure to maintain its shape
- Rigid airship, uses only a structural framework to maintain its shape
- Semi-rigid airship, uses a partial structural framework in combination with gas pressure to maintain its shape

== Balloons ==
Balloons are unpowered aerostats:

- Balloon (aircraft)
- Gas balloon
- Hot air balloon
- Vacuum balloon

=== Tethered ===
The term aerostat is sometimes used to refer specifically to tethered balloons:

- Barrage balloon
- Observation balloon

=== Untethered ===
- Espionage balloon
- Fire balloon

== Hybrids ==
Hybrids combine aerostatic buoyancy and aerodynamic lift.

=== Powered ===
- Hybrid airship

=== Unpowered ===
- Kytoon

== Other uses ==
- Tethered Aerostat Radar System
- Akashdeep Aerostat
- RT Aerostats Systems

== See also ==
- Aerostatics
- Balloon
- Sky lantern
