= Diamond DA40 Diamond Star =

Family of light aircraft

DA40 Diamond Star
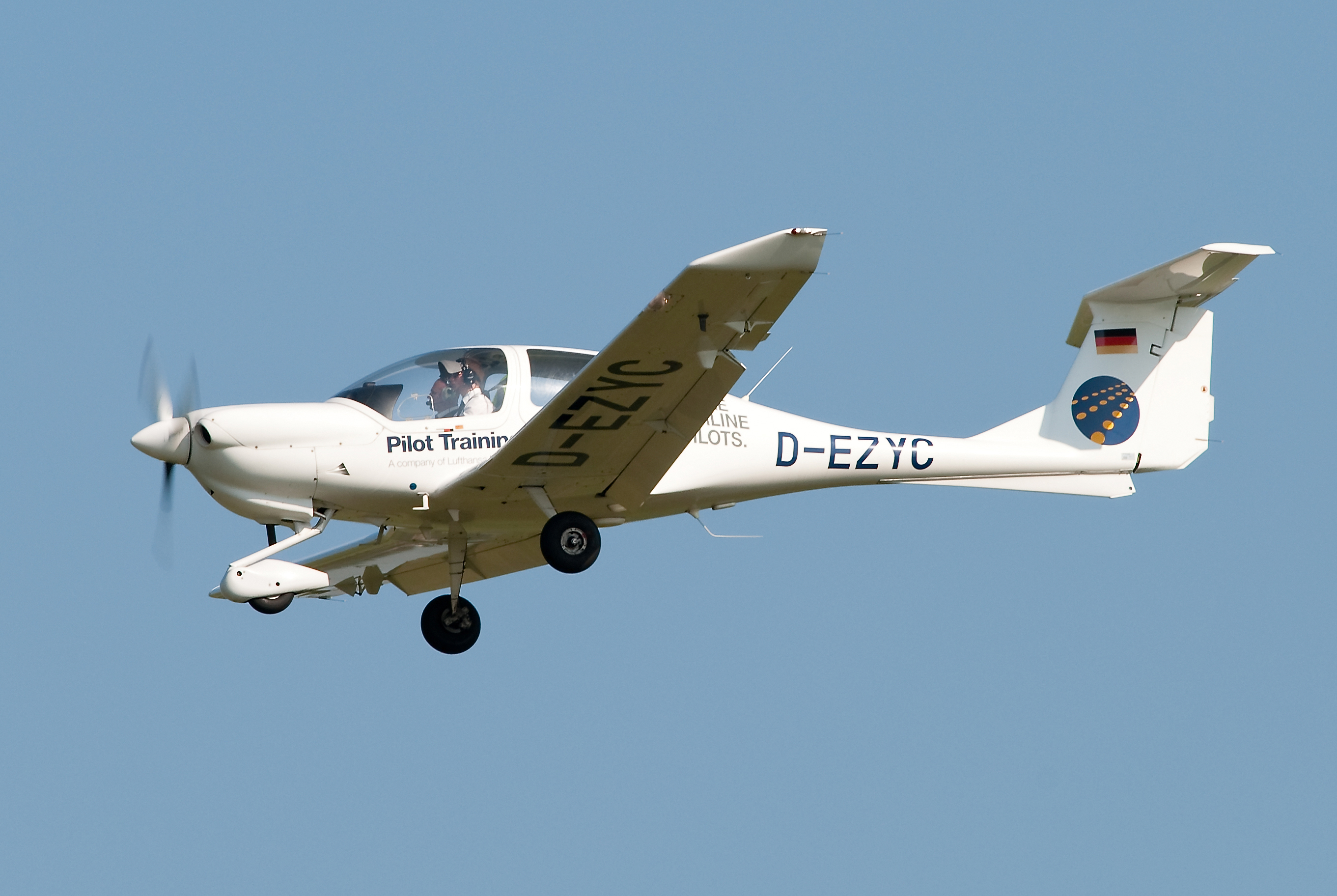

General information
- Type: Light aircraft
- Manufacturer: Diamond Aircraft Industries
- Status: In production
- Number built: 2,200 (December 2020)

History
- Manufactured: 1997–present
- First flight: 5 November 1997
- Developed from: Diamond DA20

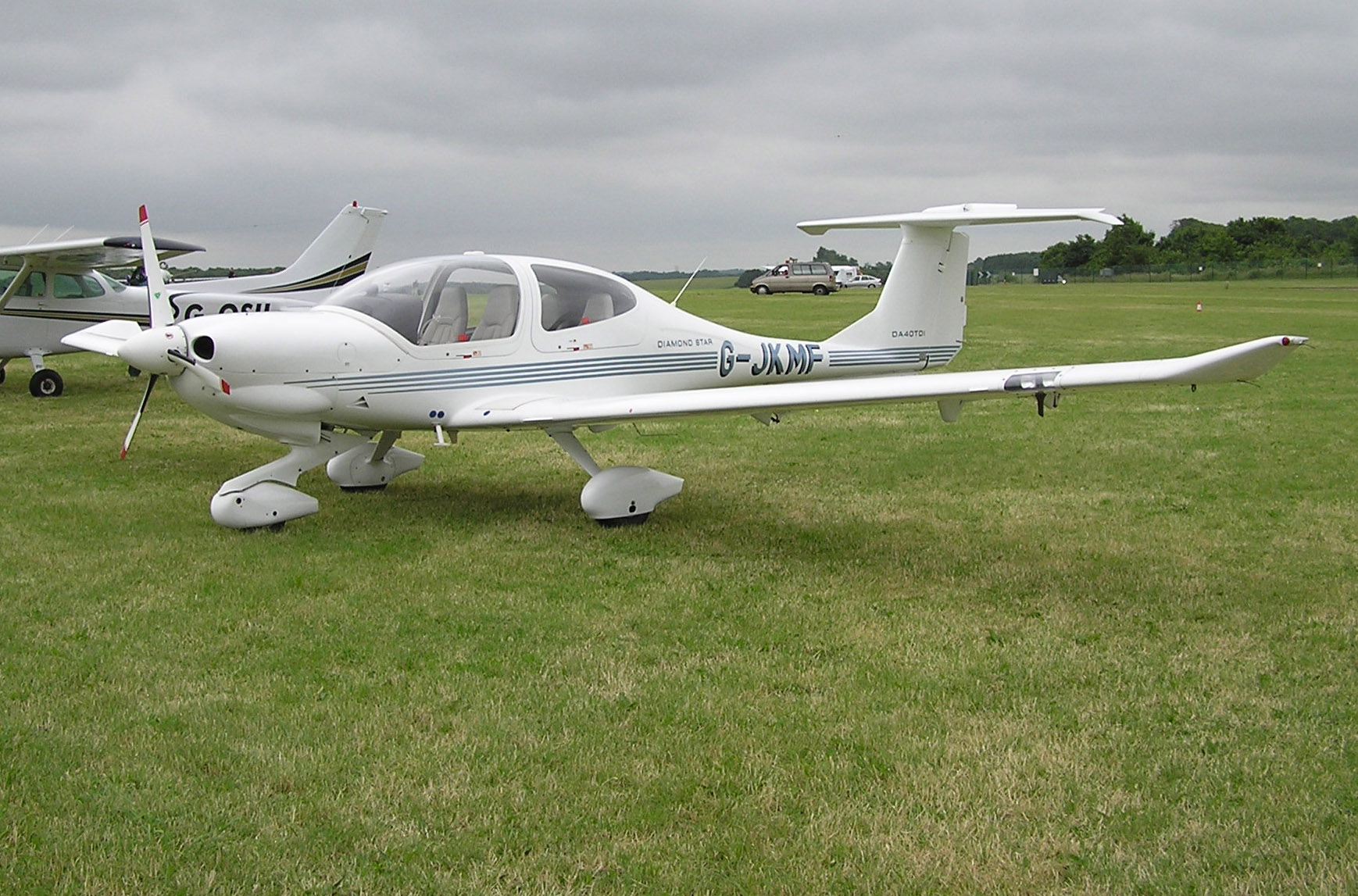
Diamond Star DA40-TDI diesel powered model

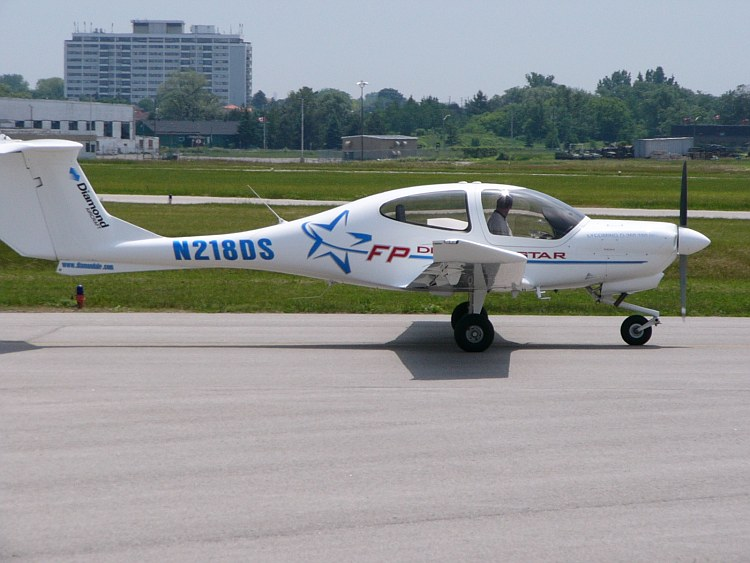
Diamond Star DA40 FP Fixed Pitch variant

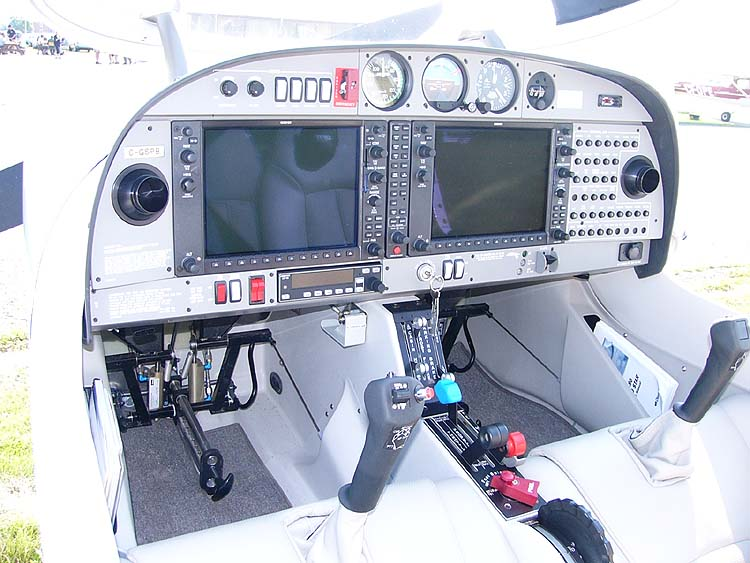
Diamond Star DA40-180 instrument panel showing the Garmin G1000 glass cockpit installation

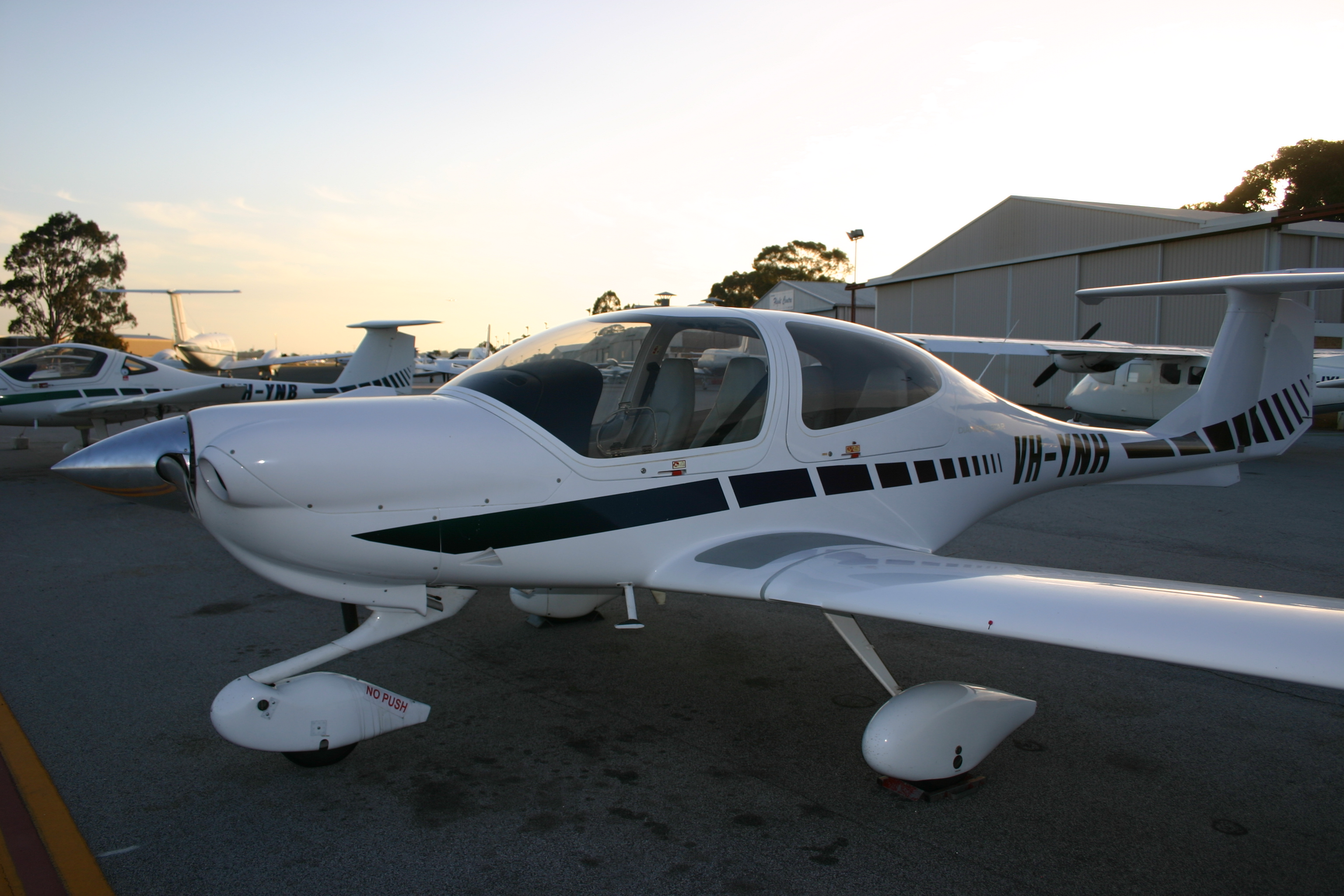
G1000-equipped Diamond DA-40

The Diamond DA40 Diamond Star is an Austrian four-seat, single-engine, light aircraft constructed from composite materials. Built in both Austria and Canada, it was developed as a four-seat version of the earlier DA20 by Diamond Aircraft Industries.

By the end of December 2020, 2,200 DA40s had been delivered, including 500 NG models.

== Development ==
Based on the success of the earlier DV20/DA20 two-seat aircraft, the company designed a four-seat variant, the DA40 Diamond Star. The Rotax 914-powered prototype DA40-V1, registered OE-VPC, first flew on 5 November 1997 and was followed by a second prototype DA40-V2 (registered OE-VPE) which was powered by a Continental IO-240. In 1998 a third prototype DA40-V3 flew powered by a Lycoming IO-360 engine. Four more test aircraft were produced followed by the first production aircraft in 2000. JAR23 certification of the IO-360 production variant was obtained in October 2000. In 2002 the production of the Lycoming-engined variant was moved to Canada and the Austrian factory concentrated on diesel-engined variants. The first flight of the Diesel DA40D was made on 28 November 2002.

In late 2006, the XL and FP models replaced the DA40-180. The FP replaced the fixed pitch propeller version of the 180 and the XL replaced the constant speed propeller version. The major difference between the new models and the 180 is the higher maximum cruise speeds. The DA40-XL is approximately four knots faster than the preceding DA40-180/G1000 with the two-blade Hartzell propeller and the "Speed Gear" option. The XL's speed increase is mostly due to the Powerflow exhaust system.

In the last half of 2007 the company updated the DA40 line by introducing the XLS and CS versions and eliminated the FP model. The XLS is the deluxe version, with the integration of some options into the standard offering including a Powerflow tuned exhaust, WAAS-capable G1000, GDL69 datalink, and TAS traffic alert system. The CS is the budget version, with fewer standard features.

Both CS and XLS versions of the DA40 use the Lycoming IO-360-M1A fuel injected engine. The major difference is the choice of propeller, with the CS using a Hartzell two-blade aluminum constant speed prop and the XLS using an MT composite three-blade unit.

Capacity is available for up to 1,000 aircraft a year to be produced with certification by the European Aviation Safety Agency in 2008.

Past DA40 models were available with either traditional mechanical instruments or an optional Garmin G1000 glass cockpit suite. Current production DA40s are built only with the Garmin G1000 as standard equipment. In April 2008, Diamond introduced the optional availability of Garmin Synthetic Vision Technology on the DA40 XLS.

In October 2021, Diamond Aircraft announced an all-electric training variant, the eDA40, with initial flights scheduled for the second quarter of 2022 and EASA/FAA Part 23 certification expected in 2023. It should fly for 90 minutes, with a fast charge for 20 minutes turnarounds and operating costs 40% lower than piston aircraft.

== Design ==
The DA40 is a four-seat low-wing cantilever monoplane made from composite materials. It has a fixed tricycle landing gear and a T-tail.

The DA40 has officially appeared in only three versions, the DA 40, DA 40D and DA 40F, as documented on its type certificates. The various model names that the aircraft has been sold under are marketing names and are not officially recognized by the authorities that have certified the aircraft.

The DA40 was initially marketed as the DA40-180, powered by a fuel injected Textron Lycoming IO-360 M1A engine.

The DA40-XL has a constant speed propeller and is powered by a 180 hp (130 kW) Lycoming IO-360-M1A fuel injected engine. It has a maximum cruise speed of 147 kn (272 km/h; 169 mph), burning 9.2 gallons of Avgas per hour. Its maximum takeoff weight is 2,535 lb (1,150 kg).

The DA40-F (marketed as the "FP") has a fixed pitch propeller, a 180 hp (130 kW) Lycoming O-360-A4M engine, which has a carburetor rather than fuel injection and a more basic interior, but is otherwise similar to the XL.

The DA40-TDI uses a Thielert "Centurion" 135 hp (101 kW) diesel engine and burns diesel or jet fuel. It has a constant speed propeller and FADEC (single lever) engine control. The Diesel DA40D is not certified in the US.

Efforts to increase the DA40's cruising speed centered on the propeller and wheel spats. The wheel fairing streamlining was improved, a three-blade scimitar-type constant speed propeller was incorporated and the Powerflow exhaust system from the XL was retained. The canopy contour was also revised, with the sides being more vertical before curving into the roof, which provides more shoulder and head room.

Boarding the DA40 is via the leading edge of the wing, an unusual feature among low-wing aircraft. The aircraft's nosewheel is free-castoring and directional control while taxiing is by mainwheel differential braking.

DA40s are produced at Diamond's aircraft factories in Wiener Neustadt, Austria and in London, Ontario, Canada. A joint venture has also been set up in China with Shandong Bin Ao Aircraft Industries for production of the DA40 TDI (Diesel) in Shandong Province.

== Operational history ==
The DA40 has accumulated a very low accident record, particularly with regard to stall and spin accidents. Its overall and fatal accident rates are one-eighth that of the general aviation fleet and include no stall-related accidents. The level of safe operation is attributed to its high aspect ratio wing, low wing loading and benign flight characteristics. The aircraft can be trimmed full nose up, engine set to idle and it will descend at 600–1,200 feet per minute (180–370 m/min) at 48 kn (55 mph; 89 km/h) hands-off, a lower rate of descent than the competitor Cirrus SR22 can achieve with its airframe ballistic parachute deployed.

In a 2011 analysis by Aviation Consumer magazine, the DA40 was shown to have had a fatal accident rate of 0.35/100,000 hours, the lowest in US general aviation and considerably better than the market leading Cirrus SR20 and SR22, which that year had a combined fatal accident rate of 1.6/100,000, despite its full aircraft parachute system. By comparison, the Cessna 172 had a fatal accident rate of 0.45/100,000 hours.

== Variants ==
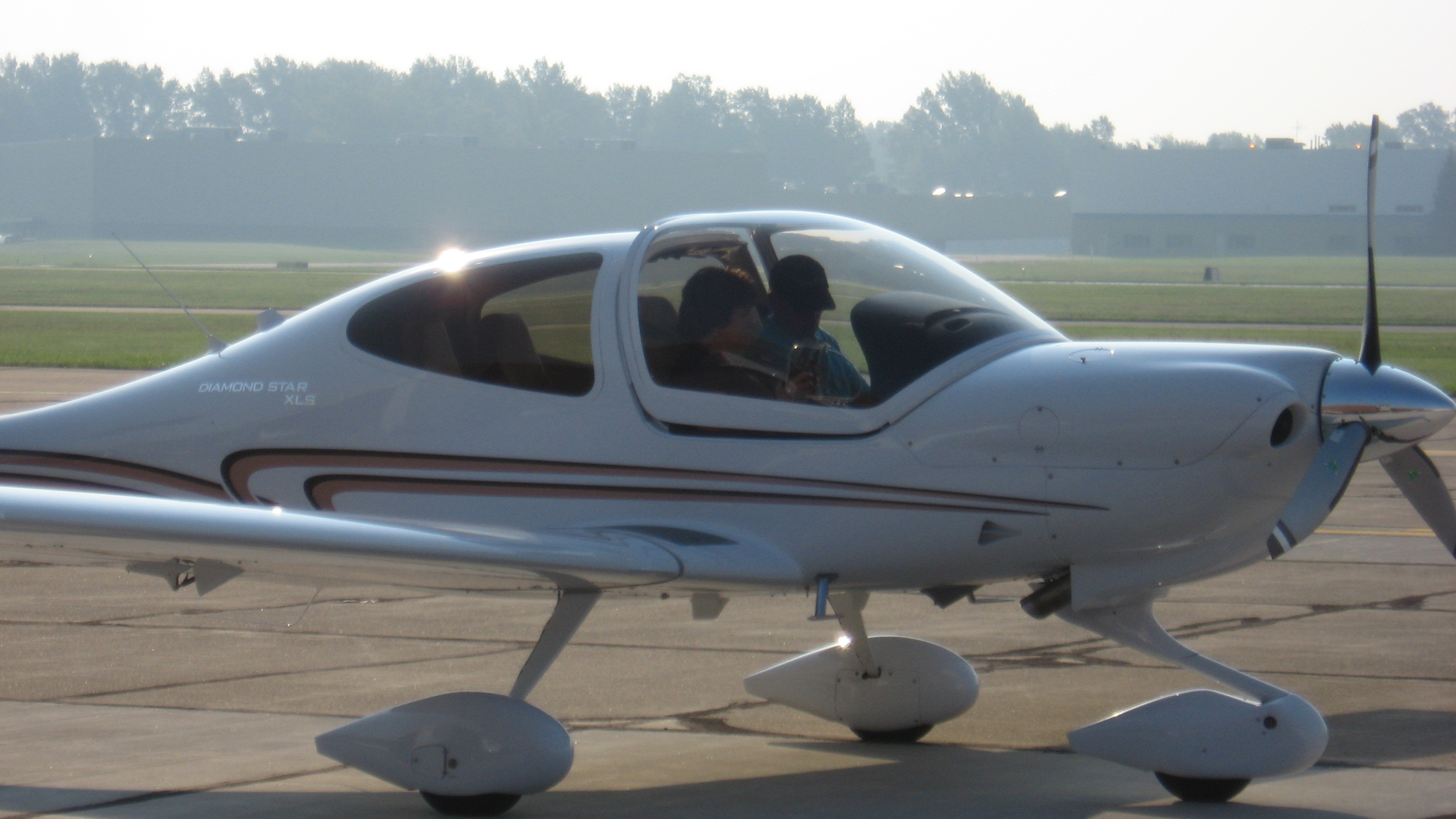
DA40 XLS preparing to taxi

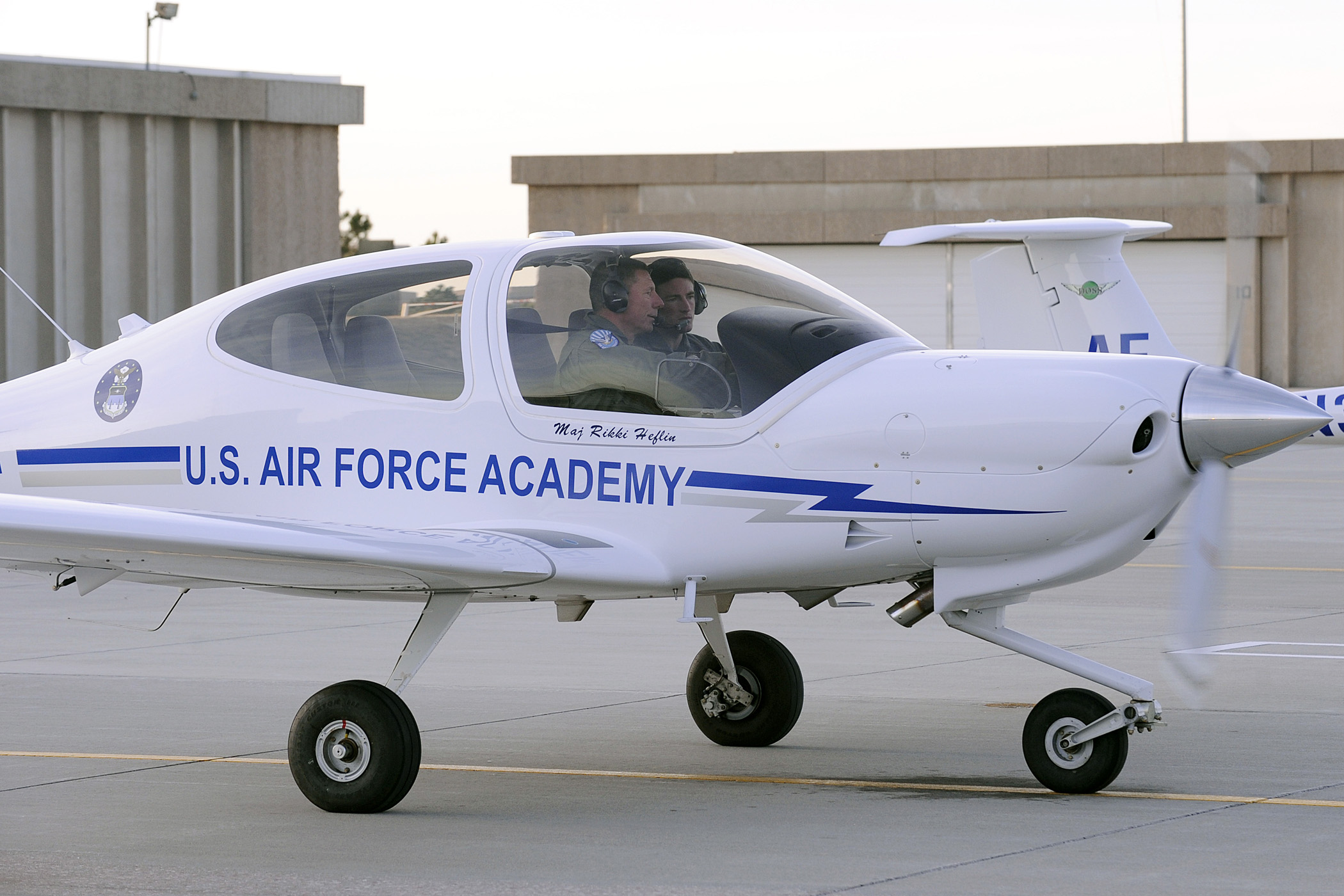
T-52A of the USAF Academy

DA40
Initial model, powered by a Textron Lycoming IO-360 M1A 180 hp (135 kW) engine and a MT Propellers MTV-12-B/180-17. Maximum gross weight is 1150 kg (2535 lb) or 1200 kg (2646 lb) with modifications installed. In increasingly refined versions marketed as the DA40-180, XL, CS and XLS.
DA40 D
Diesel model, powered by a Thielert TAE 125-01 (Centurion 1.7) or TAE 125-02-99 (Centurion 2.0) engine of 135 hp (101 kW) and MT Propellers MTV-6-A/187-129. Maximum gross weight is 1150 kg (2535 lb). Marketed primarily in Europe, although certified in Canada and Australia as well, as the DA40 TDI.
DA40 F
Fixed pitch propeller model, powered by Textron Lycoming O-360-A4M and a Sensenich 6EM8S10-0-63 or a MT-Propeller MT 188R135-4G propeller. Maximum gross weight is 1150 kg (2535 lb). Marketed as the DA40 FP. This model is no longer offered.
DA40 NG
Latest model, offered in select markets only (DA40 model is still offered in other markets), powered by an Austro Engine AE 300 165.6 hp (123.5 kW) running on JET A-1 fuel. EASA certified April 2010. By December 2020, 500 NG models had been produced.
T-52A
Military trainer version, 20 acquired in 2009 and used by the 557th Flying Training Squadron at United States Air Force Academy. The type was replaced in 2012 with the Cirrus SR20-based T-53A.
DA40 XLT
Version introduced in April 2013 with an upgraded interior, including sun-resistant deluxe leather seats, improved lumbar contours, sun visors, more cup holders and improved storage for hand-held devices.
DA40 Tundra Star
Version with strengthened landing gear, larger tires for operation from unimproved surfaces and a 168 hp (125 kW) Austro AE300 diesel engine that burns jet fuel.
eDA40
All-electric training variant, announced in October 2021, initially targeting a 2022 first flight and a 2023 certification, with 90 minute endurance. Charging can be accomplished in 20 minutes but certification could slip to early 2024, and the 90-minute endurance goal could be reached only as battery technology allows. The first flight actually occurred on 20 July 2023. The company expects it to be the first EASA/FAA Part 23 certified electric aircraft.
B.F.21
(Thai: บ.ฝ.๒๑) Royal Thai Armed Forces designation for the DA40 NG.

== Operators ==
=== Civil ===
The aircraft is popular with flying schools and is operated by private individuals and companies.

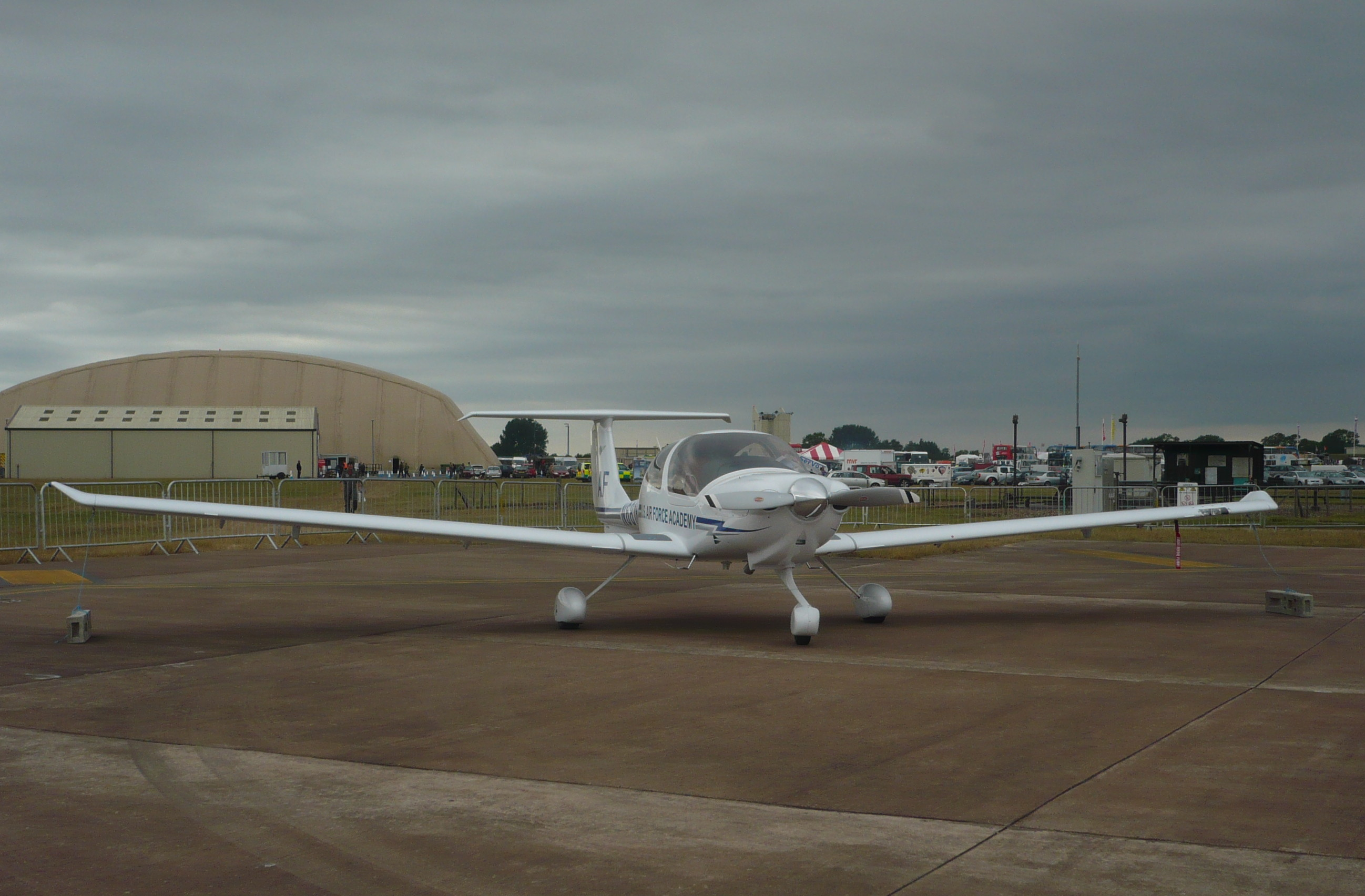
T-52A

At the December 2018 MEBAA show, OxfordSaudia Flight Academy by the Saudi Arabian National Company of Aviation-CAE Inc. in Dammam ordered 60 single-engine DA40 NG and twin-engine DA42-VI, to be delivered over five years, with Garmin G1000 NXi glass panels and diesel engines.

=== Military ===
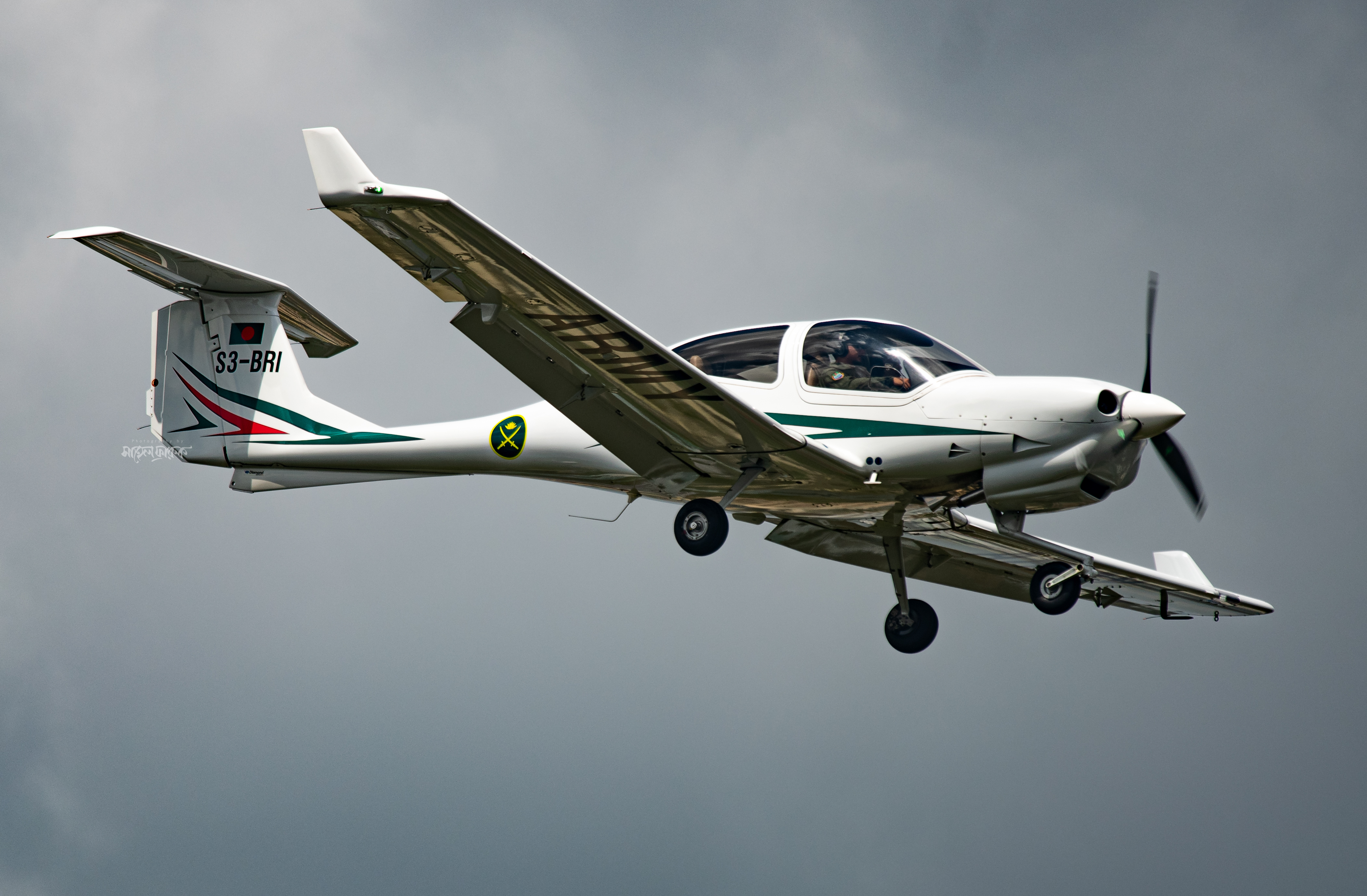
DA-40NG operated by Bangladesh Army Aviation Group for basic flight training

Australia

- Royal Australian Air Force – 8 leased from local firm for use with the Australian Air Force Cadets

Austria

- Austrian Air Force – 4 in service.

Bangladesh

- Bangladesh Army – 4 in service with 2 more on order.
  - Bangladesh Army Aviation Group

Bolivia

- Bolivian Air Force – 9 for basic flight training.

Ecuador

- Ecuadorian Air Force – 12
  - Academy "Cosme Rennella Barbatto"

Indonesia

- Indonesian National Police – 2

Jamaica

- Jamaica Defence Force Air Wing – 4 order.

Singapore

- Singapore Youth Flying Club – 13

United States

- United States Air Force Academy – 20

== Specifications (2007 model Diamond DA40 XL Diamond Star) ==
Data from Diamond Aircraft website

General characteristics

- Crew: one
- Capacity: three passengers
- Length: 8.1 m (26 ft 7 in)
- Wingspan: 11.9 m (39 ft 1 in)
- Height: 1.98 m (6 ft 6 in)
- Wing area: 13.5 m^{2} (145 sq ft)
- Airfoil: Wortmann FX 63-137
- Empty weight: 795 kg (1,753 lb)
- Gross weight: 1,198 kg (2,641 lb)
- Powerplant: 1 × Lycoming IO-360-M1A 4-cylinder air-cooled horizontally-opposed piston engine, 134 kW (180 hp)

Performance

- Cruise speed: 279 km/h (173 mph, 151 kn) TAS
- Stall speed: 91 km/h (57 mph, 49 kn) flaps down
- Range: 1,341 km (833 mi, 724 nmi)
- Service ceiling: 5,000 m (16,000 ft)
- Rate of climb: 5.69 m/s (1,120 ft/min)
- Power/mass: 0.110 kW/kg (0.067 hp/lb)

== See also ==
Related development

- Diamond DA20
- Diamond DA42 Twin Star
- Diamond DA62

Aircraft of comparable role, configuration, and era

- Cessna 182T Skylane
- Cirrus SR20
- Lancair Columbia
- Mooney M20
- Sling Aircraft Sling TSi
- Tecnam P2010
- Vans RV-10
