= Diamond DA42 Twin Star =

Four seat, twin engine, propeller-driven airplane

DA42 Twin Star
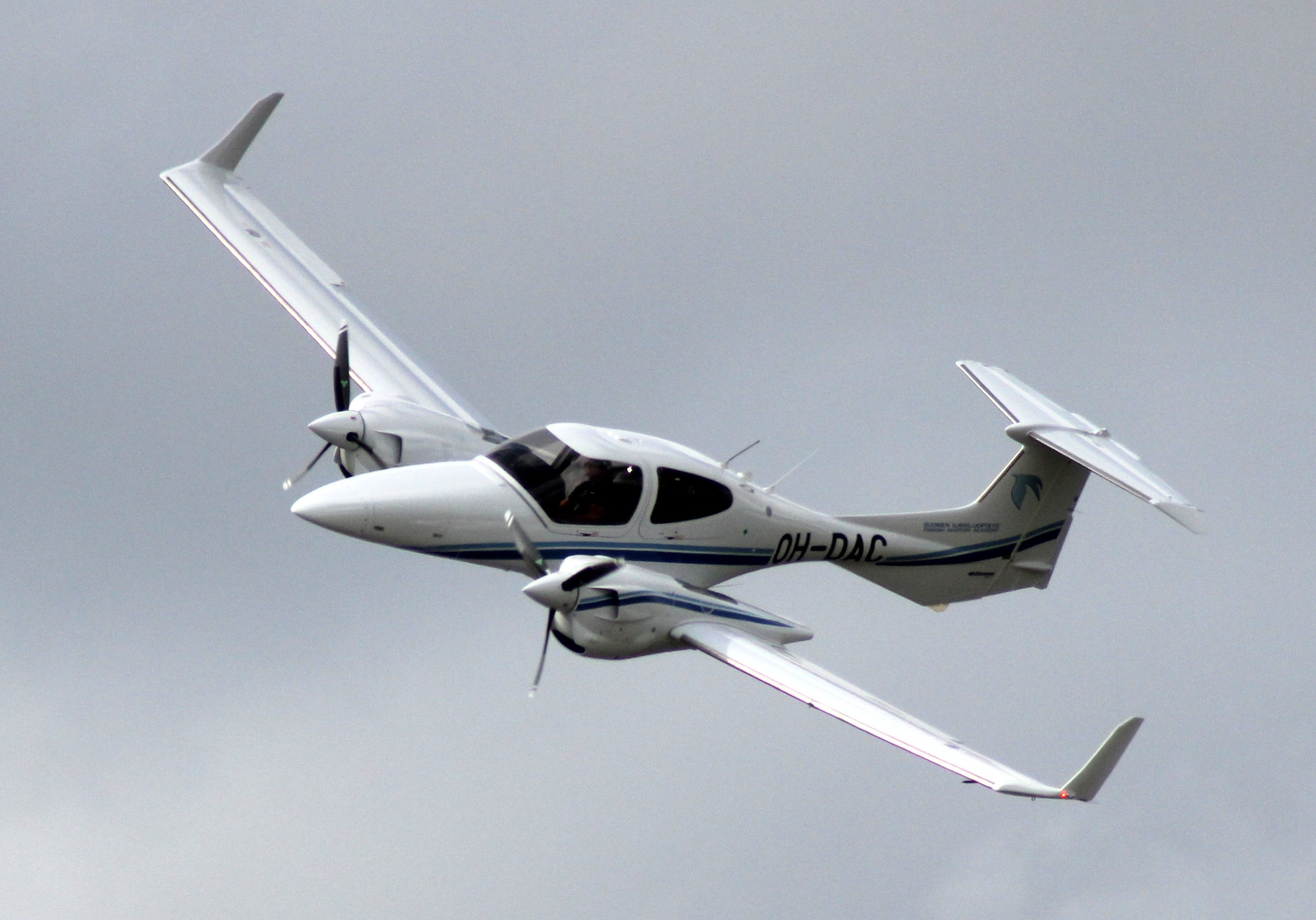

General information
- Type: Light twin-engined utility and trainer aircraft
- National origin: Austria
- Manufacturer: Diamond Aircraft Industries
- Status: In production
- Number built: 600+ (2010)

History
- Manufactured: 2002–present
- Introduction date: 2004
- First flight: 9 December 2002
- Variant: Aeronautics Defense Dominator

The Diamond DA42 Twin Star is a four seat, twin engine, propeller-driven airplane developed and manufactured in Austria and Canada by Diamond Aircraft Industries, an Austrian subsidiary of China-based Wanfeng Aviation since 2017. It was Diamond's first twin engine design, as well as the first new European twin-engine aircraft in its category to be developed in over 25 years. In 2004, the DA42 became the first diesel-powered fixed-wing aircraft to perform a non-stop crossing of the North Atlantic.

By 2012, the DA42 had become a key revenue generator for the company, having gained popularity with government and military operators in addition to the civil market that had suffered as a result of the Great Recession. Government customers have typically employed the type in the aerial surveillance role, which contributed towards the development of the Aeronautics Defense Dominator, a medium-altitude long-endurance (MALE) unmanned aerial vehicle (UAV), which had been derived from the DA42.

== Development ==
=== Origins ===
Since its founding in the 1980s, Austrian manufacturer Diamond Aircraft Industries had concentrated on building an extensive product line. During the late 1990s, company founder and chief executive officer Christian Dries approached the design team with a concept for a twin-engined aircraft, which became the company's first multi-engined aircraft, and became the next step beyond the Diamond DA40. This concept emphasised several key qualities, including the need for the aircraft to be simple to operate and fuel-efficient, while providing a luxurious four-seat passenger compartment akin to modern automobiles. The concept was not popular at the time; Aerospace publication Flying Magazine referred to Diamond's choice to develop a twin-engined aircraft for general aviation use as "the emergence of an all-new light-piston twin in this class something of a surprise."

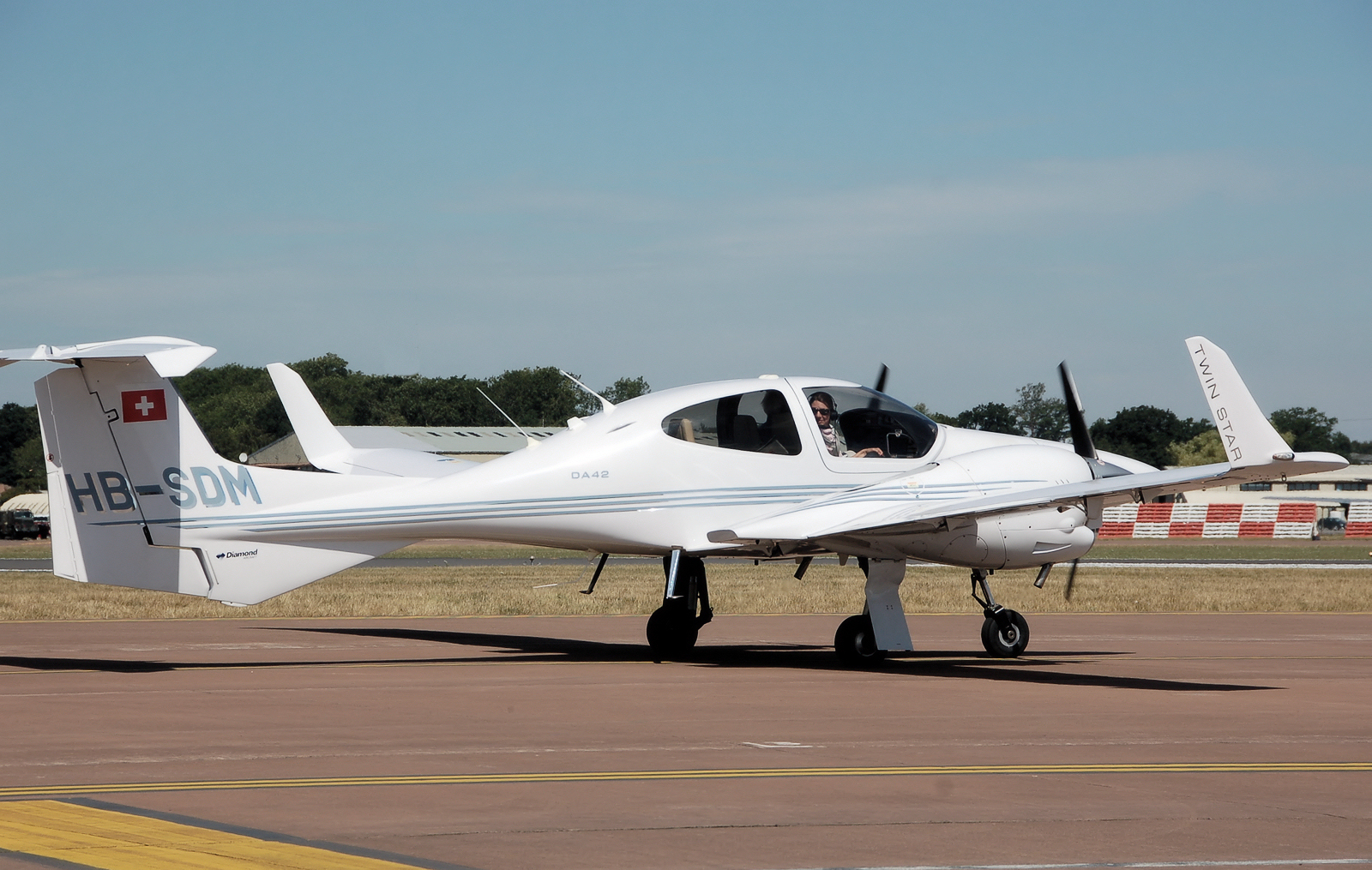
The DA42 Twin Star

During April 2004, the DA42 Twin Star received certification from the European Aviation Safety Agency (EASA) under the latter's newly-introduced Part procedures. In July 2005, the aircraft was awarded certification from the Federal Aviation Administration (FAA) in the US. It has been certified to fly under both visual flight rules (VFR) and instrument flight rules (IFR), allowing it to be operated under a wide range of conditions. At the time of its introduction to service, aerospace publication Flight International observed that "The DA42 has no natural competitors in its class and sets a benchmark for European general aviation".

During August 2004, the DA42 Twin Star piloted by Gérard Guillaumaud became the first diesel-powered fixed-wing aircraft to perform a non-stop crossing of the North Atlantic, taking 12.5 hours while operating with an average fuel consumption of 21.73 litres (4.78 imp gal; 5.74 US gal) per hour (10.86 litres (2.39 imp gal; 2.87 US gal) per hour per engine). In June 2010, a DA42 powered by Austro AE300 engines became the first aircraft to be publicly flown on algae-derived jet fuel.

=== Further development ===
As a consequence of the insolvency of engine manufacturer Thielert and decisions of the insolvency administrator, including cancelling warranty support and the prorating of time-between-overhaul for the Thielert engines that power the DA42, in July 2008, Diamond announced that production of the DA42 had been suspended. At the time production was suspended the DA42 was reported to hold around 80% of the piston twin market.

In March 2009, Diamond achieved EASA certification for the Austro Engine AE 300, which enabled the DA42 to resume production. Equipped with the Austro engine, these aircraft were designated and marketed as the DA42 NG. In April 2009, the first Austro-powered DA42 NG was delivered to a customer in Sweden. On 9 April 2010, the DA42 NG received FAA certification, clearing the way for sales to resume to North American customers.

By March 2012, the DA42 had become the major income driver at Diamond Aircraft. Company CEO Christian Dries indicated that the market focus of the company had been changed by the Great Recession of 2008–2010 which had led the company to transition to derive two-thirds of its revenue from military and government contracts, primarily for manned and unmanned surveillance aircraft, the latter in the form of the Aeronautics Defense Dominator.

Also in March 2012, Diamond aircraft announced they were developing a fly-by-wire version of the DA42, which had the stated aim of reducing the accident rate in light aircraft. The system is expected to include flight envelope protection, turbulence righting, autoland capabilities, and damage-tolerant by-pass capabilities, the latter of which would allow for effective flight while suffering from jammed or otherwise non-functional flight surfaces. The autonomous DA42 was flown and landed without ground support in 2015.

In July 2018, the Rossiyskaya Gazeta announced a UAV version, DA-42B, armed with the 9M120 Ataka antitank missile.

== Design ==
=== Overview ===
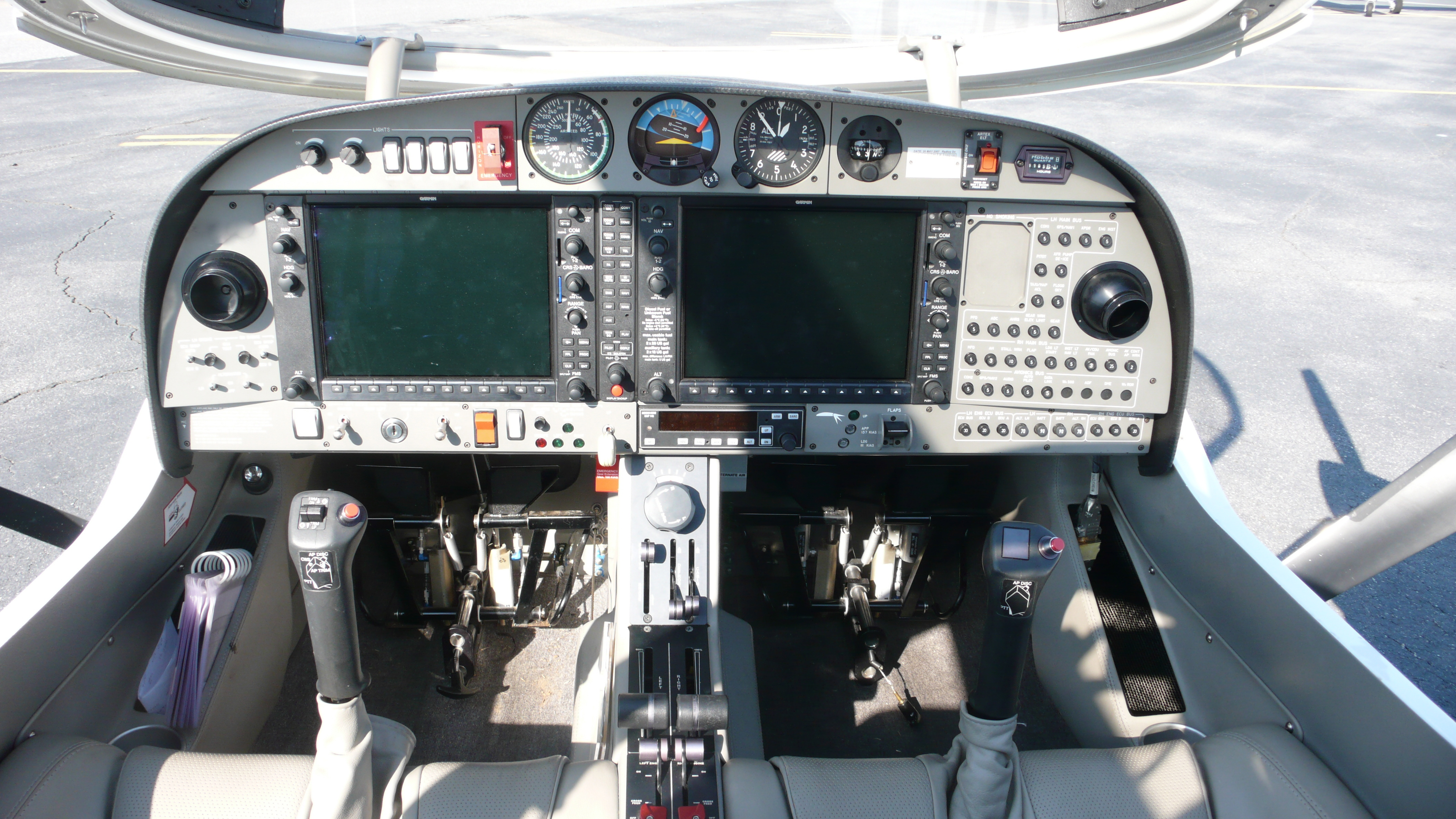
Instrument panel of a DA42 Twin Star, note the installed Garmin G1000 glass cockpit present

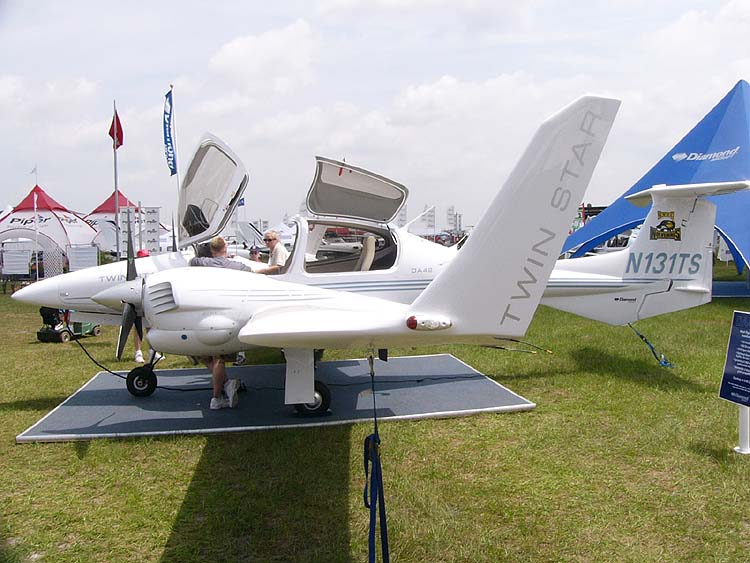
A DA42 on static display; note the prominent winglets

The Diamond DA42 Twin Star is a twin-engined low-wing cantilever monoplane, commonly used as a general aviation aircraft for touring and training purposes. It is equipped with a retractable tricycle landing gear arrangement and uses a T-tail. The DA42 incorporates a combination of advanced features within the company's first twin-engine design. The airframe is composed of composite materials, making extensive use of carbon fiber reinforced polymers throughout its structure; this construction provides the aircraft with a suitable passive safety level to conform with the established European Aviation Safety Agency (EASA) Part 21 rules, as well as relatively efficient aerodynamics and essentially unlimited airframe life. The carbon-fiber main wing spars possesses exceptional crashworthiness.

The DA42 typically accommodates four people in two rows of seating. All of the seats have been designed for crashworthiness and are complete with automotive-style three-point seat belts; while the seats themselves are fixed in position, the position of the rudder-pedals is adjustable. The front pair of seats are accessed via a front-hinged canopy while a top-hinged door located on the left side provides access to the rear seats. The pilots are housed under a sizable canopy which provides generous external visibility, save for the use of a large fixed sunscreen. Additionally, separate baggage compartments, which are accessible via external hatches, are contained within internal space in the aircraft's nose.

Both the avionics and principal flight controls of the DA42 have been designed to be user-friendly and to reduce pilot workload. A Garmin G1000 glass cockpit serves as the centrepiece of the aircraft's integrated digital avionics, using a pair of large flat-panel monitors in place of conventional instrumentation and gauges; immediately above these monitors is a horizontal row of standby instruments present as a fail-safe. The monitors display various information on the aircraft, along with navigational data and flight information; both screens can show identical basic information or be configured to flight data on the left monitor and navigation on the right. According to Flight International, the displays are easy to read while features such as the moving map display were considered to be "useful". The DA42 is also outfitted with a sophisticated three-axis Garmin-built GFC 700 autopilot and GWX 70 weather radar.

=== Performance ===
The flight performance of the DA42 is largely favourable, having been designed to incorporate not only high levels of performance but the greatest possible degrees of passive safety in operation, alongside excellent fuel economy and assisted by the implementation of various modern technologies. The flight controls themselves are proportionally responsive for performing even small manoeuvers and light motions. Both pilots are equipped with their own fighter-style central sticks, which are attached to an otherwise unobstructed cockpit floor. In a similar manner, a single combined power lever is used to regulate both the engine and propeller settings; the power levers are convenient and can be operated in a relatively easy manner. In comparison with other twin-engined aircraft in its category, the centre console of the DA42 is uncluttered, which is a result of the clean design of the controls.

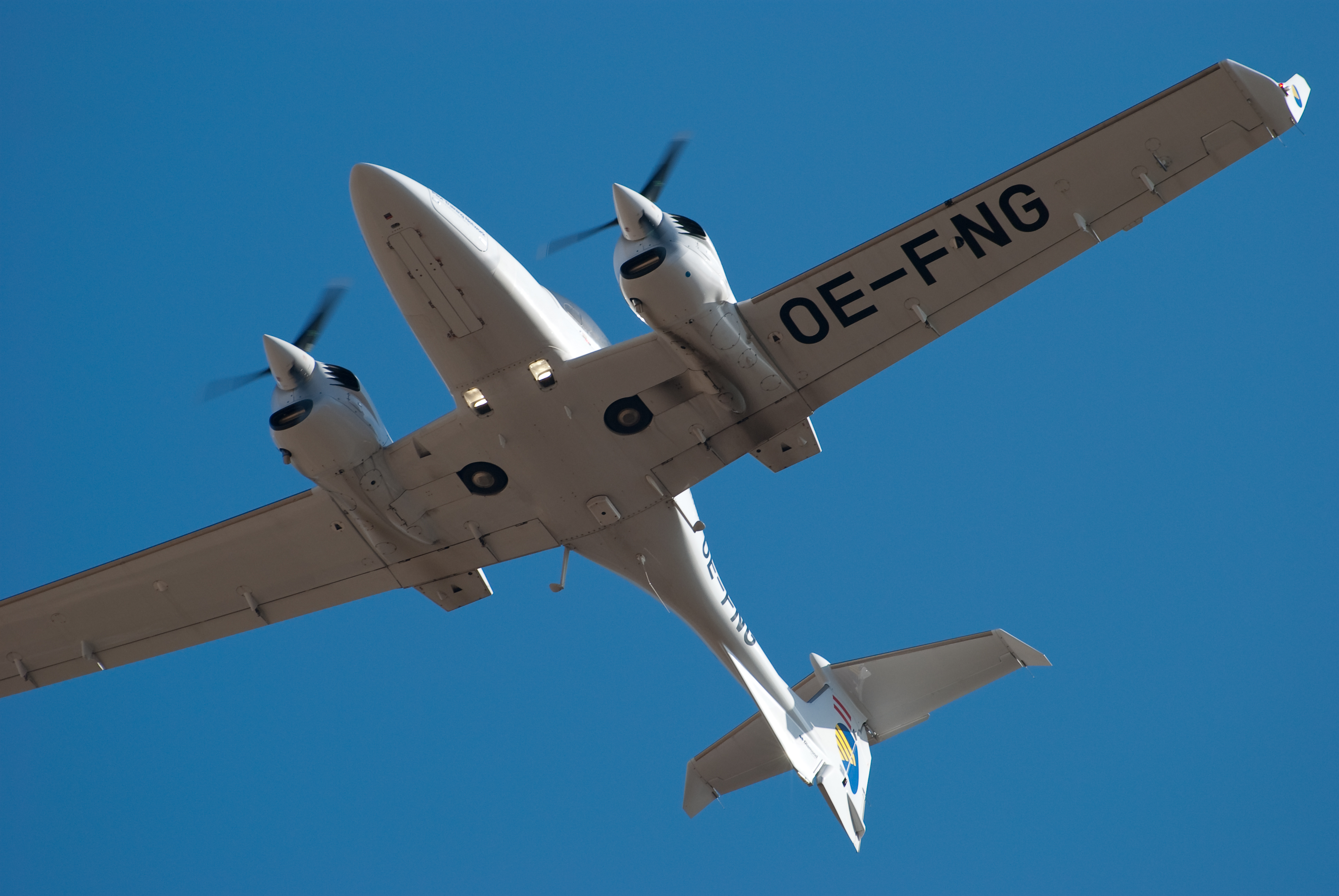
Underside of a DA42 passing overhead

The stall characteristics are also relatively benign, being described by Flight International as "probably the most docile of any aircraft I can remember". On the DA42, stall conditions are forewarned by the sounding of a warning horn at 5 to 7 kn (9 to 13 km/h) above stall, as well as by elevating levels of airframe buffeting and a 5–10° drop of the nose. The aircraft is relatively difficult to stall outside of substantial mishandling or deliberate intention. Both longitudinal and lateral stability can be maintained with a relatively low level of effort, not necessitating continuous trimming while the aircraft is accelerating. Active use of the rudder is necessary for effective turns and counteracting sideslip tendencies.

While the DA42 is a twin-engined aircraft, this is predominantly a measure for safety. It is readily capable of sustained flight using only a single engine. DA42 NG climbs at up to 270 ft/min at sea level in standard conditions on a single engine, with performance degrading with higher altitudes and temperatures. The DA42 possesses considerable endurance, being capable of performing 13 hour-long flights without carrying additional fuel tanks; this is partially due to its high fuel efficiency of its Austro engines, which consume 13.6 US gallons per hour when operated at 75 per cent power, lower than some of its single-engined rivals. The digital FADEC (full authority digital engine controls) serves to lower operational difficulty, constantly performing tasks such as managing rpm and fault-checking. The propellers are clockwise-rotating as viewed by the pilot, so the left engine is the critical engine.

=== Powerplants ===
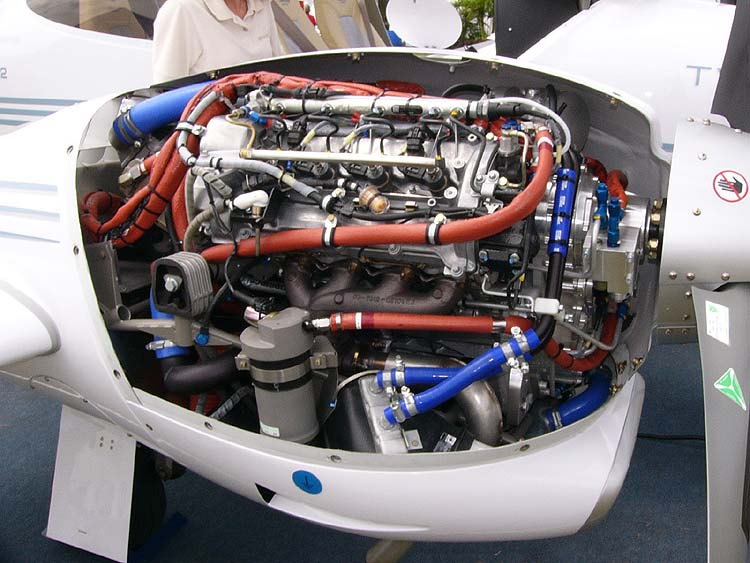
Diamond DA42 Twin Star Thielert Centurion 1.7 diesel engine

The original model of the DA42 was powered by a pair of Thielert Aircraft Engines-built TAE 125-01 Centurion 1.7 engines. However, Thielert ended its production of the 1.7 litre Centurion engines in favour of a new 2.0 litre engine, marketed as the TAE 125-02-99; as a result of the engine production change, Diamond began installing the TAE 125-02-99 engine during early 2007. Although engine displacement had increased, it was deliberately de-rated in order to produce the same power 101 kW (135 hp) and torque 409 N⋅m (302 lbf⋅ft) as the earlier 1.7 L. engine.

In late 2007, Diamond announced it would begin building and installing its own aerodiesels, through a subsidiary, Austro Engine GmbH, in collaboration with other partners that included Mercedes-Benz. The continued use of Thielert engines on the DA42 was also brought into question following Thielert filing for insolvency in April 2008. In March 2009, Diamond achieved EASA certification for the rival Austro Engine AE 300 powerplant.

The DA42NG "New Generation" is powered by Diamond's third generation Austro AE 300 turbo diesel engine. The Lycoming IO-360 engine is also available as an option. The 125 kW (168 hp) AE 300 engine replaces the earlier Thielert Centurion 1.7 and 2.0 engines and is known for its good fuel efficiency, using 12.1 litres (2.7 imp gal; 3.2 US gal) per hour while loitering at maximum endurance or 30 litres (7 imp gal; 8 US gal) per hour at maximum continuous power (92%). It is also available with optional "on top" exhaust mufflers that reduce noise levels to below 59 decibels at a height of 500 feet (150 m). The Austro engine produces 20% more power than the previous Thielert engines and also results in a higher gross weight and increased performance. Diamond has claimed that the Austro engine is about 46% more fuel efficient than its gasoline rivals. It runs on diesel fuel or jet fuel, both of which are typically cheaper than aviation gasoline.

== Operational history ==
A DA42 configured to perform aerial survey missions

Upon its introduction, Diamond had to combat a historic trend of declining light-piston twin sales in the face of increasingly reliable and capable single-engined aircraft for general aviation; the DA42 had only five competing aircraft in its category.

=== DA42 MPP ===
The DA42, particularly its use in the surveillance sector, became Diamond's most important business. A dedicated surveillance model of the aircraft, designated as the DA 42 MPP, was developed; during 2008, Diamond delivered 17 DA 42 MPPs and anticipated a demand for between 50 and 60 such aircraft per year. During the latter part of 2008 and early 2009, a pair of Royal Air Force DA42 MPPs were deployed for eight months to provide combat support to coalition forces operating in Iraq; during the deployment, these aircraft flew a combined 2,000h in the surveillance role, for which it had been outfitted with Cineflex high-definition cameras, Riegl laser scanners and Scotty satellite communications kit.

== Variants ==
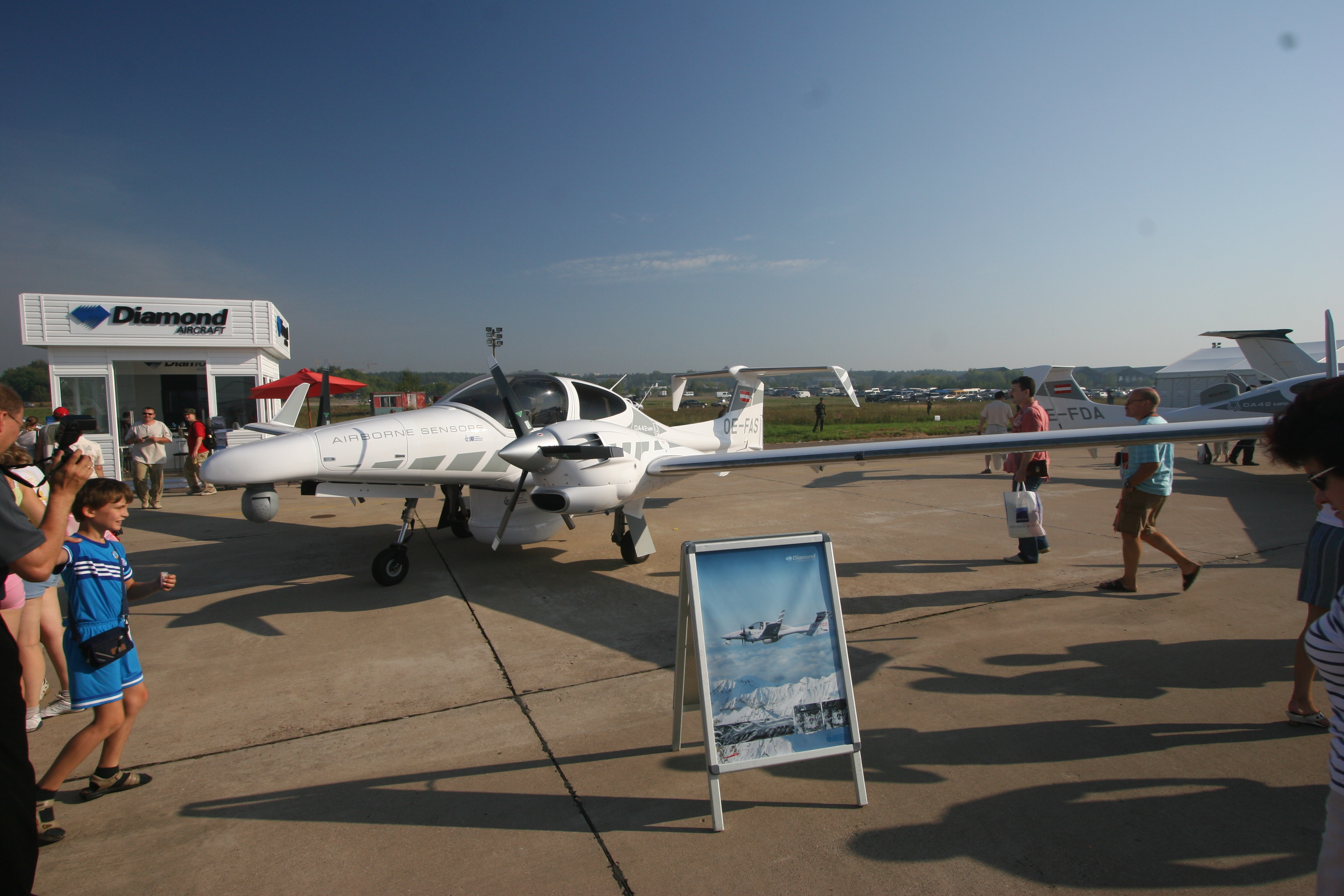
A DA42 at the MAKS Airshow in Moscow, 2007

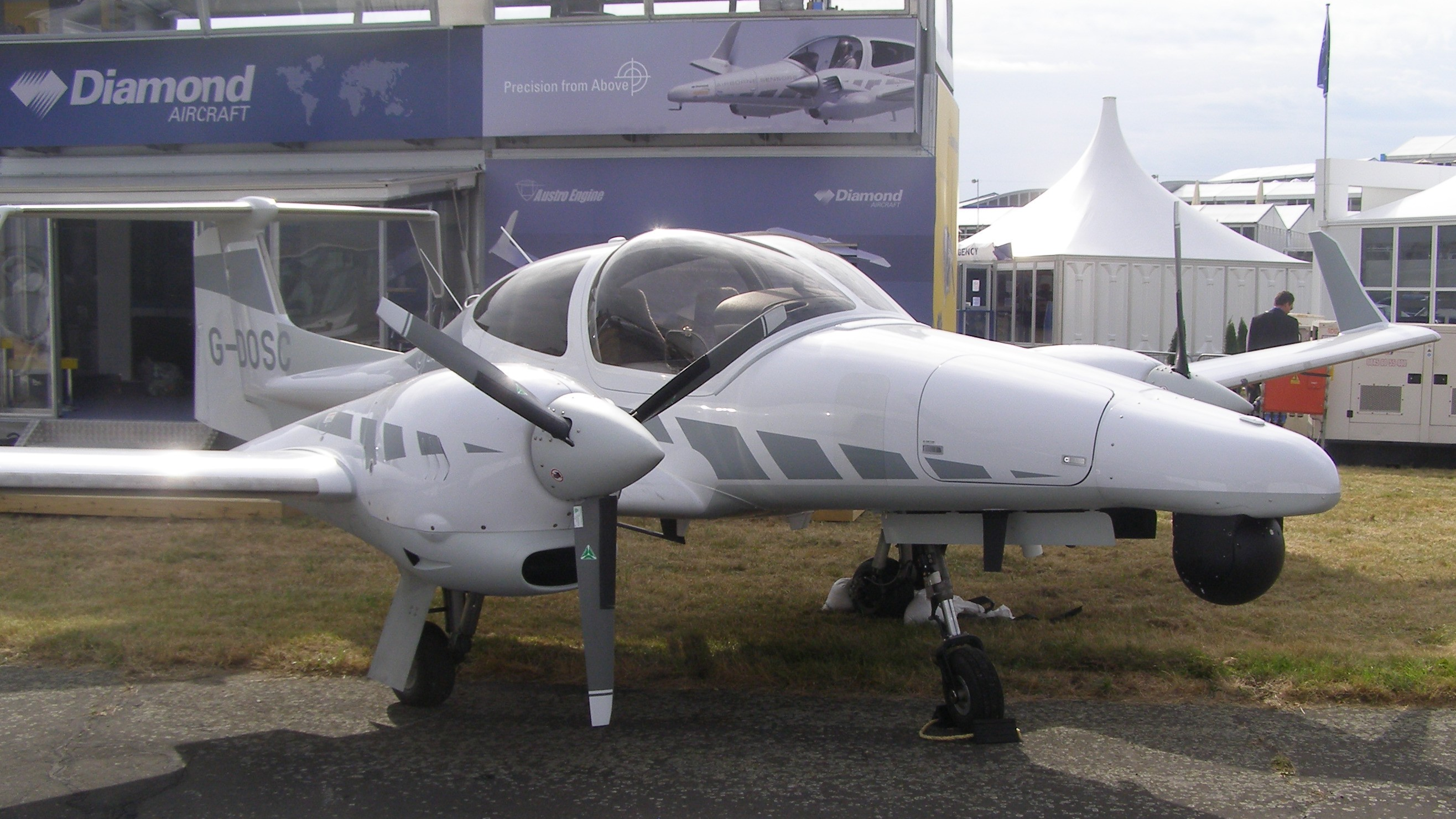
A DA-42 MPP at the 2010 Farnborough Airshow

DA42
Production aircraft built in Austria and Canada
DA42 M
Special Mission variant built in Austria and China, modification from standard DA42 and new production.
DA42 L360
Lycoming IO-360 134 kW (180 hp) equipped version using 100LL fuel instead of Jet-A1. This model is intended for the North American flight training market.
DA42 NG
Austro Engine AE 300 127 kW (170 hp) equipped version. EASA certified March 2009; FAA certified April 2010; Transport Canada certified 16 April 2012. Production aircraft have been built in Austria, Canada, China and Russia.
DA42 M-NG
Special Mission variant of the NG.
DA42T
Special training version of the DA42 NG, developed for Russia in 2010-2011.
DA42 MPP
Diamond Airborne Sensing a wholly owned subsidiary of Diamond produces the MPP or "Multi Purpose Platform" variant which is modified to carry aerial sensing, mapping and surveillance payloads. The UK Ministry of Defence specified the DA42 MPP variant for its surveillance systems project, converted by DO Systems. Two ordered in June 2008.
DA42 MPP Centaur OPA
Aurora Flight Sciences developed an Optionally Piloted Aircraft (OPA) as an Intelligence, Surveillance and Reconnaissance (ISR) platform and can be operated as either unmanned or with pilots on board. One in service with the Swiss military procurement agency Armasuisse.
Dominator II
Aeronautics Defense Systems Ltd developed an UAV version of the DA42, designated as the Aeronautics Defense Dominator and first flown in July 2009. Has an endurance of 28 hours with a 408 kg (899 lb) payload and speed of 140–354 km/h (75–190 knots) to a maximum altitude of 9,144 m (30,000 ft).
DA42-VI
Improved DA42 introduced in March 2012 with new propeller and aerodynamic clean-ups to the rudder and engine cowling, resulting in greatly increased cruise speed performance.
B.F.20
(Thai: บ.ฝ.๒๐) Royal Thai Armed Forces designation for the DA42.
B.TF.20
(Thai: บ.ตฝ.๒๐) Royal Thai Armed Forces designation for the DA42 MPP.

== Operators ==
=== Civil operators ===
The DA42 is mainly operated by flight training schools, aerial surveillance and mapping operators. A major operator is Lufthansa Aviation Training with 14 DA42s in service or on order, and Embry-Riddle Aeronautical University with 31 (23 at the Daytona Beach campus and 8 at the Prescott Campus). Air India ordered three DA42 NG for its Flying Training Organization in December 2024. The first two were delivered on 12 December 2025.

=== Military operators ===
Argentina

- Argentine Army – 3 DA42M surveillance aircraft.

Ghana

- Ghana Air Force – 2 DA42M surveillance aircraft and 1 DA42 training aircraft

Jamaica

- Jamaica Defence Force

Niger

- Niger Air Force – 2 DA42M surveillance aircraft

Poland

- Polish Air Force – 5 DA42

Russia

- Federal Security Service (FSB) – 2 DA42M-NGs fitted with reconnaissance equipment ordered in May 2016 for delivery by November 2017.
- Ministry of Defence – 35 DA42Ts on order. First 3 aircraft delivered in 2017. Unknown number delivered in 2018. 20 more ordered in August 2020.

Rwanda

Eritrean airforce 4 DA42 Ts used for training craft

- Rwandan Air Force - 2 x DA42 used for transport.

Switzerland

- Swiss military procurement agency Armasuisse – 1 delivered at end of 2012

Thailand

- Royal Thai Air Force – 6 ordered for delivery in mid-2009.

Turkmenistan

- Turkmen Air Force – 5 DA42MPP Guardian

Ukraine

- Border Guard Service operates three DA42 planes for border patrol missions. One aircraft was lost and its crew killed in a 2012 accident in Zakarpattia.

United Kingdom

- Royal Air Force – 2 x DA42MPP operated in 2008 and 2009 in surveillance role.

Venezuela

- Bolivarian Military Aviation - 6 DA42 used for training

== Aircraft on display ==
- Technisches Museum Wien – prototype DA42

== Specifications (DA42 Twin Star) ==
Data from Type Certificate Data Sheet, Flying Magazine, manufacturer

General characteristics

- Crew: 1 pilot
- Capacity: 3 passengers
- Length: 8.56 m (28 ft 1 in)
- Wingspan: 13.55 m (44 ft 5 in)
- Height: 2.49 m (8 ft 2 in)
- Wing area: 16.29 m^{2} (175.3 sq ft)
- Empty weight: 1,420 kg (3,131 lb)
- Gross weight: 1,999 kg (4,407 lb)
- Fuel capacity: 289 litres (64 imp gal; 76 US gal)
- Powerplant: 2 × Austro Engine E4 turbocharged diesel engine, 125 kW (168 hp) each

Performance

- Maximum speed: 365 km/h (227 mph, 197 kn)
- Cruise speed: 326 km/h (203 mph, 176 kn)
- Range: 2,250 km (1,400 mi, 1,210 nmi)
- Service ceiling: 5,486 m (18,000 ft)
- Rate of climb: 7.9 m/s (1,280 ft/min)

== See also ==
Aircraft of comparable role, configuration, and era

- Aeronautics Defense Dominator
- Beechcraft Duchess
- Piper PA-44 Seminole
