= Aeronautics Defense Orbiter =

Reconnaissance UAV

Orbiter
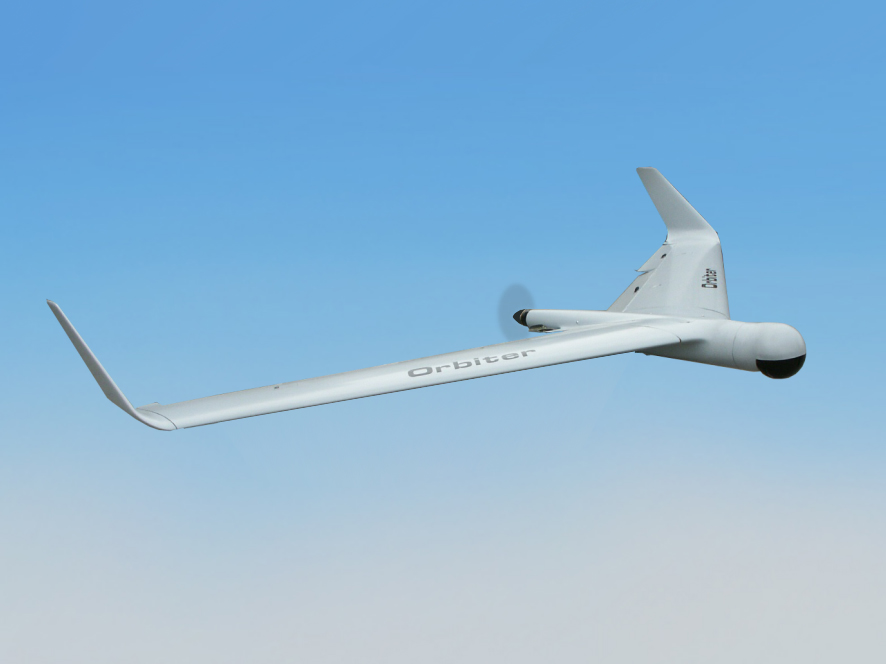
- The Aeronautics Orbiter UAV in flight

General information
- Type: Reconnaissance UAV
- National origin: Israel
- Manufacturer: Aeronautics Defense Systems

The Orbiter Mini UAV System is an Israeli compact and lightweight unmanned aerial vehicle designed for use in military and security applications. It has been used in the Middle East since it was first developed. The system is used for 'Over The Hill' reconnaissance missions, low intensity conflicts and urban warfare operations as well as any close range ISTAR mission. It is manufactured by the Israeli company Aeronautics Defense Systems.

Aeronautics announced in May 2015 the Orbiter 1K "Kingfisher" version with a fuselage adapted to carry a 2 kg (4.4 lb) explosive payload, turning it into a loitering munition. It can be controlled by an operator, or is capable of being given a waypoint and independently scanning the area to detect and destroy a stationary or moving target. If a target is not detected, the Orbiter 1K can return to base and land for reuse. The Orbiter 1K can fly for 2–3 hours carrying an electro-optical/infrared sensor with a unique warhead that, due to its low acoustic signature, "is not detected until two seconds before it starts its kill dive". Aeronautics announced the armed loitering UAV achieved operational status in August 2016.

== Accidents and incidents ==
According to news reports, an Orbiter Mini UAV, operated by the Mexican Federal Government, likely the Federal Police, malfunctioned on December 17, 2010. During a surveillance operation, it crossed the border into US airspace and crashed in El Paso, Texas. No property was damaged, as the UAV apparently deployed a parachute during its descent. It was reported to and retrieved by U.S. Customs and Border Protection.

== Operational history ==
The Orbiter 1k was employed by the Azerbaijani Armed Forces during the 2020 Nagorno-Karabakh conflict. In 2017, Israeli company Aeronautics Limited was hit with fraud charges and violation of Israel's export control laws. Israeli members of the company were found to have "demonstrated" their suicide drone with an actual strike on Armenians in the region. Critics maintained that Israeli supplying regimes cheap drones like these were fueling the conflict in Armenia and Azerbaijan.

Iranian media claimed that Iranian military intercepted an Orbiter surveillance drone in its Hormozgan province during the 2026 Iran war. Israel said that it was unaware of any such incident.

On 15 Novmbber 2026, the regular Iranian air defence force reported shooting down an Orbiter 4 drone over Nahavand.

== See also ==
=== Aircraft of comparable role, configuration, and era ===
- Orlan-10

== Operators ==
- Azerbaijan - Azerbaijani Land Forces - Orbiter-3 - has a local plant for manufacturing
- Croatia - Croatian Army - The latest variant Orbiter 3b - 6
- Finland - Finnish Army - two sets delivered - Orbiter-2B
- Greece - Hellenic Army - "Large numbers" were procured in April 2023 for use with the SPIKE-NLOS systems
- Indonesia - Paskhas - Orbiter-2B
- Ireland - Irish Army - Orbiter-2B
- Israel - Israeli Sea Corps
- Mexico - Mexican Federal Police PEMEX - Orbiter-2B
- Peru - Peruvian Army
- Poland - Polish Land Forces and Polish Special Forces - 11 sets delivered - Orbiter-2B
- Serbia - Serbian Army - 10 sets
- Singapore - Republic of Singapore Air Force - Orbiter-4
- South Africa - South African National Defence Force
- Spain - Ministry of Defence - Orbiter-3.
- Thailand - Royal Thai Navy
- Turkmenistan - Orbiter 2B
- United States - Orbiter-4
- United Kingdom - 3 on order
- Ukraine - Witnessed in the Ukrainian skies on November 17, 2022
- Vietnam
  - Vietnam People's Ground Force - Orbiter 2 - Orbiter 3
  - Vietnam People's Navy - Orbiter 2
