= Shandong Bin Ao Aircraft Industries =

Chinese aircraft manufacturer

- Industry: Aircraft Manufacturer
- Founded: 2008
- Headquarters: China
- Total assets: $42,000,000

Shandong Bin Ao Aircraft Industries Co., Ltd. (Chinese: 山东滨奥飞机制造有限公司) is located in the Dagao Town, Zhanhua County, Binzhou City, Shandong province, China.

== History ==
The company was founded in 2008. It is a joint venture with a total investment amount of US$42,000,000 from Diamond Aircraft Industries GmbH, Binzhou Dagao General Aviation City Co., Ltd., Sociedade de Investimento e Fomento Predial Long Win Linitada and Binzhou Ding Yi Investment Management Co., Ltd.

On 26 November 2006, the joint venture was issued a Part 21G Production Approval to release airworthy new components by EASA; This approval was subsequently revoked by EASA on 28 October 2019, removing the organisation's ability to certify components as airworthy.

There are almost 100 technicians coming from every part of the country, including seven persons with high title, 11 persons with master's degree and 63 persons with bachelor's degree, in the company now. Most technicians and workers will be sent to Austria for technical training. At present, 23 engineering technicians are under a 4-month training program in the Austria.

The factory building is designed by Binzhou Planning and Design Institute and China Space Civil & Building Engineering Design & Research Institute. The total construction area is 28,700 m^{2}. It can be divided into four zones by function as follows: zone A is Composite Production Area, zone B is Painting Area, zone C is Assembly Area, and zone D is for inspection, exhibition and sales.

The joint venture manufactures mainly DA40 Diamond Aircraft with a yearly production scale of 500 aircraft. DA40 Aircraft is made of composite material, and can be used for a very long time; its fuel consumption is low (27 liter per 100 km); its take-off distance is short (it can take off after taxiing for about 360 meters); it provides high safety performance with wider side surfaces of the wing, and it has good gliding performance, too.
