= Austro Engine E4 =

Four-cylinder, four-stroke, aircraft diesel engine

Austro Engine E4 (AE 300)
- Type: Four-cylinder four-stroke aircraft engine
- National origin: Austria
- Manufacturer: Austro Engine
- First run: 2008
- Major applications: Diamond DA42
- Number built: > 1,500

The Austro Engine E4 (marketed as the AE 300) is a liquid-cooled, inline, four-cylinder, four-stroke, aircraft diesel engine. The engine is manufactured by Austro Engine, an Austrian-based company and subsidiary of Diamond Aircraft Industries.

== Development ==
The engine is based on the Mercedes-Benz OM640 road Diesel engine.

Following Diamond's "General Aviation Single Point of Contact" strategy, Austro Engine started to design a new engine for use on Diamond products in 2005. It received its type certificate in January 2009.

== Applications ==
- Diamond DA40
- Diamond DA42
- Diamond DA50
- Diamond DA52
- Diamond DA62 180hp AE330.

== Specifications (E4) ==
Data from Austro Engine and type certificate

=== General characteristics ===
- Type: Four-cylinder, four-stroke diesel aircraft engine
- Bore: 83 mm (3.3 in)
- Stroke: 92 mm (3.6 in)
- Displacement: 1,991 cm^{3} (121 cu in)
- Length: 738 mm (29 in)
- Width: 855 mm (34 in)
- Height: 574 mm (23 in)
- Dry weight: 186 kg (410 lb)
- Mean time between failures: > 100,000 h
- Time between overhauls: 1,800 h

=== Components ===
- Fuel type: Kerosene and diesel (EN 590)
- Cooling system: liquid-cooled
- Reduction gear: Gearbox with 1:1.69 ratio

=== Performance ===
- Power output: 168 hp (125 kW) (maximum takeoff and continuous power) at up to 2,300 propeller RPM
- Specific power: 1.38 hp/cu in (62.80 kW/L)
- Fuel consumption: 35 L/h (9.25 US gal/h) at 100% power, and

19 L/h (5.02 US gal/h) at 60% power

- Power-to-weight ratio: 0.41 hp/lb (0.67 kW/kg)
- Torque: 512 Nm (maximum)
