= RT Aerostats Systems =

Israeli aircraft manufacturer

RT
- Type: Privately held company
- Industry: Aerospace
- Founded: 1996
- Founder: Rami Shmueli
- Headquarters: Yavne, Israel
- Key people: CEO: Rami Shmueli
- Products: Aerostats
- Owner: Shmueli and Luidan Group
- Website: www.rt.co.il

RT Aerostats Systems is an Israeli company that designs and manufactures the SkyStar family of aerostats, for use in intelligence, surveillance, reconnaissance and communications applications.

The company was established by former military intelligence and current CEO Rami Shmueli, and is currently owned in equal parts by Shmueli and the Aeronautics Group. The company headquarters and production lines are based in Yavne, Israel, while the company also has offices in Texas.

== History ==
The company was established in 1996 by Rami Shmueli, as a company for the production of technology aerostats and balloon advertising . In 1996, the first aerostat for use in surveillance and monitoring applications was developed for the 'Shachal' Company.

In 2004, the company developed a family of SkyStar aerostats for use in intelligence, surveillance, reconnaissance, and communications applications. SkyStar systems are operational worldwide in various military and civilian missions. In 2008, the UAV Aeronautics Group purchased part of RT's shares.

The systems are currently deployed in more than 10 different countries around the world, including Israel, Canada, United States, Russia, Afghanistan, Mexico, Chile, Argentina, Thailand, Colombia and Africa. In Israel, The Skystar aerostats were deployed by the IDF during Operation Protective Edge. As of May 2016, The Skystar systems have gained over one million operational hours.

At July 2016 RT established a subsidiary company named "Aero-T", which specializes in the development and manufacture of large aerostats. Aero-T's first product, the SkyGuard1, is a large aerostat in a Blimp shape, which can carry payloads of up to 90 kg, reach altitudes of up to 1,000 meters, and operate continuously for 7 days without maintenance.

== Products ==
SkyStar 300
A large tactical aerostat, with a maximum altitude 1,500 ft AGL and a maximum payload mass of 50 kg. The system's end of life was on December 31, 2015
SkyStar 330

A large tactical aerostat. Base on the SkyStar 300 with four optical fiber tether and an upgraded navigation system.

SkyStar 250
A medium sized tactical aerostat, with a maximum altitude 1,000 ft AGL and a maximum payload mass of 11 kg.
SkyStar 220
A medium sized tactical aerostat, with a maximum altitude of 1,000 ft AGL and a maximum payload mass of 9.5 kg.
SkyStar 180
A small tactical aerostat, with a maximum altitude of 1,000 ft AGL and a maximum payload mass of 6.5 kg.
SkyStar 100
A mini aerostat compact system, that can be transported, assembled, launched and operated by two personnel with minimal training.
