= Technify Motors =

German aircraft engine manufacturer

Technify Motors GmbH
- Industry: Aerospace
- Founder: Frank Thielert
- Fate: Sold to Continental Motors, Inc., July 2013
- Headquarters: Hamburg, Germany
- Key people: Jürgen Schwarz, Xiadong Yu
- Products: Aircraft Diesel engines
- Owner: Aviation Industry Corporation of China (AVIC)
- Subsidiaries: Centurion Engines, Superior Air Parts
- Website: www.technify.de

Technify Motors GmbH is an aircraft Diesel engine manufacturer based in Sankt Egidien, Germany. In July 2013, Chinese state-owned Aviation Industry Corporation of China (AVIC) acquired the aircraft Diesel engine designs and manufacturing assets of the former Thielert Aircraft Engines GmbH and added them to the Continental Motors Group as Technify Motors GmbH. The 5,000th engine was delivered in April 2017 after 15 years of production, accumulating more than 5.25 million flying hours and equipping over 2,750 aircraft.

== History ==
Thielert AG was a German financial holding company that has owned engine development and manufacturing companies. It was headquartered in Hamburg. Companies owned were Thielert Aircraft Engines GmbH with sites in Lichtenstein, Saxony and Altenburg, Thuringia. Thielert AG was quoted on the Frankfurt Stock Exchange and was a member of the SDAX.

Founded in 1989, turnover increased from €3.3 million in 1997 to €16.2 million in 2002, while employees grew from 27 to 112; Thielert Aircraft Engines was founded in 1999 to adapt Diesel engine for general aviation, entered Centurion 1.7 serial production in 2002 and had 86 employees in 2003.

The main operating unit, Thielert Aircraft Engines GmbH, declared insolvency on 24 April 2008 and was then run by an insolvency administrator, Bruno M. Kübler. The holding company, Thielert AG, also filed insolvency a week later on 30 April 2008 after the loss of its operational unit, Thielert Aircraft Engines GmbH. The holding company ceased operations in autumn of 2008. It was sold in July 2013 to Continental Motors, a subsidiary of Aviation Industry Corporation of China (AVIC).

=== Insolvency ===
On 6 March 2008 Thielert's financial statements for 2003, 2004 and 2005 were nullified by a Hamburg court, on the basis that the company had breached valuation provisions. As a result of these events the company's stock dropped to a record low of €0.36 from previous highs of €25.22 on the German stock market.

On 23 April 2008 it was announced that the company Board of Directors had dismissed "with cause" company founder Frank Thielert and also cancelled his employment contract, due to evidence found during a criminal investigation by the Hamburg Office of Criminal Investigation. The allegations included that false invoices had been written, which were used to boost accounts receivable and create the appearance of a better financial position for the company. The board also dismissed Chief Financial Officer Roswitha Grosser and sold off €24.4 million to cover immediate financial requirements.

In April 2008 a stockholder restructuring plan was put on hold and as a result on 24 April 2008 Thielert Aircraft Engines GmbH, responsible for all engine production, filed for insolvency at the Chemnitz County Court. As the situation deepened, the Thierlert board stated on 26 April 2008: "The going concern of Thielert Aircraft Engines GmbH can only be ensured permanently by restructuring activities with the support of investors, due to the fact that the Holding Thielert AG is not capable to do so anymore." The company announced that it would name a new executive board and an interim insolvency trustee.

In April 2008 Cessna suspended plans to sell a Diesel-equipped Cessna 172TD as a result of the insolvency.

On 1 May 2008 the board appointed a new CEO, lawyer Marcel Kleib and lawyer Achim Ahrendt of Hamburg was appointed to oversee the insolvency proceedings. On 5 May 2008 bankruptcy administrator attorney Bruno M. Kubler issued a letter to company customers indicating that the business would continue to operate producing engines and parts, meet existing orders, to preserve its capability to reorganize. On 14 May 2008 Thielert announced that it would no longer honor existing engine warranties for engines installed in Diamond Aircraft and also dramatically increased the price of parts. Owners who required warranty work were required to pay cash in advance for parts. This announcement caused an immediate negative reaction from Diamond DA42 owners and also from Diamond Aircraft.

On 18 June 2008 the company announced that it was resuming production of all its Diesel engine products, with a production target of 80 units per month. Thielert guaranteed the new engines against defective materials and labor, but parts prices remained at the previously announced high levels.

On 10 July 2008 Diamond Aircraft announced that it was dropping out of the bidding to purchase Thielert, citing that Thielert withheld key information "vital to the due diligence process", although Thielert disagreed. On Friday 11 July 2008, Thielert issued a press release stating: "the reasons Diamond is presenting for its non-participation are clearly pretext". Thielert implied that Diamond was not a serious prospective buyer and that "Diamond's actions clearly serve the purpose of derogating Thielert's reputation in the naive assumption to be able to subsequently purchase Thielert far under value."

As part of its insolvency, Thielert indicated that it would not honor warranties or inspect and replace life-limited parts as was the case when the engines were sold to customers. This change in policy has resulted in Thielert-powered aircraft being grounded or no longer economically viable to fly. In November 2008 Diamond Aircraft CEO Peter Maurer said the insolvency commissioner responsible for Thielert's restructuring has come to understand that the eventual sale of the company will depend on product support. This led to Thielert reducing the cost of parts and actively working on extending inspection and replacement requirements for gearbox clutches as well as other parts.

In January 2009, Bruno M. Kübler, Thielert's insolvency administrator announced that the company was, "in the black and working to capacity". On 6 April 2009 the company announced that insolvency administrator had "transferred the company's operative new business to a company that is unaffected by the insolvency proceedings". The new company, Centurion Engines, is responsible for worldwide sales of Centurion Diesel engines and spare parts.

At the end of November 2010 the company was making a profit and actively seeking new investors. Kübler indicated that major lending institutions have loosened credit enough that investment is more likely than it was in 2008 or 2009.

In 2016 Thielert was sentenced to four years in prison for fraud in misrepresenting the value and financial position of the company during attempts to find buyers and investors. In 2017 the Federal Court of Justice overturned the ruling of the Hamburg Regional Court in 2016 and referred the court back to it.

On 23 July 2013 the company was sold to Continental Motors, Inc. Continental is owned by AVIC International, which is, in turn, wholly owned by the Government of the People's Republic of China. Thielert was renamed Technify Motors GmbH. Continental uses Chinese investment to continue development of the company's products, with an emphasis on extending gearbox inspection periods initially.

== Products ==
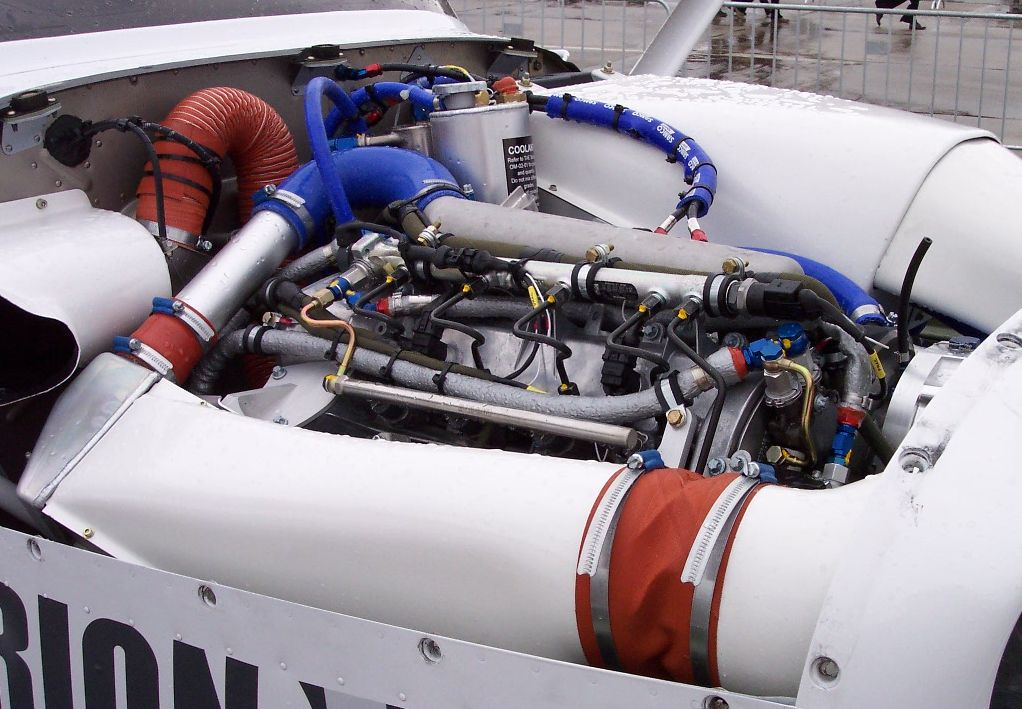
Thielert Centurion 1.7 installed in a Cessna 172

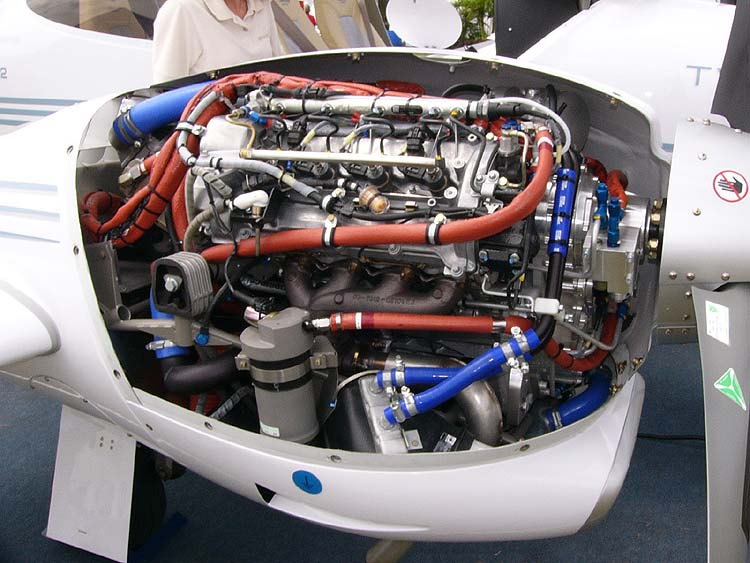
Thielert Centurion 1.7 Diamond DA42 installation.

Thielert Aircraft Engines GmbH was well known as the manufacturer of the Centurion range of aircraft Diesel engines that run on jet fuel. Two engine models were built, the Centurion 2.0 with a power output of 135 hp (101 kW), and the Centurion 2.0s with 155 hp (116 kW). The development of the third model, a 350 hp (261 kW) Centurion 4.0, was not completed. A fourth model, the 230 hp (172 kW) Centurion 3.2 was announced for 2008, but its final development was cancelled.

New built aircraft equipped with Thielert Centurion engines include:

- Diamond DA40 Diamond Star (Centurion 2.0)
- Diamond DA42 Twin Star (Centurion 2.0)
- Apex Aircraft's Robin DR400 135 CDI Ecoflyer (Centurion 2.0)
- Cessna 172 Skyhawk TD (Centurion 2.0 S) — Development suspended May 2008

Kits for the installation of retrofit Thielert engines exist for a number of aircraft, including the Piper PA-28 Cherokee and the Cessna 172 for the Centurion 2.0.

A Thielert Centurion 2.0 engine also powers an unmanned aerial vehicle, the General Atomics Warrior, an upgraded version of the General Atomics MQ-1 Predator.

A third field of activity is contract engine development and manufacture of engine parts for prototypes and small series for the automotive industry.
