= Diamond DA62 =

Twin engine light utility aircraft

DA52 and DA62
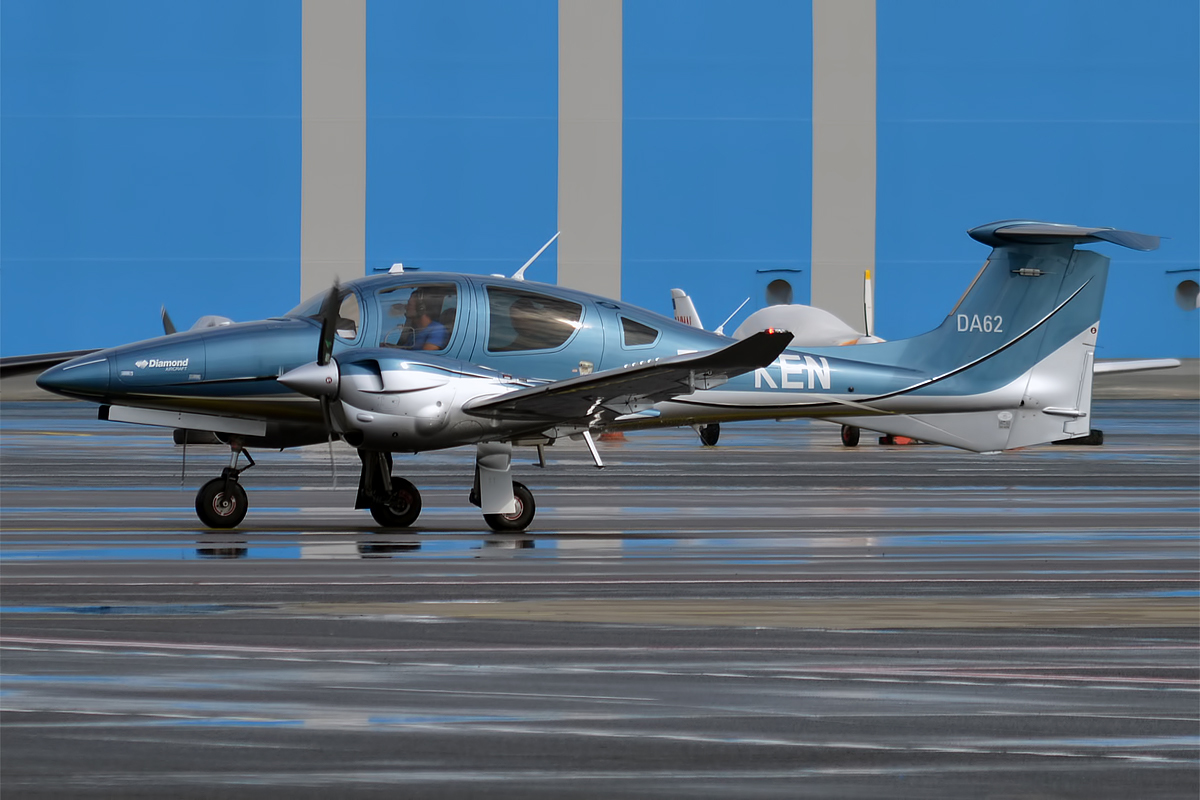
- DA62

General information
- Type: Twin engine light aircraft
- National origin: Austria
- Manufacturer: Diamond Aircraft Industries; Aeromot
- Status: In production (DA62)
- Number built: 273 (April 2024)

History
- Manufactured: 2015–present
- Introduction date: October 2015
- First flight: 3 April 2012
- Developed from: Diamond DA50

The Diamond DA62 is a five- to seven-seat, twin-engine light aircraft produced by Diamond Aircraft Industries and first announced in March 2012.

Initially designated as the DA52, the first prototype flew on in April 2012 after six months of development. In June 2014 the production aircraft was redesignated as the DA62. European Aviation Safety Agency (EASA) certification was granted in April 2015 and American Federal Aviation Administration (FAA) certification was granted in February 2016. Said to offer "twin power with single-engine simplicity" there have been 273 deliveries of the aircraft through early 2024.

== Design and development ==
The DA62 development team is headed by Diamond managing director Manfred Zipper. It is based upon the fuselage of the single-engine Diamond DA50, but with two Austro AE330 Diesel engines burning Jet A fuel. Company CEO Christian Dries indicated that the engines may be replaced with turboprops.

In flying the prototype from Diamond's Wiener Neustadt plant to the 2012 AERO Friedrichshafen aviation trade show, the aircraft achieved 16.6 mpg (14.2 litres/100 km) fuel efficiency, the result of improvements in cooling drag and aerodynamic drag made during its development.

The company originally intended to have the aircraft available for sale in July 2013 and expected to offer fly-by-wire controls as an option by 2014, but development was delayed and those dates were not met. The DA62 was European Aviation Safety Agency (EASA)-certified on 16 April 2015. By September 2015, the company was preparing to deliver the first production DA62s to customers the following month and was manufacturing the first aircraft destined for the United States market—the tenth DA52/DA62 to be built and the third production aircraft—for an appearance at that year's National Business Aviation Association Convention in November. American Federal Aviation Administration (FAA) certification was received on 23 February 2016. The FAA certification came ten months after EASA certification. At the 2016 AERO Friedrichshafen show, Diamond's CEO Christian Dries reported that production would be increased to 60–62 aircraft per year to meet strong demand.

The aircraft is available in two weight versions. The "European" version has five seats and a maximum takeoff weight (MTOW) of 1,999 kilograms (4,407 lb), the "US" version has seven seats and a MTOW of 2,300 kilograms (5,071 lb). The lower MTOW of the "European" version is to allow operators to avoid higher weight-based air traffic control user charges. The third row of seating and increased MTOW of the "US" version are available as factory options at extra cost. At the 2016 AERO Friedrichshafen, Christian Dries said a special version with an additional baggage belly pod was under consideration for the air charter market.

In January 2023, it was announced that Aeromot will assemble DA62s in Brazil from kits supplied by Diamond Aircraft Canada, starting in 2025. The intention is to ramp-up production to 50 aircraft per year. The completed aircraft will be sold primarily in the South American market.

By April 2019 more than 120 DA62s had been delivered. 273 had been delivered by April 2024. DA62 aircraft are built in both Austria and Canada.

== Operational history ==
Among private owners is the current Chancellor of Germany, Friedrich Merz. His use of a DA62 to attend the wedding of Minister of Finance Christian Lindner in July 2022 received media attention after he stated that the aircraft consumed less fuel than official limousines. Subsequent fact checking by German media noted that the comparison favoured the aircraft only when accounting for the lower speeds and indirect routes required for road travel.

On October 6, 2023, the Nigerian Air Force acquired four DA 62 MPPs, registered in Nigeria as NAF260/261/262/263.

In July 2024, a contract was signed for the sale of three DA62 MPPs for €23.3 million. They were bought by Greece for the Hellenic Fire Service, to serve as air operations centers for firefighting and SAR, as well for aerial surveillance and damage assessment. The delivery was completed on 13 November 2025, with the Greek Prime Minister, Kyriakos Mitsotakis, also noting their additional potential use for border surveillance missions.

== Variants ==
Diamond DA52 prototype on its maiden flight, 3 April 2012, Wiener Neustadt, Austria

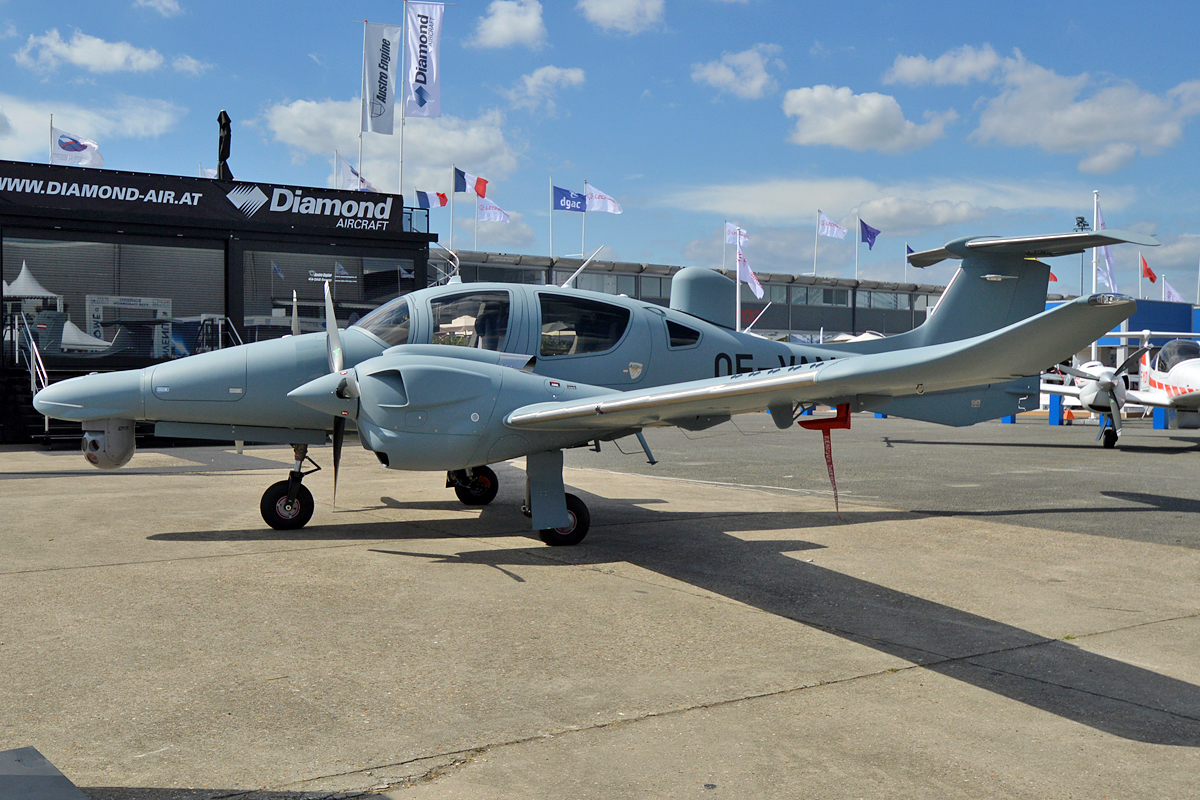
Diamond DA62 with surveillance sensors at Paris Air Show 2017

DA52
Prototype, two built.
DA62
Five–seven seat production variant with an extra third window and larger horizontal stabilizer.
DA62 MPP
"Multi-Purpose Platform" variant intended for law enforcement, search and rescue, and surveillance operations.

== Specifications (DA62) ==
Data from Air International and Diamond Aircraft website

General characteristics

- Crew: one
- Capacity: up to six passengers
- Length: 9.19 m (30 ft 2 in)
- Wingspan: 14.55 m (47 ft 9 in)
- Height: 2.82 m (9 ft 3 in)
- Wing area: 17.10 m^{2} (184.1 sq ft)
- Empty weight: 1,570 kg (3,461 lb)
- Max takeoff weight: 2,300 kg (5,071 lb)
- Fuel capacity: 326 litres (72 imp gal; 86 US gal)
- Powerplant: 2 × Austro AE330 turbocharged 2.0 liter diesel aircraft engines, 134 kW (180 hp) each
- Propellers: 3-bladed MT propeller MTV-6-R-C-F/CF 194-80

Performance

- Maximum speed: 356 km/h (221 mph, 192 kn) True Air Speed (TAS) at Maximum Continuous Power (MCP) at 14,000 ft (4,267 m).
- Cruise speed: 317 km/h (197 mph, 171 kn) (TAS) at 75% power
- Stall speed: 125 km/h (78 mph, 67 kn)
- Never exceed speed: 379 km/h (235 mph, 205 kn)
- Range: 2,380 km (1,480 mi, 1,290 nmi)
- Endurance: 10 h
- Service ceiling: 6,096 m (20,000 ft)
- Rate of climb: 5.2 m/s (1,029 ft/min)
- Fuel consumption: 7.4 US gal (28 L) per hour total at loiter, 11.8 US gal (45 L) per hour at 60% (12,000 ft) in total

Avionics

- Garmin G1000Nxi
