= Aeronautics Defense Systems =

Israeli defense company

Aeronautics Defense Systems Ltd.
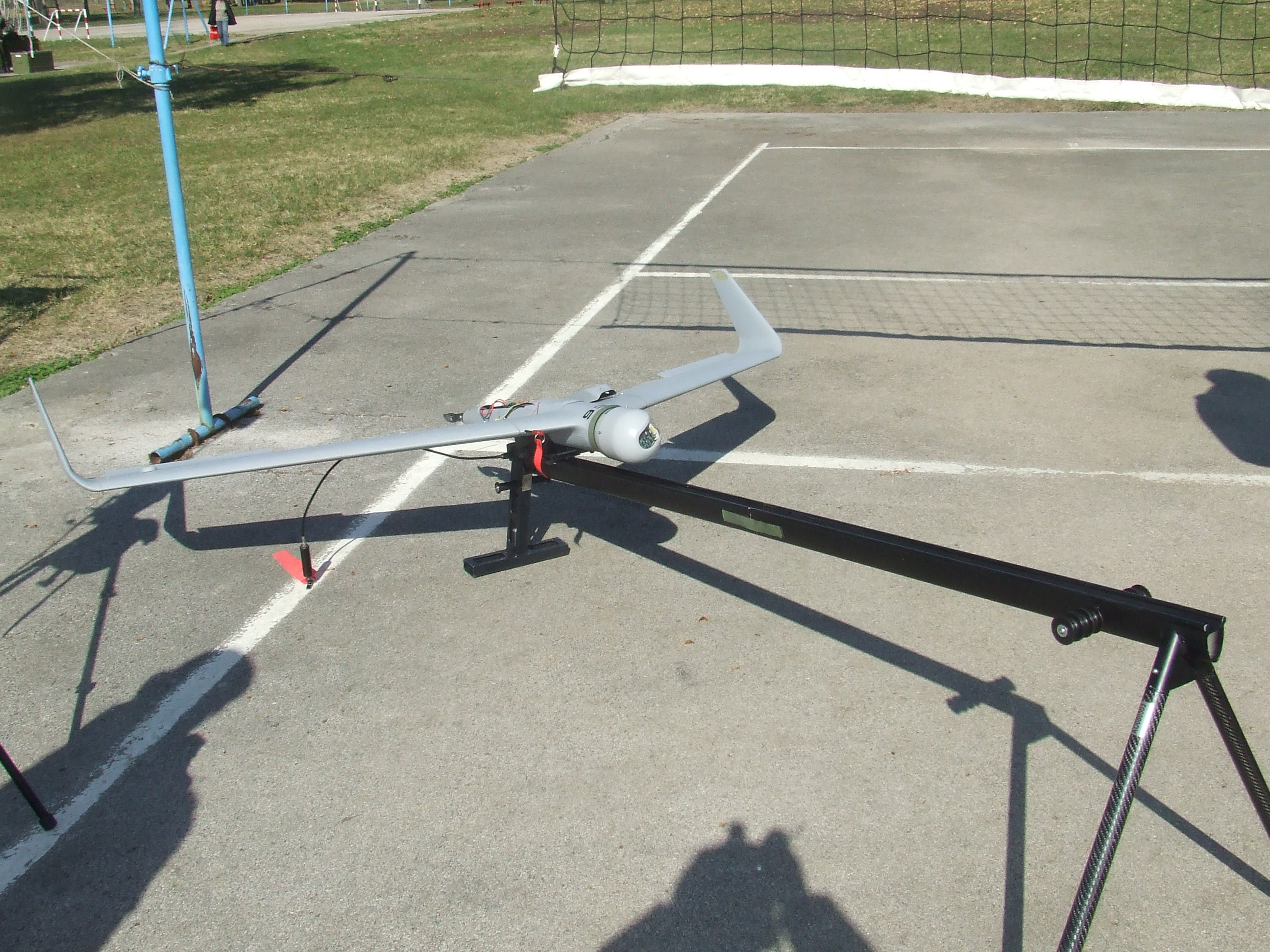
- Aeronautics Defense Orbiter Mini UAV System
- Native name: אירונאוטיקס בע"מ
- Type: Limited company
- Industry: Defense Aerospace
- Founded: 1997; 29 years ago
- Founder: Zvika Nave, Moshe Caspi, Avi Leumi
- Headquarters: Yavne, Israel
- Key people: Amos Mathan (CEO)
- Products: Unmanned aerial vehicles
- Revenue: ▲₪ 550 million (2015)
- Owner: Rafael Advanced Defense Systems
- Number of employees: 600 (2015)
- Parent: Rafael Advanced Defense Systems
- Subsidiaries: RT Aerostats Systems; Zanzottera Technologies; Commtact
- Website: www.aeronautics-sys.com

Aeronautics Defense Systems, doing business as Aeronautics, is an Israeli defense contractor headquartered in Yavne, Israel. The company primarily manufactures unmanned aerial vehicles for both military and civilian applications. Aeronautics’ senior management is made up of figures from Israel's defense, financial and political sectors. The company's CEO is Amos Mathan, who was the CEO of Soltam Systems. The chairman of the board is Yedidia Yaari, a retired vice admiral who was the commander-in-chief of the Israeli Navy from 2000 to 2004 and the president of defense firm Rafael Advanced Defense Systems Ltd. from 2004 to 2015.

On September 2, 2019, the company was acquired by Rafael Advanced Defense Systems, and Israeli businessman Avihai Stolero.

== History ==
The company was founded by Zvika Nave, Moshe Caspi and Avi Leumi in 1997 as a start-up called NETS Integrated Avionics Systems. Since its inception, Aeronautics focused on developing low cost, miniature unmanned aerial systems. In 2000, the company introduced the world's smallest avionics system, which later evolved into the Orbiter 1kg UAV.

In 2004, Aeronautics launched Seastar, one of the world's first unmanned surface vehicles. The drone can be equipped with day/night cameras, electronic surveillance sensors, sonar, and a stabilized weapons mount for a gun, or less-lethal weapons.

In 2006, Aeronautics signed a $250 million deal with Nigeria to supply unmanned aerial vehicles and unmanned marine vessels to protect the Niger Delta area, the country's main stockpile of oil.

In 2007, Internet entrepreneur Avi Shaked (founder of 888 Holdings) acquired a 33% stake in the company for $20 million.

In 2009, Viola Private Equity partners, a group founded by investor Shlomo Dovrat, bought $20 million worth of the company's preference shares at a valuation of $200 million.

In 2012, Finland's Ministry of Defense entered a deal with Aeronautics. The deal included 55 unmanned aerial systems. The acquisition aimed at giving the nation's armed forces new surveillance, target acquisition and reconnaissance capabilities.

== Controversies ==
On August 29, 2017, the Defense Export Controls Agency of the Israeli Ministry of Defense suspended Aeronautics' permit to export Orbiter 1K model UAV to Azerbaijan. The move came after report that Aeronautics representatives conducted a live-fire test of its Orbiter 1K model against Armenian forces in the Nagorno-Karabakh at the request of the Azerbaijani military. According to Armenian military officials, two soldiers were wounded as a result of the attack on July 7, 2017.

In 2018, the Justice Ministry said prosecutors intended to press charges against Aeronautics’ employees for aggravated fraud and violations of the defense export law. Aeronautics and three of its senior employees were charged on December 30, 2021, with "violating the law regulating defense exports in its dealing with one of its most prominent clients".

== Subsidiaries ==
- Commtact Ltd: develops a variety of microwave data link communications – Transmitters, Receivers and Antenna Systems in a wide spectrum of frequencies band. Aeronautics holds 100%.
- RT Ltd: a company that designs and manufactures the SkyStar family of aerostats, for use in intelligence, surveillance, reconnaissance and communications applications. Aeronautics holds 51% of RT.
- CONTROP Precision Technologies Ltd: a developer and manufacturer of electro-optical and precision motion control systems, acquired in 2012. Aeronautics holds 50% of Controp jointly with Rafael Advanced Defense Systems, which holds the other 50%.
- Zanzottera SRL: an Italian company, acquired in 2004, which is dedicated to the design, development and production of piston engines for the propulsion of small and medium-sized UAVs. Aeronautics holds 100% of Zanzottera.
- Azad Systems: an Azerbaijani company, established in 2011 with assistance from Aeronautics Defense Systems. It is considered a joint venture with the Azerbaijani government, and Aeronautics has an option to acquire 50% of the shares.

== Products ==
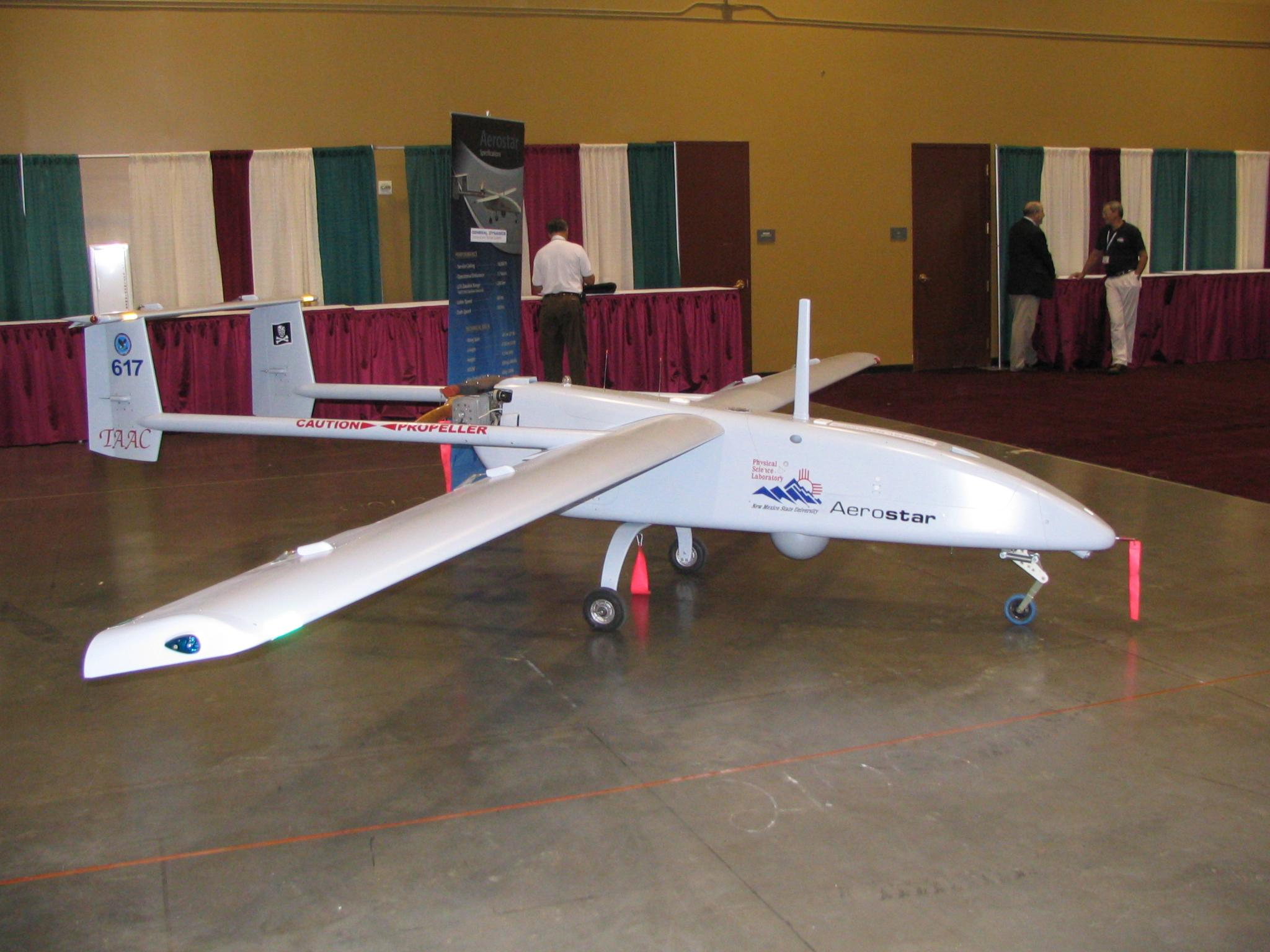
Aerostar

=== Unmanned aerial systems (UASs) ===
- Dominator MALE UAS

The Dominator UAS is a twin-engine medium-altitude long endurance (MALE) UAV based on the Diamond DA-42 aircraft. The 1800 kg (MTOW) Dominator can stay airborne for 24 hours and carry a payload of 415 kg. It was introduced in 2011. It is also involved in a civil UAS program in Canada operated in cooperation by Aeronautics and CAE.

- Aerostar Tactical UAS

Aerostar Tactical UAS was introduced in 2001 and operated since by some 15 customers worldwide, accumulating 130,000 operational hours (Nov. 2013). Aerostar was one of the first UAS to operate in civil missions such as an oil rigs protection program near the shores of Angola, as well as in military leasing programs in the Middle East and in Afghanistan. The 230 kg (MTOW) Aerostar can stay airborne for 12 hours, operate at the range of 250 km, and carry 50 kg of payloads.

- Orbiter 3 STUAS

The Orbiter 3 Small Tactical UAS (STUAS) is an electrically powered, field deployed UAS designed for military and homeland security missions. Operated by 3 personnel, Orbiter 3 is launched from a vehicle mounted launcher and lands using a parachute and an airbag. Weighing up to 30 kg, Orbiter 3 can fly for 7 hours up to the range of 100 km. It carries a multi sensor camera with day and night channels and a laser pointer. Due to its special structure and quiet electrical motor the Orbiter has a very low electromagnetic and acoustic signature, which makes it difficult to detect in the field of battle. Orbiter 3 is operated by 6 international military customers.

- Orbiter Mini UAS

The Orbiter Mini UAS is a compact and lightweight electrically powered system, operated by 2 soldiers. It is carried and deployed in backpacks or from a small vehicle. The Orbiter MUAS is launched from a miniature launcher and lands using a parachute and an airbag. Weighing up to 10 kg, Orbiter MUAS can fly for 4 hours up to the range of 80 km. It carries a multi sensor camera with day and night channels and a laser pointer. Due to its special structure and quiet electrical motor the Orbiter has a very low electromagnetic and aquatic signature, which makes it difficult to detect in the field of battle. Orbiter Mini UAS is operated by some 20 military, homeland security and civil customers worldwide.

=== Intelligence, surveillance, target acquisition and reconnaissance (ISTAR) ===
- AISR

Aerial intelligence surveillance and reconnaissance systems onboard fixed wing and rotary wing aircraft.

- GISR

Aeronautics' ground ISR (GISR) incorporates electro optical sensors, elevation systems and operator interfaces. Aeronautics GISR was delivered to several international military and HLS customers.

- Skystar surveillance aerostat

The Skystar surveillance aerostat system provides its users with an "eye in the sky" at the altitude of 300–500 meters above the ground level. Tethered to the ground, the aerostat may stay airborne for long days with very short breaks for helium refill once in every 3 days. The Skystar may identify a target at the range of over 20 km. Skystar currently serves over 10 military and HLS customers worldwide.

== See also ==
- Israel Aerospace Industries
