= C20H22N2O2 =

The molecular formula C_{20}H_{22}N_{2}O_{2} (molar mass: 322.41 g/mol, exact mass: 322.1681 u) may refer to:

- Akuammicine
- Gelsemine
- Oil Blue A
- Pleiocarpamine
- Strictamine
