= Aatida Amaase =

Tulunadu holiday

Aati amaase (Tulu:ಆಟಿ ಅಮಾಸೆ) it is also called as Aati Amavese, Ashada Amavase, Aati Amavasye, Deevige Karkataka Amavasya or Bhimana Amavasya. It is celebrated in the Aati month of the tulu calendar in Tulunadu region on the new moon day. Aati is the fourth month of the oldest traditional Indian solar calendar. On this auspicious day tulunadu people drink Paaleda Kashaya which is bitter in taste. It cleans the digestive tracts systems and is said to have loads of medicinal power to fight diseases. Therefore, people advised to have paaleda kashaya on an empty stomach. Tuluva being the worshipers of Mother Nature, show gratitude towards this divine tree.

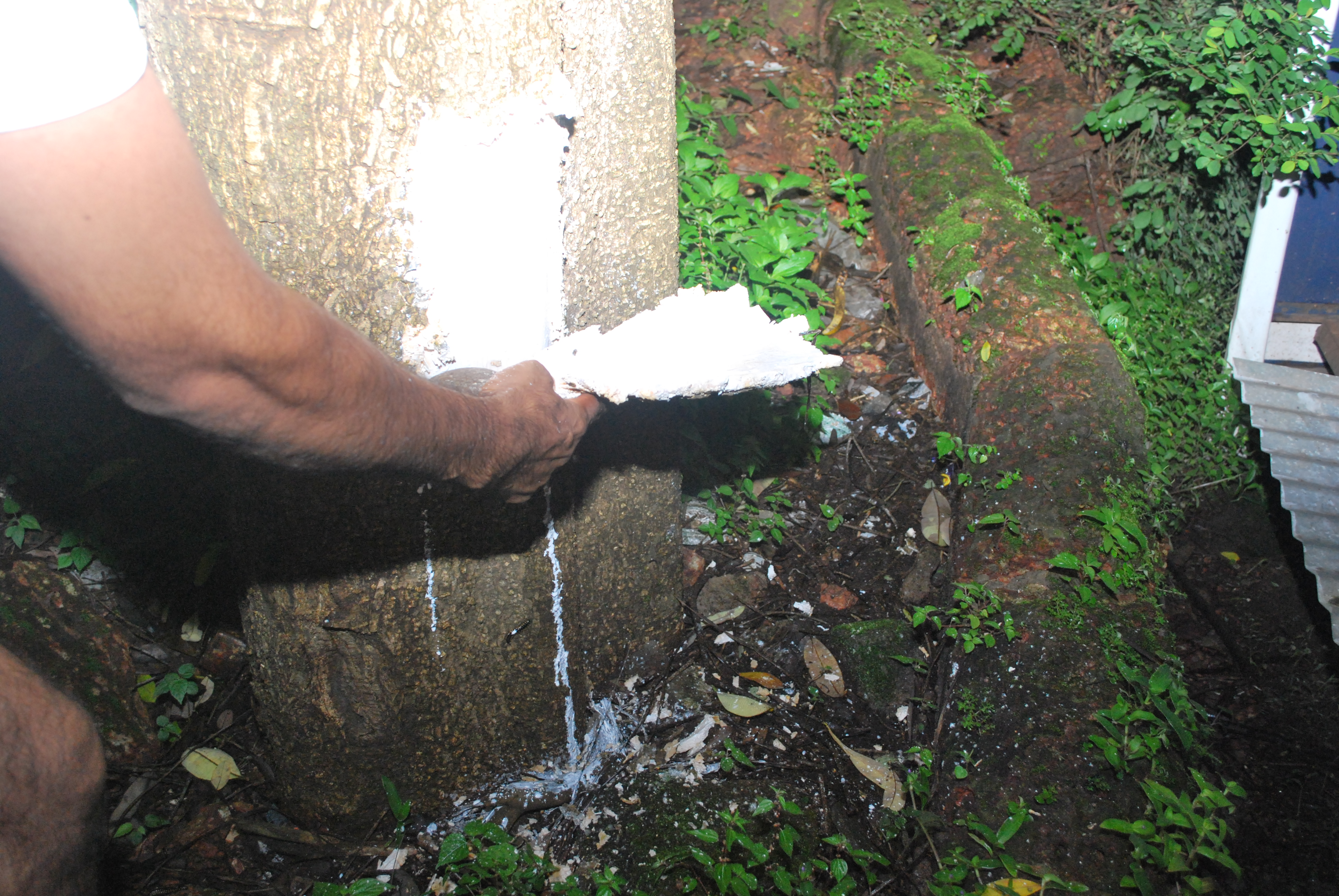
Romoving Alstonia scholaris tree bark

== Paale ketteda kashaya ==
Tulunadu people drink ‘Paale ketteda kashaya’, a bitter Ayurvedic decoction to mark Aati Amavasya day, in the households. The Paale mara(Tulu Language) or Saptaparni in Sanskrit, Halemara in Kannada, botanically known as Alstonia scholaris is also known as Devil tree in English.

=== The Kashaya (decoction) preparation ===
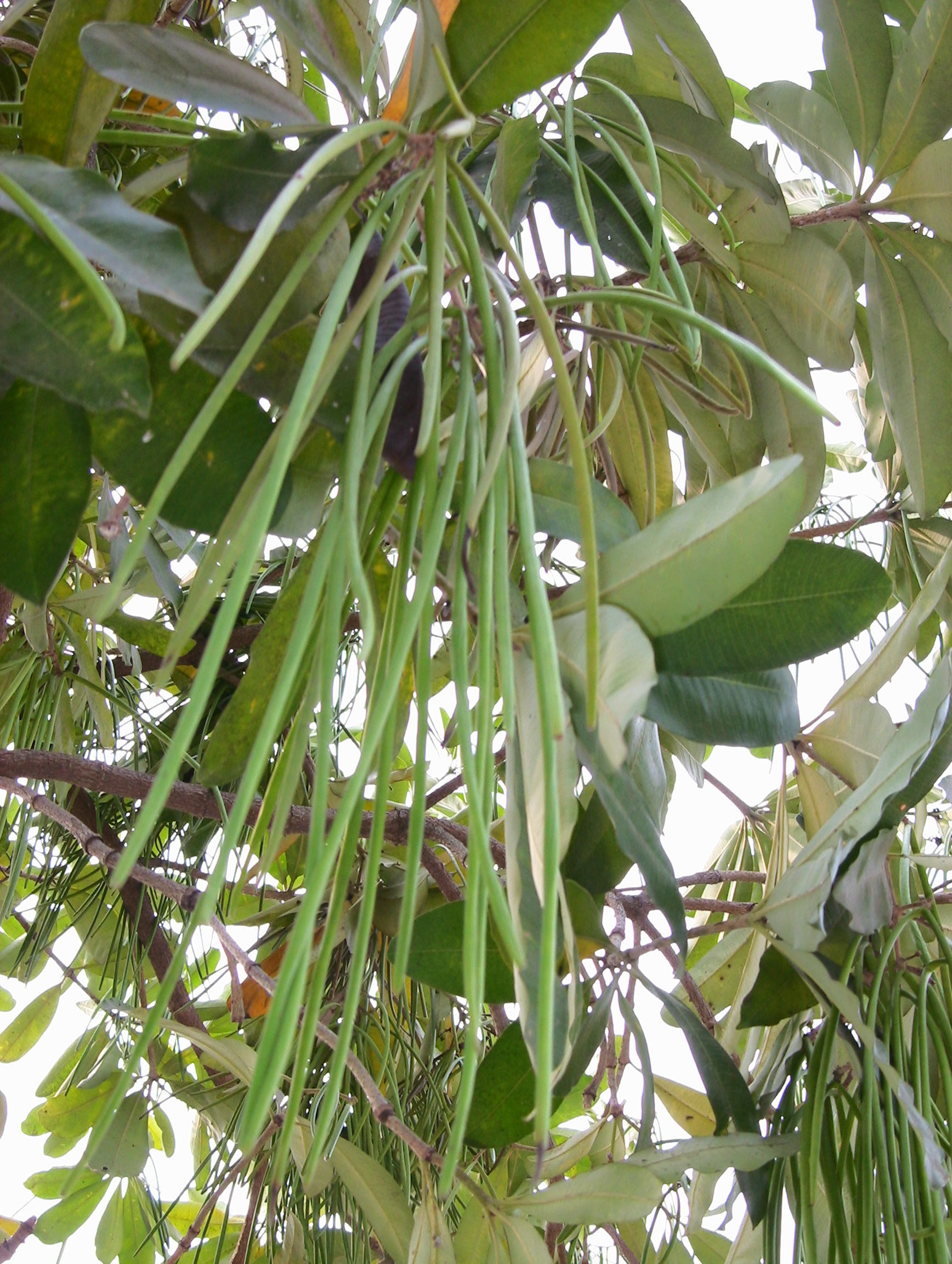
Paale mara flower

Traditionally, people of tulunadu used to clean the surroundings of paale mara the previous day of new moon day and tie the tree with rope dry banana leaves and keep a stone under the tree. So, they can identify the paale mara easily in the early morning and pray with the tree, "Hey divine Tree, you fill with the entire medicinal aspects tomorrow. Please bless with good health after having your bark/skin". It also has divine status in this region. On aati amaase day, (the next day) before sunrise the bark/skin of the paale mara should be collected with the help of a stone and decoction prepared from it. The special care should be taken in the identification of the tree. Very outer skin(black coloured) is removed and inner white part is crushed by adding a little water, to make kashaya. The tree bark is grinded by using a stone. And this ayurvedic concoction is prepared by mixing ingredients of pepper, turmeric, ajwain, garlic, and seeds into it. And scorch a pebble or iron bar and place in the decoction. After oblation to god and finally people intake the Kashaya. It tastes highly bitter, because it has ensemble medicinal contents. This juice is called Paaleda kashaya.

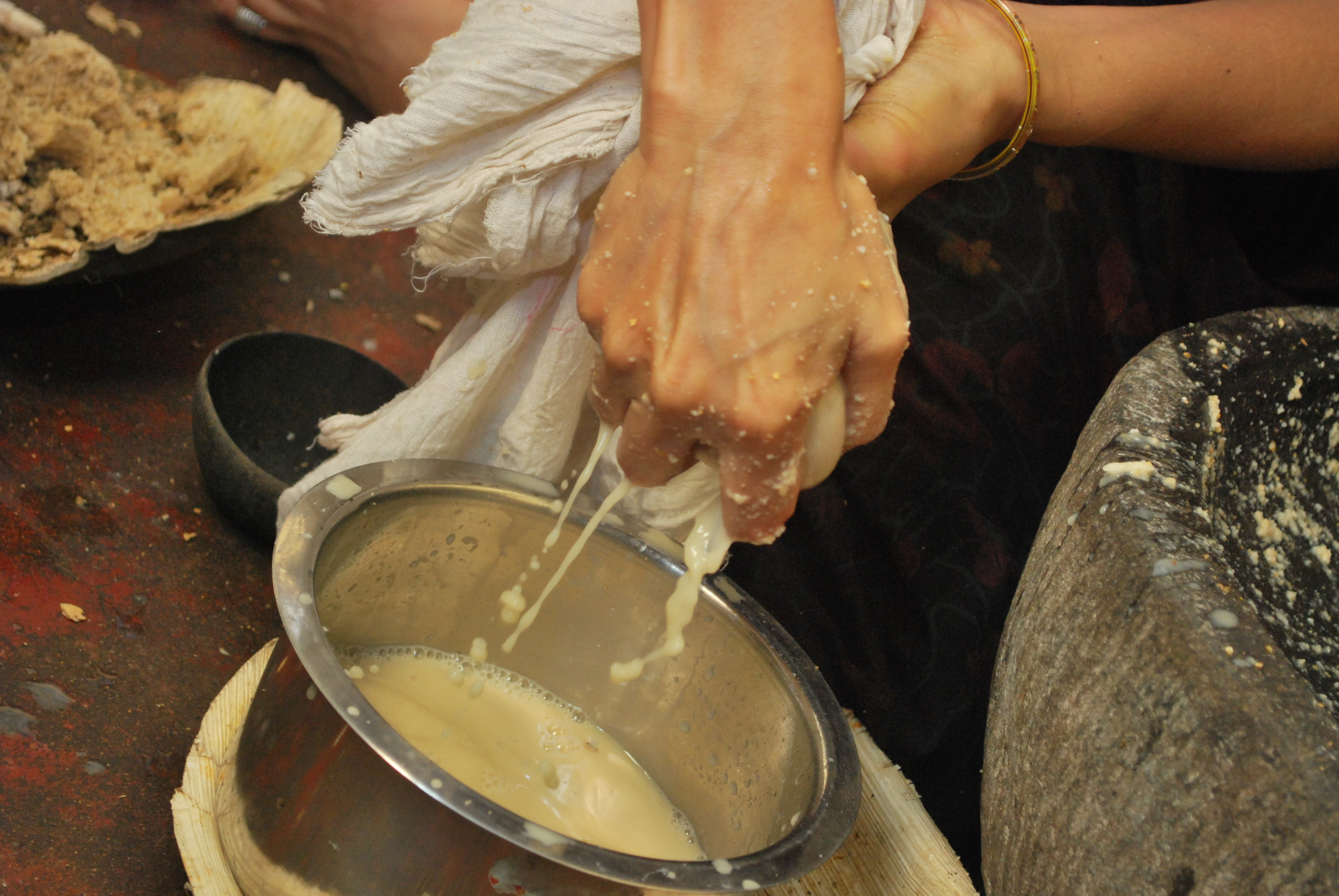
Paale mara kashaya preparation

After intake of Kashaya, there is a habit of eating roasted cashews, pappads and Shendige, menthe and coconut rice.

== Aati Agel ==
On amavase day evening tulu people make " Guru karnvereg Agel". Agel is a system of arranging meals to our ancestors. It is a kind of religious belief of tuluvas. All the members of the family are gathered together to prepare the Agel. They usually prepare and serve neer dosa, chicken curry and country alcohol to offer the demi spirits, deities and departed forefathers of tulu people.

== proverb ==
- Proverb in Tulu "aati aned popini, sona kudred popini" which means aati travels slowly with no work at home like riding on an Elephant, and sona travels as fast as if riding on a horse!
