= C21H22N2O4 =

The molecular formula C_{21}H_{22}N_{2}O_{4} may refer to:

- 25N-N1-Nap
- Picralinal
