= C22H26N2O2 =

The molecular formula C_{22}H_{26}N_{2}O_{2} (molar mass: 350.45 g/mol) may refer to:

- Oil Blue 35, a blue anthraquinone dye
- Vinpocetine, a synthetic derivative of the vinca alkaloid vincamine
