= Alschomine =

Identifiers
CAS Number	123045-72-7
3D model (JSmol)	Interactive image
ChemSpider	10258956
PubChem CID	11969856
UNII	ZQ4R8F8GXS
- InChI: InChI=1S/C21H24N2O5/c1-4-12-11-23(25)16-9-13(12)18(19(24)27-3)20-10-17(26-2)28-21(16,20)22-15-8-6-5-7-14(15)20/h4-8,11,13,16-18,22H,9-10H2,1-3H3/b12-4+/t13?,16?,17-,18?,20?,21?/m0/s1 Key: WHAYYXYTINYKPT-XWEYRWPWSA-N
- SMILES: C/C=C\1/C=[N+]([C@H]2C[C@@H]1C([C@@]34[C@@]2(Nc5c3cccc5)O[C@H](C4)OC)C(=O)OC)[O-]

Properties
Chemical formula	C_{21}H_{24}N_{2}O_{5}
Molar mass	384.432 g·mol^{−1}
- Except where otherwise noted, data are given for materials in their standard state (at 25 °C [77 °F], 100 kPa). Infobox references

Alschomine is an indole alkaloid first identified in the leaves of Alstonia scholaris in 1989.

== See also ==
- Picrinine
