= Pleiocarpamine =

Names
- IUPAC name (16S,19E)-19,20-Didehydro-1,16-cyclocorynan-17-oic acid
- Systematic IUPAC name Methyl (2S,3E,12bS,13S)-3-ethylidene-1,3,4,6,7,12b-hexahydro-2H-2,12-methanoindolo[2,3-a]quinolizine-13-carboxylate

Identifiers
CAS Number	6393-66-4
3D model (JSmol)	Interactive image
ChEBI	CHEBI:141939
ChEMBL	ChEMBL3338254
ChemSpider	32775623
PubChem CID	5385014
UNII	4J3PV95ANL
CompTox Dashboard (EPA)	DTXSID80419616
- InChI: InChI=1S/C20H22N2O2/c1-3-12-11-21-9-8-14-13-6-4-5-7-16(13)22-18(14)17(21)10-15(12)19(22)20(23)24-2/h3-7,15,17,19H,8-11H2,1-2H3/b12-3-/t15-,17-,19-/m0/s1 Key: NTMOAQDHNZYZMZ-QWCNWJGKSA-N
- SMILES: C/C=C\1/CN2CCC3=C4[C@@H]2C[C@@H]1[C@H](N4C5=CC=CC=C35)C(=O)OC

Properties
Chemical formula	C_{20}H_{22}N_{2}O_{2}
Molar mass	322.408 g·mol^{−1}
- Except where otherwise noted, data are given for materials in their standard state (at 25 °C [77 °F], 100 kPa). Infobox references

Pleiocarpamine is a natural anticholinergic alkaloid.
