= Picralinal =

Names
- IUPAC name methyl (14E)-14-ethylidene-19-formyl-18-oxa-2,12-diazahexacyclo[9.6.1.1^{9,15}.0^{1,9.}0^{3,8}.0^{12,17}]nonadeca-3,5,7-triene-19-carboxylate

Identifiers
CAS Number	20045-06-1
3D model (JSmol)	Interactive image
ChemSpider	10258953
PubChem CID	5320550
UNII	9GB36L4QYM
- InChI: InChI=1S/C21H22N2O4/c1-3-12-10-23-16-8-14(12)19(11-24,18(25)26-2)20-9-17(23)27-21(16,20)22-15-7-5-4-6-13(15)20/h3-7,11,14,16-17,22H,8-10H2,1-2H3/b12-3- Key: RHBAENOZUZWALZ-BASWHVEKSA-N
- SMILES: C/C=C\1/CN2C3CC1C(C45C3(NC6=CC=CC=C64)OC2C5)(C=O)C(=O)OC

Properties
Chemical formula	C_{21}H_{22}N_{2}O_{4}
Molar mass	366.417 g·mol^{−1}
- Except where otherwise noted, data are given for materials in their standard state (at 25 °C [77 °F], 100 kPa). Infobox references

Picralinal is a bio-active alkaloid from Alstonia scholaris, a medicinal tree of West Africa.
