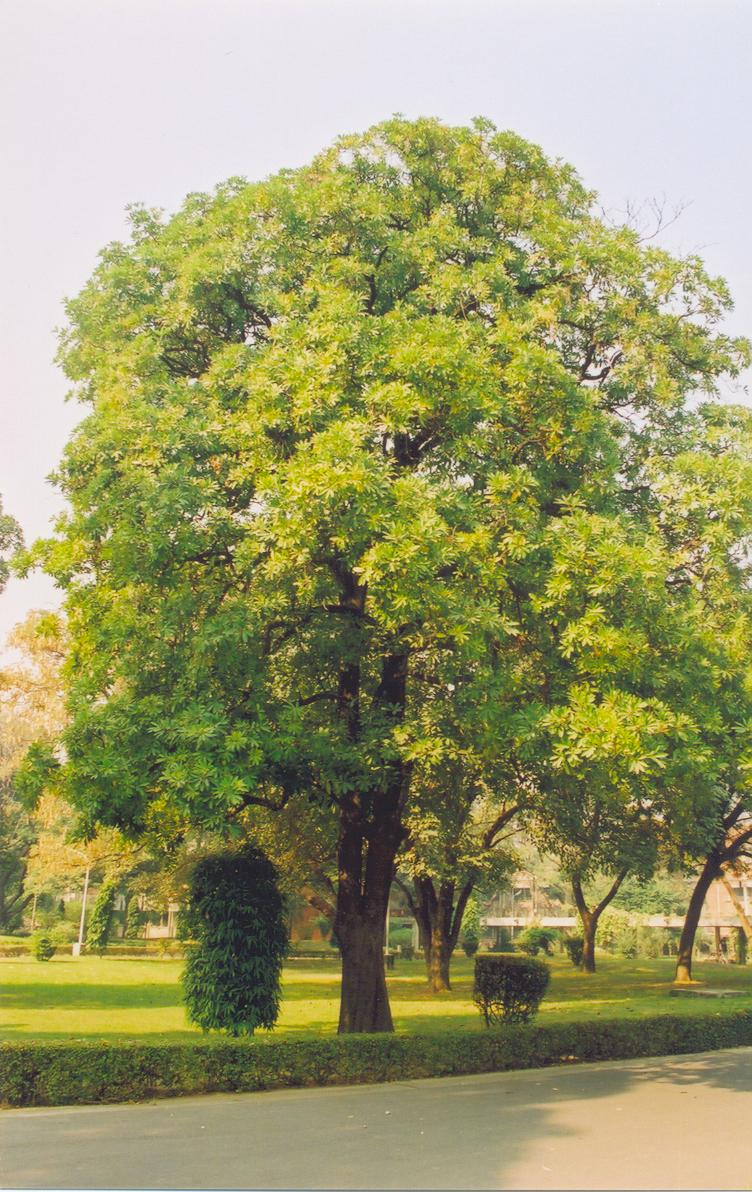

Conservation status
- Least Concern (IUCN 3.1)

Scientific classification
- Kingdom: Plantae
- Clade: Tracheophytes
- Clade: Angiosperms
- Clade: Eudicots
- Clade: Asterids
- Order: Gentianales
- Family: Apocynaceae
- Genus: Alstonia
- Species: A. scholaris

Binomial name
- Alstonia scholaris (L.) R.Br.
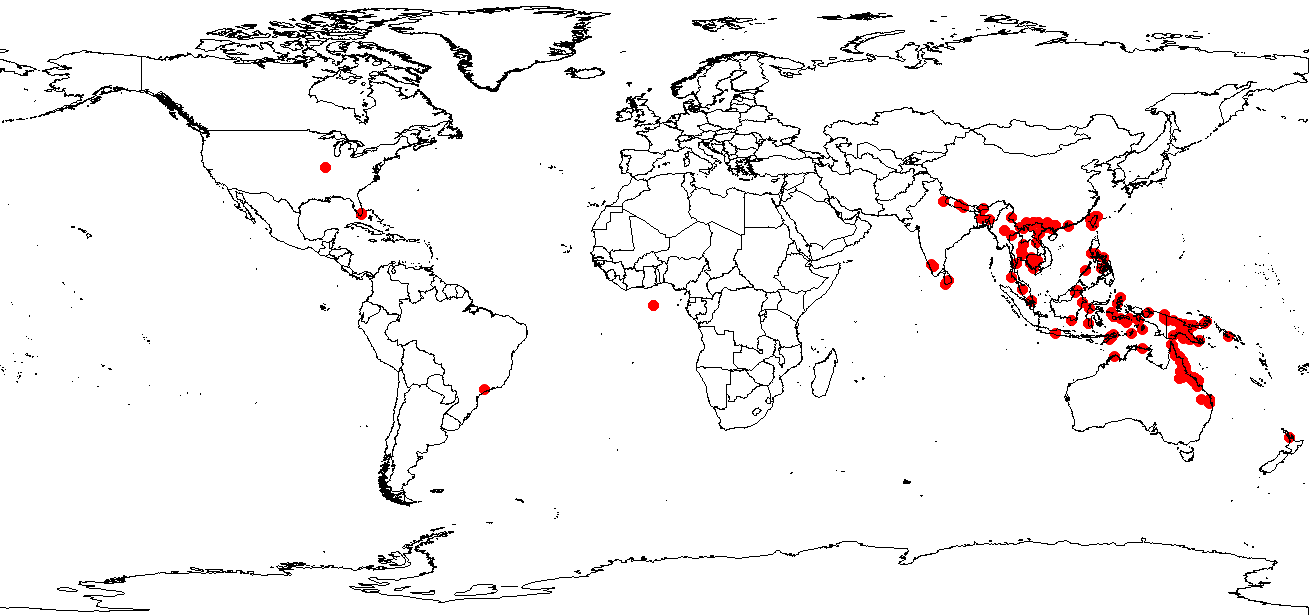
- Occurrence data from GBIF

Synonyms
- 10 synonyms: Echites scholaris L.; Nerium septaparna Jones; Pala scholaris (L.) Roberty; Alstonia kurzii Hook.f.; Alstonia scholaris var. avae A.DC.; Alstonia scholaris var. blumei A.DC.; Alstonia scholaris var. velutina Monach.; Alstonia spectabilis Kurz; Echites pala Buch.-Ham. ex Spreng.; Aeschynomene laevis Noronha

= Alstonia scholaris =

Species of flowering plant

Alstonia scholaris, commonly called blackboard tree, scholar tree, milkwood or devil's tree in English, is an evergreen tree in the oleander and frangipani family Apocynaceae. Its natural range is from Pakistan to China, and south to northern Australia. It is a toxic plant, but is used traditionally for myriad diseases and complaints. It is called 'Saptaparna' in India and is the sacred tree of the 2nd Jain tirthankar Ajitnatha. It was first described by Linnaeus in 1767, who gave it the name Echites scholaris.

== Description ==
Alstonia scholaris is a large tree growing up to 40 m (130 ft) tall (rarely to 60 m), with narrow buttressess that extend well up the trunk, giving it a fluted appearance. The bark is gray to pale gray with numerous lenticels, and all parts of the plant exude copious amounts of white sap when broken or cut.

The leaves are glossy dark green above and pale below, and they are arranged in whorls of four to eight, with petioles (leaf stalks) around 5–15 mm (0.20–0.59 in) long. The leaves are usually obovate (i.e. broadest near the apex) to elliptic, tapering towards the base and with a rounded tip, and there are 25 to 40 pairs of lateral veins at 80–90° to the midvein.

The inflorescences are much branched (cymose), with peduncles up to 7 cm (2.8 in) long, and are produced at the ends of the branches. The small tubular flowers are cream or white and strongly scented. They are about 10 mm (0.39 in) long and wide, with five ovate lobes. The calyx is about 2 mm (0.08 in) long, and the flower stalks are usually as long as or shorter. The corolla is white and tube-like, 6–10 mm (0.2–0.4 in) long. The lobes are broadly ovate or broadly obovate, 2–4.5 mm (0.08–0.2 in), overlapping to the left.

The fruit is a pair of long papery follicles measuring up to about 30 cm (12 in) long and 6 mm (0.24 in) diameter. They contain numerous flat, brown seeds about 5 mm (0.20 in) long and 1.2 mm (0.05 in) wide, which have long tufts of hairs at each end.

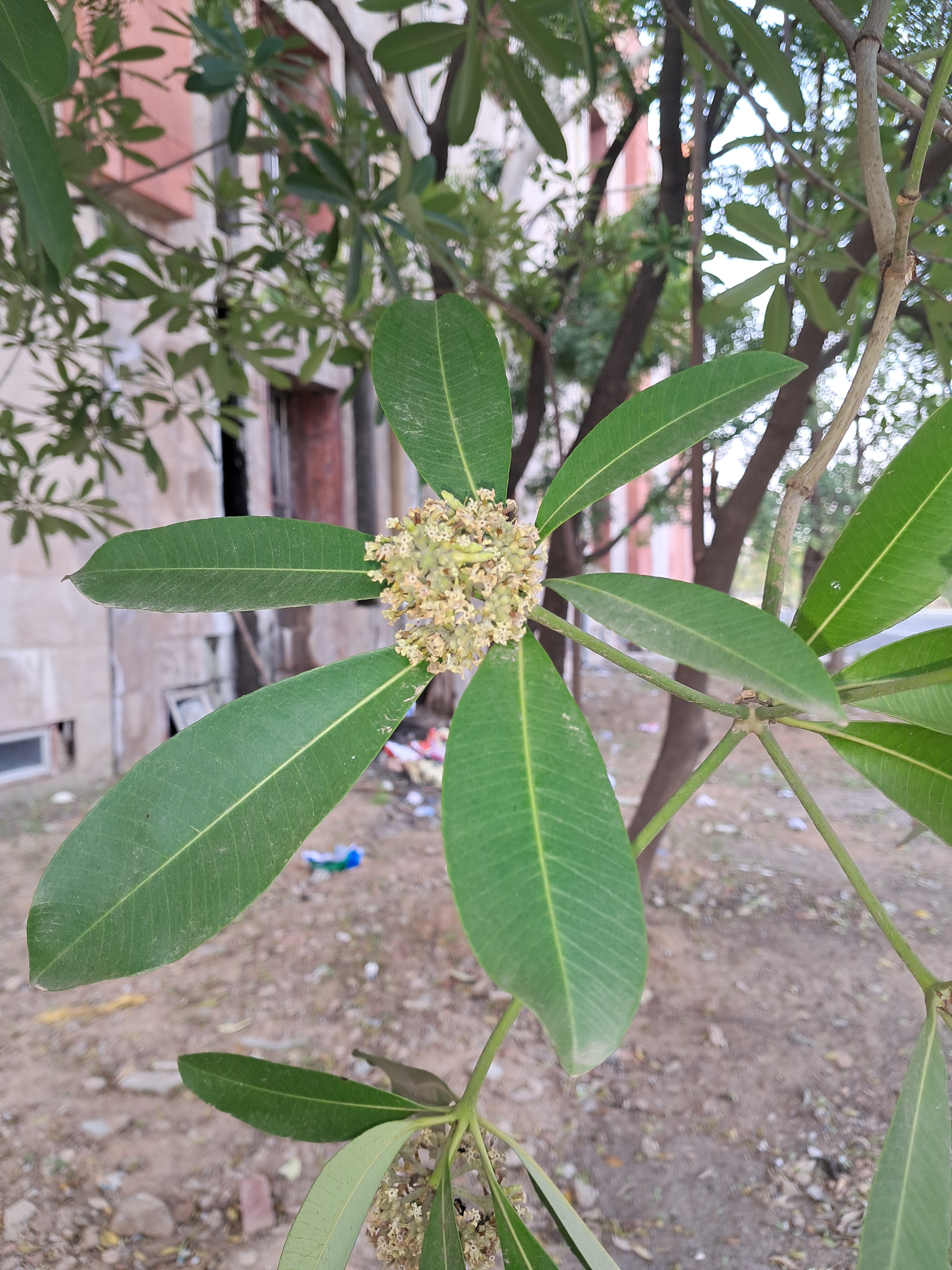
Flowers of Alstonia scholaris

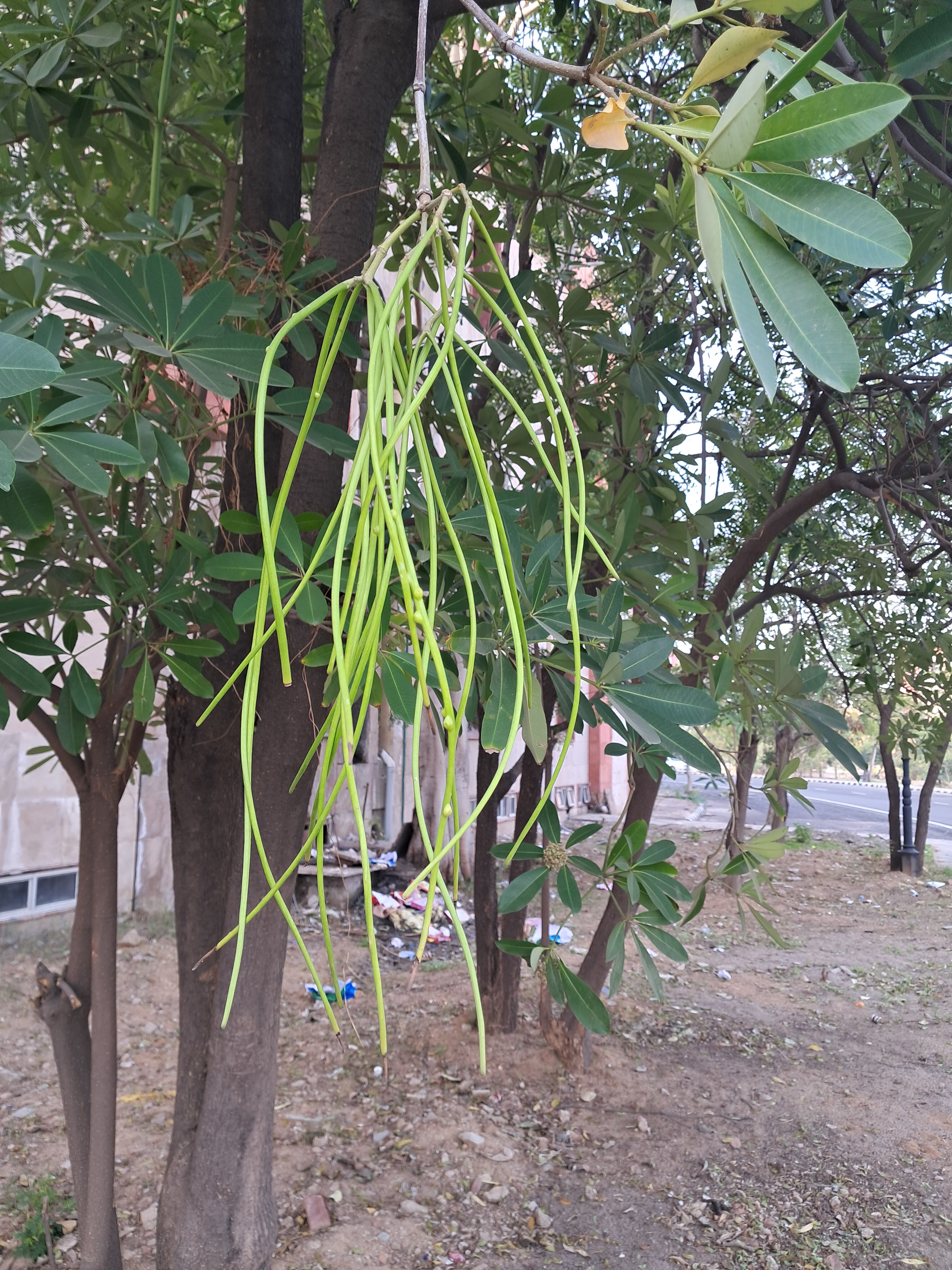
Fruits of Alstonia scholaris

== Taxonomy ==
This plant was originally named Echites scholaris by Carl Linnaeus in 1767. The Scottish botanist Robert Brown transferred it to the genus Alstonia in 1810, as part of his work on the taxonomy of Apocynaceae.

=== Etymology ===
The genus was named in honour of botanist Charles Alston, and the species epithet scholaris is a reference to the traditional use of the timber of this tree for blackboards in Myanmar.

== Distribution and habitat ==
Alstonia scholaris grows in a broad range of habitats in tropical and subtropical areas, in a range of forest types from rainforest to savannah, on a variety of soils including alluvial, volcanic and metamorphic, and at altitudes from sea level to more than 1,000 m (3,300 ft).

The tree is native to tropical and subtropical areas in the following countries/regions:

- China: China South-Central, China Southeast
- Indian subcontinent: Assam, Bangladesh, East Himalaya, India, Laccadive Islands, Nepal, Pakistan, Sri Lanka, West Himalaya
- Indo-China: Andaman Islands, Cambodia, Laos, Myanmar, Nicobar Islands, Thailand, Vietnam
- Malesia: Borneo, Jawa, Lesser Sunda Islands, Malaya, Maluku, Philippines, Sulawesi, Sumatera
- Papuasia: Bismarck Archipelago, New Guinea, Solomon Islands
- Australia: Northern Territory, Queensland, Western Australia

== Toxicity ==
This is a toxic plant. At high doses, an extract of the plant exhibited marked damage to all the major organs of the body in both rats and mice. The toxicity appears to depend on the plant organ studied, as well as the season it is harvested, with the bark collected in the monsoon season being the least toxic, and bark in the summer the most. Intraperitoneal administration is much more toxic than oral. Rats were more susceptible to the poison than mice, and pure-bred mice strains were more susceptible than crossbred. The toxic effects may be due to the alkaloid echitamine in the bark.

=== Chemistry ===
The bark contains the alkaloids ditamine, alschomine, echitenine, echitamine and strictamine. Echitamine is the most important alkaloid found in the bark, as it has been detected in all samples studied and collected from several locations. It is commercially sold as a herbal medicine. The alkaloid picralinal has been found in the leaves.

== Culture ==
Alstonia scholaris is the state tree of West Bengal, India, where it is called the chhaatim tree (in Bengali, ছাতিম).

During convocation the leaves of Alstonia scholaris (saptaparni) are awarded to graduates and postgraduates of Visva-Bharati University by the chancellor, given to him in turn by the Prime Minister of India. In recent years, supposedly to prevent excessive damage to the environment, the vice-chancellor of the University accepts one saptaparni leaf from the chancellor on behalf of all the students. This tradition was initiated by the founder of the University, Rabindranath Tagore.

The tree blossoms in the Northern Hemisphere subtropical autumn, and its flowers are thus widely regarded as a herald of autumn in Vietnam, especially in Hanoi. Called hoa sữa, literally 'milk flower' in reference to the color, its associations with romantic love and fleeting passion have become culturally embedded in poetry and popular music. However, its heady aroma has been a source of complaint and division, with some households even filing lawsuits against urban planning departments, for example in a case in 2011 in what was then Trà Vinh province.

== Uses ==
The wood of Alstonia scholaris has been recommended for the manufacture of pencils, as it is suitable in nature and the tree grows rapidly and is easy to cultivate. In Sri Lanka its light wood was used for coffins. The wood close to the root is very light and of white colour, and in Borneo was used for net floats, household utensils, trenchers, corks, etc. In Theravada Buddhism, the first Buddha is said to have used A. scholaris as the tree for achieving enlightenment.

The 1889 book The Useful Native Plants of Australia states that "the powerfully bitter bark of this tree is used by the natives of India in bowel complaints (Treasury of Botany). It has proved a valuable remedy in chronic diarrhoea and the advanced stages of dysentery. It has also been found effectual in restoring the tone of the stomach and of the system generally in debility after fevers and other exhausting diseases (Pharmacopoeia of India). It is described in the Pharmacopoeia of India as an astringent tonic, anthelmintic, and antiperiodic. It is held in the highest repute in the Phillippine [sic] Islands." Despite its widespread traditional use as an 'antiperiodic' (a medicine which was supposed to cure the effects of malaria), it was found to have little to very weak activity against the cause of the disease, Plasmodium falciparum. It had no effect against Giardia intestinalis, and weak effect against Entamoeba histolytica, which both cause diarrhoea.

== Gallery ==
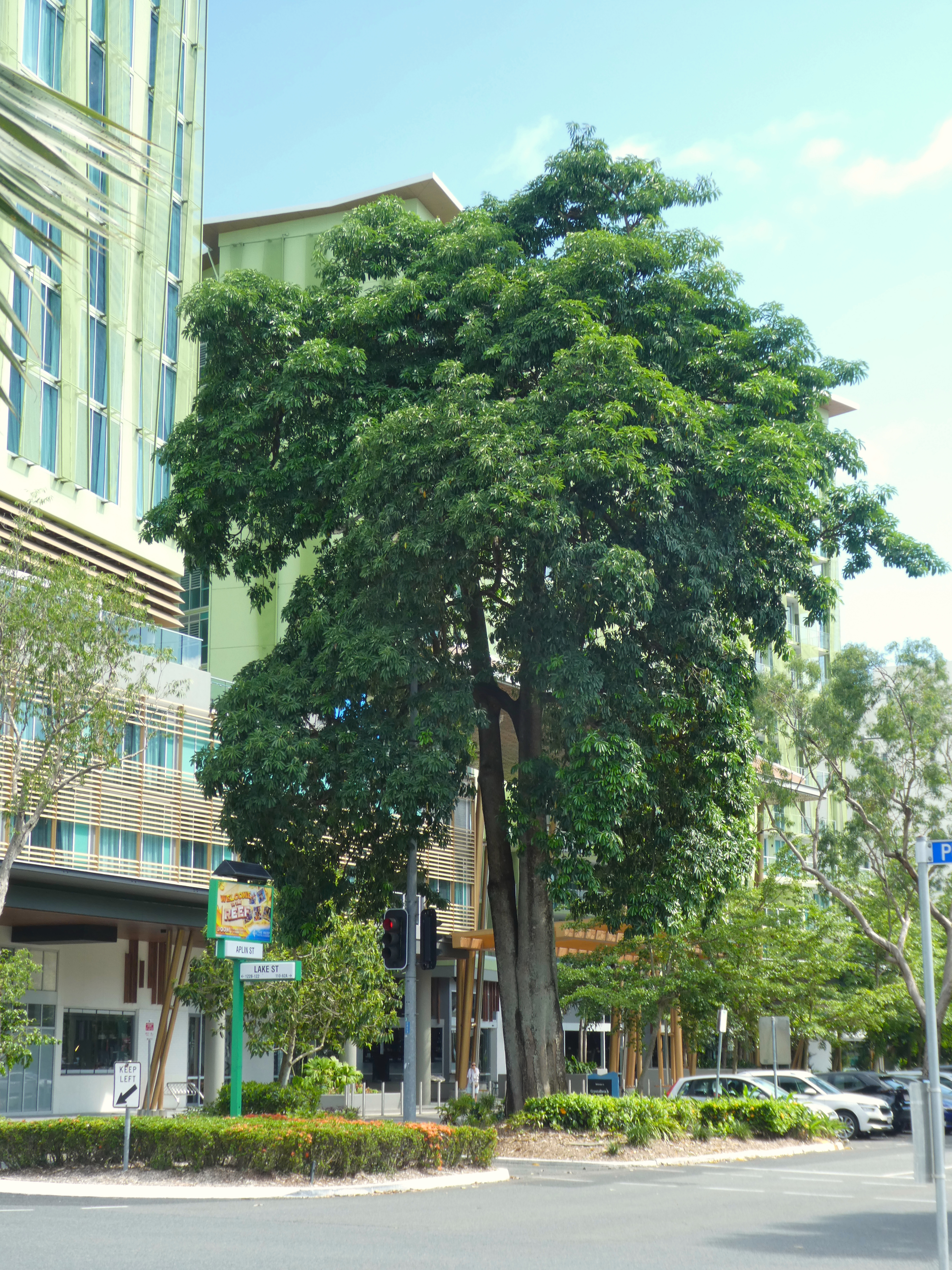
Mature tree in Cairns, Queensland

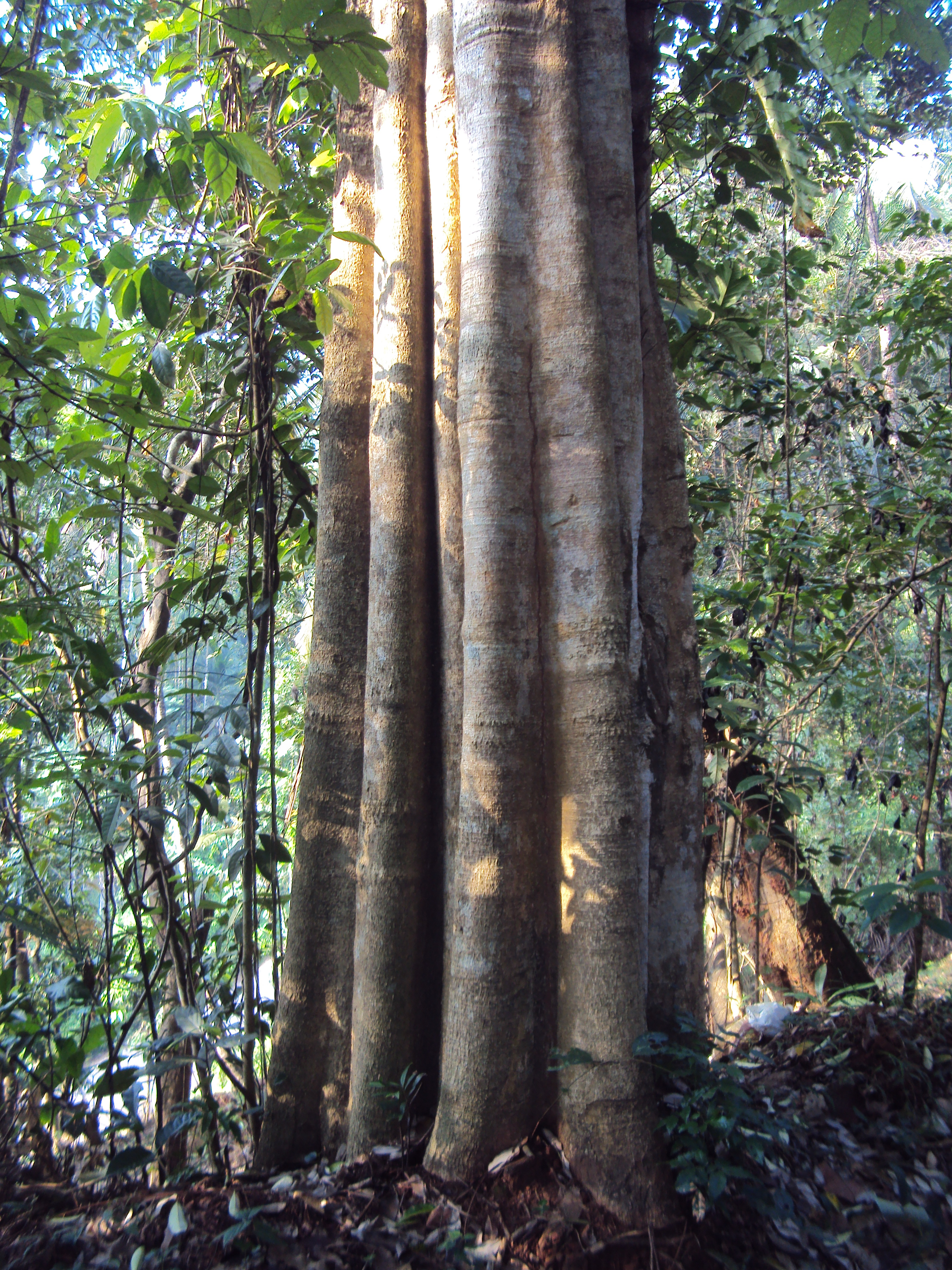
Trunk of a large tree

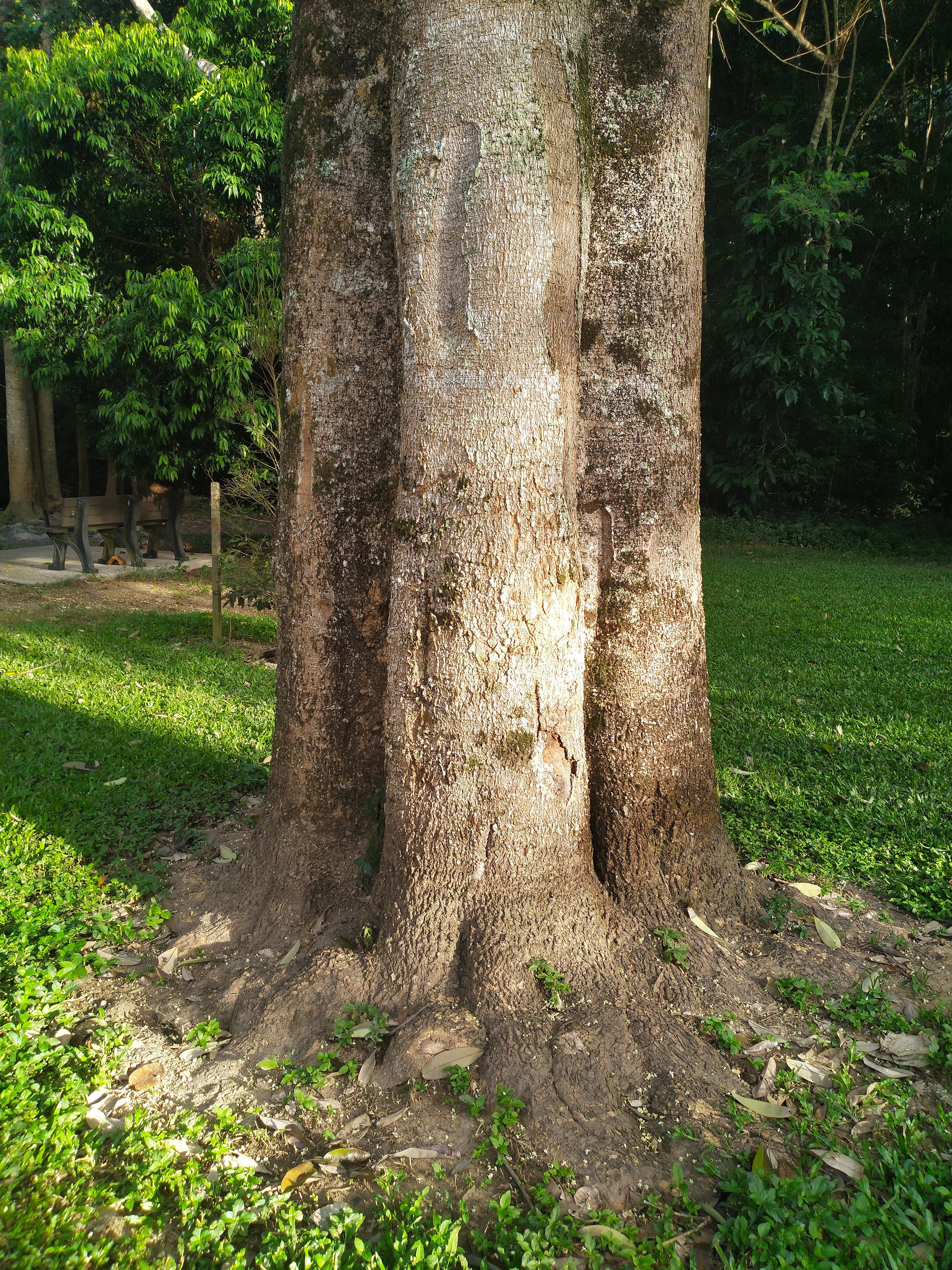
Fluted trunk

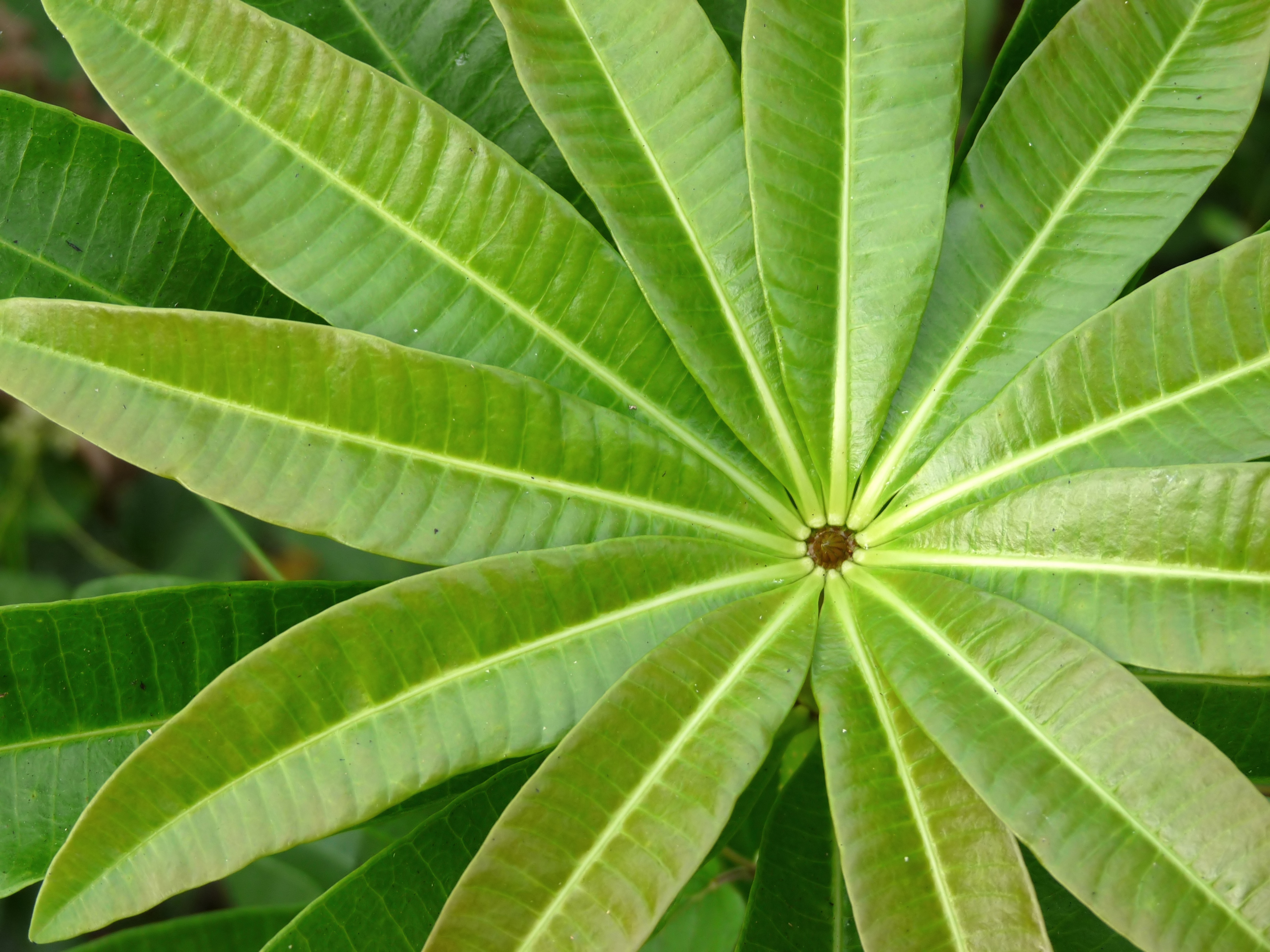
Arrangement of leaves

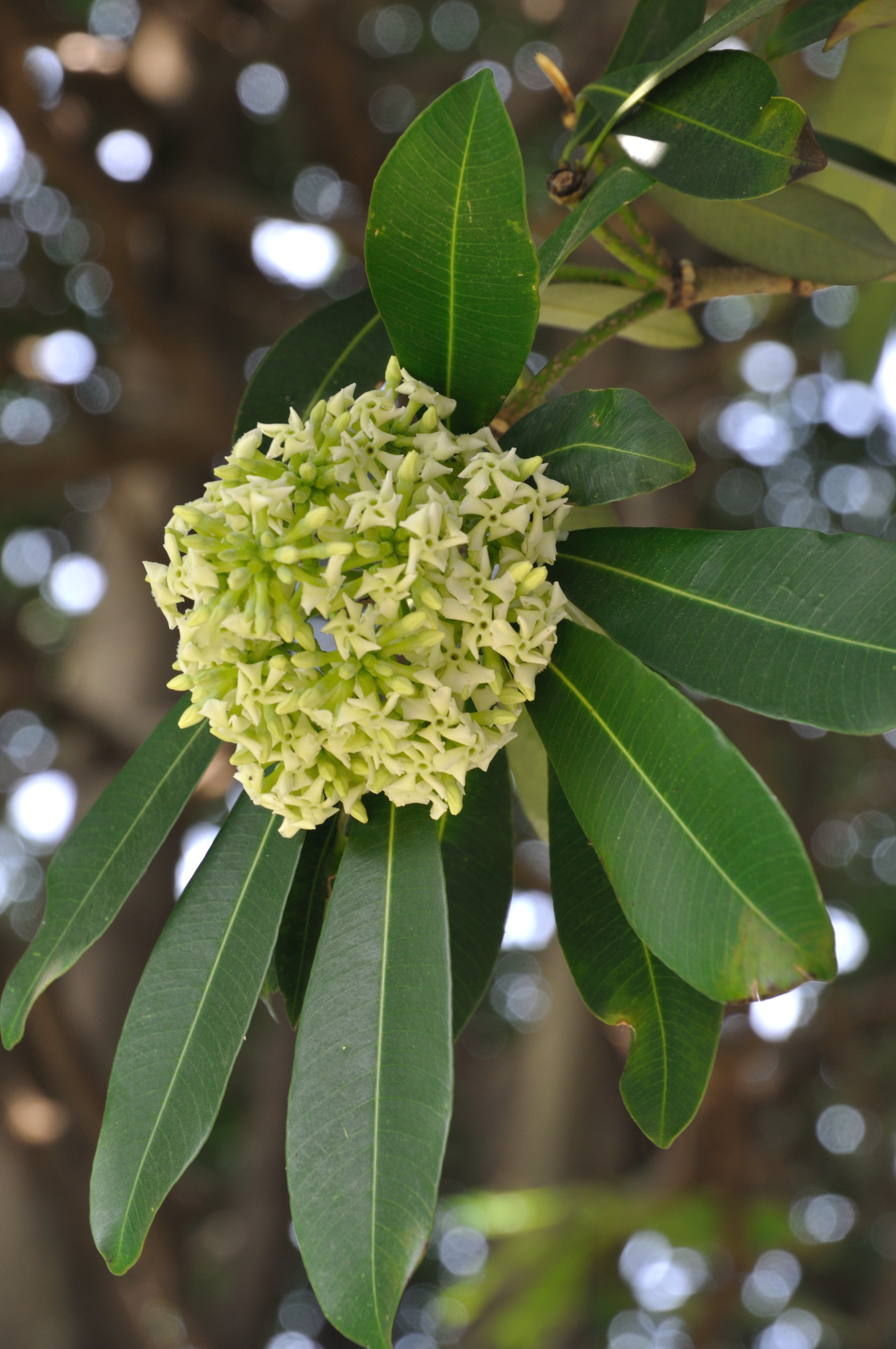
Flowers

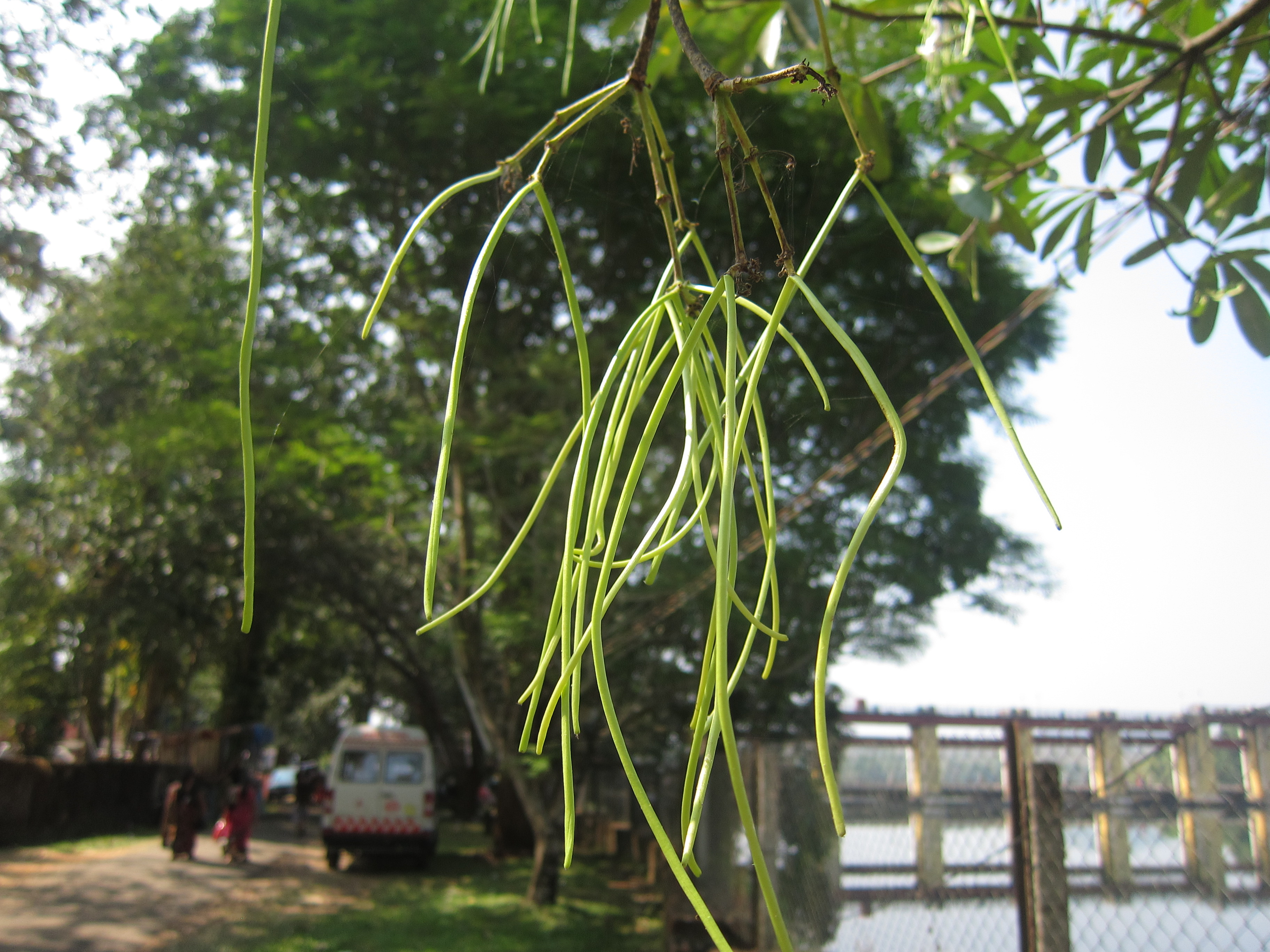
Fruit

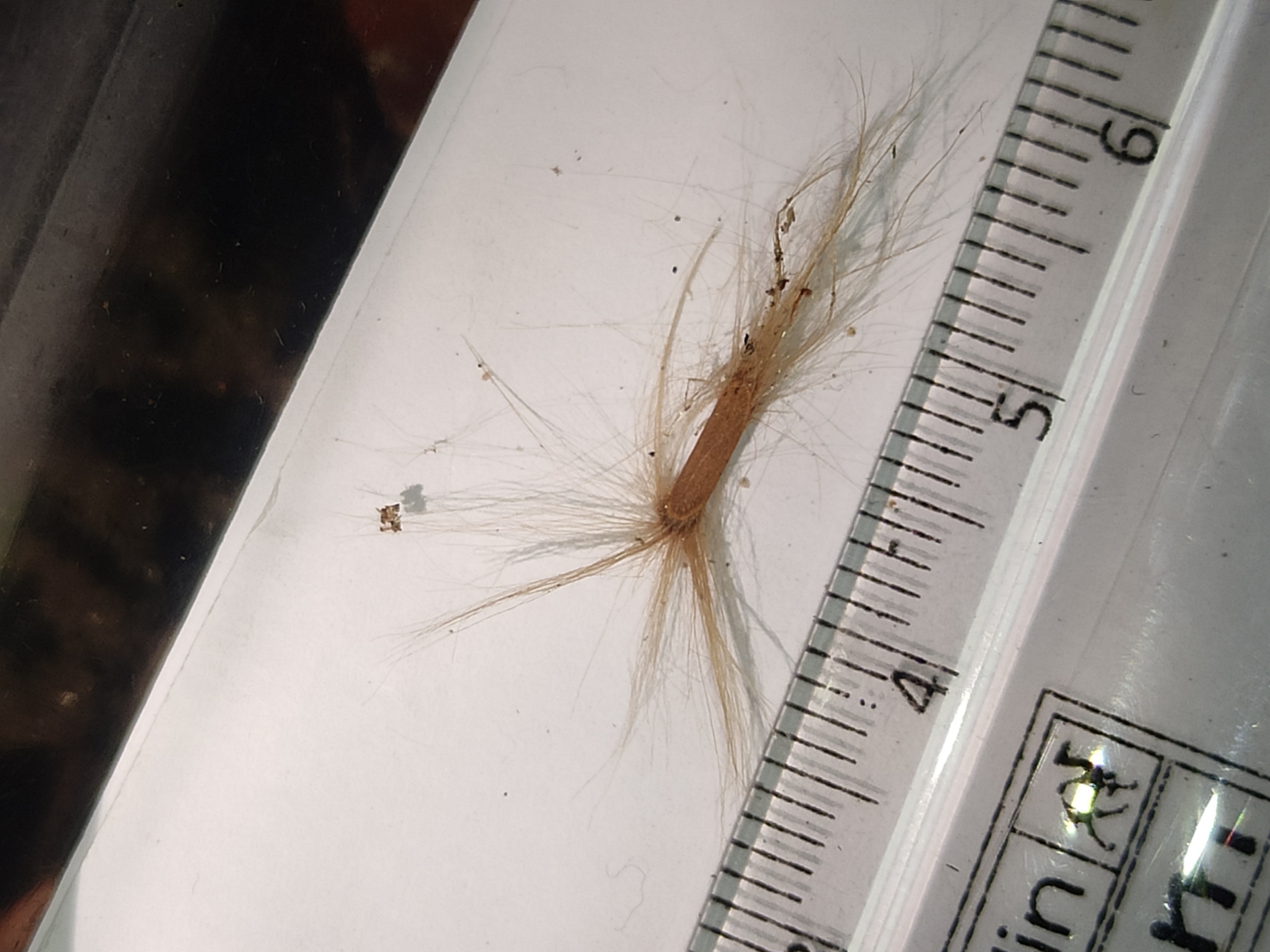
Seed

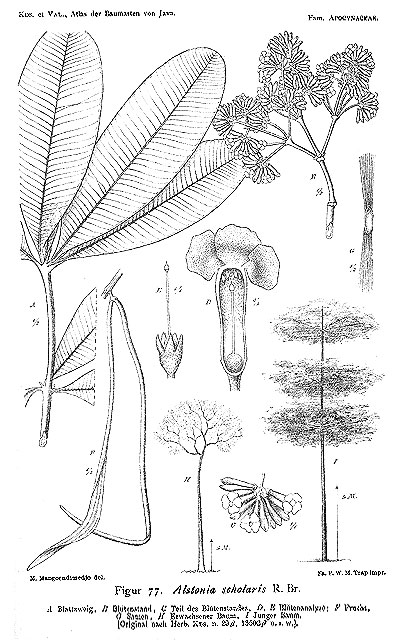
Botanical illustration
