= Strictamine =

Names
- IUPAC name methyl (10S,12R,13E,18S)-13-Ethylidene-8,15-diazapentacyclo[10.5.1.0^{1,9}.0^{2,7}.0^{10,15}]octadeca-2,4,6,8-tetraene-18-carboxylate
- Other names Desacetyldesformoakuammiline; Vincamidine

Identifiers
CAS Number	6475-05-4
3D model (JSmol)	Interactive image
ChemSpider	21270082
PubChem CID	6444325
UNII	S9UY998NY4
- InChI: InChI=1S/C20H22N2O2/c1-3-12-11-22-9-8-20-14-6-4-5-7-15(14)21-18(20)16(22)10-13(12)17(20)19(23)24-2/h3-7,13,16-17H,8-11H2,1-2H3/b12-3-/t13-,16-,17+,20?/m0/s1 Key: LITYYRLWHAQJQS-PHDDPKRUSA-N
- SMILES: C/C=C\1/CN2CCC34[C@H]([C@H]1C[C@H]2C3=NC5=CC=CC=C45)C(=O)OC

Properties
Chemical formula	C_{20}H_{22}N_{2}O_{2}
Molar mass	322.408 g·mol^{−1}
- Except where otherwise noted, data are given for materials in their standard state (at 25 °C [77 °F], 100 kPa). Infobox references

Strictamine is an alkaloid isolated from Alstonia scholaris.

Because of its unusual chemical structure, it has attracted research interest and several laboratory syntheses have been reported.
