= Oil Blue 35 =

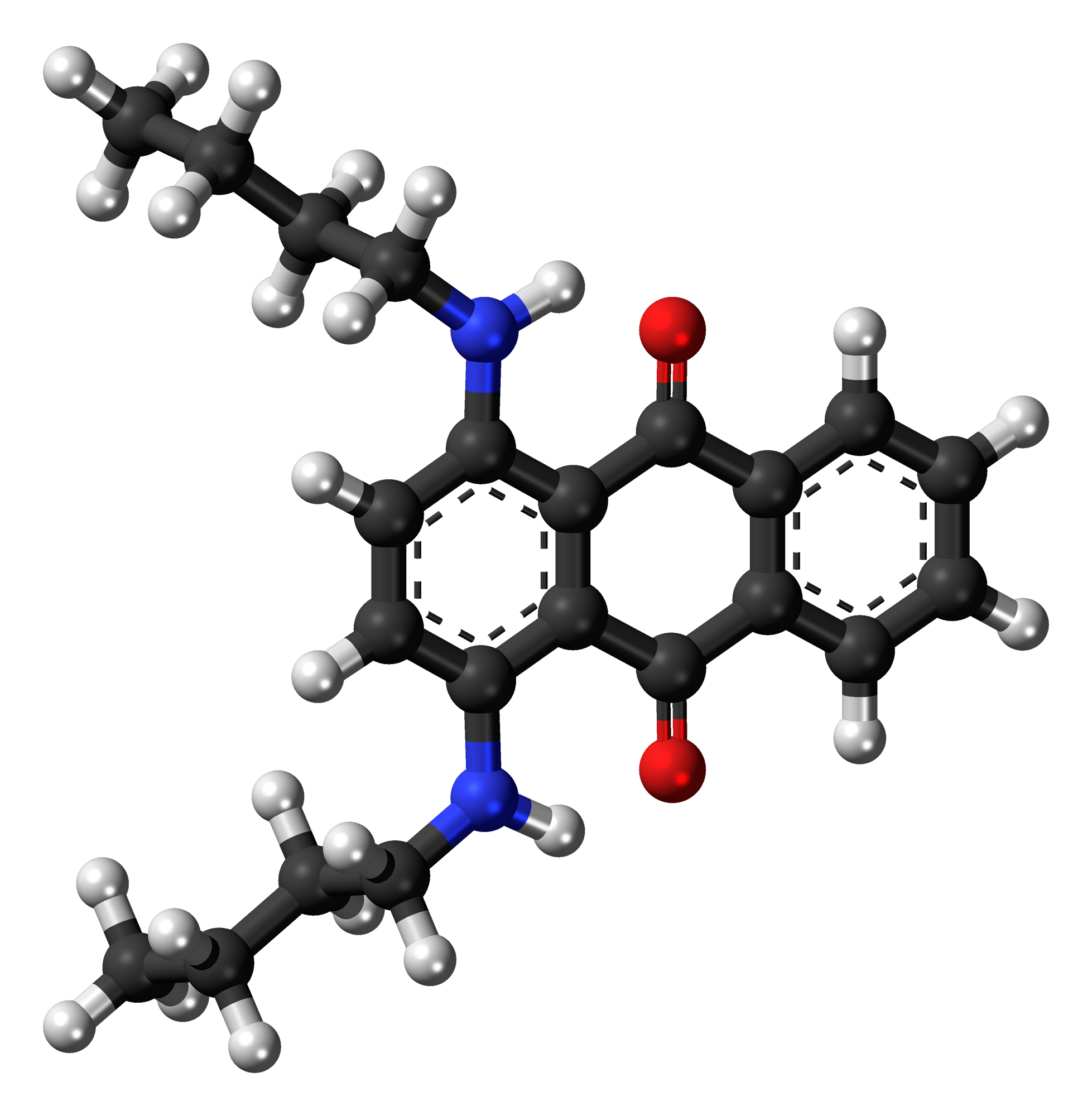

Names
- IUPAC name 1,4-Bis(butylamino)anthraquinone
- Preferred IUPAC name 1,4-Bis(butylamino)anthracene-9,10-dione
- Other names: Solvent Blue 35; Blue 2N; Blue B; Oil Blue B; CI 61554

Identifiers
| CAS Number | 17354-14-2 |
| 3D model (JSmol) | Interactive image |
| ChemSpider | 2994956 |
| ECHA InfoCard | 100.037.602 |
| EC Number | 241-379-4 |
| PubChem CID | 3766139 |
| UNII | ZVT4Q30OQY |
| CompTox Dashboard (EPA) | DTXSID5044605 |
- InChI: InChI=1S/C22H26N2O2/c1-3-5-13-23-17-11-12-18(24-14-6-4-2)20-19(17)21(25)15-9-7-8-10-16(15)22(20)26/h7-12,23-24H,3-6,13-14H2,1-2H3 Key: OCQDPIXQTSYZJL-UHFFFAOYSA-N; InChI=1/C22H26N2O2/c1-3-5-13-23-17-11-12-18(24-14-6-4-2)20-19(17)21(25)15-9-7-8-10-16(15)22(20)26/h7-12,23-24H,3-6,13-14H2,1-2H3 Key: OCQDPIXQTSYZJL-UHFFFAOYAW
- SMILES: O=C2c1ccccc1C(c3c2c(NCCCC)ccc3NCCCC)=O

Properties
| Chemical formula | C_{22}H_{26}N_{2}O_{2} |
| Molar mass | 350.462 g·mol^{−1} |
| Melting point | 104–105 °C (219–221 °F; 377–378 K) |
| Solubility in water | insoluble |
| Solubility | acetone, benzene, and toluene |
- Except where otherwise noted, data are given for materials in their standard state (at 25 °C [77 °F], 100 kPa). Infobox references

Oil Blue 35 is a blue anthraquinone dye used for colouring alcoholic and hydrocarbon based solvents, including oils, fats, and waxes. It is used also in lacquers and inks. In some countries, it is used as a fuel dye. It is also used in some blue colored smoke formulations. In microscopy, it is used as a staining dye. When exposed to 5% hydrochloric acid solution, it becomes dirty green.

== See also ==
- Oil Blue A
