= Oil Blue A =

- Skeletal formula

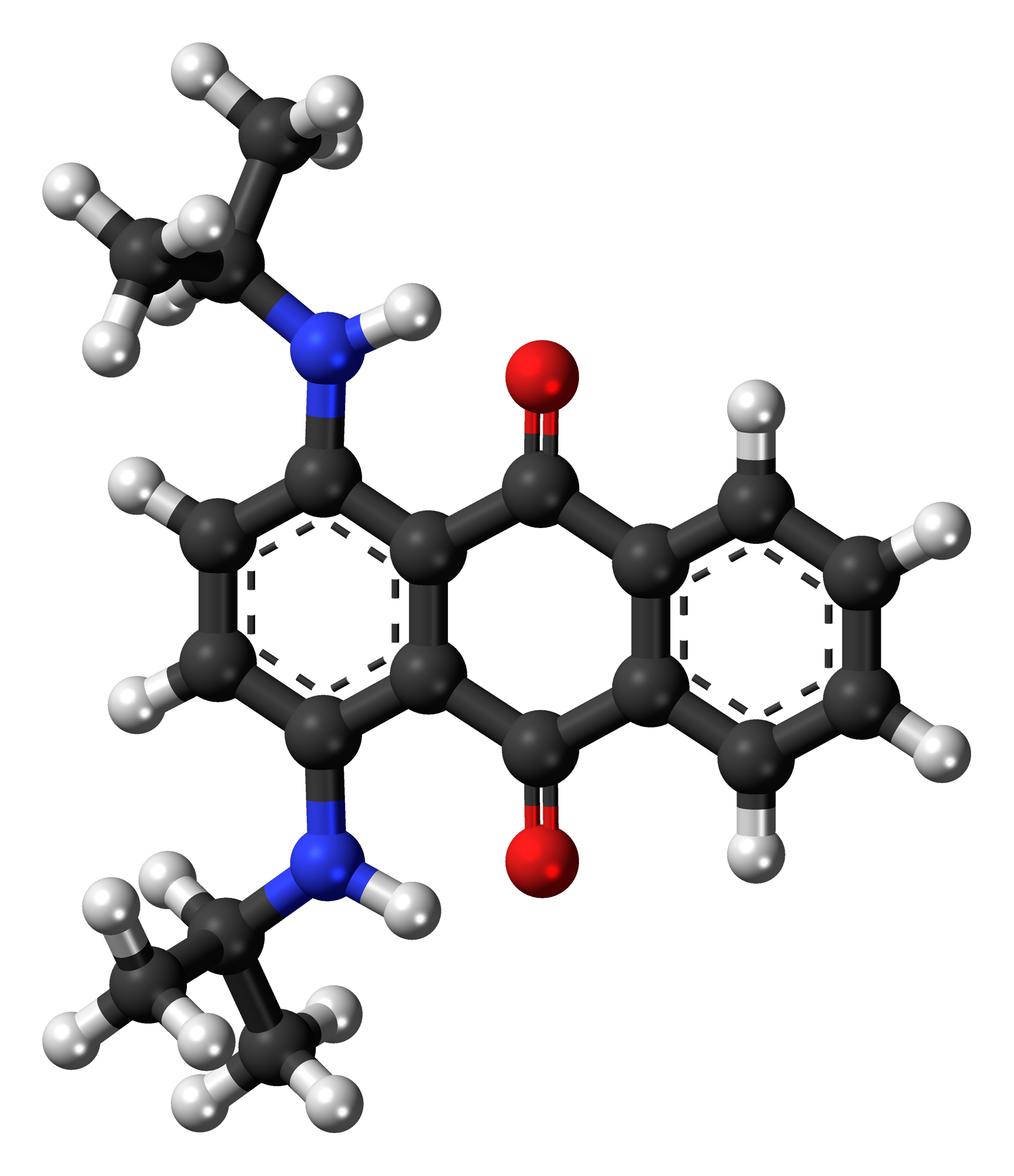
- Ball-and-stick model

Names
- Preferred IUPAC name 1,4-Bis[(propan-2-yl)amino]anthracene-9,10-dione
- Other names: Unisol Blue AS; Solvent Blue 36; Solvent Blue A; Oil Blue G; Blue AP; CI 61551

Identifiers
| CAS Number | 14233-37-5 |
| 3D model (JSmol) | Interactive image |
| ChemSpider | 55619 |
| ECHA InfoCard | 100.034.622 |
| EC Number | 238-101-9 |
| MeSH | C018468 |
| PubChem CID | 61719 |
| UNII | NEH7L3Y1P1 |
| CompTox Dashboard (EPA) | DTXSID2041250 |
- InChI: InChI=1S/C20H22N2O2/c1-11(2)21-15-9-10-16(22-12(3)4)18-17(15)19(23)13-7-5-6-8-14(13)20(18)24/h5-12,21-22H,1-4H3 Key: BLFZMXOCPASACY-UHFFFAOYSA-N; InChI=1/C20H22N2O2/c1-11(2)21-15-9-10-16(22-12(3)4)18-17(15)19(23)13-7-5-6-8-14(13)20(18)24/h5-12,21-22H,1-4H3 Key: BLFZMXOCPASACY-UHFFFAOYAP
- SMILES: O=C2c1ccccc1C(c3c2c(NC(C)C)ccc3NC(C)C)=O

Properties
| Chemical formula | C_{20}H_{22}N_{2}O_{2} |
| Molar mass | 322.408 g·mol^{−1} |
| Melting point | 133–135 °C (271–275 °F; 406–408 K) |
| Solubility in water | insoluble |
| Solubility | acetone, benzene, and toluene |
- Except where otherwise noted, data are given for materials in their standard state (at 25 °C [77 °F], 100 kPa). Infobox references

Oil Blue A is a blue anthraquinone dye used for colouring certain plastics such as polystyrene and acrylic resins, as well as other materials such as petroleum and inks. It has good resistance to light.

== See also ==
- Oil Blue 35
