= Stratos 714 =

American jet aircraft

General information
- Type: Very light jet
- National origin: United States
- Manufacturer: Stratos Aircraft
- Status: Under development
- Number built: 1

History
- First flight: 21 November 2016

The Stratos 714 is an American very light jet aircraft under development by Stratos Aircraft of Redmond, Oregon. The project was announced in July 2008, a prototype first flew on 21 November 2016, although Stratos currently lacks the funding to complete type certification. Predominantly made of carbon composite, the single turbofan aircraft would seat four to six at 400 kn (740 km/h) over up to 1,500 nmi (2,800 km).

== Development ==
Chief technology officer Carsten Sundin launched the VLJ project with CEO Michael Lemaire, aiming for higher speed and range than competitors. Sundin joined Lancair in 1993 after graduating and became engineering manager on the 240 kn (440 km/h) Lancair Legacy 2000. In 2003 he joined Epic Aircraft to become engineering manager on its new single turboprop and met the aerodynamicist of the Farnborough F1, Gordon Robinson. Farnborough Aircraft and Epic formed a joint venture to develop the smaller kit Epic LT along the FAR-23 certificated F1, sharing their wing, engine and tail, and Sundin Left Epic in 2005.

The project was unveiled on 16 July 2008, touted as an owner-flown Very Light Personal Jet. A cabin mock-up was shown at AirVenture in July 2009, and at that time the company predicted the jet would sell for about US$2M. The company was seeking US$12M to build two prototypes and a further US$100M to complete certification and commence production. The company CEO, Michael Lemaire, indicated in 2009 that the aircraft will fill a performance niche, as there is no other four seat aircraft with the 714's speed and range. The company was accepting refundable customer deposits of US$50,000 to be held in interest-bearing escrow in 2009. The first deposit was made by Cascade Air Charter, of Bend, Oregon in October 2009.

First flight of a proof of concept aircraft was achieved on 21 November 2016 before a public introduction at AirVenture in July 2017, with no firm schedule for certification. It is registered as N403KT.

In February 2017 prototype flight testing continued. The company did not have the funding to complete certification, and was no longer accepting deposits from customers. Stratos CEO Michael Lemaire indicated at that time, "we are privately funded for the prototype phase, during which we are planning to explore the full flight envelope and draw conclusions for the certification stage. We are not yet funded for the certification phase. At present, we have no plan to take deposits towards deliveries, which are still many years away." While investment is sufficient for an additional prototype and to finish flight testing, certification would need in the range of at least $200 million.

Stratos estimates type certification would need $100–150 million, but this could triple, and considers as an intermediate step selling aircraft kits needing a $200–400 thousand JT15D-5 with a few hundred hours before TBO. Production aircraft with a $900,000 PW535E are targeted for $3–3.5 million, 50% more than a Cirrus SF50 but competitive with $4.5-5 million twin very light jets with its 400 kn (740 km/h), 1,500 nmi (2,800 km) range, 600 lb (270 kg) full fuel payload and consuming only 1.16 lb/mi (0.33 kg/km) cruising at FL410, while used aircraft at this price have lower efficiency, dispatch reliability and inferior technology.

By July 2018, the 714 prototype had flown 185 flight hours, reaching 25,000 feet and 370 knots. The proof-of-concept aircraft had logged 250 hours by April 2019, and 330 hours by January 2020.

=== Stratos 716X ===
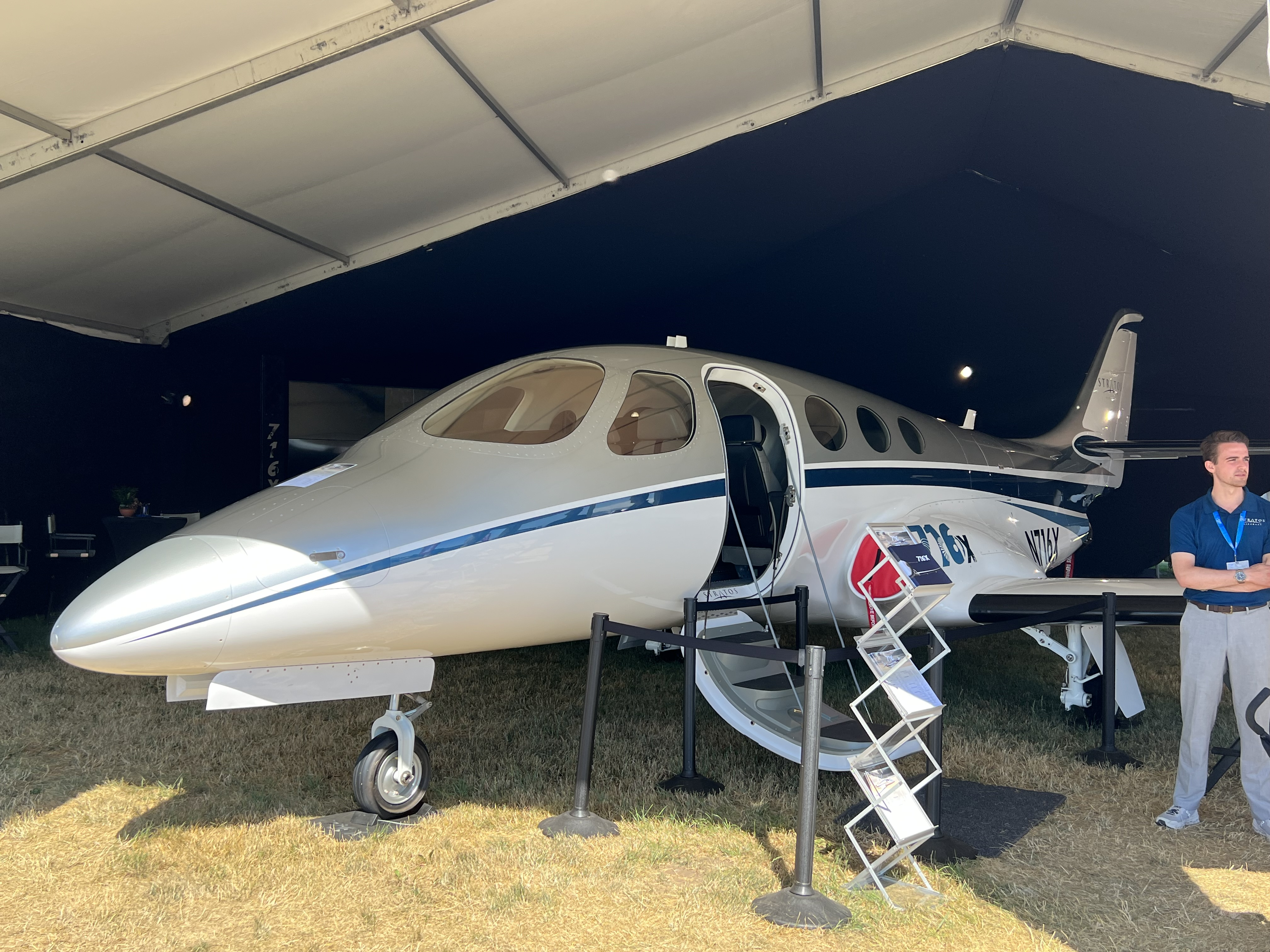
The 716X keeps the 714 general configuration but is stretched by 31 in (77.5 cm) to accommodate six seats

In May 2018, after 170 hours of test flying, Stratos decided to stretch the fuselage by 31 in (77.5 cm) to better accommodate six adults with bags. The aircraft was to be named and unveiled in the third quarter of 2018, with a first flight likely in 2019. Powered by a 3,000 lbf (13 kN) PWC JT15D-5 with single-lever control, The 716X was unveiled at the July 2018 EAA AirVenture, to be available as a kit in the fourth quarter with a stretched and 2 in (51 mm) wider fuselage than the 714. Before production of a certified version in four to five years, Stratos intends to sell three kits per year. The kits will each take 2,500 hours to build, in the same manner as an Epic LT single turboprop.

By April 2019, Stratos was building the fuselage for the first prototype. A full-scale cabin mock-up will be displayed at EAA AirVenture Oshkosh in July. A 3,400 lbf (15 kN) PW535 will propel the certificated version, featuring Garmin G3000 or G5000 avionics. By January 2020, load testing had been completed, while the first prototype was being assembled. The company intends to conduct high-speed taxi tests in the second quarter, with first flight forecast for the second half of 2020. The company intends to start taking orders once flight testing is under way. Stratos forecasts a production rate of 30 to 50 aircraft per year.

On July 2, 2020, the 716X made a 22 minute maiden flight from Redmond, Oregon, climbing to 13,500 ft and launching a flight-test program that will last several months.

== Design ==
The aircraft design features a cantilever low-wing with winglets, a cruciform tail and retractable tricycle landing gear.

The original four seater has an 11.5 ft (3.5 m) long, 170 cu ft (4.8 m^{3}) cabin, but following aircraft will be larger, with six seats. The airframe is built from Toray pre-preg carbon composites and nomex honeycomb sandwich, except the aft-center section, a fairing-covered moly steel cage supporting the turbofan for damage tolerance, in case of an uncontained engine failure. The 198 sq ft (18.4 m^{2}) wing has a thickness ratio of 14-16.5%, to allow for the main landing gear and 196 US gal (740 L; 163 imp gal) of fuel per side (2,553 lb (1,158 kg) total), double-slotted flaps and the supercritical airfoil maintains laminar flow on 50-55% of the upper surface. The engine is in-line with the center of mass to avoid thrust-pitch coupling. It employs a fuselage-top mount, its intakes outside the boundary layer.

The aircraft is flown by sidesticks like Lancair aircraft or the Cessna TTx. The first prototype has an experimental Electronic International/Garmin flight deck, but production aircraft will have a Garmin G3000 cockpit. The 8.33 psi (57.4 kPa) pressurization provides a 8,000 ft (2,400 m) cabin altitude at its FL410 ceiling. The leading edge deicing boots allow flying in icing conditions. The prototype is powered by a single 2,900 lbf (13 kN) JT15D-5 taken from a Beechjet, but production versions will use a 3,360 lbf (14.9 kN) PW535E for 22-27% more high altitude thrust and 15% better TSFC.

== Specifications ==
Data from Stratos.

General characteristics

- Crew: one
- Capacity: 3-5 passengers
- Length: 35 ft 10 in (10.91 m)
- Wingspan: 40 ft 6 in (12.34 m)
- Height: 11 ft 5 in (3.48 m)
- Wing area: 198 sq ft (18.4 m^{2})
- Airfoil: supercritical, 14-16.5% thickness ratio
- Empty weight: 5,035 lb (2,284 kg) including 200 lb (91 kg) pilot
- Gross weight: 6,261 lb (2,840 kg) Max. zero fuel
- Max takeoff weight: 8,421 lb (3,820 kg)
- Fuel capacity: 2,619 lb (1,188 kg)
- Powerplant: 1 × Pratt & Whitney Canada PW535E turbofan, 3,360 lbf (14.9 kN) thrust

Performance

- Maximum speed: 402 kn (462 mph, 744 km/h) High Speed cruise
- Cruise speed: 320 kn (370 mph, 590 km/h) Long range cruise
- Range: 1,178 nmi (1,356 mi, 2,182 km) Max payload
- Ferry range: 1,777 nmi (2,045 mi, 3,291 km)
- Service ceiling: 41,000 ft (12,000 m)
- Time to altitude: 17 minutes to FL370
- Wing loading: 43 lb/sq ft (210 kg/m^{2})
- Fuel consumption: 4.0–3.7 lb/mi (1.12–1.05 kg/km)
- Thrust/weight: 0.403
- Takeoff: 2,090 ft (637 m) [SL, ISA, MTOW]
- Landing: 1,510 ft (460 m)

== See also ==
Related lists

- List of very light jets
