= General Electric Catalyst =

Turboprop engine model

Catalyst
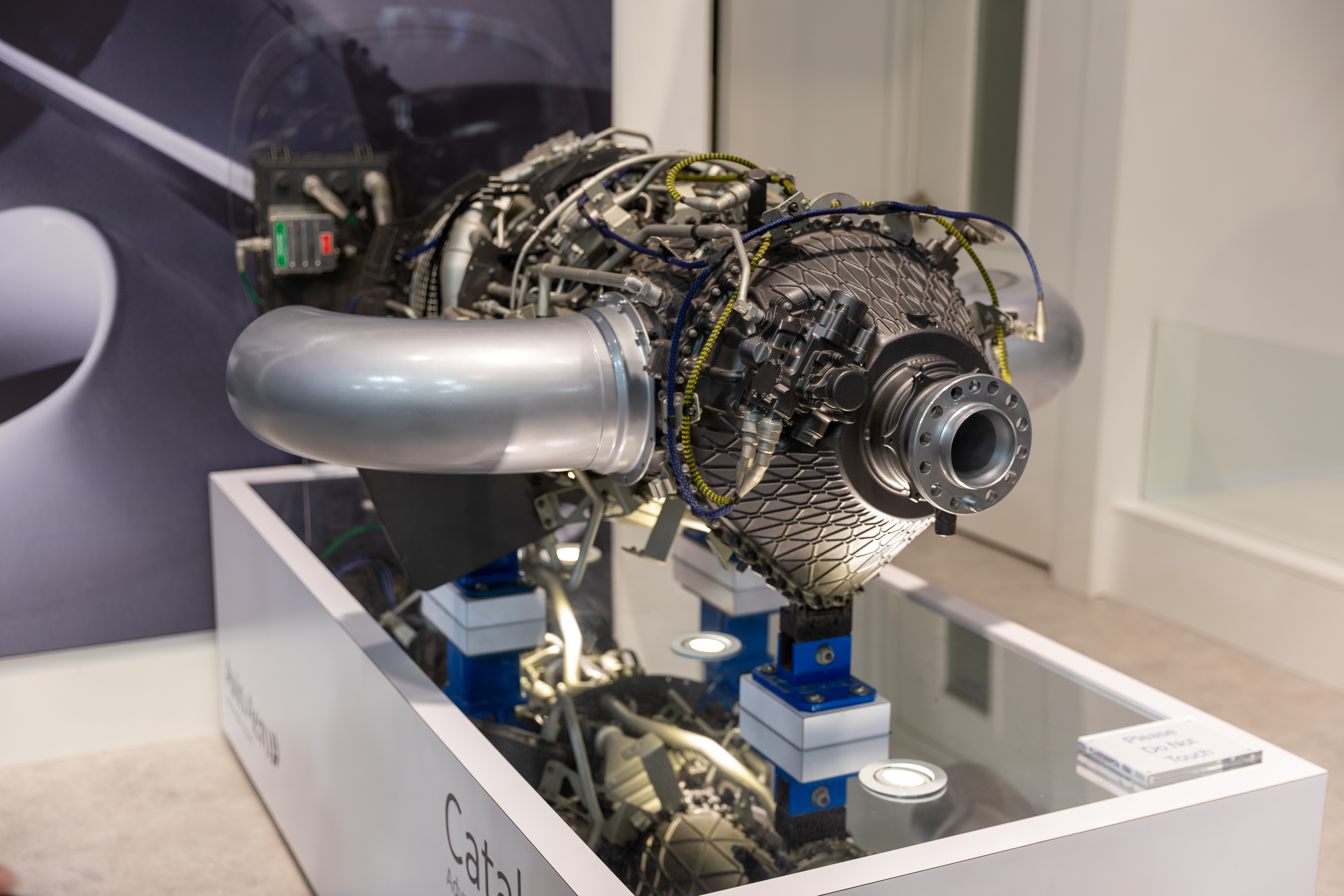
- Type: Turboprop
- National origin: Italy
- Manufacturer: Avio Aero (GE Aerospace subsidiary)
- First run: December 22, 2017
- Major applications: Eurodrone; Beechcraft Denali; XTI TriFan 600

The General Electric Catalyst (formerly Advanced Turboprop, or ATP) is a turboprop engine by GE Aerospace. It was announced on November 16, 2015, first ran on December 22, 2017, and was certificated by the Federal Aviation Administration in February 2025. The 850 to 1,600 hp (630 to 1,190 kW) engine is designed for 20% better fuel efficiency than competing engines, through a 16:1 overall pressure ratio, variable stator vanes, cooled turbine blades, 3D printed parts and FADEC. It powers the Beechcraft Denali.

== Development ==
After introducing the General Electric H80 in 2010 to improve the Walter M601, GE analyzed its competition and devised a clean-sheet design in 2014, which was then selected for the Cessna Denali competition. In September 2015, General Electric created a European turboprop development center, following the US-Exim Bank closure that June, investing over $400 million and creating 500 to 1,000 jobs. The engine was announced on November 16, 2015 at the National Business Aviation Association's annual tradeshow.

In 2016, the gearbox, power turbine and combustor were to be made in Turin, the rotating components were to be supplied from Warsaw and the final assembly line was planned at Walter Engines in Prague. At the time, major components were split between GE-owned facilities in Poland and Italy, both belonging to Avio Aero. Avio Aero had been acquired by GE in 2013. By 2021, the Avio Aero website no longer listed a facility in Warsaw. The engine was designed by GE in Europe, with the power and gas generator turbines and the high pressure compressor handled by the Engineering Design Center in Warsaw, an alliance between General Electric Company Polska and the Warsaw Institute of Aviation.

By October 2017, GE had received 85% of the parts and was on track to deliver the first test engine by the end of the year. At that time, the axial-centrifugal compressor vehicle — stator, rotor and cold-section assemblies — was tested in Munich to validate its efficiency, performance and operability.

=== Testing ===
After two years of development, the engine completed its first test run in Prague on December 22, 2017. With most components tested and the engine running, GE Aviation said it was meeting its performance objectives and hoped to exceed them. Certification testing was to begin in 2018, validating the aerodynamics, mechanics, and aerothermal systems. The engine was then expected to power the Beechcraft Denali's first flight in late 2018 and to complete over 2,000 hours of testing before the Denali entered service. GE Aviation Czech, the development, testing and production headquarters, had recruited around 180 employees, with another 80 expected in 2018 among 500 more planned for the complete facility at full production rate. The engine was developed over two years by 400 GE designers, engineers and materials experts in the Czech Republic, Italy, Germany, Poland, the U.S. and elsewhere. Six test cells were to open and 10 test engines were to be built, with flight testing on a flying testbed planned for later in 2018; certification tests over 2018–2019 were to include altitude, performance and high-vibration testing.

By March 2018, the first engine had run nearly 40 hours, ahead of a health monitoring review planned to span several years. The next engine had been assembled and instrumented for altitude trials, to be tested in Canada from the summer of 2018. From later in 2018, Cessna was to receive three engines in preparation for a Denali maiden flight in the first quarter of 2019. GE expected development to run 30% faster than its previous new engine projects, as the development program had 10 engines plus several rebuilds. Over the following two years, 33 engine tests were planned, including 17 certification tests. Certification did not require a flying testbed, but a modified King Air 350 might be used for flight safety clearance early in 2019, ahead of Denali flight tests. At the end of May 2018, 60 hours of testing had been completed, including runs at full power, while assembly of the second engine was nearly complete for a first run that summer; component certification was imminent and was to be followed by whole-engine certification testing, starting with ingestion and altitude tests. By July 2018, the first engine had run over 100 hours while a second engine was running in Prague, before being sent to Canada later in the year for altitude testing; performance was on target or better than predicted.

By May 2019, test engines had run up to 41,000 ft (12,000 m) in an altitude chamber and for over 1,000 h, simulating three years of operations, while the FADEC had run 300 h in the Denali iron bird. By October 2019, over 1,000 engine cycles had logged 1,600 h of tests: 1,200 h in test cells and 400 h in compressor rigs. Altitude, endurance, vibration, durability and ingestion testing were complete, as were integrated propeller controls tests and high-pressure compressor and gas generator turbine overspeed tests. New icing test requirements pushed the first engine delivery back to 2020, and the Beechcraft Denali's first flight further still. Five engines had been assembled by then, with two more due for completion before the end of 2019. First flight testing aboard a King Air was delayed until the spring of 2020, and certification until the autumn of 2021 following an 18-month campaign, because of new FAA testing requirements including icing tests.

By July 2021, 16 engines had been produced and had completed 2,500 h of operation, and 30% of the Catalyst's certification tests were complete, including some icing tests. Testing showed more power at high altitudes than expected and 1–2% better efficiency than anticipated, for up to 16–17% more than competing engines. One turboprop was fitted to a Beechcraft King Air 350 in Berlin, which completed taxi tests ahead of a maiden flight expected within months and certification then targeted for the end of 2022. Another engine was installed on a Denali airframe for a first flight before the end of the year, with certification then targeted for 2023.

The Catalyst made its first flight on a King Air testbed on September 30, 2021, in the hands of BBA chief test pilot Sigismond Monnet and lead flight test engineer Alessandro Ramazzotti. On November 22, the Denali made its first flight with a Catalyst engine, targeting certification in 2025. In May 2023, Denali certification was pushed back to 2025 as the engine's certification slipped to 2024 under more stringent standards for icing and engine ingestion; by then 16 of 22 planned engine certification tests and 26 of 37 component certification tests had been completed, along with hot-weather and cold-temperature trials.

In February 2025, the Federal Aviation Administration granted certification after more than 8,000 h of tests, clearing the way for the Denali's planned 2026 introduction; the three prototypes had by then gathered over 2,700 flight hours in 1,100 flights.

=== Market ===
The GE Catalyst covers the market between the sub-850-horsepower (630 kW) General Electric H80 and the CT7. It was designed to compete with the Pratt & Whitney Canada PT6, which at the Catalyst's launch had led the small turboprop market for 50 years with over 51,000 units produced. The Catalyst was selected to power the Beechcraft Denali single-engine turboprop, seating up to 12 passengers at over 280 knots (520 km/h) for 1,500 nautical miles (2,800 km). GE planned to invest up to $1 billion in the project, including $400 million for a manufacturing center in Europe.

== Design ==
The 1,300-shaft-horsepower (970 kW) Advanced Turboprop can be extended across an 850–1,600 horsepower (630–1,190 kW) range. Its 16:1 overall pressure ratio allows a 20% lower fuel burn and 10% higher cruise power than same-size-class competitors, with a 4,000–6,000 hour mean time between overhauls (MTBO). The compressor is derived from the General Electric T700, with four axial stages and a single centrifugal stage, using the same 3D aerodynamic design as the GE9X. The engine includes variable stator vanes (VSVs) and 3D printed parts.

The reverse-flow single-annular combustor resembles the GE-Honda HF120 design. The two-stage single-crystal high pressure turbine is the first in this class of engine to be fully cooled. The three-stage low-pressure turbine is contra-rotating. A FADEC integrated propulsion control system governs both engine and propeller pitch as a single system.

Twelve 3D-printed parts replace 855 conventional parts: frames, combustor liners, sumps, exhaust case, bearing housings, stationary components in the flowpath, and heat exchangers. Overall weight is reduced by 5% and brake specific fuel consumption is improved by 1%. 3D printing is not used for rotating components such as blades, discs and rotors. Some 35% of the engine is printed at GE, reducing the serialized part count to 35. The printed parts are made from a titanium alloy.

The time between overhauls is 4,000 hours, 33% more than its leading competitor. It is the first turboprop in its class with two stages of variable stator vanes. It features a composite, five-bladed propeller system from McCauley, a subsidiary of Textron.

Turboprops must be certificated for high-altitude ice crystal icing, which requires a compressor blisk to survive an impact from an ice ball. Meeting this by structural means would have required a 2 lb (0.91 kg) heavier first stage and would have hampered the engine's aerodynamics. GE instead proposed channelling hot oil from an accessory gearbox sump to the engine inlet to prevent ice buildup, and planned to test this at a Canadian cold weather facility in the summer of 2018.

Cooled turbines allow over 150 °C (300 °F) higher operating temperatures. Its FADEC, VSVs and three-stage counter-rotating LP turbine generate 10% higher cruise power, maintaining peak efficiency at off-design conditions for better lapse rate and altitude power. The one-piece sump replaces 45 conventional parts and is printed in four days, down from 14 initially.

== Applications ==
- Beechcraft Denali
- Eurodrone
- XTI TriFan 600

== Specifications ==
==== General characteristics ====
- Type: Turboprop
- Length: 71.6 in (1,820 mm)
- Diameter: 20.00–20.13 in (508–511 mm)
- Dry weight: 639.7 lb (290.2 kg)

==== Components ====
- Compressor: four axial stages and a single centrifugal stage
- Combustors: reverse flow single-annular combustor
- Turbine: two-stage high pressure, three-stage low-pressure

==== Performance ====
- Maximum power output: 1,300 hp (970 kW) (850–1,600 hp (630–1,190 kW) range)
- Overall pressure ratio: 16:1
- Specific fuel consumption: Less than 0.5 lb/(hp⋅h) (0.30 kg/kWh)
- Power-to-weight ratio: 2.03 shp/lb (3.34 kW/kg)
- Time between overhauls (TBO): 4000-6000 hours
- Core engine speed: 44,550 rpm
- Power turbine rotor: 23,533 rpm
- Propeller: 1,700 rpm

== See also ==
Related development

- General Electric T700

Comparable engines

- Pratt & Whitney Canada PT6
- Garrett TPE331

Related lists

- List of aircraft engines
