= FCGS =

FCGS may refer to:

- Al-Fateh Center for Gifted Students, now the Libya Center for Gifted Students, in Benghazi, Libya
- Fulham Cross Girls School, in London

== See also ==
- FCG (disambiguation)
