= CAIGA Primus 150 =

Single engine turboprop aircraft by AVIC

Leadair AG300
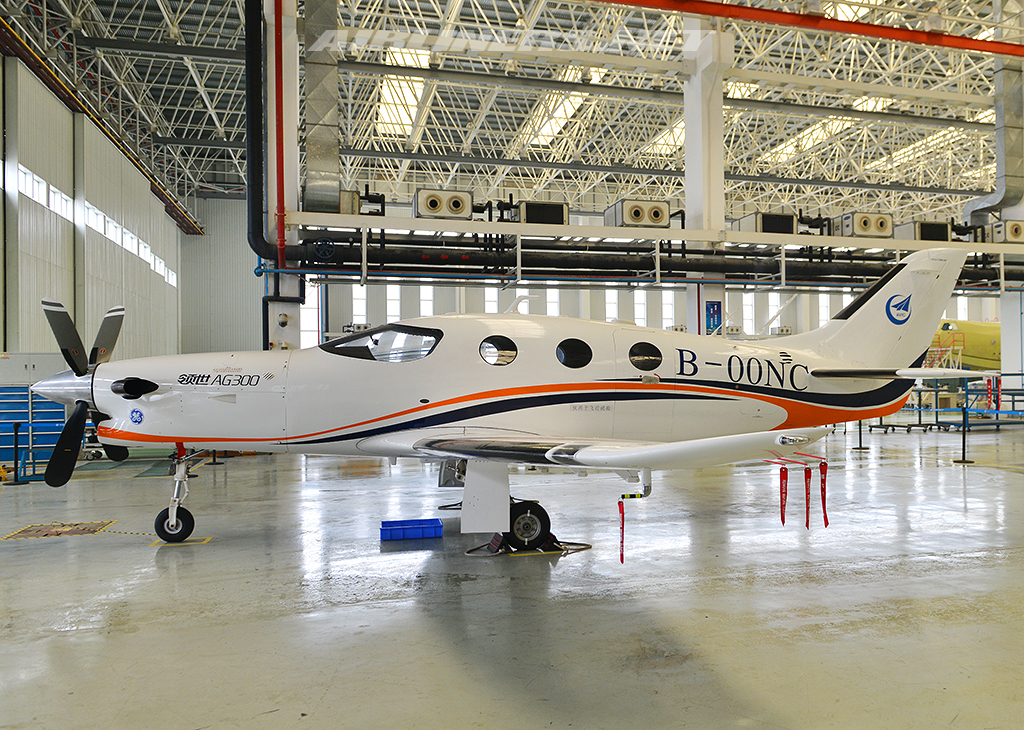
- An AVIC Leadair AG300 at Zhuhai Jinwan Airport

General information
- Type: Single engine turboprop
- National origin: China
- Manufacturer: China Aviation Industry General Aircraft
- Status: In development

History
- First flight: 5 July 2014
- Developed from: Epic LT

The AVIC Leadair AG300, previously called Primus 150, built by the China Aviation Industry General Aircraft, is a development of the Epic LT aircraft built using the international rights to Epic Aircraft bought in bankruptcy in 2010. As part of the settlement, Epic retained its rights for American construction and support of its aircraft, creating two divergent lines.

== Design and development ==
China Aviation Industry General Aircraft (CAIGA) began the process of developing the Epic LT into the Primus 150 for commercial construction, with program first started in November 2011. Its maiden flight was successfully completed on July 5, 2014, and Chinese state certification was received in the following year. Three enterprises have signed letters of intent to purchase the aircraft at a unit price of two million US dollars, under the new name Leadair AG300. The general designer is Mr. Xiong Xianpeng (熊贤鹏). Currently, Leadair AG300 is the fastest flying single-engine, propeller driven general aviation aircraft in China. The aircraft is a five-seat low-wing tricycle-gear pressurized turboprop.

== Specifications (Primus 150) ==
Data from Aviation Week

General characteristics

- Capacity: five-seat
- Powerplant: 1 × General Electric H85 Turboprop, 630 kW (850 hp)
- Propellers: four-bladed

Performance

- Cruise speed: 600 km/h (373 mph, 324 kn)
- Range: 2,500 km (1,550 mi, 1,350 nmi)

== See also ==
Related development

- Epic LT

Aircraft of comparable role, configuration, and era

- Aero Ae 270 Spirit
- Beechcraft Denali
- Myasishchev M-101T
- Pilatus PC-12
- Piper Meridian
- SOCATA TBM
