= Flight Consulting Group =

Latvian business aviation holding company

- Founded: July 21, 2000
- Founders: Roman Starkov, Leonid Gorodnitski
- Headquarters: Riga, Latvia
- Services: business aviation
- Number of employees: 100+
- Website: www.fcg.aero

Flight Consulting Group is an operational holding company based in Riga, Latvia (EU). Flight Consulting Group provides flight support, business jet ground handling, organising private charters, buying and selling aircraft, and aviation consulting. It also has a Certified Dispatch Centers in Europe.

== Structure ==
Flight Consulting Group’s subsidiary companies include:

FBO RIGA – a certified ground handling provider and operator of business aviation center in Riga International Airport. Currently, the company is using the airport’s VIP centre for servicing passengers and crews. The opening of the new FBO RIGA Business Aviation Centre took place in September 2015.

FCG Ops – a certified 24/7 flight operations control center. FCG Ops provides dispatch centre services for planning, coordination, and control of flights to air carriers, business aviation operators, plane owners, and state organisations.

Jet Travel – an IATA-certified travel agency, which specialises in providing services for flight crews and corporate customers.

BBAC (Baltic Business Aviation Center) – the group's VIP charter division, offering private, group, sports, and cargo charter flights worldwide.

FCG Aviation Development – a department dealing with engineering design and business aviation infrastructure development.

The holding is also the developer of the Air Traffic Order Management (ATOM) software, which incorporates the functionalities of ERP (enterprise resource planning), CRM (customer relationship management), flight management, reporting and business analytics.

== History ==
2000 – Flight Consulting Group was founded on 21 July by Roman Starkov and Leonid Gorodnitski in Riga, Latvia. The company began offering international flight support and charter flight management, servicing operators across the Baltics and Germany.

2001 – The company concluded a contract with the Riga International Airport and started providing services in handling the airport’s non-scheduled flights.

2002 – The first around-the-world flight with the Hawker 800 plane was managed. The company was servicing nearly 10 airline companies from different countries on a permanent basis. An international tender was won and an order was received to service a charter programme for 350 flights to Spain with the Il 86 airplane.

2005 – The number of flights handled and services by the company exceeded 20,000. The same year, Baltic Business Aviation Center (BBAC) was established to handle private jet chartering, aircraft sales, and management services.

2007 – The company began providing consulting services in the business aviation area.

2009 – The ground handling business at Riga Airport was transferred to a separate company, FBO RIGA. FBO RIGA opened a business aviation support complex, the first in the Baltics.

FCG Holding invited Lufthansa Bombardier Aviation Service Company to Riga and signed a contract for the opening of a technical maintenance station.

2011 – The number of planes serviced on a permanent basis came close to 70. The company created a service network in the Baltic States, Belarus, and Kaliningrad.

2012 – FCG Aviation Development Company was established and won the right to build a new business aviation complex at Riga Airport in an open tender.

2013 – The FBO Riga Complex design was approved and construction began.

2014 – The modernization of the holding’s automated work system was singled out into a separate direction, and a software was developed to integrate the functionality of ERP, CRM, flight management, reporting and business analytics – АТОМ (Air Traffic Operation Management).

2015 – The opening of the new complex took place on September 8, 2015.

== Certificates & Membership ==
Flight Consulting Group is a certified Flight Support Center and Ground Handling Agent at RIX and holds an ISO 9001 Compliance Certificate.

Companies that are a part of Flight Consulting Group hold memberships in different industry associations:

• European Business Aviation Association

• International Air Transport Association

• International Civil Aviation Organization

• National Business Aviation Association

• Russian United Business Aviation Association

== Services ==
Flight Consulting Group, along with its subsidiary companies, offers solutions for the following:

• Flight planning and support;

• Aviation consulting;

• Buying and selling aircraft and managing the business aviation planes;

• Ground handling of the aircraft;

• Implementation of infrastructure projects in the business aviation area;

• Development of software for OCCs, FBOs, and their customers.
