= FBO RIGA =

Company based in Riga, Latvia

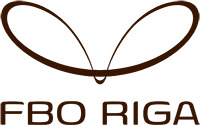
- Founded: 2000
- Headquarters: Riga, Latvia
- Key people: Roman Starkov (co-owner) Leonid Gorodnitski (co-owner)
- Services: business aviation
- Website: www.fcg.aero/fbo-riga

FBO RIGA is a certified ground handling agent and the operator of the business aviation center at the Riga International Airport. The opening of the new FBO RIGA Business Aviation Center took place in September 2015. The new FBO RIGA complex includes a business aviation terminal with an adjacent car park, a heated hangar, an apron with parking stands for business jets, and a helipad.

== History ==
In 2006 Flight Consulting Group purchased a building at Riga Airport to launch its FBO Project (Fixed Base Operator), consisting of a hangar and a business aviation terminal.

In 2009 the ground handling business at Riga Airport was transferred to a separate company, FBO RIGA. The latter is the owner of the infrastructure that contains the FBO and the dedicated business aviation hangar.

The official opening ceremony of the first purpose built business aviation hangar in The Baltic states and Scandinavia took place on Thursday 22 April 2010 at Riga airport. The hangar became the only one of this kind in the Baltic and Scandinavian countries.

During the first year of FBO RIGA operational work 20 foreign business jets were base parked in Riga.

In September 2010 a new aircraft maintenance station Lufthansa Bombardier Aviation GmbH (LBAS) opened an LMF for Learjet, Challenger and Global aircraft at Riga International Airport in Latvia and started its operational work within FBO RIGA facilities. Riga Airport for the first time in its history appeared in the busiest business airport TOP 25 in 2010.

In 2012 FCG Aviation Development Company was established and won the right to build a new business aviation complex at Riga Airport in an open tender. Design of the new FBO RIGA complex began in that the same year. The FBO RIGA Complex design was approved in 2013 and construction started.

A new FBO RIGA business aviation center at Riga International Airport opened in September 2015.

== Services ==
FBO RIGA offers the services for operators and passengers in Riga, such as aircraft fuelling, aircraft de/anti-icing, overnight aircraft hangarage, passenger and crew handling, including customs and immigration services.
