= Beechcraft Denali =

Single engine turboprop airplane by Textron Aviation, 2021

Denali
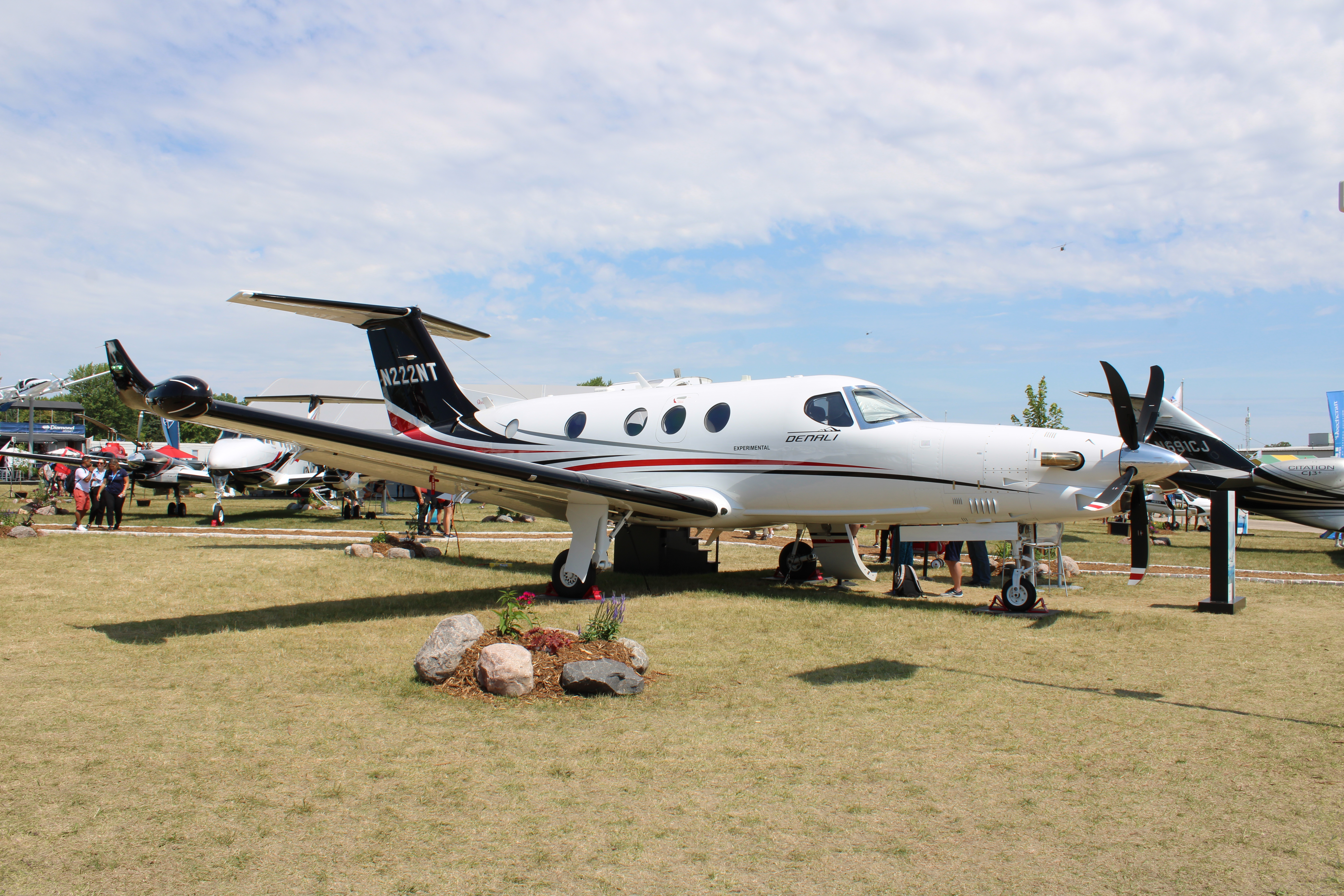
- Beechcraft Denali at 2023 EAA AirVenture Oshkosh

General information
- Type: Turboprop aircraft
- National origin: United States
- Manufacturer: Textron Aviation
- Status: Under development
- Number built: 2

History
- First flight: November 23, 2021

The Beechcraft Denali, also known as the Model 220 and previously the Cessna Denali and Textron "Single Engine Turboprop" (SETP), is an American single engine turboprop aircraft under development by Textron Aviation. Announced at EAA AirVenture Oshkosh 2015, the aircraft is a completely new design, not derived from any existing aircraft. It should compete primarily with the nine-passenger Pilatus PC-12, and to some extent with smaller five-to-six passenger single-engine turboprops such as the Epic E1000, Piper M700 Fury, and SOCATA TBM.

== Development ==
In November 2015, GE Aerospace announced its General Electric Advanced Turboprop (ATP) (now General Electric Catalyst) had been selected to power the aircraft. On 23 May 2016 Textron announced the SETP performance and cabin details. At the 2016 AirVenture in Oshkosh, Wisconsin, the project was named Cessna Denali. In May 2017, after testing with a fuel system ground testing rig and the propeller, Textron announced it had started building static and fatigue test articles, including the aft cargo door. Flight testing was to begin in the third quarter of 2018, followed by certification in 2019.

In February 2018, assembly of the first prototype was underway in Wichita. Its first flight was scheduled to occur before the end of the year. By then, its unit cost was $4.8 million, and service entry was scheduled for 2020.

In May 2018, ground tests continued, and all major components were being fabricated, including the nose, fuselage, wings and the tail cone.

Three flying prototypes were being completed for an intended first flight scheduled for early 2019.

By October 2018, the first prototypes fuselages and flight controls were nearly complete, and wings were starting to be constructed towards a 2020 certification. By October 2019, the first flight was pushed back by GE Catalyst testing delays, with Textron expecting its first turboprop in 2020.

By July 2021, the turboprop engine was to have its maiden flight in a King Air 350 testbed aircraft in the coming months. The engine's certification was scheduled for late 2022. A Catalyst engine was installed on a Denali airframe to make its first flight before year-end and to achieve aircraft certification in 2023.

On November 23, 2021, the Denali made its first flight from Textron Aviation's facilities in Wichita, Kansas. The 2-hour and 50-minute flight reached 180 kn (210 mph; 330 km/h) and an altitude of 15,600 feet. The certification program will use two additional flight prototypes and three ground test airframes. The second prototype first flew in mid-June 2022 and joined the test program.

By May 2023, the prototypes had completed 540 flights and 1,300 flying hours. Textron confirmed the Garmin emergency autoland feature was operating correctly, but certification was pushed back to 2025 due to certification delays in the GE Catalyst engine program. In 2023, the aircraft's equipped price was forecasted to be $6.45M. As of May 6, 2024, the Beechcraft Denali has reached key milestones, with Textron confirming the start of its flight test phase following FAA Type Inspection Authorization.

In February 2025, the Federal Aviation Administration granted the GE Catalyst certification after more than 8,000 hours of tests, clearing the Denali for a 2026 introduction as the three prototypes gathered over 2,700 flight hours in 1,100 flights.

As of September 2025, the three Denali aircraft being used for FAA certification testing had flown a combined total of 1,340 flights and 3,330 hours, with certification expected in 2026.

== Design ==
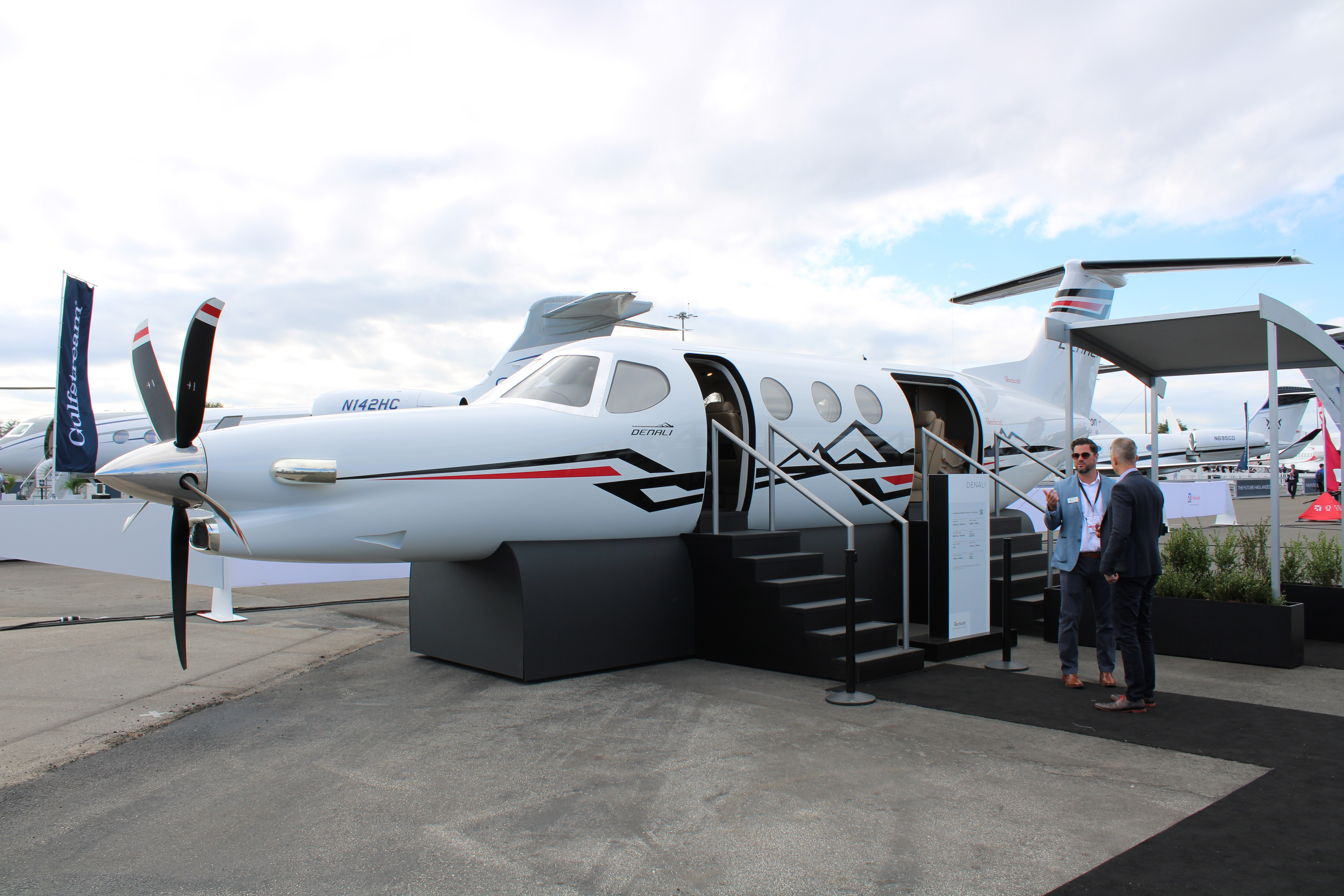
Denali fuselage mockup at 2022 NBAA-BACE.

Cabin altitude at 31,000 ft (9,400 m) should be 6,130 ft (1,870 m). Its cabin is 58×63 in (147×160 cm) tall and wide with a flat floor, 3 inches (7.6 cm) wider than its closest competitor; the 59×53 in (150×135 cm) tall by wide cargo door is larger than the PC-12's 53×52 in (135×132 cm) door.

Metal bonding makes the wings more resistant to fuel leaks and automatic drilling saves some labor. The cabin is precisely mated to other structures thanks to routing and pin-locating tools. To lower the number of holes and fasteners needed, large parts like the wing spar and main doors are monolithically machined from a single aluminum billet, or chemically milled like the titanium firewall.

In May 2023 the manufacturer announced that the aircraft will be delivered with Garmin Emergency Autoland as standard equipment.

== Specifications ==
Data from Textron

General characteristics

- Crew: 1-2
- Capacity: 7-9 passengers/1,100 lb (500 kg) full fuel payload
- Length: 48 ft 9 in (14.86 m)
- Wingspan: 54 ft 3 in (16.54 m)
- Height: 15 ft 2 in (4.62 m)
- Cabin height : 58 in (150 cm)
- Cabin width : 63 in (160 cm)
- Cabin length : 16 ft 9 in (5.11 m)
- Powerplant: 1 × General Electric Catalyst turboprop, 1,300 hp (970 kW)
- Propellers: 5-bladed McCauley, 8 ft 9 in (2.67 m) diameter composite, fully feathering and reversible

Performance

- Cruise speed: 328 mph (528 km/h, 285 kn) maximum
- Range: 1,800 mi (3,000 km, 1,600 nmi) 1 pilot, 4 passengers, high speed cruise
- Service ceiling: 31,000 ft (9,400 m)
- Takeoff distance : 2,950 ft (900 m)

Avionics

- Garmin G3000

== See also ==
Aircraft of comparable role, configuration, and era

- CAIGA Primus 150
- Epic E1000
- Kestrel K-350
- Pilatus PC-12
- Piper Meridian
- SOCATA TBM
