= Epic Victory =

Prototype very light jet aircraft

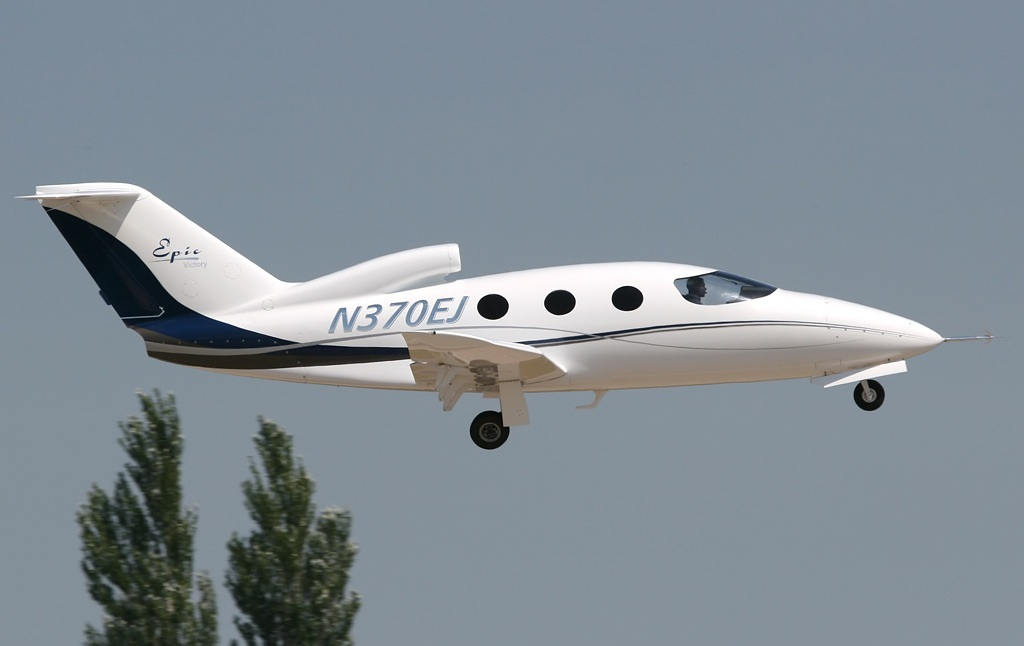

General information
- Type: Very Light Jet
- Manufacturer: Epic Aircraft
- Status: Production suspended
- Primary user: None
- Number built: 1

History
- First flight: 6 July 2007

The Epic Victory was the second experimental jet designed by Epic Aircraft, a company that was based in Bend, Oregon. Epic Aircraft declared bankruptcy in 2009. Its assets were acquired by Aviation Industry Corporation of China and LT Builders Group; which as of July 2010 were in the process of restarting production of the Victory.

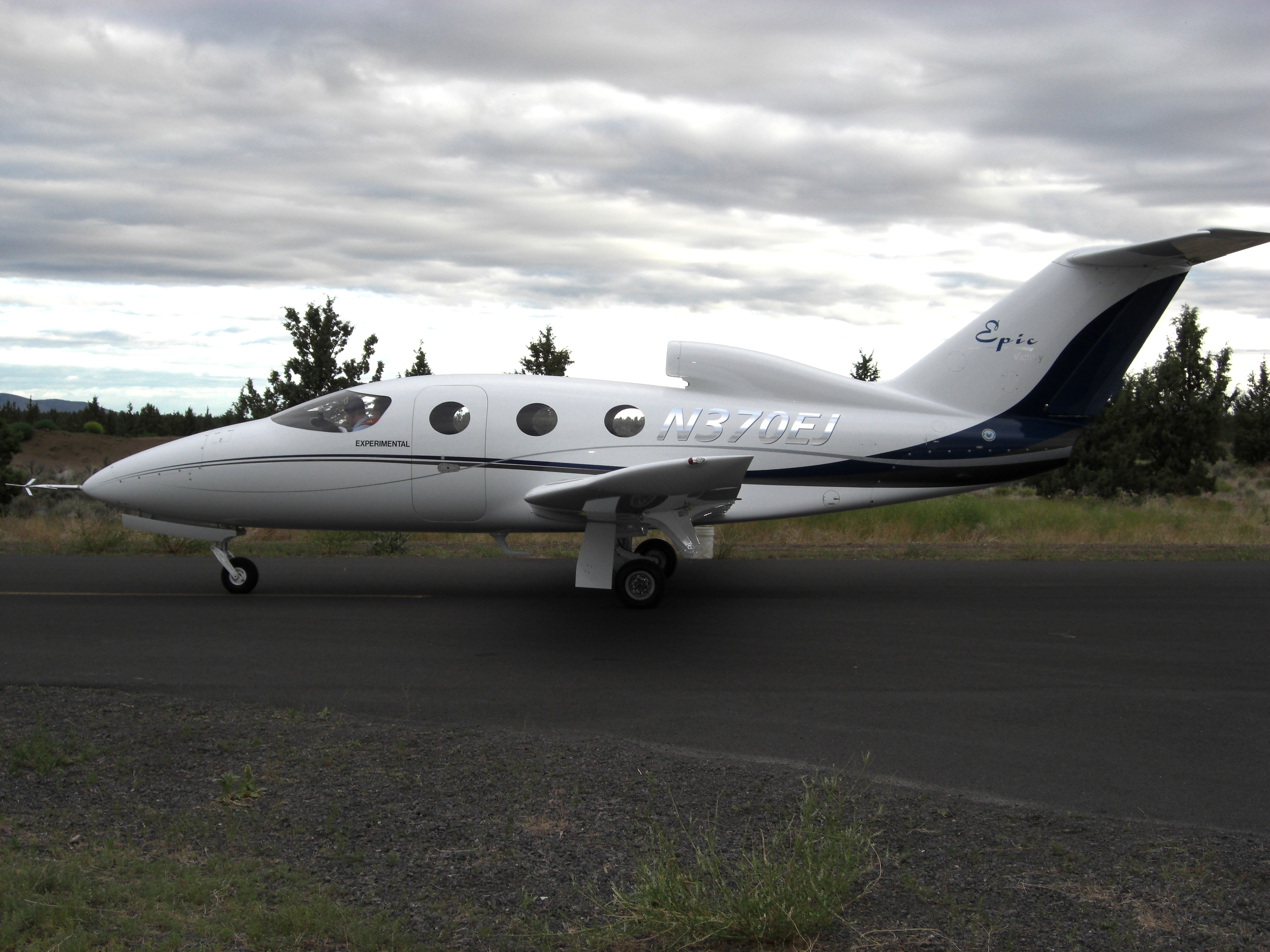
Epic Victory test flight at Epic facility in Bend

== Development ==
The Victory is a single-engine very light jet that was intended to be powered by a single Pratt & Whitney Canada PW600. Epic used the Williams FJ33 engine for testing but planned to switch to the PW600 for final production.

The aircraft seats 4 to 5, including the pilots, in a 2+2 or a 2+1+2 configuration. The aircraft took Epic six and a half months to design from concept to a flying prototype, with the first flight on 6 July 2007 from Roberts Field in Redmond, Oregon.

The company had intended that the jet would be available for less than US$1 million. The aircraft was displayed at the Experimental Aircraft Association's AirVenture fly-in in 2007 at Oshkosh, Wisconsin, where the company began accepting down payments.

The prototype's Federal Aviation Administration registration expired on 31 May 2017. It has not been renewed and the aircraft has been deregistered.

== Specifications ==
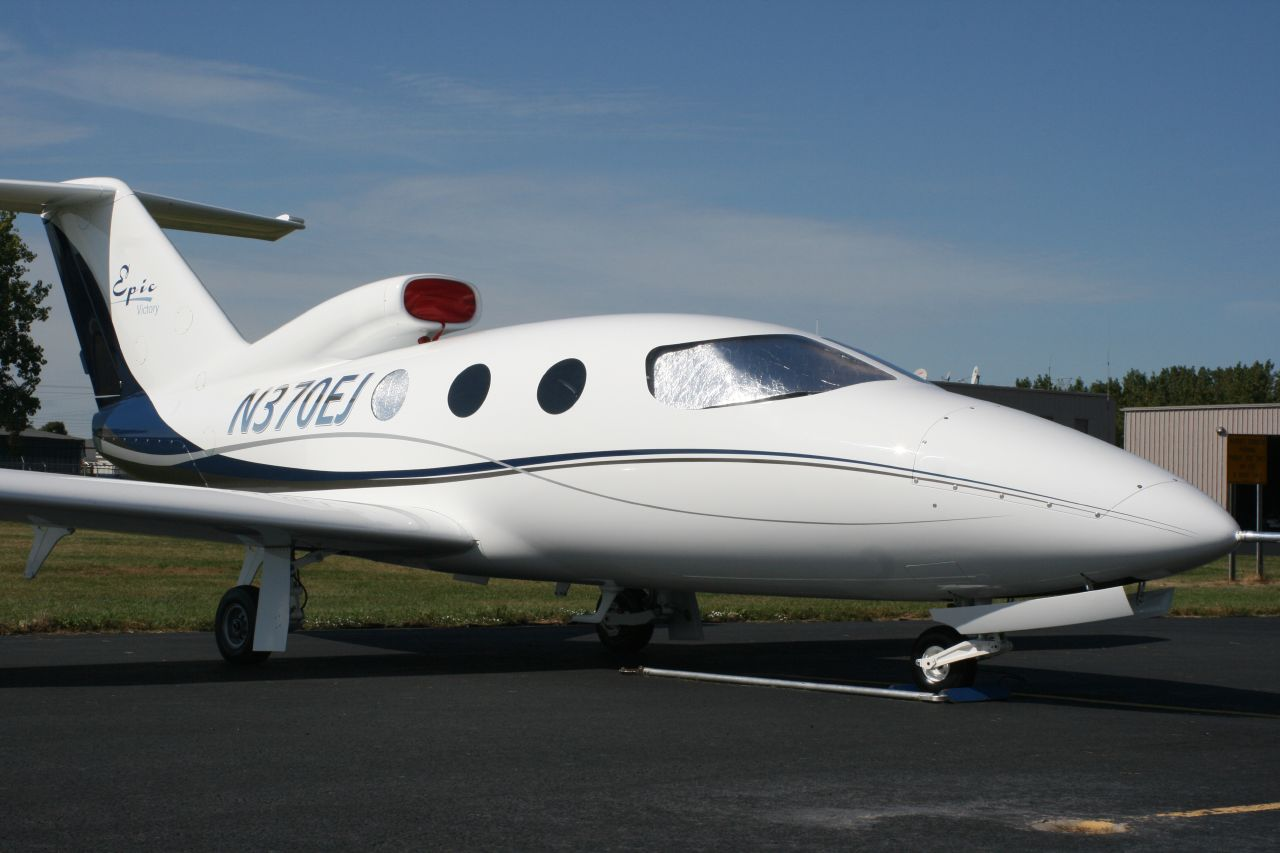
Epic Victory

General characteristics

- Crew: 1
- Capacity: 3 to 4
- Length: 33 ft 5 in (10.19 m)
- Wingspan: 36 ft 4 in (11.08 m)
- Height: 10 ft 8.5 in (3.26 m)
- Empty weight: 2,700 lb (1,225 kg)
- Gross weight: 5,500 lb (2,495 kg)
- Powerplant: 1 × Pratt & Whitney Canada PW600

Performance

- Maximum speed: 368 mph (592 km/h, 320 kn)
- Cruise speed: 288 mph (463 km/h, 250 kn)
- Range: 1,380 mi (2,222 km, 1,200 nmi)
- Service ceiling: 28,000 ft (8,537 m)

== See also ==
- Very light jet

Aircraft of comparable role, configuration, and era

- Cirrus Vision SF50
- Eclipse 400
- Flaris LAR01
