= China Aviation Industry General Aircraft =

Chinese aircraft manufacturer

China Aviation Industry General Aircraft Co., Ltd.
- Industry: Aerospace
- Founded: July 2009
- Headquarters: Zhuhai, Guangdong, China
- Key people: Wu Guangquan (Chairman)
- Products: General aviation aircraft
- Total assets: CN¥ 54.4 billion
- Owner: Aviation Industry Corporation of China; Guangdong Yuecai Investment Holdings; Guangdong Hengjian Investment Holding; Gree Electric
- Parent: Aviation Industry Corporation of China
- Divisions: CAIGA South China Aircraft Industry; CAIGA North China Aircraft Industry; Wuhan Special Vehicle Corporation; Special Vehicle & General Aircraft Research Institute
- Subsidiaries: Cirrus Aircraft
- Website: www.caiga.cn

China Aviation Industry General Aircraft (CAIGA) is a Chinese aircraft manufacturer headquartered in Zhuhai, Guangdong. It was established as a division of the state-owned Aviation Industry Corporation of China (AVIC) in July 2009.

The company purchased the assets of the bankrupt Epic Aircraft in 2010, forming a partnership with the LT Builders Group operate the company under a judge's ordered deal. CAIGA sold its stake in Epic to the Russian company Engineering LLC in March 2012.

In 2011, CAIGA purchased the American Cirrus Aircraft company.

== Aircraft ==
Aircraft built by CAIGA South China Aircraft Industry
Model name	Status	Type	Designer	Note
Leadair AG300	Flight test	Turboprop business aircraft	Special Vehicle & General Aircraft Research Institute	Developed from Epic LT, previously called Primus 150
AVIC AG600	Flight test	Amphibious aircraft	Special Vehicle & General Aircraft Research Institute	
Citation XLS+	Discontinued	Business jet	Cessna	Under joint venture with Cessna

Aircraft built by CAIGA North China Aircraft Industry
Model name	Status	Type	Designer	Note
Y-5B	In production	light utility aircraft	Hongdu Aviation Industry Group	
Cessna 208B	Discontinued	Light transport turboprop	Cessna	Under joint venture with Cessna
Y-15-2000	Design stage	utility aircraft	Special Vehicle & General Aircraft Research Institute	

Aircraft built by subsidiary of Special Vehicle & General Aircraft Research Institute
Model name	Status	Type	Designer	Note
A2C	In production	light Amphibious aircraft	Special Vehicle & General Aircraft Research Institute	
Leadfly 910	Design stage	Ground effect vehicle	Special Vehicle & General Aircraft Research Institute	Produced by Wuhan Special Vehicle Corporation
LCA-60T	Design stage	Airship	Special Vehicle & General Aircraft Research Institute	Under joint venture with Flying Whale(France) Holdings(FWF)
Golden Eagle	In production	Airship	Special Vehicle & General Aircraft Research Institute	
SZ300	In production	Tethered balloon	Special Vehicle & General Aircraft Research Institute	

Aircraft built by Cirrus Design Corporation
Model name	Status	Type	Designer	Note
Cirrus SR20	In production	Light aircraft	Cirrus Aircraft	
Cirrus SR22/22T	In production	Light aircraft	Cirrus Aircraft	
Cirrus Vision SF50	In production	Very light jet	Cirrus Aircraft	

Summary of aircraft invested by CAIGA
Model name	Status	Type	Designer	Note
Y-12	Flight test	utility aircraft	Harbin Aircraft Industry Group	Under joint venture with HAIG

Summary of project cancelled and in plan
Model name	Status	Type	Designer	Note
AG50	Concept	Light-sport aircraft	Special Vehicle & General Aircraft Research Institute	
AG100	Concept	Trainer		
H660	Concept	Ground effect vehicle	Special Vehicle & General Aircraft Research Institute	
H631	Concept	Ground effect vehicle	Special Vehicle & General Aircraft Research Institute	
Flyboat 30	Concept	Airship	Special Vehicle & General Aircraft Research Institute	

- Products produced by Cirrus Aircraft are not included here
