= FCG =

FCG may refer to:

== Football clubs ==
- FC Goa, an association football club in India
- FC Gratkorn, an association football club in Austria
- FC Grenoble Rugby, a French rugby union club
- FC Guardia, as association football club in Vatican City
- FC Gütersloh 2000, an association football club in Germany
- FC Gundelfingen, an association football club in German
- FC Groningen, an association football club in the Netherlands

== Other uses ==
- Calouste Gulbenkian Foundation (Portuguese: Fundação Calouste Gulbenkian), a Portuguese cultural organization
- Fire control group
- Flight Consulting Group, a Latvian holding company
- Flux compression generator
- Fluid construction grammar
- Francis Carruthers Gould (1844–1925), British caricaturist and political cartoonist
- Fujisankei Communications Group, a Japanese media company
- The Fund for Constitutional Government, an American civil rights organization
