= AVIC AG600 =

Chinese large amphibious flying boat

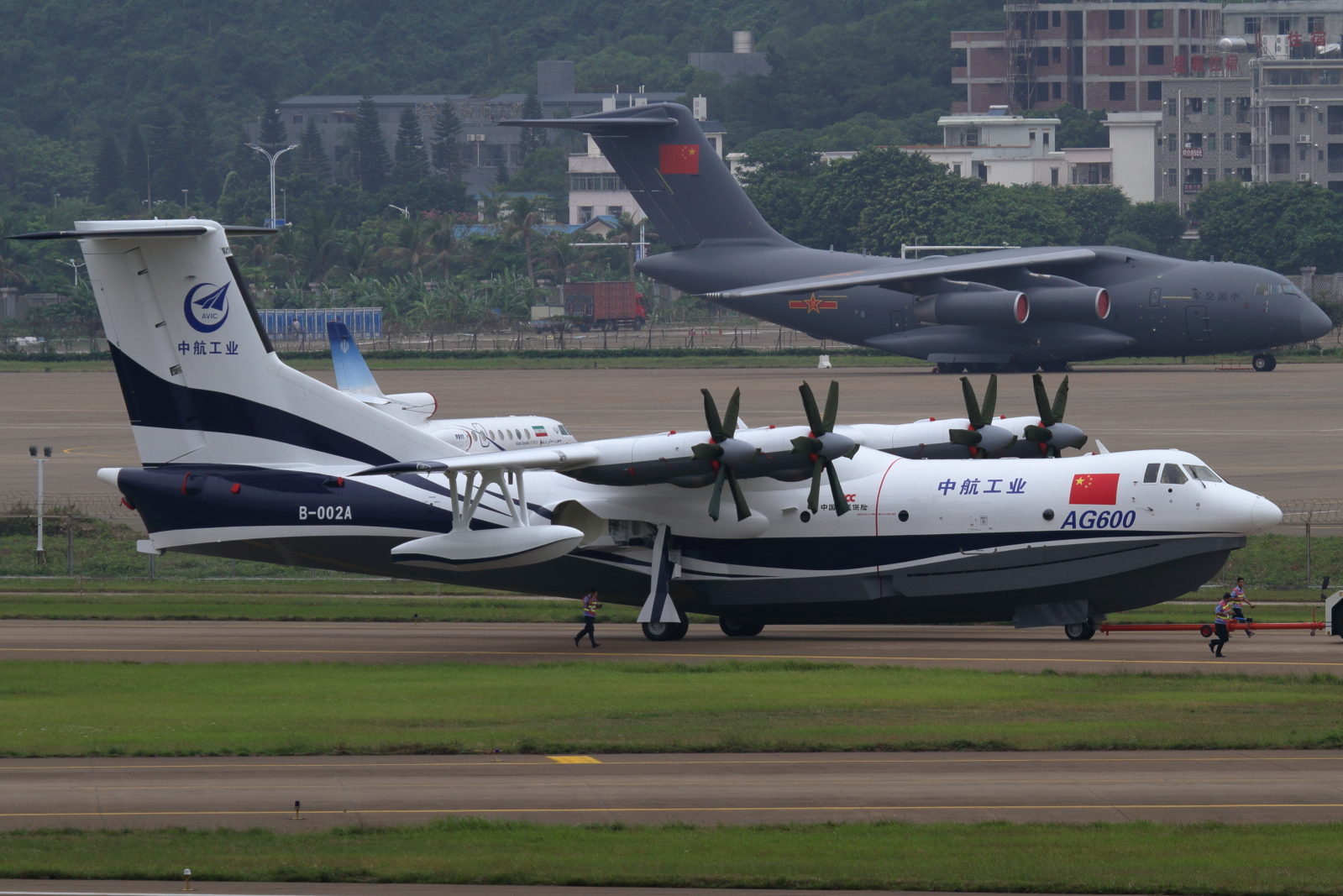
- AG600 at the 2016 Airshow China, Y-20 behind

General information
- Type: Utility amphibious flying boat
- National origin: China
- Manufacturer: CAIGA
- Designer: AVIC Special Vehicle Research Institute
- Status: Type certificate obtained. Production delivery expected for October 2025.

History
- First flight: 24 December 2017

The AVIC AG600 Kunlong (Chinese: 鲲龙; pinyin: kūnlóng; lit. 'Kun Dragon') is a large seaplane designed by AVIC and assembled by CAIGA. Powered by four Ivchenko AI-20 turboprops, it is one of the largest flying boats with a 53.5 t (118,000 lb) MTOW. After five years of development, assembly started in August 2014, it was rolled out on 23 July 2016 and it made its first flight from Zhuhai Airport on 24 December 2017. It obtained its type certificate in 2025, with deliveries starting in October 2025.

== Development ==
The AG600 was previously known as the TA-600; it was designated the Dragon 600 before TA-600. After five years of development, CAIGA started to build the aircraft in August 2014, for a first flight targeted at the time for 2015. Assembly was still on its way in October 2015. The prototype was rolled out on 23 July 2016 at the Zhuhai AVIC factory. At the roll-out, AVIC targeted a maiden flight by the end of 2016 and it has then gathered 17 orders, all from the Chinese government including the China Coast Guard, AVIC does not expect to produce it in large numbers. Target markets also include export sales, with island countries such as New Zealand and Malaysia having expressed an interest.

On 24 December 2017, it made its maiden flight from Zhuhai Jinwan Airport. In May 2018, AVIC planned to have Civil Aviation Administration of China type certification completed by 2021 and deliveries starting in 2022.

After transfer from Zhuhai to Jingmen, the prototype started low-speed taxiing on the Zhanghe reservoir on 30 August 2018. On 20 October 2018, the prototype AG600 completed its first water take-off and landing at Jingmen's Zhanghe Reservoir and on 26 July 2020, the AG600 completed its first test flight from the ocean, after taking off from Qingdao.

An AG600M, being a dedicated firefighting model, successfully completed scooping and dropping water tests in September 2022. Further variants may be developed for maritime surveillance, resource detection, passenger and cargo transport. It is one of the three big plane projects approved by the State Council of China, along with the Xi'an Y-20 military transport and the Comac C919 airliner.

== Design ==
The AG600 amphibious aircraft has a single body flying boat fuselage, cantilevered high wings, four Ivchenko AI-20 turboprops and tricycle retractable landing gear. It can operate from 1,500 by 200 m (4,920 by 660 ft) stretches of water 2.5 m (8.2 ft) deep, and should be able to conduct Sea State 3 operations with 2 m (6.6 ft) waves. It was developed for aerial firefighting, collecting 12 t (26,000 lb) of water in 20 seconds and transporting up to 12 t (26,000 lb) of water on a single tank of fuel and search and rescue, retrieving up to 50 people at sea.

Assembled by CAIGA, it is 39.6 m (129.9 ft) long and has a 38.8 m (127.3 ft) wingspan, its MTOW is 53.5 t (118,000 lb) from paved runways or 48.8 t (108,000 lb) from choppy sea. AVIC claims it is the largest amphibious aircraft. It is heavier than the 41 t (90,000 lb) MTOW Beriev Be-200 or the 47.7 t (105,000 lb) ShinMaywa US-2, but lighter than the prototype-only 86 t (190,000 lb) Beriev A-40. Previous seaplanes were heavier, as the 75 t (165,000 lb) Martin JRM Mars or the prototypes 100 t (220,000 lb) Blohm & Voss BV 238, 156 t (345,000 lb) Saunders-Roe Princess or 180 t (400,000 lb) Hughes H-4 Hercules.

It could access remote atolls in the South China Sea's Spratly Islands, claimed by several bordering nations, as the South China Sea is subjected to territorial disputes. It can fly in four hours from the southern city of Sanya to James Shoal, the southernmost edge of China's territorial claims.

== Specifications (AG600) ==
Data from AVIC

General characteristics

- Capacity: 50 rescued or 12 t (26,000 lb) of water
- Length: 36.9 m (121 ft 1 in)
- Wingspan: 38.8 m (127 ft 4 in)
- Height: 12.1 m (39 ft 8 in)
- Max takeoff weight: 53,500 kg (117,947 lb) from land, 49,800 kg (109,800 lb) from choppy sea
- Powerplant: 4 × Ivchenko AI-20 turboprops
- Propellers: 6-bladed

Performance

- Maximum speed: 560 km/h (350 mph, 300 kn)
- Cruise speed: 500 km/h (310 mph, 270 kn) max
- Range: 4,500 km (2,800 mi, 2,400 nmi)
- Endurance: 12h
- Service ceiling: 6,000 m (20,000 ft)
- Operations from: 1,500 m (4,900 ft) of water

== See also ==
- Harbin SH-5

Aircraft of comparable role, configuration, and era

- ShinMaywa US-2
