= Epic Aircraft =

American aircraft manufacturer in Oregon

Epic Aircraft, LLC
- Company type: Private
- Industry: Aerospace
- Founded: 2004
- Headquarters: Bend, Oregon
- Key people: Doug King (CEO 2010–present)
- Products: General aviation aircraft
- Owner: Tanya Eves
- Number of employees: 475 (2024)
- Website: www.epicaircraft.com

Epic Aircraft is a general aviation aircraft manufacturer headquartered in Bend, Oregon. The company produces the Epic E1000 AX single engine turboprop design.

Founded in 2004, the company initially manufactured and sold kits for the Epic LT. Epic went through bankruptcy in 2009, before being purchased by Russian businessman Vladislav Filev of S7 Airlines in 2012. Filev and his family owned the company through Cyprus-based MVF Key Investments Ltd until 2024, when Tanya Eves purchased a majority share in the company.

In 2013, Epic stopped taking orders for LT kits to concentrate on the certification of the E1000, which is based upon the LT. The E1000's FAA certification was completed in November 2019.

== History ==
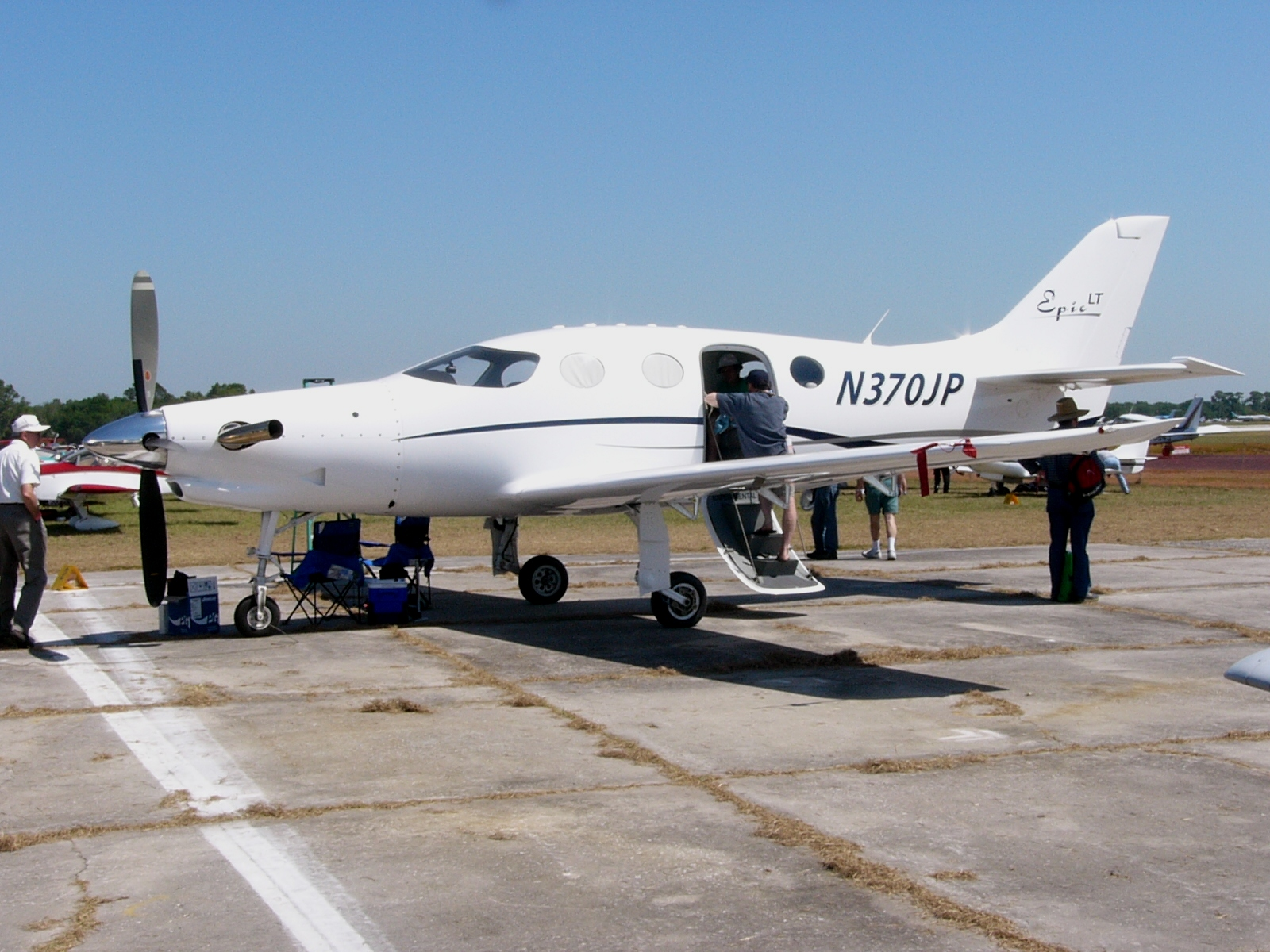
Epic LT experimental single turboprop aircraft

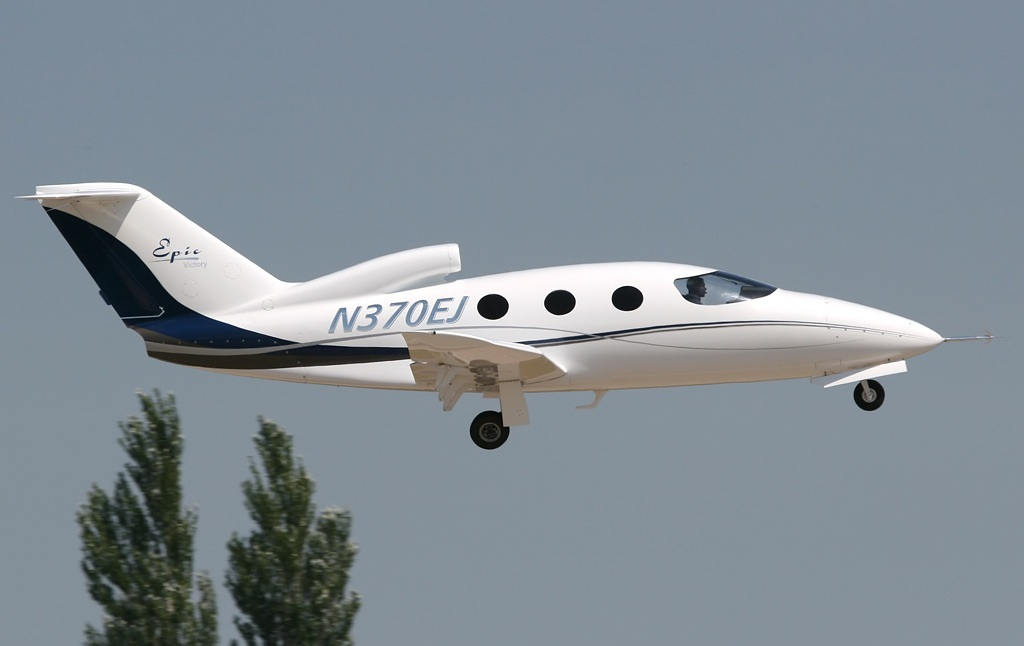
Epic Victory single jet aircraft

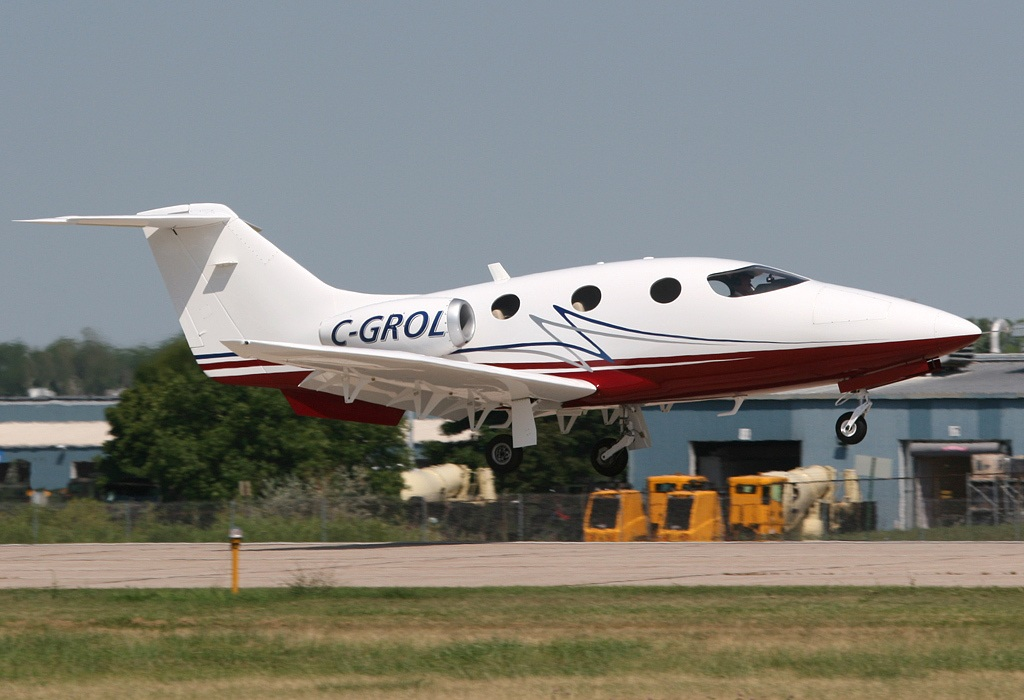
Epic Elite twin turbojet aircraft

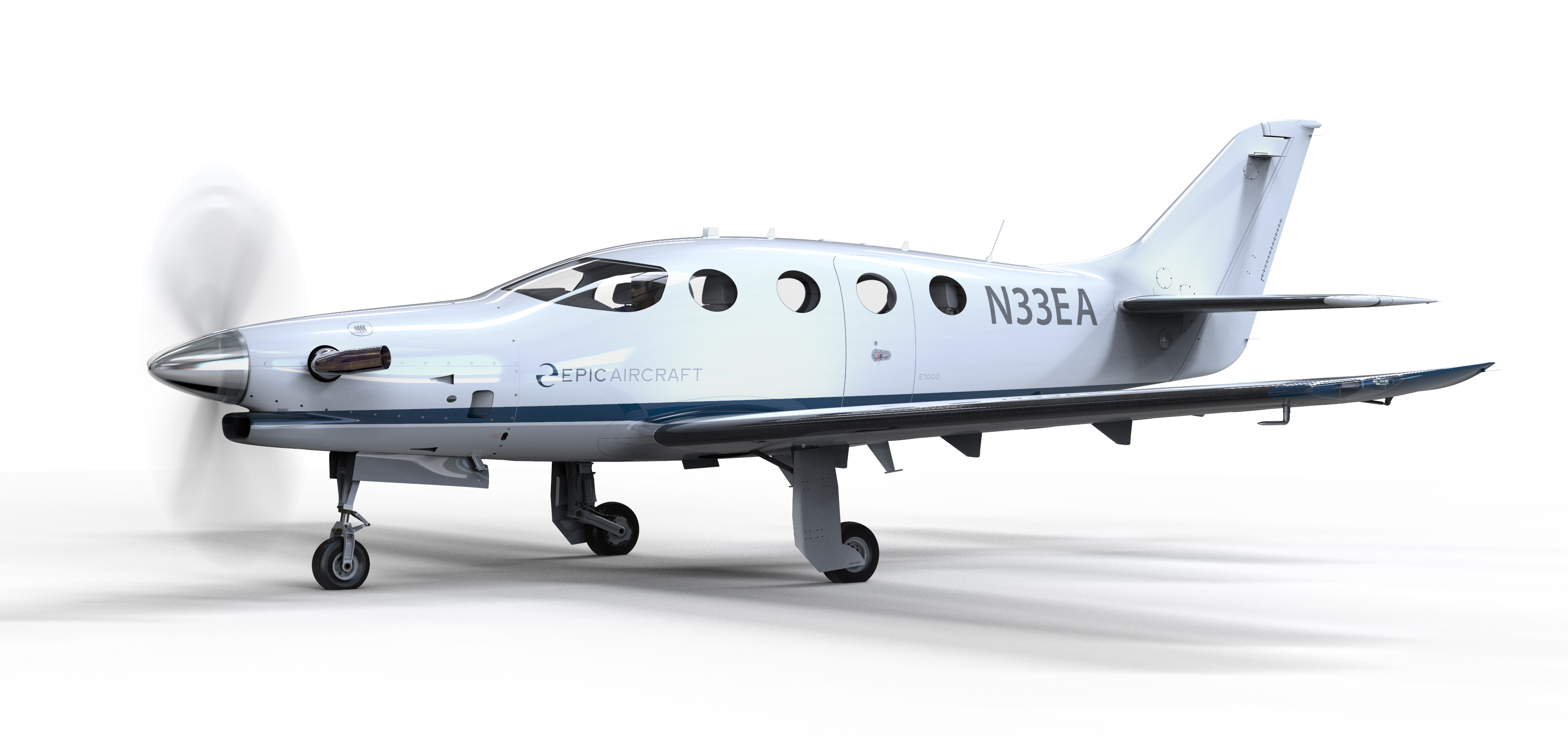
Epic E1000 single turboprop aircraft

=== Early years ===
The company was founded by Rick Schrameck, who was experienced in the computer hardware and aviation composites industries, in 2004 in Bend, Oregon due to public incentives, including state loans and grants of US$1.3M. In return for the grants and loans, Epic promised to create 4,000 jobs.

Epic’s first aircraft, the LT, was positioned as a homebuilt kit aircraft, and Schrameck claimed deliveries were estimated to begin by year’s end 2005. The FAA approved the LT as an amateur-built craft in 2006. The same year, the first LT was delivered.

On 5 June 2009, Epic was sued by Blue Sky AvGroup, an Epic customer that had an aircraft under construction at the build center, alleging that Epic had failed to meet its contractual obligations. The case was dismissed in 2013 "without an award of costs, disbursements or attorney’s fees to any party."

In late June 2009, the company dramatically scaled back its operations. The layoffs primarily affected the aircraft's owner-assisted build center, where customers worked on their own kits. Epic was subsequently named as plaintiff in July 2009 in a lawsuit against engine maker Williams International, claiming that the engine maker defaulted on a contract to supply engines for the Epic Victory program.

On 8 August 2009, the company's premises were seized by the building's landlord, Delaware-registered ER1 LLC.

In September 2009, CEO Schrameck was removed by the board of directors from any "managerial or supervisory capacity" with Epic parent company Aircraft Investor Resources, and the company entered Chapter 11 bankruptcy.

Due to his actions at Epic, Schrameck was arrested for fraud in March 2015. On 27 March 2015, he pleaded not guilty in US District Court to eight counts of wire fraud, four counts of mail fraud and six counts of money laundering regarding his dealings with Epic and its customers. The case alleged that Schrameck deliberately defrauded customers of more than US$14 million. In April 2018, Schrameck pleaded "guilty" to one count of wire fraud. The Department of Justice, US Attorney's Office, District of Oregon stated, "Schrameck gave customers Airframe Purchase Agreements and Aircraft Completion Assistance Agreements that misrepresented how the customers’ funds were being used. Without his customers’ knowledge, Schrameck used the funds for other projects, to complete existing Epic LT aircraft, and to support his own lavish lifestyle."

Epic LT owner Doug King filed a motion requesting that the bankruptcy proceedings be moved from Nevada to Bend. That filing included a sworn statement by Chief Financial Officer David Clark, saying that Epic owed its customer builders an estimated US$15 million for parts and that the company had no money to pay those debts.

=== Reorganization and acquisition by Engineering LLC ===
Following the bankruptcy filing, Epic went up for sale. In an auction on 26 March 2010, the state-owned China Aviation Industry General Aircraft was the highest bidder with a US$4.3 million offer, beating out a bid by the LT Builders Group, a group of seven aircraft owners with incomplete aircraft in the plant. The hearing judge admonished the LT Builders Group for their bid describing it as "pathetic, useless, incompetent, unacceptable, garbage and fiction" but gave the group another chance to improve their position and reserved his decision on the final winner of the auction until 2 April 2010.

On 2 April 2010, the judge issued a judgement ordering China Aviation Industry General Aircraft Co. Ltd. to make an agreement with the LT Builders Group to acquire Epic's assets. The deal came about following public concern about why a state-owned Chinese aerospace company would take interest in Epic, although the primary theories were that the Chinese firm was interested in acquiring Epic's designs or the carbon-fiber composites used in Epic's aircraft. Due to potential concerns, the final deal excluded any defense-related material potentially subject to International Traffic in Arms Regulations from the purchase.

The deal was completed by 11 April 2010, with the LT Builders Group taking control of the company and marketing the Epic LT to North America, while the Chinese company obtained rights to market the Epic LT to the rest of the world. The new company intended to reopen the Bend plant for builder-assist construction as well as pursue type certification of the Epic LT, a project which the original company owners had started, but not completed.

Doug King became CEO, as an unpaid volunteer in 2010, following the bankruptcy. He was the CEO of the LT Builders Group, and had owned several transaction processing and computer services businesses and had revitalized operations of Syncro Aircraft. King had an incomplete LT in the plant and wanted to get it completed and decided to help get the company turned around and profitable, with an aim of certifying the LT design.

At AirVenture on 31 July 2010 King announced that the company was ready to take orders for the Epic LT kit aircraft at that time and that 11 aircraft were in plant, being completed by their owners.

In November 2011, a Russian, Vladislav Filev, the owner of S7 Airlines, visited the Epic plant. An enthusiastic private pilot, he was looking for his ideal personal aircraft. King took him for a demo flight in an LT and Filev decided to buy the company to pave the way for type certification for the LT.

Filev's company, Engineering LLC, became the owner of Epic in March 2012 for US$200M and announced its certification plans for the LT design. As part of this plan the company entered into negotiations with Cessna in December 2012 to buy the former Columbia Aircraft plant that Cessna then owned in Bend. The company indicated that it expected to hire 40-80 new employees in 2013 as part of the certification effort and to expand kit production.

By October 2014 the company reported that it had 60 orders for the E1000. At that time, the company forecast selling 50 aircraft per year.

=== E1000 era ===
The company's E1000 single engine turboprop had its first flight on 19 December 2015.

The design encountered a set-back in the summer of 2018 when it was discovered that it was 10 to 20 kn (19 to 37 km/h) slower than its promised cruise speed. The problem was traced to ram air recovery in the engine intake design. This design had been dictated by certification requirements and the engine manufacturer's approval, over the non-certified LT intake design. Redesign and flight testing added six months to the process.

On 31 March 2019 Filev's wife, Natalia Fileva, was killed in the crash of an Epic LT on approach to the Frankfurt Egelsbach Airport. Fileva was one of the wealthiest women in Russia and co-owner of S7 Airlines, with her husband. Her father and the pilot were also killed in the crash. The German Federal Bureau of Aircraft Accident Investigation found in its investigation that on approach, the plane had made a 30–45 degree left-sided bank turn. Kommersant reported that the cause of the crash was pilot error, likely a pilot-induced stall.

The US Federal Aviation Administration awarded the E1000 its type certification in November 2019. The certification effort had been initially estimated by King to take three years and cost US$20M, but took seven years and about US$200M. At the time of certification the company had more than 80 orders for the E1000.

After certification the company indicated that it intends to ramp up production to one aircraft every three weeks by the second half of 2020 and earn its production certificate, so each individual aircraft will not require FAA inspection prior to delivery. This will be followed by one aircraft every two weeks by the first half of 2021 and work towards one aircraft a week. The goal is to ultimately produce 50 aircraft per year.

The company announced in May 2020 that the first two E1000s had been delivered to customers. In July 2020, Epic earned FAA production certification for the E1000, allowing the company to build, test, and approve aircraft with less FAA oversight.

That month, the E1000 was named as the winner of Flying magazine's 2020 Innovation Award. Flying's Editor-in-Chief Julie Boatman, noted the aircraft's deliveries started during the COVID-19 pandemic. Plane & Pilot magazine named the E1000 its 2020 plane of the year, citing its powerful engine, range, and design. That December, Epic and ATP, an aircraft software company, announced a partnership for tracking maintenance and distributing technical publications.

In July 2021, the updated E1000 GX received its FAA type certificate, equipped with Garmin's GFC 700 autopilot and a Hartzell 5-blade composite propeller. By the end of July, Epic expanded its service network to three facilities in the United States with a Fort Worth-based maintenance station. By the third quarter of 2021, Epic had delivered six E1000 GX aircraft, with another 4 delivered by the end of fourth quarter. To increase production capacity, Epic hired 175 additional staff between July and December 2021. The company delivered 80 certified planes as of 2024.

Also during 2024, Tanya Eves purchased a majority share in Epic Aircraft.

Epic announced a new model, the E1000 AX, in April 2025. Its new features include autoland technology and autothrottle and other features associated with the Garmin G1000 avionics system.

The E1000 AX model earned FAA certification in July 2025. The next month, Garmin's StormOptix radar received FAA certification to be installed on E1000, E1000 GX, and E1000 AX models.

== Products ==
- The LT is a 6-place kit-built turbo-prop airplane, later replaced by the E1000.
- The Victory was a proposed single-engine jet project in 2007.
- The E1000 is a type certified six-place turbo-prop airplane. It is the type-certified, manufactured version of the Epic LT.
- The Escape was a proposed 92% scaled version of the Epic LT in 2007, with 4 to 6 seats.
- The Elite was a proposed twin-engine jet project, initially intended as a kit aircraft in 2008.
- The E1000 GX is a type certified single turbo-prop airplane based on the E1000. The E1000 GX replaced the E1000 as the only product Epic Aircraft is manufacturing.
- The E1000 AX, with new features, replaced the E1000 GX in April 2025.
