= Frankfurt Egelsbach Airport =

Airport in Egelsbach, Hesse, Germany

Frankfurt Egelsbach Airport Flugplatz Frankfurt-Egelsbach

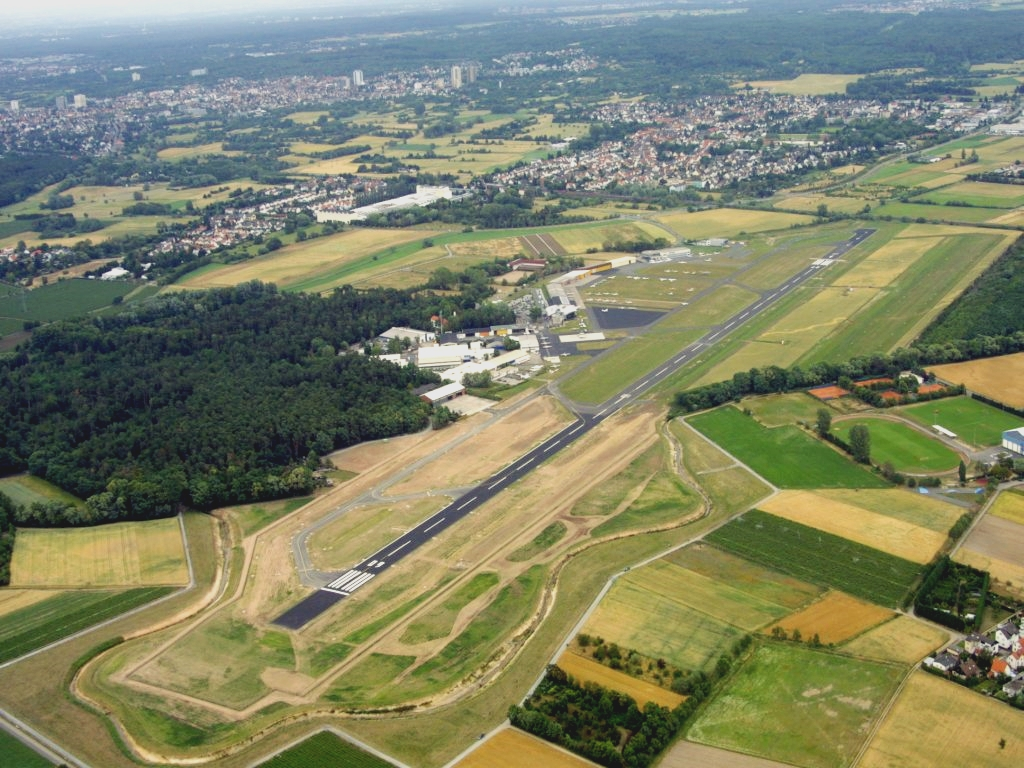
- IATA: QEF; ICAO: EDFE

Summary
- Airport type: Public
- Operator: Hessische Flugplatz GmbH Egelsbach
- Serves: Frankfurt, Germany
- Location: Egelsbach
- Elevation AMSL: 385 ft / 117 m
- Coordinates: 49°57′40″N 008°38′37″E
- Website: www.egelsbach-airport.com

Map

Runways
Direction	Length		Surface
Direction	m	ft	Surface
08/26	1,400	4,593	Asphalt
08/26	670	2,198	Grass
- Source: AIP VFR Excerpts,

Frankfurt Egelsbach Airport (German: Flugplatz Frankfurt-Egelsbach) (ICAO: EDFE) is a general aviation airport located near Egelsbach, a town in the German state of Hesse. It is located 10 km (6 mi) southeast of Frankfurt Airport.

== History ==
The airport was opened in 1955 with a single grass runway. It proved popular, and by 1957 was already seeing 37,000 movements a year. An asphalt runway was constructed in 1966 and by 1977 the number of movements had increased to 126,000 a year. In 2007, about 77,000 movements were made, making it the busiest airport for general aviation in Germany.

In 2004, to allow for larger aircraft to land, construction was started on a runway expansion, which increased the runway length to its current 1,400 metres (4,600 ft). In May 2009, NetJets Europe announced that they intended to purchase the airport.

Today Triwo AG owns the majority of the Airport. Before the last transaction, NetJets owned 87,73% of the aerodrome (the rest being owned by the local authorities of Egelsbach and Langen) and intended to establish IFR procedures at the airport, including an ILS approach. There are also plans to extend the runway by another 270 metres (890 ft) and to increase the width by 5 metres (16 ft).

== Facilities ==
The airport resides at an elevation of 385 feet (117 m) above mean sea level. It has two runways, both in the 08/26 direction (thought number left (L) or right (R) markings or indicators are used): a 1,400 by 25 metres (4,593 ft × 82 ft) asphalt runway and a 670 by 30 metres (2,198 ft × 98 ft) grass runway.

== Airlines and destinations ==
There are no scheduled services to and from Frankfurt Egelsbach Airport.

== Accidents and incidents ==
- On 1 March 2012, a Cessna Citation X arriving from Linz Airport crashed in a forest about 4 km (2.5 mi) from the airport. All five people on board were killed. The reason for the crash is unknown.
- On 30 June 2015, a Diamond DA20 Katana experienced problems during takeoff and struck the overhead wires on the adjacent Main-Neckar Railway. The plane crashed and was then hit by a goods train. The pilot was severely injured and the co-pilot died.
- On 31 March 2019, an Epic LT crashed while landing. The chairwoman and co-owner of S7 Airlines Natalia Fileva, died in the crash along with two other people on board.

== See also ==
- Transport in Germany
- List of airports in Germany
