= Business aircraft =

Aircraft typically used by corporations for own purposes

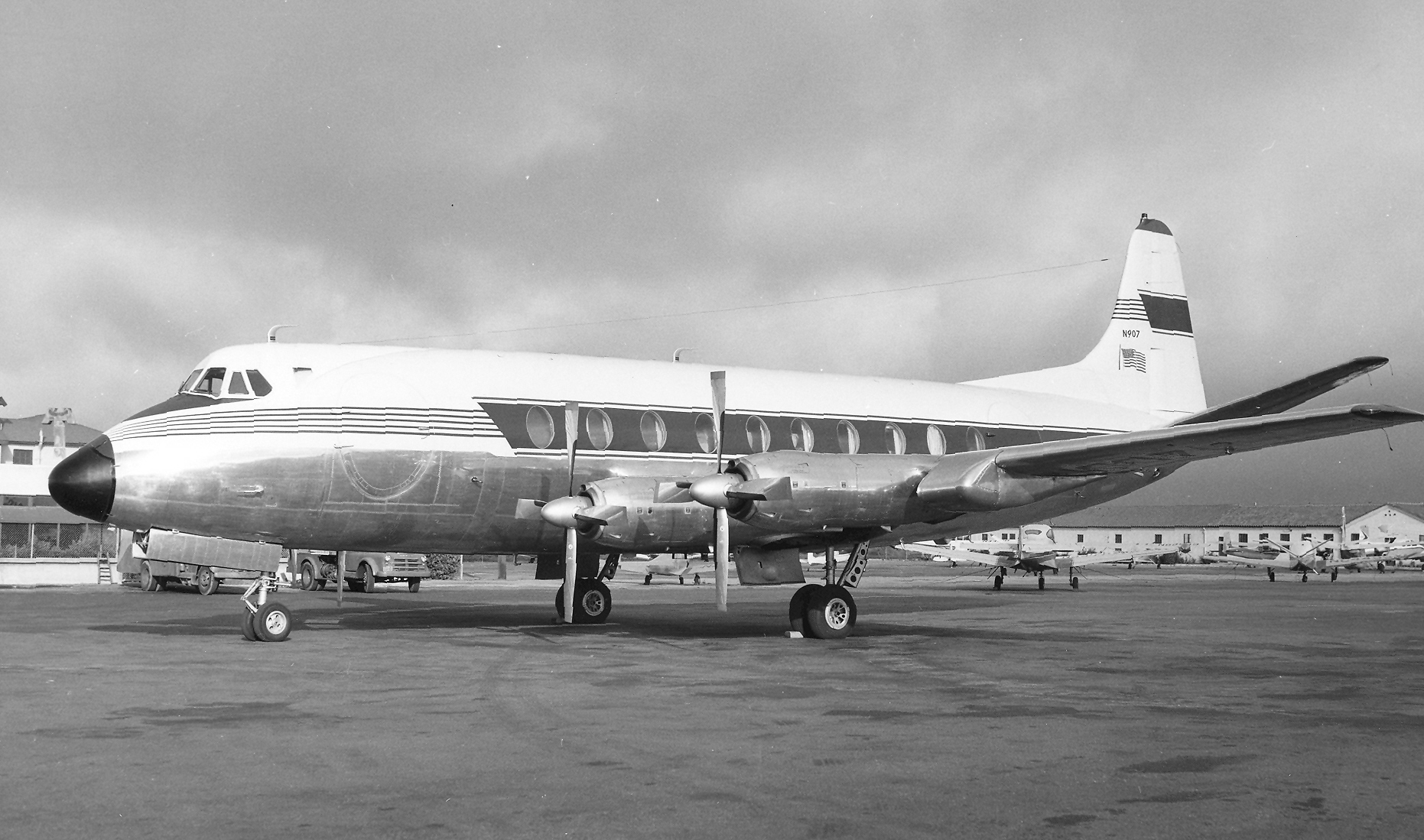
A Vickers Viscount operated by U.S. Steel

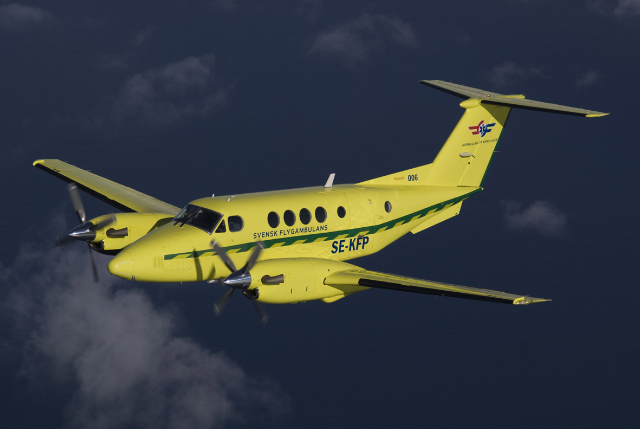
The Beech King Air and Super King Air are the most popular turboprop business aircraft with 7,300 deliveries as of May 2018

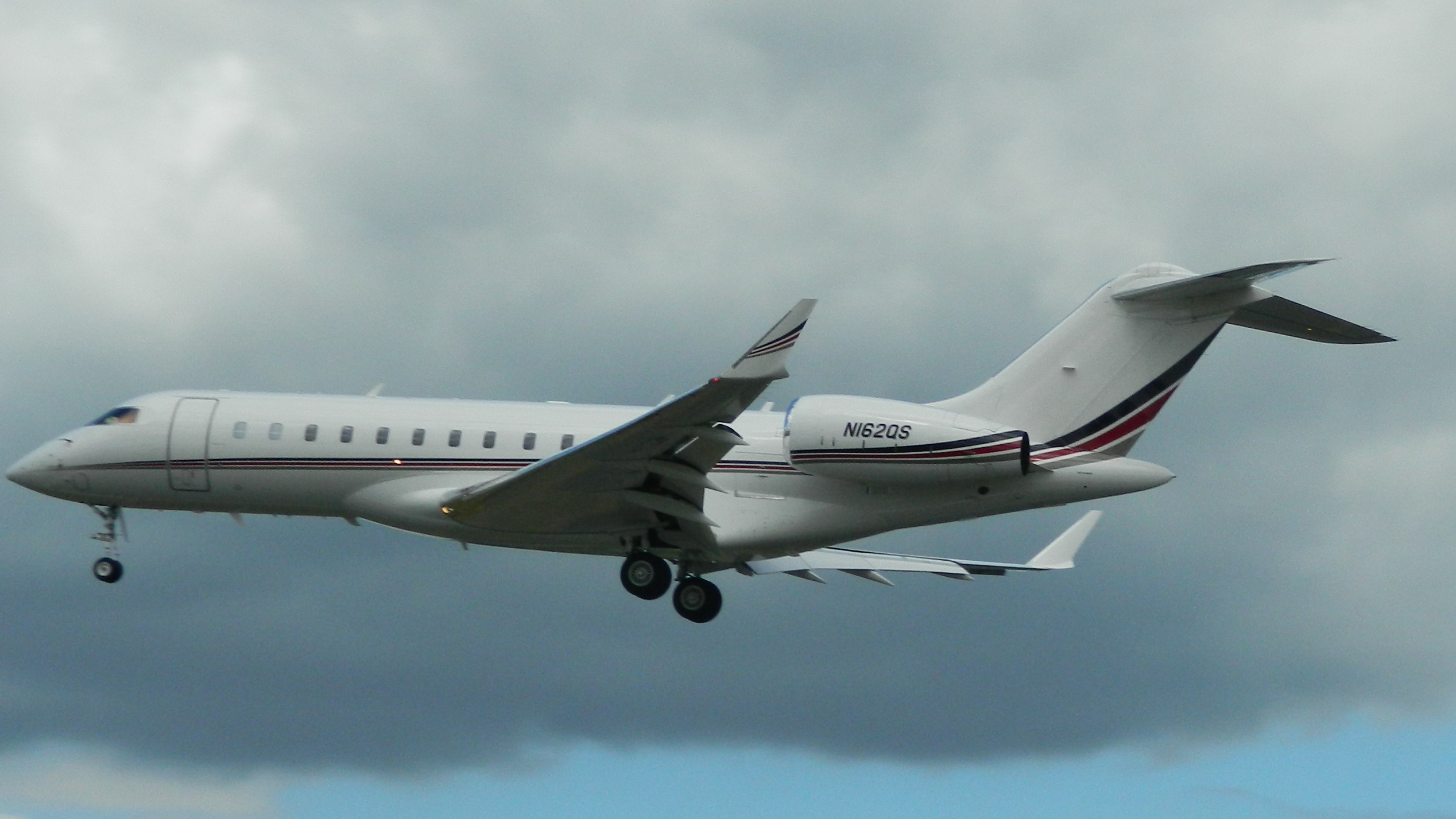
Bombardier Global 6000

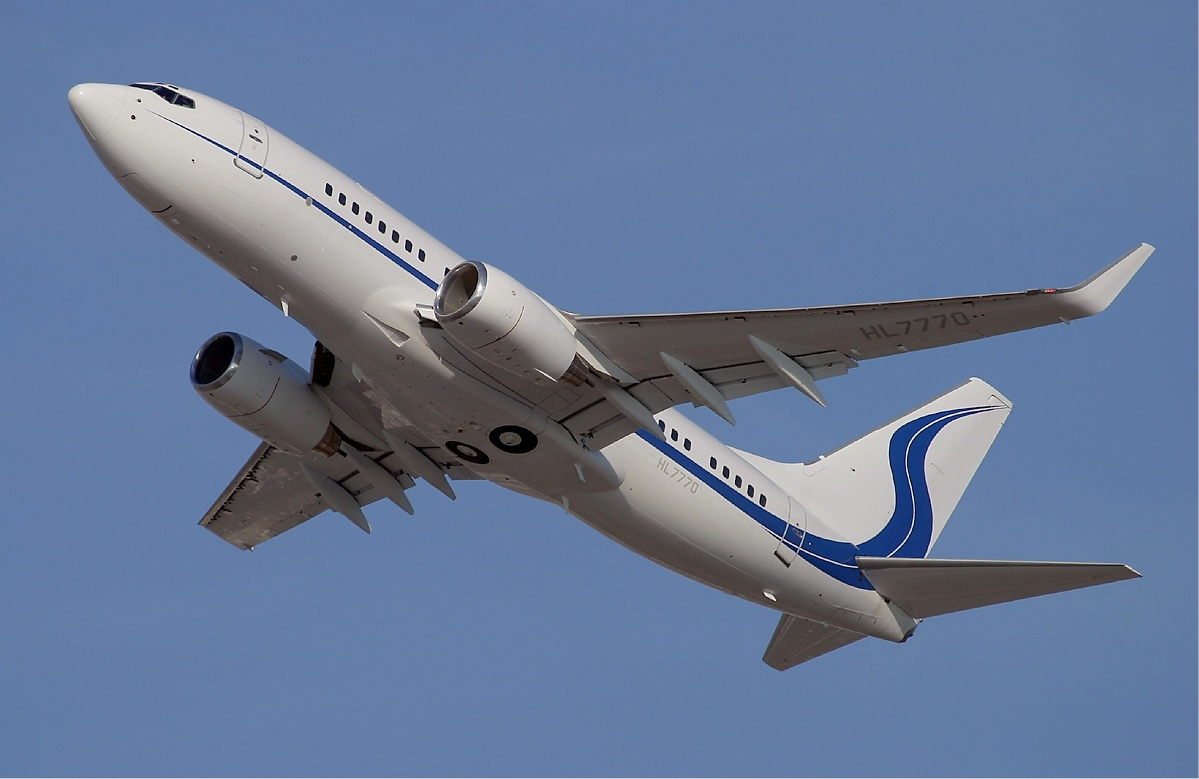
A Boeing BBJ 737 operated by Samsung

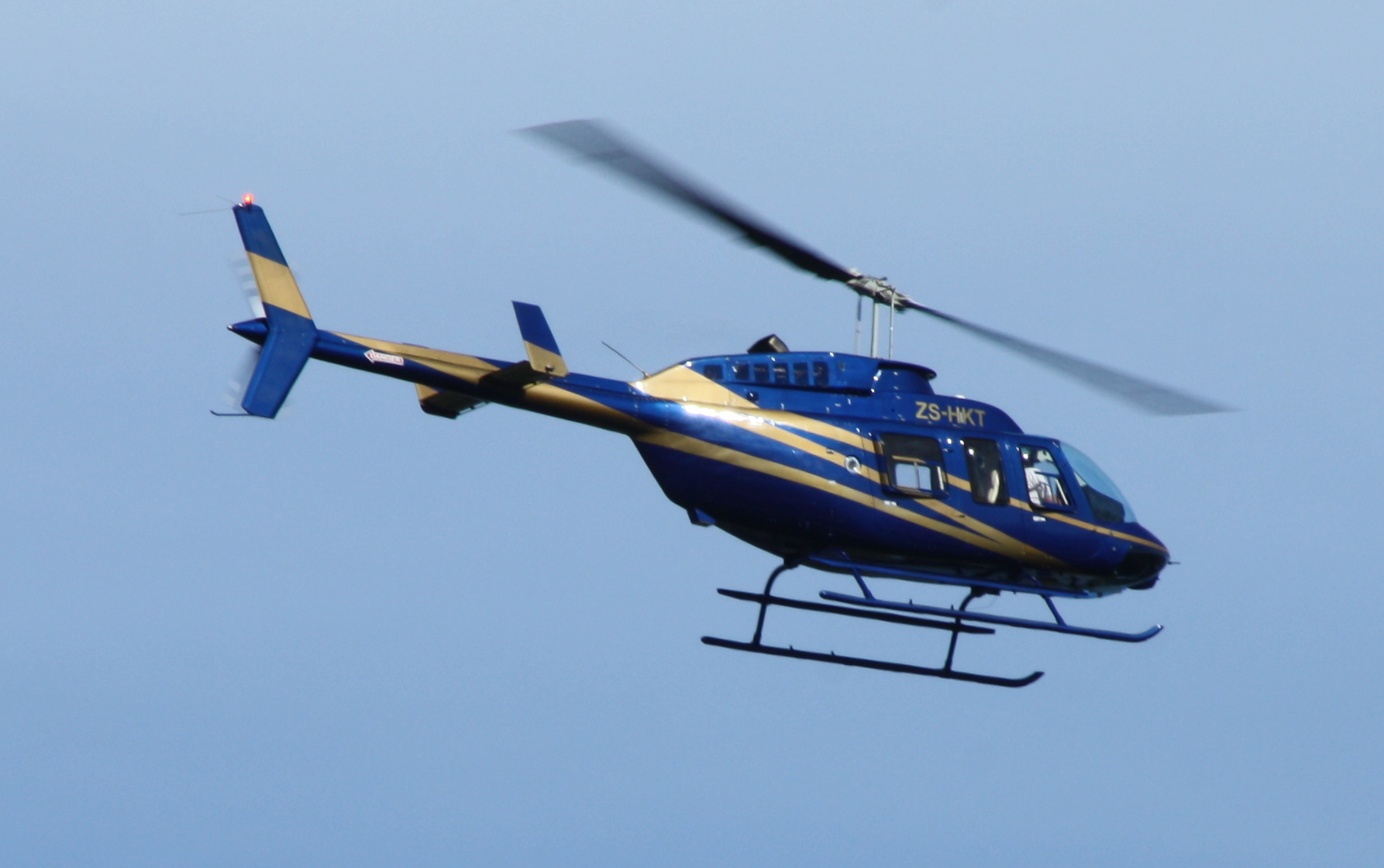
A Bell LongRanger operated by Land Link Real Estate in New Zealand

Business aircraft are aircraft typically used by companies and corporations to transport people or goods related to the needs of said businesses. Most business aircraft are general aviation aircraft variants of piston or turboprop or business jets.

== General aviation ==
=== Piston ===
With the growth of general aviation in the 1930s companies started to purchase single and twin-engined aircraft for business use.

A need to move goods and equipment made use of different general aviation aircraft and surplus military transports. In 1963 in the United Kingdom the Maidenhead Organ Studios purchased a twin-engined Beagle B.206 to allow them to deliver electronic organs.

=== Turboprop ===
For the first half of 2018, while business jets deliveries were relatively flat, new turboprops were up 10%, pressurized ones were up 12%, and King Airs were up 30%. Charter membership Wheels Up, operated by Gama Aviation, saw its flight hours surge by 18% and expanded its fleet from 99 to 117 with most of the new aircraft being examples of the Beechcraft King Air 350i. From a fleet of 63 King Airs in 2017, Wheels Up is aiming for a fleet of 1,000 serving 75,000 members in North America and Europe by 2030.

The first single-engine business turboprop was the 300 kn (560 km/h), 700 hp (520 kW) Socata TBM first delivered in August 1990, followed by the 1,200 hp (890 kW) Pilatus PC-12 certificated in March 1994 with a larger cabin than a King Air 200. Piper was next with the cheaper, 500 hp (370 kW) Piper Meridian M500 debuted in September 2000, then the 600 hp (450 kW) M600, and the Epic E1000, faster than the TBM, and the Cessna Denali, competing with the PC-12, should follow soon. By May 2019, more than 3,000 single turboprops had been delivered: over 780 TBMs, over 1,600 PC-12s and over 700 turboprop Meridians.

=== Jet engine ===
The first jet aircraft to be used as a business aircraft was the four-seat Morane-Saulnier MS.760 Paris based on military requirements as a liaison aircraft. It was followed by the four-engined Lockheed JetStar in 1957, although it was also designed to meet military requirements it was ordered by corporations like Gulf Oil, Continental Oil and Ford Motor Company. It was later followed in the mid-sixties by bespoke business jets like the six passenger Learjet 23 and the eight-passenger De Havilland DH.125.

They were followed in 1966 by larger 19-seat aircraft like the Gulfstream II based on the earlier turboprop Gulfstream I. The first generation of business jets provided speed and altitude but not the range and comfort that a larger cabin volume would give. Early Gulfstream IIs were delivered to Coca-Cola Company and Gillete. The first single-engine jet used for business use was the Cirrus Vision SF50, first delivered in December 2016.

== Airliners ==
Companies also operate airliners or freight aircraft, either new aircraft such as the Boeing BBJ family or former airliners like the Boeing 727 or Boeing 757.

== Helicopters ==
With the introduction of more reliable helicopters at the end of the Second World War like the Bell 47 companies started to purchase them for executive and staff travel.
