= Epic LT =

Turboprop homebuilt aircraft type

Epic LT & Dynasty
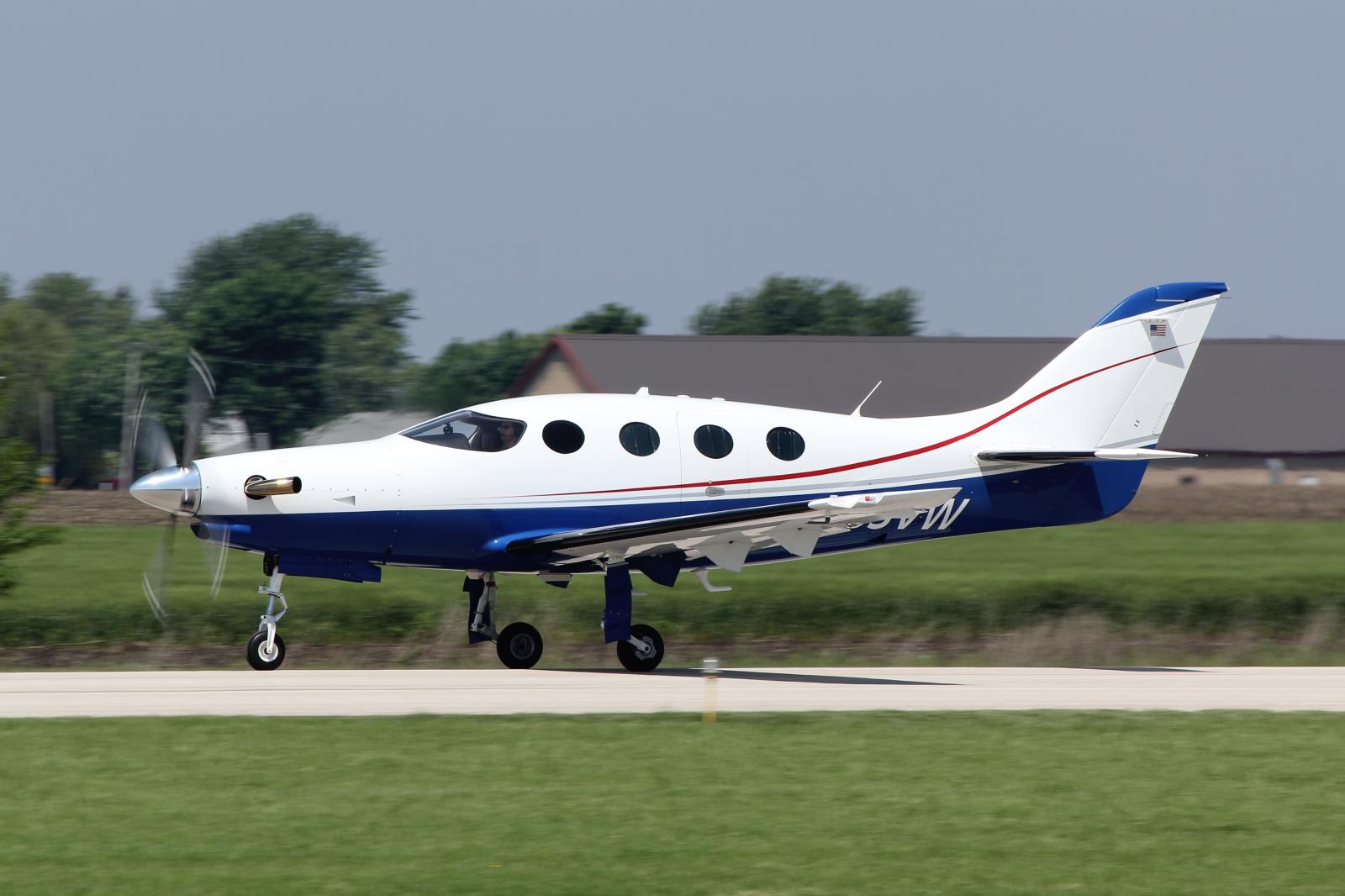

General information
- Type: Single engine turboprop light aircraft
- National origin: United States
- Manufacturer: Epic Aircraft
- Status: Production resumed in 2010
- Number built: 54

History
- Manufactured: 2004–2009; 2010–2018
- First flight: 2004
- Variants: CAIGA Primus 150; Epic E1000

The Epic LT is an American kit-built single-engined turboprop aircraft intended for use by private pilots. The Epic Dynasty was the proposed certified version of the LT that was intended be sold as a completed aircraft, prior to Epic Aircraft's bankruptcy in August 2009 and later acquisition by new owners in April 2010. Under ownership of the reorganized company, the certified version is called the Epic E1000. After FAA certification in 2019, deliveries began in 2020.

== Development ==
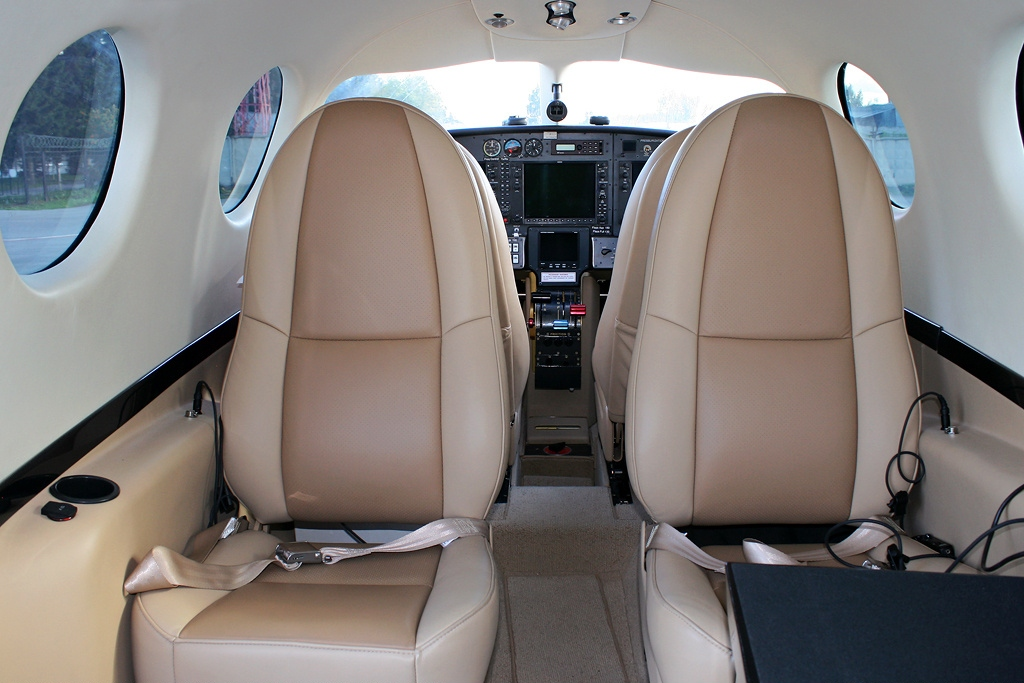
Interior accommodation

The LT was designed by Epic Air LLC of Bend, Oregon, to meet demand for a kit-built high-performance single turboprop-engined six-seat private owner aircraft. It has a low-wing layout with the tailplanes mid-set on a single fin. The tricycle undercarriage is fully retractable. Its construction uses composites incorporating carbon fibres. The engine is a Pratt & Whitney PT6-67A turboprop flat rated to 1200 hp.

The prototype LT first flew in 2004.

The prototype Dynasty, Epic LT number 14, had logged over 1000 hours of certification flight testing by 23 October 2006, but certification was not complete in June 2009, with the company reporting over 2000 test hours flown.

Flight testing of the prototype, registered C-FJRQ, was initially commenced in Calgary, Alberta, Canada, but the aircraft was removed from the Canadian register on 2 March 2007. It was moved back to Bend, Oregon, and re-registered as N6XK.

Sales stopped in 2012, to be replaced by the certificated Epic E1000, and the 54th and final kit had secured its certificate of airworthiness in December 2018, before its early 2019 delivery to its owner.

It is the basis of the China Aviation Industry General Aircraft Primus 150.

== Operational history ==
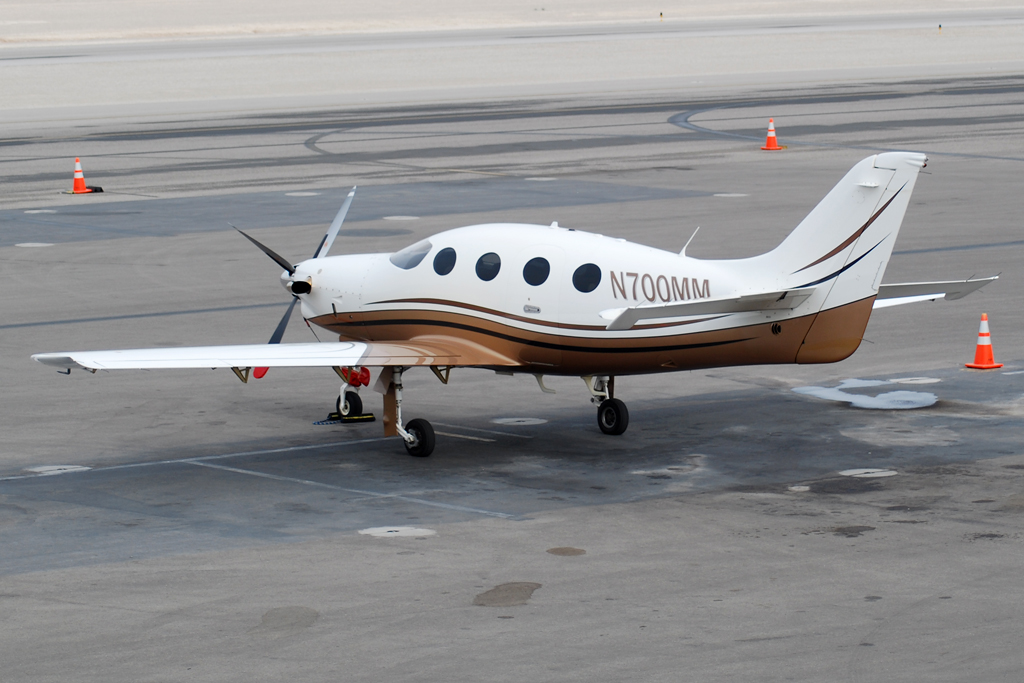
Rear view

Deliveries of LT kits commenced in 2006 with the first one completed that year and the aircraft was demonstrated at the EAA show at Oshkosh, Wisconsin, in July 2007.

Initially, the LT aircraft kits were completed by amateur builders under factory supervision in the factory at Bend but some later examples have been assembled at field locations, with assistance from Epic Aircraft.

On 7 July 2016, six Epic LT kit-built aircraft departed on a global circumnavigation flight, flown by owner-pilots. They departed from the AirVenture 2016 airshow, in Oshkosh, Wisconsin.

== Variants ==
Epic LT
Experimental homebuilt version
Epic E1000
Certified version planned for production in 2019 at a unit cost of $3.25 million
CAIGA Primus 150
CAIGA International version

== Accidents and incidents ==
A total of two Epic LT accidents have been reported by the US National Transportation Safety Board.

On 31 March 2019, an Epic LT, registration RA-2151G, crashed in a field on approach to Frankfurt Egelsbach Airport in southwestern Germany at about 3:30 p.m. Russian S7 Airlines co-owner Natalia Fileva, one of Russia's richest women, her father and the pilot died in the crash.

== Specifications (LT/Dynasty) ==
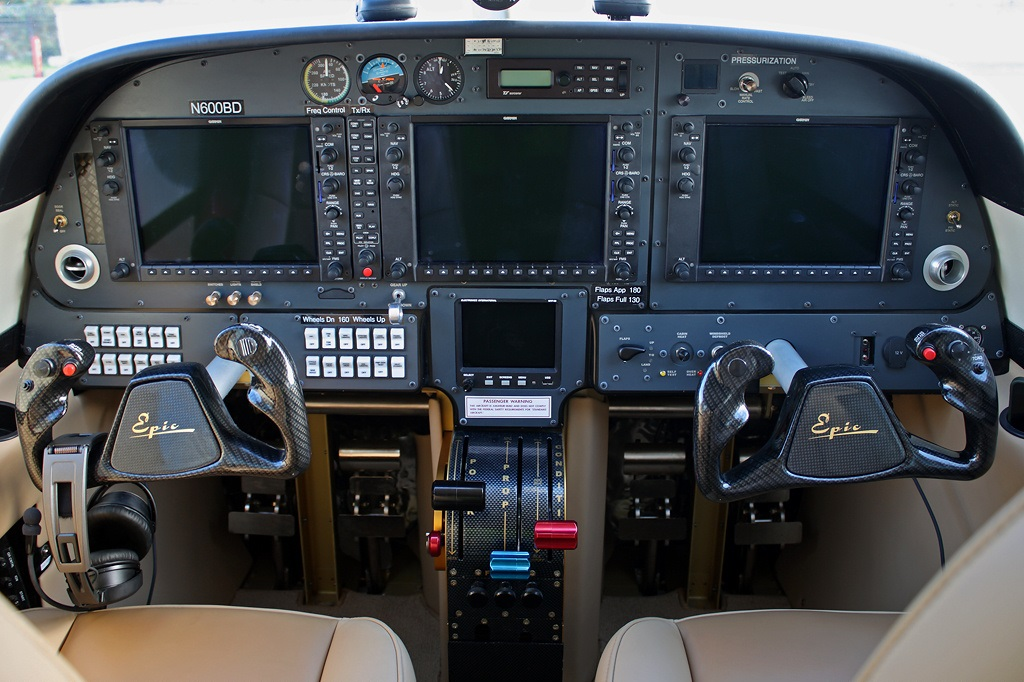
Flight deck

Data from Epic Website

General characteristics

- Crew: one
- Capacity: five passengers
- Length: 35 ft 10 in (10.92 m)
- Wingspan: 43 ft (13 m)
- Height: 12 ft 6 in (3.81 m)
- Wing area: 203.6 sq ft (18.92 m^{2})
- Empty weight: 4,000 lb (1,814 kg)
- Gross weight: 7,300 lb (3,311 kg)
- Fuel capacity: 288 US gallons (1090 L) standard, 350 US gallons (1324 L) optional
- Powerplant: 1 × Pratt & Whitney PT6-67A turboprop, 1,200 shp (890 kW)

Performance

- Cruise speed: 340 kn (390 mph, 630 km/h) max cruise
- Range: 1,874 nmi (2,157 mi, 3,471 km) with optional long range tanks
- Service ceiling: 31,000 ft (9,400 m)
- Time to altitude: 9 minutes to 25,000 ft (7620 m)

== See also ==
- Extra EA-500
- Kestrel K-350
- Pilatus PC-12
- Piper Meridian
- SOCATA TBM 900
