= Natalia Fileva =

Russian businesswoman (1963–2019)

- Born: November 27, 1963; Novosibirsk, Russian SFSR, USSR
- Died: March 31, 2019 (aged 55); Frankfurt Egelsbach Airport, Germany
- Education: Novosibirsk State Technical University
- Occupation: Businesswoman

Natalia Valerievna Fileva (Russian: Наталия Валерьевна Филёва; 27 November 1963 – 31 March 2019) was a Russian businesswoman and chairman of the board of directors of S7 Airlines. In 2018, Forbes listed her as the fourth richest woman in Russia, with a worth estimated at US$600 million. She died in a plane crash in Germany in 2019.

== Career and personal life ==
Born in Novosibirsk, Fileva graduated from the Novosibirsk State Technical University with a degree in radio engineering and the Novosibirsk State University of Economics and Management with a degree in production management.

Fileva was married to Vladislav Filev, general director of S7 Airlines. They had three children.

== Death ==
On 31 March 2019, she was a passenger on an Epic LT, when it crashed in a field on approach to Frankfurt Egelsbach Airport, killing all the three people aboard, including her father.

Fileva was en route to a medical appointment in Frankfurt from France when the crash occurred. Two other people died when a police vehicle travelling to the scene of the crash collided with another car near the airport. The three police officers in the police car suffered serious injuries.
