= National Business Aviation Association =

Aviation organization

- Founded: 1947
- Type: Not for profit
- Headquarters: Washington, DC, United States
- Field: Aviation advocacy
- Website: nbaa.org

The National Business Aviation Association (NBAA) is a professional association and lobbying group for private business aviation.

== Overview ==
NBAA is set up as a 501(c)(6) non-profit entity. NBAA organizes conferences and seminars.

Edward M. Bolen has been the president and CEO of NBAA since September 7, 2004. The organization's Board of Directors includes Chairman Lloyd Newton of L3 Technologies, Inc. and Vice Chair/Treasurer Elizabeth Dornak of DuPont Aviation.

=== Opposition to air traffic control privatization ===
NBAA's public policy initiatives in 2018 centered on the organization's opposition to air traffic control privatization. The matter was debated in 2018 as part of the U.S. Federal Aviation Administration's (FAA) congressional reauthorization process. Various proposals for extracting and privatizing air traffic control (ATC) were debated. NBAA's opposition to ATC privatization was motivated by the potential lack of representation on the AANS board (the proposed directors who would oversee a privatized ATC system). "Critics say that, given where the members are drawn from, the board would end up controlled by airline-related interests. They worry that the focus would accordingly be on the major airline corridors, with rural airports and users becoming second-class (or maybe third- or fourth-class) citizens." Ultimately, the FAA reauthorization was passed without including any ATC privatization measures.

=== Taxation ===
The organization supported tax rules in the 2017 Tax Cuts and Jobs Act for deduction of business aircraft costs in the first year (also known as "immediate expensing").

In 2024, the NBAA opposed an Internal Revenue Service crackdown on tax write-offs for private jet travel.

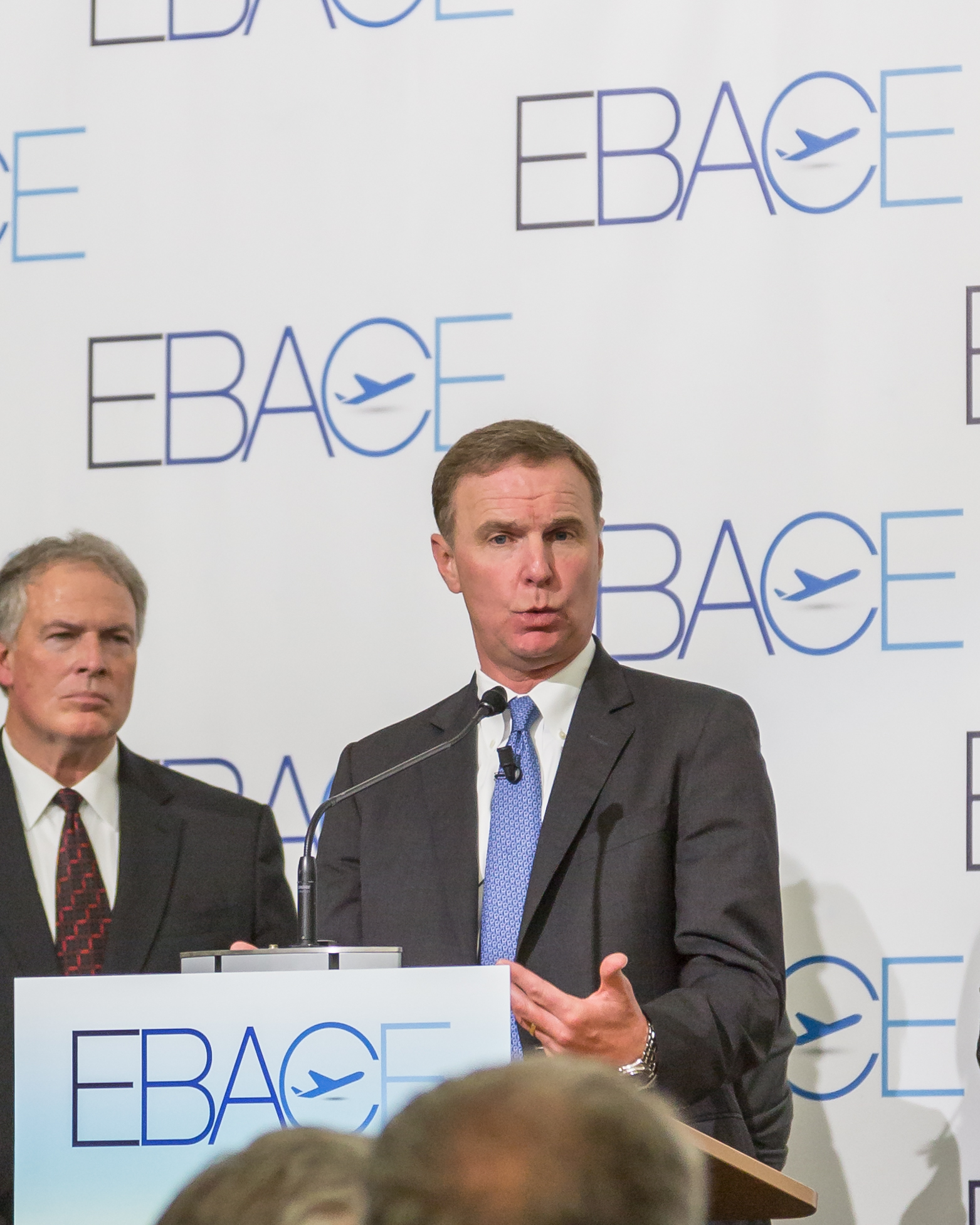
CEO Ed Bolen at EBACE 2018

== NBAA Meritorious Service to Aviation Award ==
The NBAA Meritorious Service to Aviation Award is an American award in aviation given annually since 1950 by the NBAA.

Past winners include:

- Senator Barry M. Goldwater
- William P. Lear Sr.
- Juan Trippe
- Henry B. Du Pont
- Lt. Gen. James H. Doolittle
- Eddie Rickenbacker
- Charles Lindbergh
- Arthur Godfrey
- Allen E. Paulson
