= Epic E1000 =

Single-engine turboprop developed by Epic Aircraft

E1000
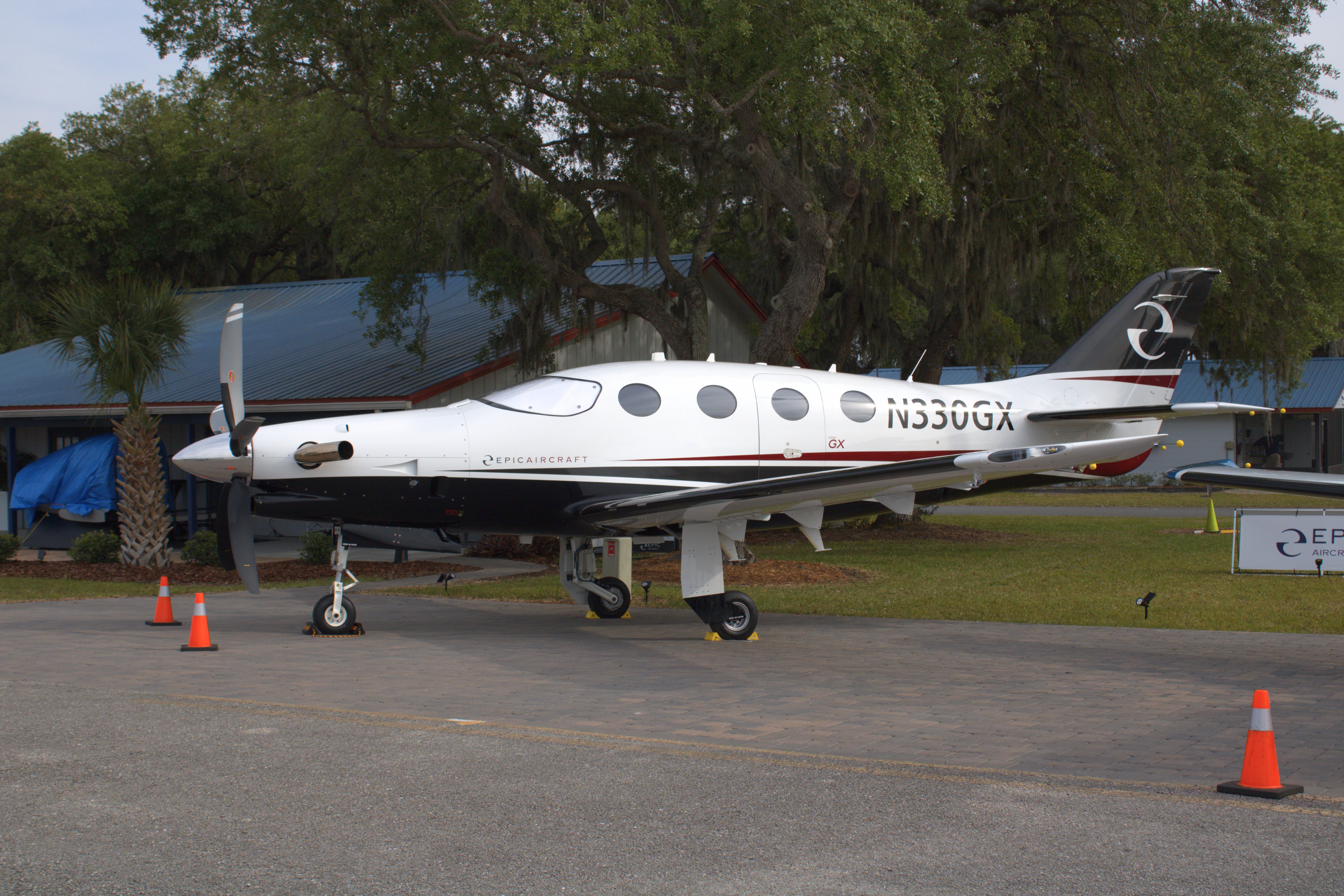
- Epic E1000 GX at 2024 Sun 'n Fun

General information
- Type: Light aircraft
- National origin: United States
- Manufacturer: Epic Aircraft
- Status: In production
- Number built: 100 (as of Sept. 2025)

History
- Manufactured: 2020–present
- Introduction date: February 2020
- First flight: 19 December 2015
- Developed from: Epic LT

The Epic E1000 is an American single-engine, six-seat, turboprop light aircraft developed by Epic Aircraft of Bend, Oregon.

== Design ==
A development of the kit-built Epic LT, the E1000 aircraft features a cantilever low-wing, a 6.5 psi (45 kPa) differential pressurized cabin with an airstair door just ahead of the rear seats, retractable tricycle landing gear and a single 1,825 hp (1,361 kW) Pratt & Whitney Canada PT6-67A turboprop aircraft engine, de-rated to 1,200 hp (890 kW) in tractor configuration. The aircraft is predominantly made from carbon fiber and its 43 ft (13.1 m) span wing has flaps and winglets.

The aircraft has a goal empty weight of 4,400 lb (2,000 kg) and a gross weight of 7,500 lb (3,400 kg), giving a useful load of 3,100 lb (1,400 kg) and a full-fuel payload of 1,100 lb (500 kg), allowing the fuel tanks and seats to all be filled. Preliminary performance data shows a 325 kn (602 km/h; 374 mph) maximum airspeed, 1,650nmi (3,050 km) range, 45 gal/h (170 L/h) fuel consumption at cruise altitude, and a 34,000 ft (10,000 m) operating ceiling.

== Development ==
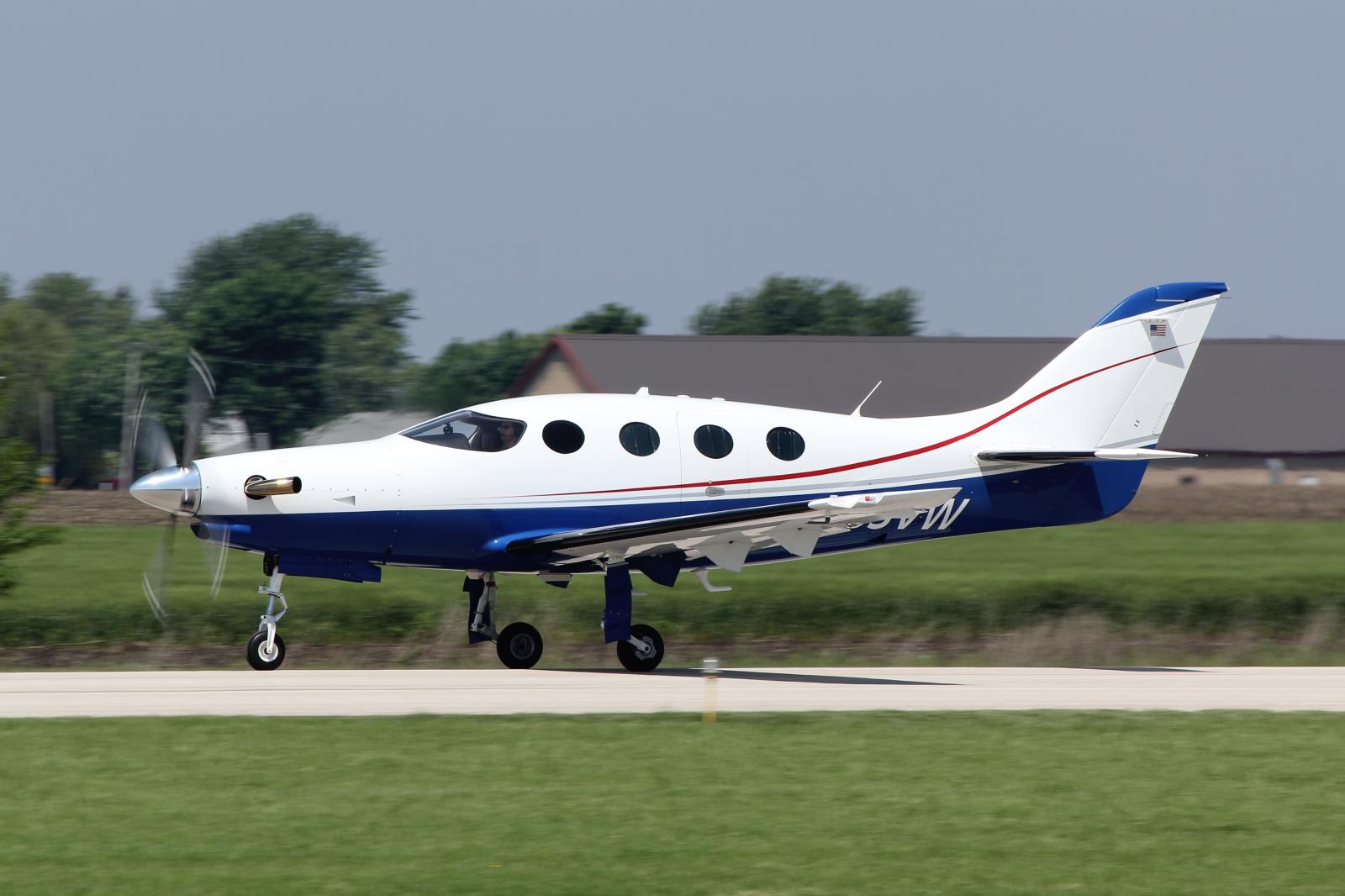
The E1000 was developed from the pictured Epic LT kit plane

In 2013, the E1000 was launched, intended to be a type certificated, upgraded Epic LT kit plane. In 2014, Epic stopped selling the kit plane, the 54th and final one was delivered in the second quarter of 2019.

In February 2014, Epic had ten orders for the type and initial deliveries were targeted for the second half of 2015. In early 2014, the design was forecast for its first flight in June 2015, with certification then expected later in 2015. By October 2014, it had 60 orders and Epic targeted 50 sales per year. In October 2014, the manufacturer introduced the interior design which includes features such as club seating, adjustable tray tables in the cabin sidewalls, pockets large enough to stow a tablet computer, USB power outlets, cup holders and light-emitting diode light switches. The Garmin G1000 navigation system will include a synthetic vision system. It includes SPD-Smart Electronically Dimmable Window (EDW) Systems.

In 2015, certification slipped to 2016. and the company forecast commencing deliveries in 2016, as well.

The E1000 first flew on 19 December 2015 and Epic reported "more than" 60 orders. In May 2016, the first conforming prototype was under construction and certification was then expected to be completed in the fourth quarter of 2016, with customer deliveries forecast for early 2017.

In October 2017, Epic reported 76 outstanding orders of the US$3.25M aircraft. The first prototype had accumulated 400 hours, while the production-conforming second prototype was nearing first flight. Russian-owned Epic was hoping at that time to complete type certification in 2018. The second prototype flew in January 2018.

In 2018, the company hoped to convert its 85 reservations into firm orders and planned a production capacity of 50 aircraft per year. By 2018, the company had 250 employees, enough funds for certification and the initial production years. Eight to 12 aircraft are planned to be delivered in 2019, 24 in 2020, 36 in 2021 and 50 thereafter, with an ultimate market forecast of 80 to 90 units per year. The fuselage was tested to 18 psi (120 kPa) differential, nearly three times its normal 6.6 psi (46 kPa) pressurization differential, while the wing was tested to 19,044 lb (8,638 kg), deflecting 31 in (79 cm). By September 2018, after 700 hours of flight tests, Epic Aircraft maintained it would achieve its year-end type certification goal, with production certification following six months later. By November 2018, the two prototypes had accumulated 800 hours and Epic expected US type inspection authorization in December for an early 2019 type certification and deliveries soon after, a two-year delay from earlier forecasts. The final Epic LT kit plane was completed in June 2019.

In November 2019, the design was FAA type certificated after a seven-year development effort, with the two prototypes completing more than 1,000 hours of flight testing. Initial customer deliveries against the existing 80 aircraft on order were planned before the end of 2019. After delays imposed by the COVID-19 pandemic, in July 2020 the company received its FAA production certificate for the aircraft.

The first aircraft was delivered in February 2020 before being leased back to Epic to support engineering projects, and the second aircraft was delivered in May. In 2023, its equipped price was $4.45M.

In December 2023, Epic Aircraft announced that the FAA has granted Flight Into Known Icing (FIKI) certification for its high-performance E1000 GX turboprop. This milestone follows years of rigorous testing, including 450+ flight hours and extensive icing wind tunnel tests. The E1000 GX's de-icing system features advanced components like de-ice boots, heated windshields, and optical ice detectors. Starting in 2024, new deliveries will include FIKI upgrades, with retrofits for existing aircraft expected by early 2025.

== Operational history ==
In July 2020 the E1000 was named as the winner of Flying magazine's 2020 Innovation Award. Flying's Editor-in-Chief Julie Boatman, noted the aircraft's deliveries starting during the COVID-19 pandemic, "we’re really pleased to be in a position to award the 2020 Innovation Award to Epic Aircraft for the phenomenal job that you’ve done, not just bringing the aircraft to certification over a couple of decades, but also in the midst of everything that we’ve been going through over the last 4 months now, to continue pushing forward, to get those first deliveries out the door, and into the hands of some extremely happy pilots".

== Specifications (E1000) ==
Data from Epic Aircraft

General characteristics

- Crew: one
- Capacity: five passengers
- Length: 35 ft 10 in (10.92 m)
- Wingspan: 43 ft (13 m)
- Height: 12 ft 6 in (3.81 m)
- Wing area: 203 sq ft (18.9 m^{2})
- Aspect ratio: 9.11
- Empty weight: 4,600 lb (2,087 kg)
- Gross weight: 8,000 lb (3,629 kg)
- Fuel capacity: 288 U.S. gal (1,090 L; 240 imp gal)
- Full fuel payload: 1,100 lb (499 kg)
- Cabin pressurization: 6.6 psi (46 kPa)
- Cabin length × width × height: 15×4.6×4.9 ft (4.6×1.4×1.5 m)
- Powerplant: 1 × Pratt & Whitney Canada PT6A-67 turboprop, 1,200 hp (890 kW)
- Propellers: 4-bladed Hartzell Propeller Full Reversing

Performance

- Maximum speed: 333 kn (383 mph, 617 km/h) Max cruise
- Cruise speed: 265 kn (305 mph, 491 km/h) Eco cruise
- Range: 1,385–1,650 nmi (1,594–1,899 mi, 2,565–3,056 km) max cruise-eco cruise
- Service ceiling: 34,000 ft (10,000 m)
- Maximum glide ratio: 17.5:1
- Rate of climb: 4,000 ft/min (20 m/s) best
- Time to altitude: 15 minutes to 34,000 feet
- Rate of sink: 700–800 ft/min (3.6–4.1 m/s)
- Wing loading: 39.4 lb/sq ft (192 kg/m^{2})
- Power/mass: 6.67 lb/hp (4.06 kg/kW)

Avionics

- Garmin G1000 NXi 3-Screen
