= Cirrus VK-30 =

Single-engine pusher-propeller homebuilt aircraft

VK-30
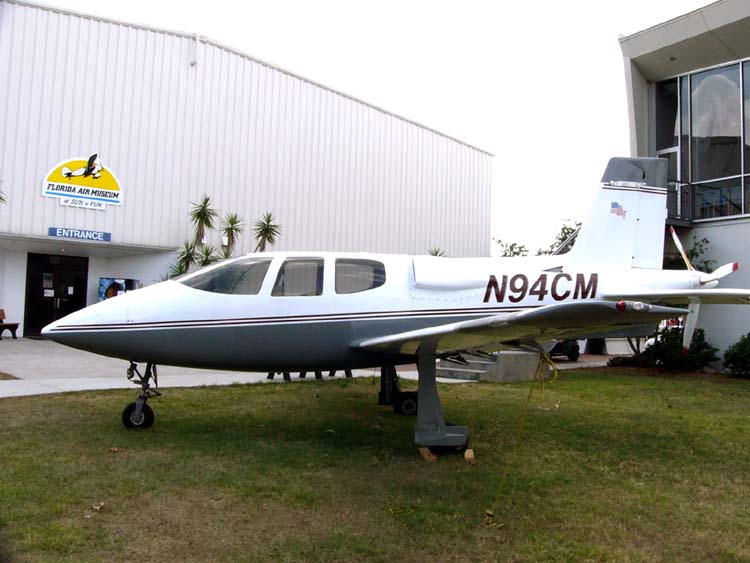
- Cirrus VK-30 outside the Florida Air Museum in 2006

General information
- Type: Amateur-built airplane
- National origin: United States
- Manufacturer: Cirrus Design
- Designer: Alan and Dale Klapmeier, Jeff Viken
- Number built: Circa 13

History
- Manufactured: 1988–1993
- Introduction date: 1987
- First flight: 11 February 1988

The Cirrus VK-30 is a single-engine pusher-propeller homebuilt aircraft originally sold as a kit by Cirrus Design (now Cirrus Aircraft), and was the company's first model, introduced in 1987.

As a kit aircraft, the VK-30 is a relatively obscure design with few completed aircraft flying. Its most important legacy is that the work done on developing and marketing the aircraft convinced the designers, the Klapmeier brothers, that the best way to proceed in the future was with a more conventional layout and with a certified production aircraft. Thus the lessons of the VK-30 were directly responsible for the design of the Cirrus SR20 and SR22, which have been the best-selling general aviation airplanes in the world every year since 2003. The VK-30 also served as a significant inspiration for the creation of the company's latest aircraft, the Cirrus Vision Jet, which in 2018 won the Collier Trophy for becoming the first single-engine personal jet with a whole-plane parachute recovery system.

== Design and development ==
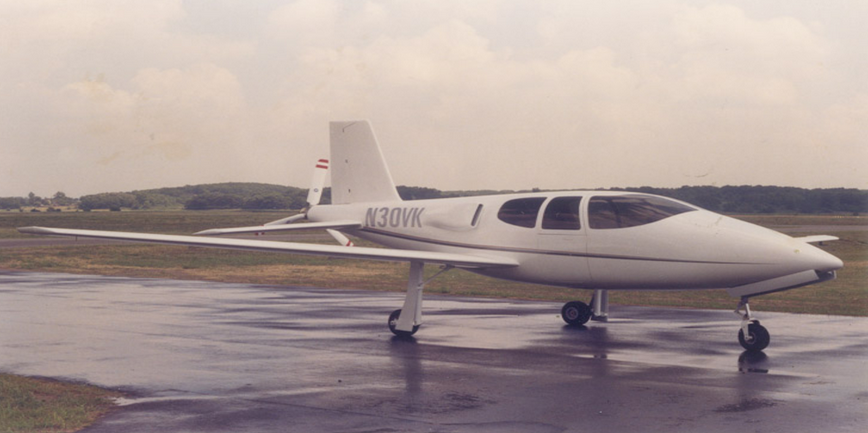
Cirrus Design VK-30 on ramp at the Baraboo–Wisconsin Dells Airport in Baraboo, Wisconsin, c. 1988

The VK-30 design was conceived in the early 1980s as a kit plane project by three Wisconsin college students: Alan Klapmeier and Jeff Viken from Ripon College, and Alan's younger brother, Dale Klapmeier, who was attending the University of Wisconsin–Stevens Point. Together after college, in the Klapmeier brothers' parents' dairy barn in rural Sauk County, Wisconsin, they formed Cirrus Design in 1984 as the company to produce the VK-30 ("VK" standing for Viken-Klapmeier). Jeff's wife, Sally Viken, designed the aircraft's flap system. During the kit's early developmental phase, the Klapmeiers and Vikens sought frequent help and advice from homebuilt innovator Molt Taylor, who specialized in pusher configurations dating back to the 1940s.

The aircraft has an all-composite construction and was designed to achieve natural laminar flow over the fuselage, wing and tail surfaces to provide for very low drag—using a NASA NLF(1)-0414F airfoil designed by Jeff Viken. The original prototype incorporated scrapped parts from production aircraft out of junkyards the Klapmeier brothers visited in order to reduce cost, including both a control system and nose landing gear from a Piper Cherokee (welding parts onto it to convert it to a retractable gear), as well as an O-540 (290 hp) engine off a wrecked de Havilland Heron. The VK-30 was designed to be a five-seat aircraft from the start, which made it considerably larger than most other amateur-built aircraft of its day. It incorporated a mid-engine design, driving a three-bladed pusher propeller behind the tail through an extension shaft. The powerplant in later models was a Continental IO-550-G piston engine developing 300 hp (224 kW).

The Klapmeiers first introduced the VK-30 at the 1987 EAA AirVenture Oshkosh convention in Oshkosh, Wisconsin. The aircraft's first flight was made on 11 February 1988 at the Baraboo–Wisconsin Dells Airport in Baraboo, Wisconsin, by Jim Patton, a test pilot who Jeff Viken knew from NASA Langley. Kit deliveries commenced at AirVenture 1988. Jeff and Sally Viken left the company that same year.

In the late 1980s, the Klapmeier brothers approached jet engine manufacturer Williams International about the possibility of installing a small, single Williams FJ44 turbofan engine on the VK-30. The idea never materialized at that time, however, it significantly inspired the original design concept of the Vision Jet in the mid-2000s.

Cirrus discontinued production of the aircraft in 1993, and in 1996, announced plans to develop a stronger replacement wing for about 28 VK-30s supplied to past customers.

== Operational history ==
Cirrus delivered about 40 kits, and built four additional factory prototypes. The company estimated that there were 13 customer VK-30s completed. As of 11 February 2018, four were still registered with the Federal Aviation Administration in the US, although at one time a total of 12 had been registered.

== Variants ==
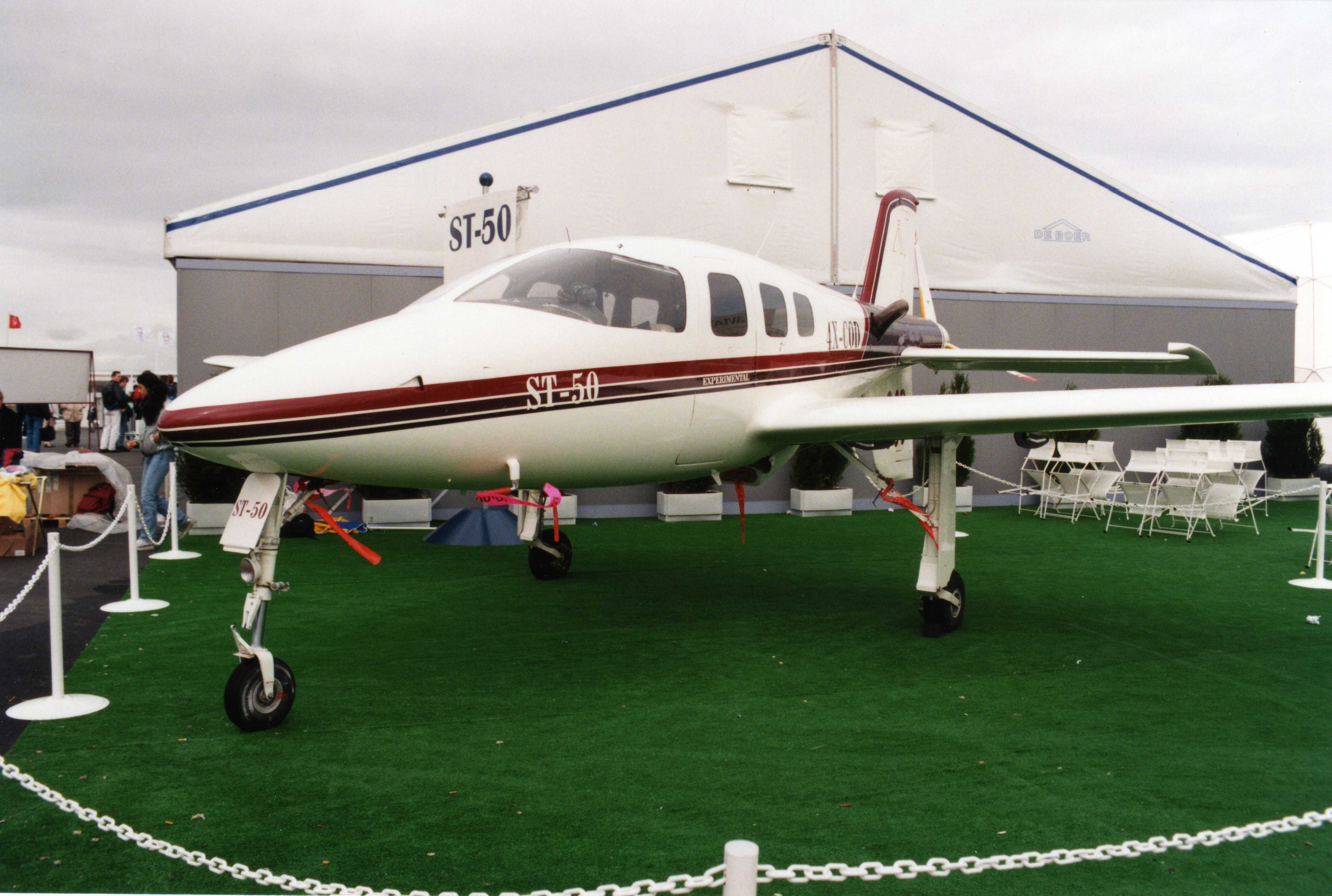
Cirrus-Israviation ST50 at the Paris Air Show in 1997

Cirrus/Israviation ST50

The VK-30 was the predecessor of the Cirrus ST-50, which had an almost-identical configuration to the VK-30, but included a larger ventral fin on the tail of the aircraft, a slightly larger fuselage, and was powered by a Pratt & Whitney Canada PT6-135 turboprop engine in place of the piston engine used in the VK-30. Cirrus designed and initially developed the aircraft under contract to an Israeli aircraft manufacturer named Israviation, and first flew it in Duluth, Minnesota in 1994. Isravation attempted to certify and market the ST-50 in the proceeding years but it never entered production by the company. Ultimately only two ST-50 models were built.

== Accidents ==
Between 1990 and 2020, seven US-registered VK-30s crashed, with a total of ten fatalities.

On 22 March 1996, retired astronaut Robert F. Overmyer died at age 59 in the crash of an Allison turbine-powered VK-30. He was testing the aircraft for stall recovery characteristics at aft center of gravity limits when the aircraft departed controlled flight.

== Aircraft on display ==
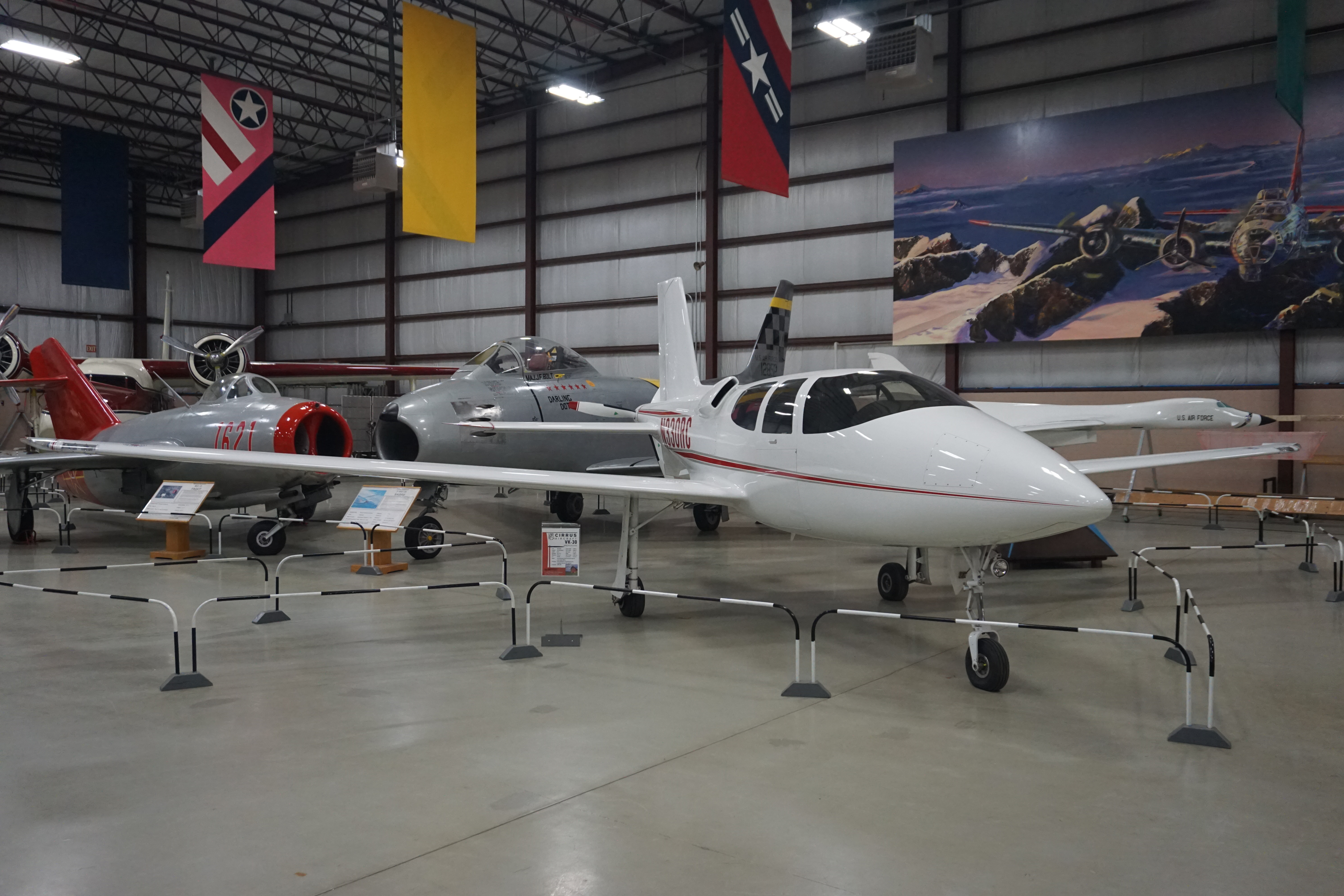
VK-30 on display at the Air Zoo in 2019

- Air Zoo, Portage, Michigan
- EAA AirVenture Museum, Oshkosh, Wisconsin
- Florida Air Museum, Lakeland, Florida

== Specifications (VK-30) ==
Data from EAA AirVenture Museum

General characteristics

- Crew: One (pilot)
- Capacity: Four passengers
- Length: 26 ft (7.9 m)
- Wingspan: 39 ft 8 in (12.09 m)
- Height: 10 ft 8 in (3.25 m)
- Wing area: 126 sq ft (11.7 m^{2})
- Empty weight: 2,400 lb (1,089 kg)
- Gross weight: 3,600 lb (1,633 kg)
- Max takeoff weight: 3,600 lb (1,633 kg)
- Powerplant: 1 × Continental IO-550-G horizontally opposed piston engine, 300 hp (220 kW)

Performance

- Maximum speed: 247 mph (398 km/h, 215 kn) at sea level
- Range: 1,300 mi (2,100 km, 1,100 nmi)
- Rate of climb: 1,500 ft/min (7.6 m/s)
- Wing loading: 28.6 lb/sq ft (140 kg/m^{2})

== See also ==
Related development

- Cirrus Vision SF50

Aircraft of comparable role, configuration, and era

- LearAvia Lear Fan
- Dickey E-Racer
- Grinvalds Orion

Related lists

- List of pusher aircraft by configuration
- List of civil aircraft
