= Cirrus Vision SF50 =

Very light business jet

Vision SF50
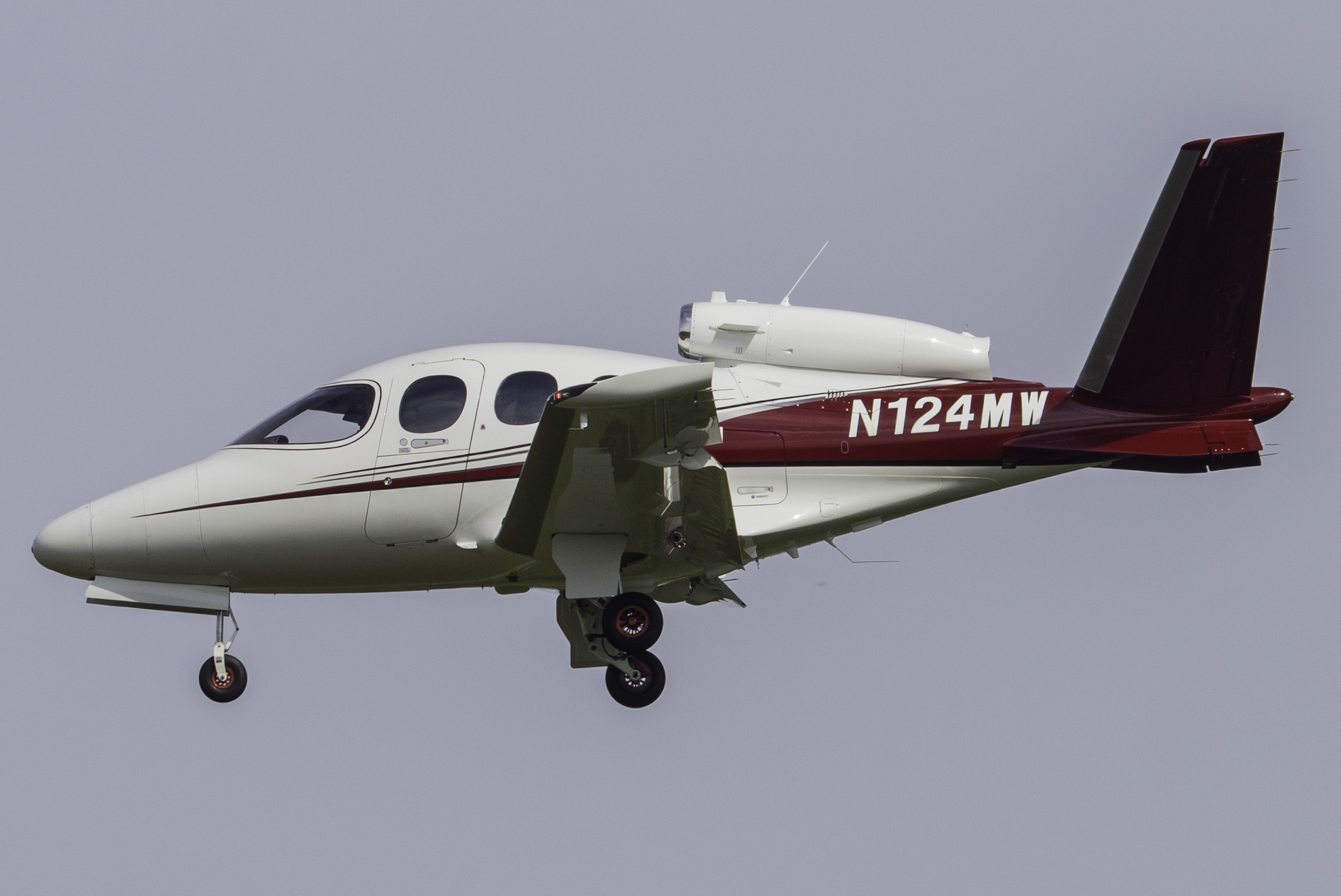
- The SF50 is a small business jet with a single aft-mounted turbofan, here with gear and flaps extended.

General information
- Type: Very light jet
- National origin: United States
- Manufacturer: Cirrus Aircraft
- Status: In production
- Number built: 721 delivered (as of December 2025)

History
- Manufactured: December 2016–present
- First flight: First prototype: 3 July 2008; Conforming prototype: 24 March 2014; First production: 5 May 2016

The Cirrus Vision SF50, also known as the Vision Jet, is a single-engine very light jet designed and produced by Cirrus Aircraft of Duluth, Minnesota, United States.

After receiving deposits starting in 2006, Cirrus unveiled an aircraft mock-up on 28 June 2007 and a prototype on 26 June 2008. It made its maiden flight on 3 July 2008. Development slowed in 2009 due to lack of funding. In 2011, Cirrus was bought by CAIGA, a Chinese enterprise that funded the project a year later. The first conforming prototype subsequently flew on 24 March 2014, followed by two other prototypes that same year. The test flying program resulted in the US Federal Aviation Administration awarding a type certificate on 28 October 2016. Deliveries started on 19 December 2016, and by July 2020, 200 jets had been delivered. It has been the world's best-selling business jet every year since 2018.

Powered by a Williams FJ33 turbofan, the all-carbon fiber, low-wing, seven-seat Vision SF50 is pressurized, cruises at 300 knots (560 km/h; 350 mph) and has a range of over 1,200 nautical miles (2,200 km; 1,400 mi). For emergency uses, it has both a whole-airframe ballistic parachute and autoland system.

Reviews have compared its performance to high-performance single-turboprop aircraft. In 2018, the Vision Jet was awarded the Collier Trophy for the "greatest achievement in aeronautics or astronautics in America" during the preceding year, being the first certified single-engine civilian jet.

== Development ==
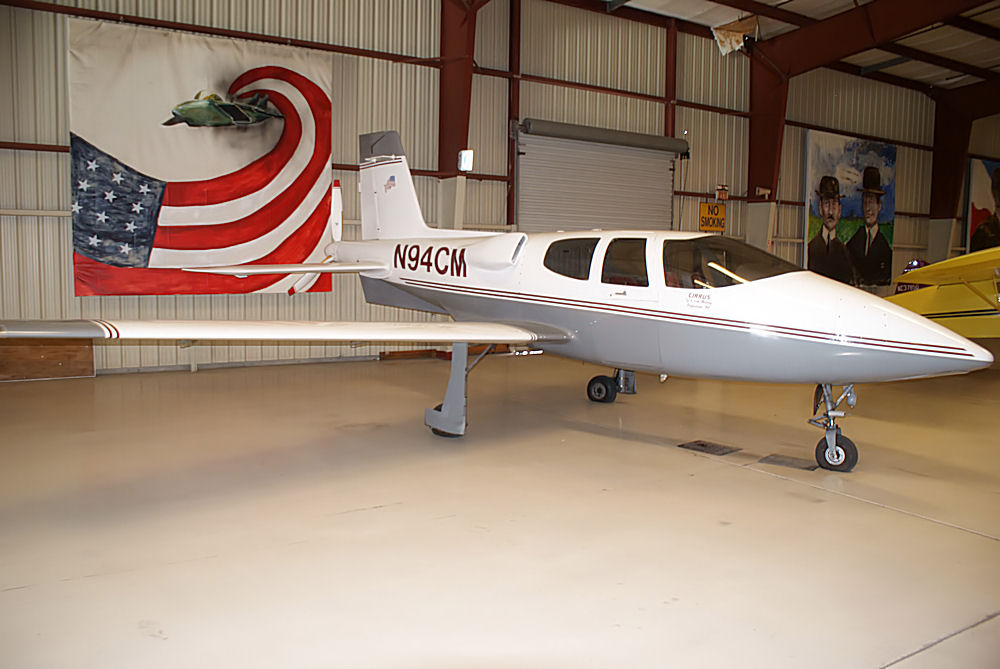
The Vision SF50 was inspired by Cirrus' first model, the 1988 pusher prop homebuilt VK-30 (pictured), from which a turboprop prototype was developed, the ST-50.

=== Naming ===
From June 2006 to July 2008, the design was developed under the project name "The Jet", or "The-Jet by Cirrus". On 9 July 2008, Cirrus announced the marketing name of "Vision SJ50", with "V" for the V-tail and "SJ" for "single-jet". By March 2009, the aircraft was re-designated "Vision SF50", as it uses a single-fanjet engine. By April 2016, Cirrus was calling it the "Vision Jet" and on 28 October 2016, it was certified by the FAA under the name "Model SF50".

=== Early development ===
The company began initial development on the jet in 2003, led by Cirrus founders the Klapmeier brothers and their vice president of advanced development Mike Van Staagen, at an offsite Duluth, Minnesota location they called the "Moose Works”, a parody on Lockheed Martin's Advanced Development Programs dubbed the "Skunk Works".

The jet was announced by Cirrus in June 2006 at the Cirrus Owners and Pilots Association meeting. At the October 2006 NBAA Convention, Cirrus detailed its single jet program to solicit US$100,000 deposits from potential customers, targeting a price below $1 million and a 2010 certification, for a 300 kn (560 km/h) cruise speed around 25,000 ft (7,600 m) with a Williams FJ33 and a whole-airplane parachute recovery system. Cirrus described it as the "slowest, lowest, and cheapest jet available."

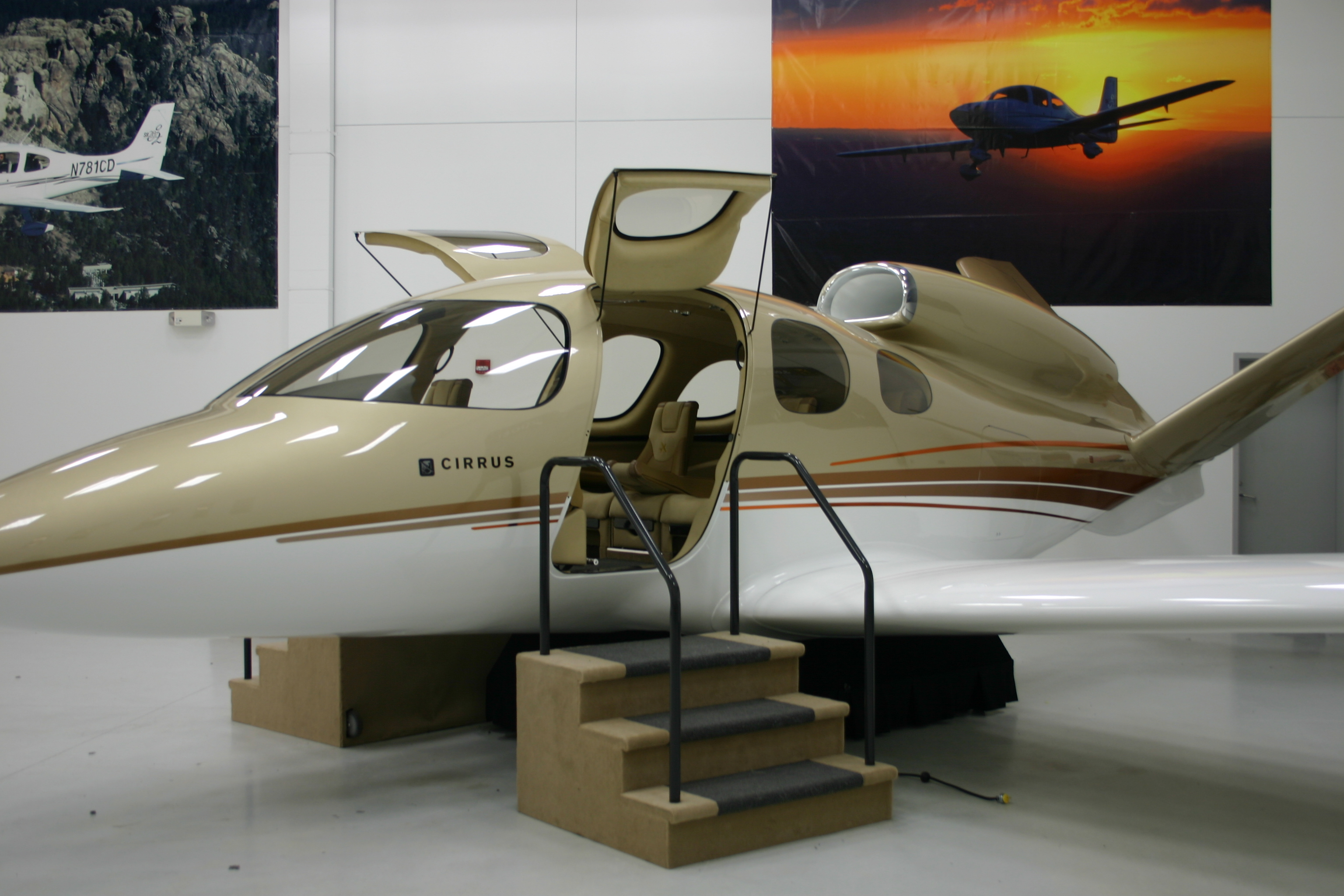
Original Vision Jet mock-up in July 2007

In early 2007 the company gave deposit holders a drawing of the aircraft in the form of a jigsaw puzzle, one piece at a time. On 27 June 2007, the puzzle was completed and the aircraft mock-up was unveiled the following day. Starting at this time it became described as a "personal jet".

In September the L-3 SmartDeck avionics package was selected for the jet development. On 27 December, Cirrus Design leased a 189,000 sq ft (17,600 m^{2}) former Northwest Airlines hangar at Duluth International Airport in which to build the design.

By 22 May 2008, the company had 400 refundable deposits of US$100,000. The prototype was first shown publicly at the annual Cirrus Owners and Pilots Association Cirrus Migration on 26 June 2008.

=== Initial flight tests ===
The Vision Jet was first flown on 3 July 2008 at the Duluth airport. It was then flown at AirVenture Oshkosh later that month.

By 3 December, the prototype had flown 120 hours, exploring the whole center of gravity envelope, testing engine in-flight shut-down and restart and aerodynamic stall characteristics. The right side door was replaced by an emergency egress hatch to save weight on production aircraft. Based on test flights and computer models, the aerodynamic design was modified to increase performance and improve the engine thrust angle. The production aircraft was planned to have a more pointed nose, larger belly section, redesigned wing-root fairing, reduced tail sweep and a larger or dual ventral fin.

The aircraft's payload was planned to be 1,200 or 400 lb (540 or 180 kg) with full fuel, based on an expectation of owners often flying long trips solo. Range was targeted for 1,100 nmi (2,037 km) and maximum cruise speed for 300 kn (556 km/h). An FAA type certificate was to be applied for by mid-December 2008, with EASA certification delayed by uncertainty over positioning in the European market. It was decided by the company that pilot training would be required in the aircraft type certificate, like the Eclipse 500. However, this was not written into the final type certificate. The aircraft's base price was US$1 million in 2008 and its equipped price was anticipated to be US$1.25 million for 2011 deliveries.

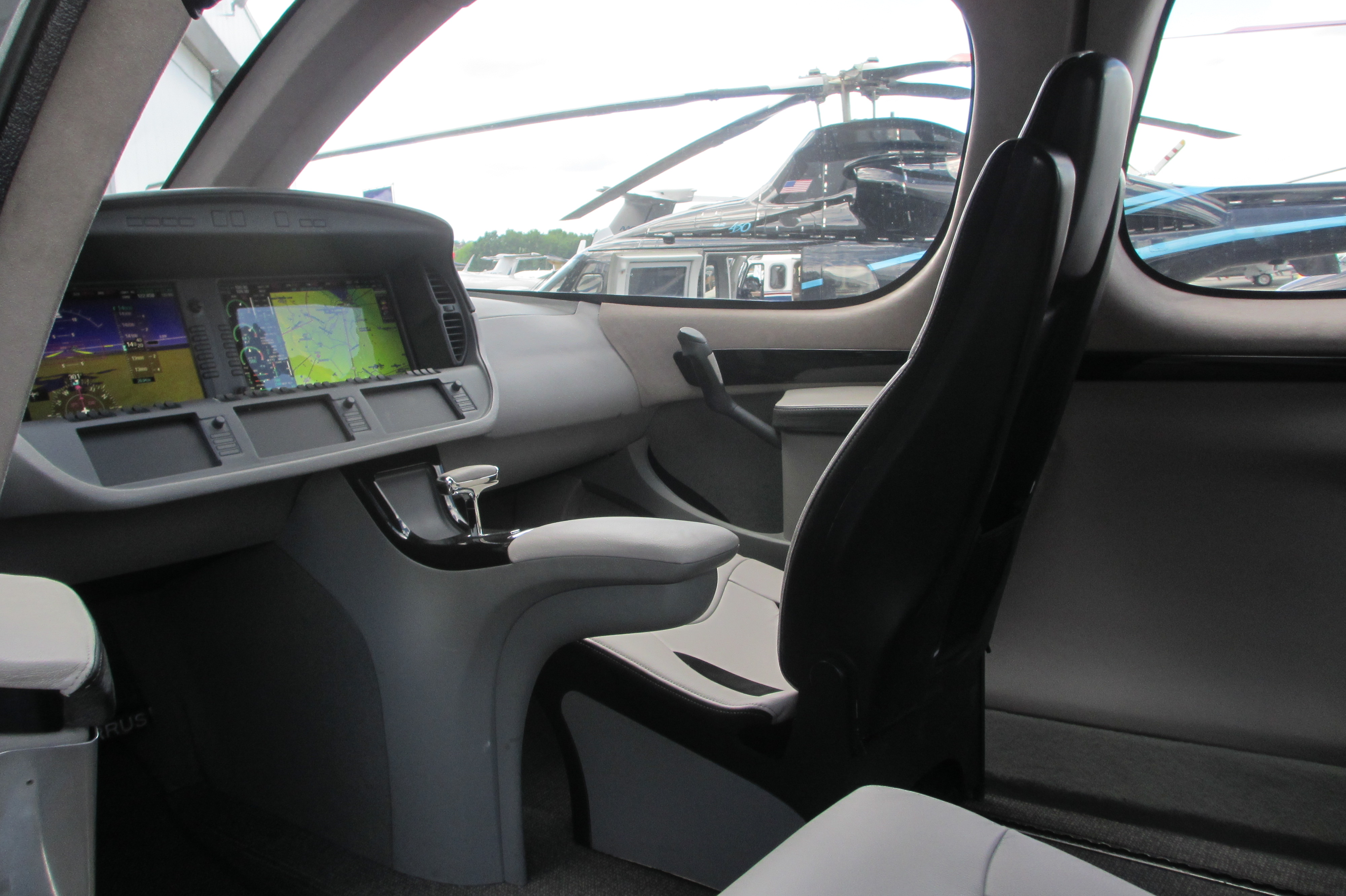
An early concept mock-up of the flightdeck

On 31 March 2009, Cirrus confirmed that the Garmin G1000 avionics had been selected for the SF50 production aircraft. In mid June 2009, L-3 Communications sued Cirrus for US$18M over the cancellation of its previously selected avionics.

=== Financing difficulties ===
In 2009, during the height of the Great Recession, progress on the program slowed significantly. By the end of June, Cirrus co-founder and former CEO Alan Klapmeier proposed buying the project from the company and its major shareholder Arcapita, to speed up development and produce it under a new company, which would be advised by Merrill Lynch.

On 26 July, Alan's brother and fellow Cirrus co-founder Dale Klapmeier came out in support of his efforts and said that Alan was the only person Cirrus would consider letting take over the jet program. Cirrus stated that financing the project was necessary to complete certification and commence production, either at the company or with Alan Klapmeier. However, on 31 July, Alan announced that the offer did not meet Arcapita's or Cirrus’ expectations. In August, he left the company while Dale remained, effectively ending the formal 25-year business partnership between the Klapmeier brothers.

By July 2009, 200 hours of flight tests had been completed and the resulting design changes had been incorporated, including an X-tail, simpler and lighter flaps, and handling changes to induce a pitch up when applying thrust. Although some deposits had been refunded during the economic recession, Cirrus still had nearly 400 orders and anticipated first deliveries in 2012, subject to capital funding. On 2 September, Cirrus announced its price: US$1.39M for deposit holders, equipped similar to a Cirrus SR22 GTS, US$1.55M with a US$100,000 deposit before the end of the year, and US$1.72M after that, with a US$50,000 deposit. In November 2009, following additional test flights, development slowed again due to the lack of capital, delaying deliveries past 2012. Cirrus’ leased space in the ex-Northwest hangar in Duluth closed around this time as well, caused by shrinking sales.

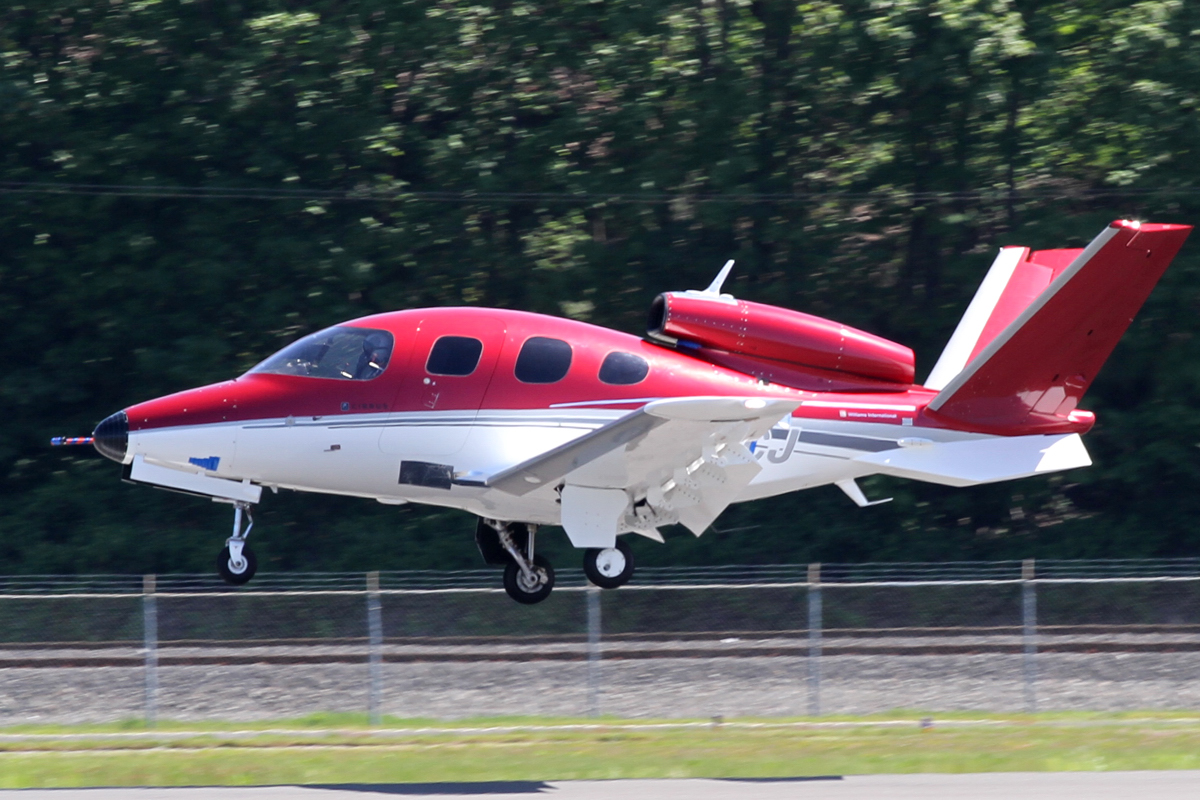
SF50 prototype landing in 2010

By January 2010, the prototype had accumulated 236 hours, while the certification and delivery timeline was reliant on cash flow, as 428 orders were backlogged and growing by one or two per week. By early June, the then-US$1.72M jet had 431 orders, with deposits becoming non-refundable at the beginning of that year. A conforming prototype was expected to be completed by the end of 2010 and fly by the end of 2011, targeting a mid-2013 certification date, while developing the "high-risk" full-aircraft parachute system.

=== CAIGA investment ===
In April 2012, Cirrus's new owner CAIGA invested enough in the project to secure its development, previously estimated at $150 million. By July 2012, the prototype had flown 600 hours in almost 600 flights and the company was ready to build the composite construction tooling required for a conforming prototype, expected to fly in late 2013 for type certification testing.

By February 2013 the company was hiring staff to produce the aircraft, now priced at US$1.96M. In April, the new prototype roll-out date was announced for 2013. Certification flight testing was scheduled to start in 2014. In October 2013, three test aircraft were under construction, the first deliveries were scheduled for 2015 and the order book now held 500 deposits. By then the first conforming aircraft was to fly in early 2014.

=== Final flight tests ===
By February 2014, 800 hours of test flying had been completed. On 24 March 2014, the first conforming prototype flew. The prototype was displayed at the Oshkosh Airshow that summer. Pre-orders of the $1.96 million jet then numbered 550 and Cirrus intended to produce up to 125 aircraft per year. The second conforming test aircraft flew in November 2014. The third and final conforming test aircraft made its first flight on 20 December 2014.

In February 2015 the city of Duluth, Minnesota committed US$6M and had asked the state of Minnesota to contribute US$4M to build a US$10M factory that would be leased to Cirrus to produce the jet, to avoid the company moving the manufacturing operation elsewhere. In April 2015, confident the certification would be on schedule and no modifications needed, Cirrus started production of the first of its 550 orders for the design. In September, the Cirrus Perspective Touch glass cockpit by Garmin was finalized, featuring one primary flight display and one multi-function display, with three smaller touchscreen controllers located underneath.

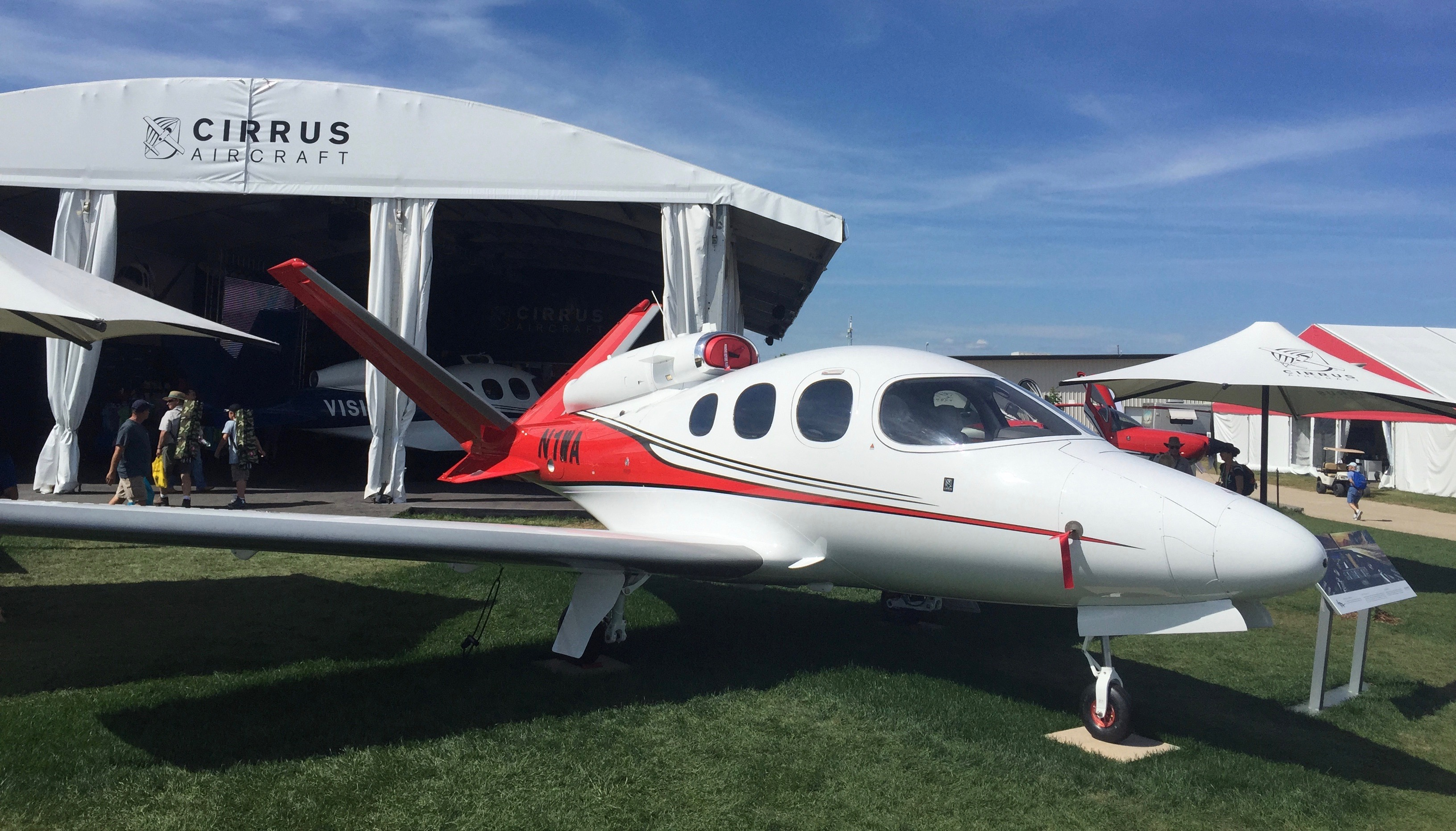
First production Vision SF50, displayed at the 2016 EAA AirVenture Oshkosh convention

By January 2016, certification had been delayed from 2015 to the first half of 2016 due to in-flight ballistic parachute testing. In March, it was announced that in-flight parachute deployment tests were not required by the Federal Aviation Administration for certification.

On 5 May 2016, the first production aircraft flew and certification was then forecast for June. The Williams FJ33-5A engine was approved by the FAA on 6 June 2016. Certification was then planned for the end of the same month. By July, the SF50 had over 600 orders, the four flight test aircraft had flown more than 1,700 hours and certification had been delayed to the fourth quarter of the year.

On 28 October, after a ten-year development process marked with myriad technical and financial challenges, the SF50 earned its type certificate from the FAA. The design became the first civilian, single-engine jet to be type certified.

=== Production ===
The first customer Vision SF50 was delivered on 19 December 2016, against 600 outstanding orders. The first customer delivery ceremony was held in the new $16 million, 70,000 sq ft (6,500 m^{2}) finishing center in Duluth, where Cirrus employs more than 750 people.

By April 2017, Cirrus planned to deliver 25 to 50 aircraft that year and 75 to 125 in 2018. A production certificate was awarded on 2 May, to produce more with no individual inspections. As 15% of its orders are intended for the European market, Cirrus received EASA certification at the May 2017 EBACE. A video of the Cirrus Airframe Parachute System (CAPS) being tested in-flight with a piloted SF50 prototype was published by Business Insider in May 2017. By July 2017, seven customer aircraft had been delivered and one per week were being produced.

On 19 December 2018, Dale Klapmeier announced that he would leave his position as CEO of the company in the first half of 2019. By the end of 2018, 88 aircraft had been delivered, including 63 that year, while 540 orders were backlogged. Cirrus increased production to over 80 aircraft in 2019 and plans to produce 100 in 2020. By October 2019, the US market represented 85% of deliveries, but that was predicted to drop to 75% in 2020, as the number of international deliveries continues to grow.

Since August 2020, Cirrus has offered an optional emergency autoland system by Garmin, which the company introduced in October 2019. It initiates at the push of a button and is built into the G3000 integrated avionics for the new G2 model. The system is the 3rd certified in general aviation (and 1st ever on a jet), along with the Piper M600 and Socata TBM 940. Cirrus calls the technology "Safe Return". Offered for $170,000 including extra equipment, it allows landing on runways over 5,836 ft (1,779 m).

By 4 April 2023, 439 Vision Jets were on the US Federal Aviation Administration registry.

As of December 2025, the Vision SF50 has been the most-delivered business jet every year since 2018.

== Design ==
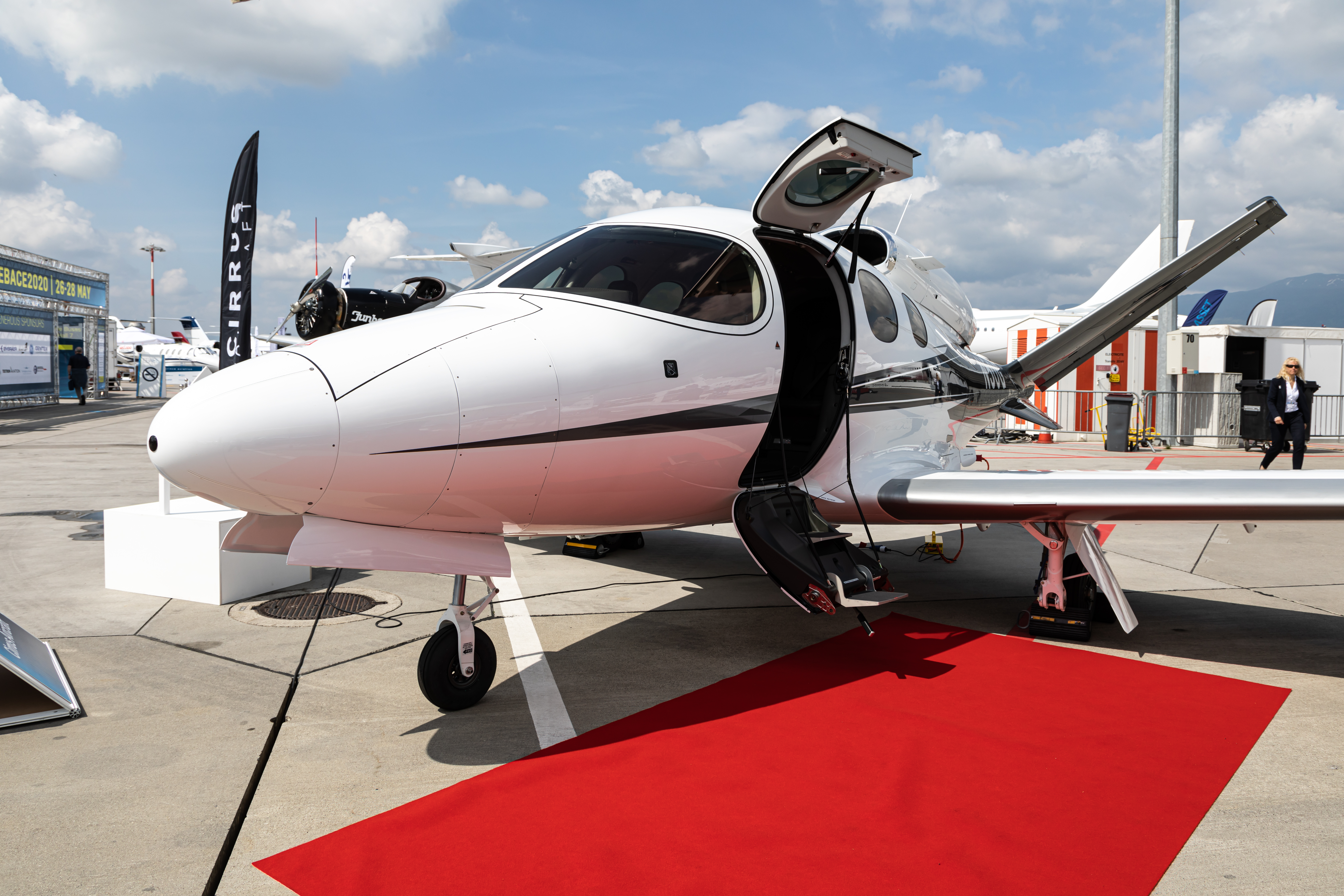
Cirrus Vision SF50 with cabin door open, at the 2019 European Business Aviation Convention

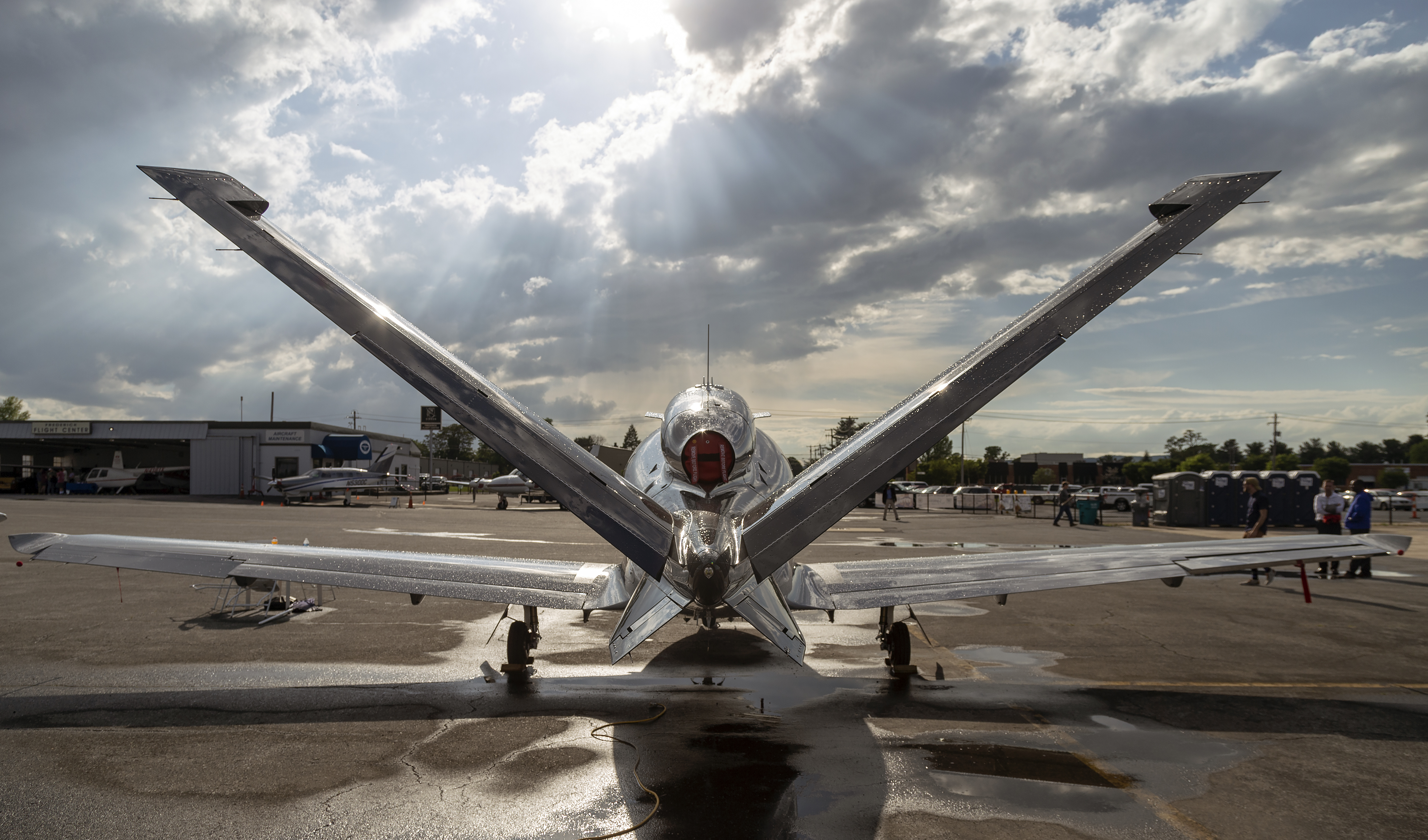
Rear view of the aircraft's V-tail and engine outlet

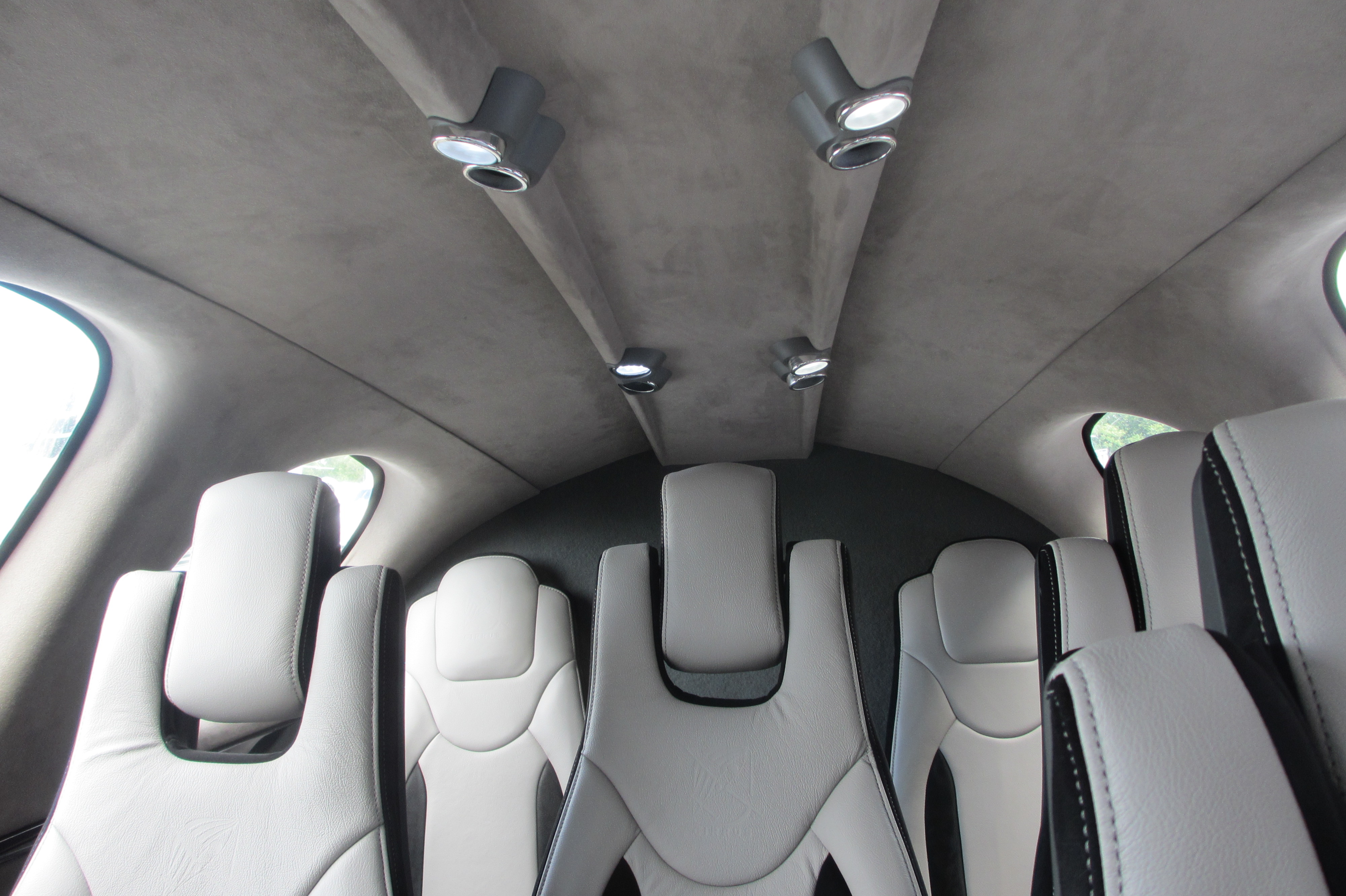
Interior showing cabin seating

The Vision SF50 is a low-wing cantilever monoplane powered by a single Williams FJ33-4A-19 turbofan, producing 1,900 lbf (8,500 N), mounted above the rear fuselage. It has a V-tail and retractable tricycle landing gear. The design is made entirely of composite material, a first for a production jet. The enclosed cabin is 5.1 ft (1.56 m) wide and 4.1 ft (1.24 m) high. It can seat up to seven occupants. The cockpit, second and third rows each seats two and an extra seat slides between the second and third row, but the third row is only large enough to accommodate children. It has a 300 kn (560 km/h) cruise speed.

Access to the cabin is through a clamshell door on the left hand side of the fuselage. The SF50 is designed for a life limit of 12,000 flight hours. This is not a type certification limit. The SF50 is the first jet to come with a whole-aircraft ballistic parachute, the company's CAPS, deploying from the aircraft's nose.

The SF50 is intended to be a step-up aircraft for pilots who have flown the Cirrus SR20, SR22 and other high-performance light aircraft, and was developed initially for personal use and not for the corporate or air taxi industries. However, by 2019, the jet was FAR part 135 approved for air taxi operators.

Early versions were certified for 28,000 ft (8,534 m) and later ones to 31,000 ft (9,449 m). The design has urethane deicing boots and an optional lavatory, a single-piece carbon shell will contain cabin pressurization and it should fit in a usual US 40 ft (12 m) Tee hangar.

The wing spar is made of pure pre-preg carbon fiber plies, cured in a high-pressure, high-temperature autoclave, while most of the other major airframe parts are made of low-pressure, low-temperature cured carbon fiber sandwich construction, around a honeycomb core, including hand layup of outer pre-preg carbon fiber plies. High-strength metal alloys are used for the landing gear and other concentrated stress areas, while the primary flight control surfaces and wing flaps are aluminum, with mechanical flight controls. The stall speed at MTOW with landing gear and flaps down is 67 kn (124 km/h) IAS, while the Vso is 64 kn (119 km/h) IAS at the 5,550 lb (2,520 kg) max landing weight, with Vref at 83 kn (154 km/h) IAS or lower, similar to an SR22. The aircraft has a 14.7:1 glide ratio, allowing it to glide 75 nmi (139 km) from its FL 310 ceiling to sea level.

In August 2020, the Vision SF50 received FAA approval for the installation of its Safe Return autoland system by Garmin, the first jet aircraft to do so. The system is activated with a cabin-ceiling switch and will determine the nearest safe airport, navigate to it, complete a landing and stop, all without human input.

=== Reviews ===
AVweb describes the Vision Jet as both a great airplane and a significant one by how well "the design resonates with the intended buyer". At FL270 and ISA +15 °C it cruises at 270 kn (311 mph; 500 km/h) and consumes 57 US gal/h (216 L/h). At the same FL270, ISA +15 °C, a review in Flightglobal reported a fuel consumption of 59 US gal/h (223 L/h) at Mach 0.46, 287 kn (330 mph; 532 km/h) and 45 US gal/h (170 L/h) at Mach 0.38 and a 235 kn (270 mph; 435 km/h) long-range cruise speed.

Aviation Week & Space Technology notes Cirrus has succeeded in producing the “lowest, slowest and least expensive” jet and noted that high-lift airfoils emphasize low-speed performance over top-end speed with a turboprop-like V_{MO} of 250 kn (288 mph; 463 km/h) IAS or a 0.53 M_{MO} and a FL280 ceiling. This review reported a 68 US gal (257 L)/h - 456 lb (207 kg)/h fuel burn at its 307 kn (353 mph; 569 km/h) TAS maximum cruise speed (at 5,575 lb (2,529 kg), FL280, ISA+6 °C) and 49 US gal (185 L)/h fuel burn at 270 kn (311 mph; 500 km/h). Like an early 1970s Citation 500, aerodynamic drag limits it to V_{MO} in a 300–500 ft/min (1.5–2.5 m/s) descents, for which it is held at max continuous thrust, unlike most current jets. The publication also states that the large wraparound windshields and sloping nose provide excellent forward visibility and a spacious cabin, although the engine noise is quite prominent, requiring active noise-cancelling headphones for all occupants. Approach speeds are reported to be comparable to the single-engine turboprops, but cruise and range are below some of them. The FJ33's FADEC lessens pilot workload, but changing thrust produces considerable pitch coupling, due to the engine's location.

Aviation International News reported a 60 US gal (227 L)/h fuel burn at 293 kn (337 mph; 543 km/h) TAS (FL280, ISA +12 °C). The author reported that it can carry two people and baggage over 1,000 or 1,200 nmi (1,200 or 1,400 mi; 1,900 or 2,200 km) at 300 or 240 kn (350 or 280 mph; 560 or 440 km/h) TAS (NBAA IFR range). Upgrading from a single-engine piston aircraft meant either a piston twin, like the Beechcraft Baron or Piper Seneca; a Piper Meridian, SOCATA TBM or Pilatus PC-12 high-performance single-engine turboprops; or a very light jet. The $2.3 million typically-equipped SF50 benefits from its operating simplicity and roomy cabin compared to the $2.25 million Piper M500/M600, the fast TBMs and the Epic E1000, or the nearly $5 million, larger capacity aircraft, such as the Pilatus PC-12 or Cessna Denali.

=== Awards ===
In April 2018, the design was named the 2017 winner of the Robert J. Collier Trophy for the "greatest achievement in aeronautics or astronautics in America" in the past year. The trophy was awarded for "designing, certifying, and entering-into-service the Vision Jet — the world's first single-engine general aviation personal jet aircraft with a whole airframe parachute system". Other accolades received by the aircraft include: the Flying Editors' Choice Award 2017, de:Fliegermagazin Best Plane of the Year 2017, Plane & Pilot Plane of the Year 2017, Popular Science 100 Greatest Innovations of 2017, Flying's Innovation Award 2018, and the 2023 Edison Awards Gold prize in Air Mobility.

== Operational history ==
On April 16, 2019, Cirrus issued a mandatory Service Bulletin to replace the angle of attack (AOA) vane within five flight hours after three reported incidents where stall warnings and stick shakers were activated by automated systems in normal flight. After similar problems led to the Boeing 737 MAX groundings, the FAA felt that this was serious enough to issue an Airworthiness Directive grounding the entire SF50 fleet on April 18. Unlike the 737 MAX, the electronic stability control system in the Vision Jet could be overridden with pilot inputs, and all three reported incidents resulted in safe landings. On April 22, Cirrus was shipping new corrected AOA hardware sensors to operators for replacement. The screws securing the potentiometer shaft to the AoA vane shaft were not properly torqued, and by May 2019, the fleet of over 100 had been returned to service.

Cirrus again issued a mandatory service bulletin on 7 February 2020 and the FAA grounded all SF50 jets on 14 February, after a cabin fire occurred on the ramp of Santa Monica Airport on 27 December 2019. Cirrus determined that the fire's probable cause came from one of the plane's 12 audio amplifier circuit cards overheating. No injuries were reported and the issue had already been addressed with 97% of the fleet of over 170 at the time of the grounding.

== Variants ==
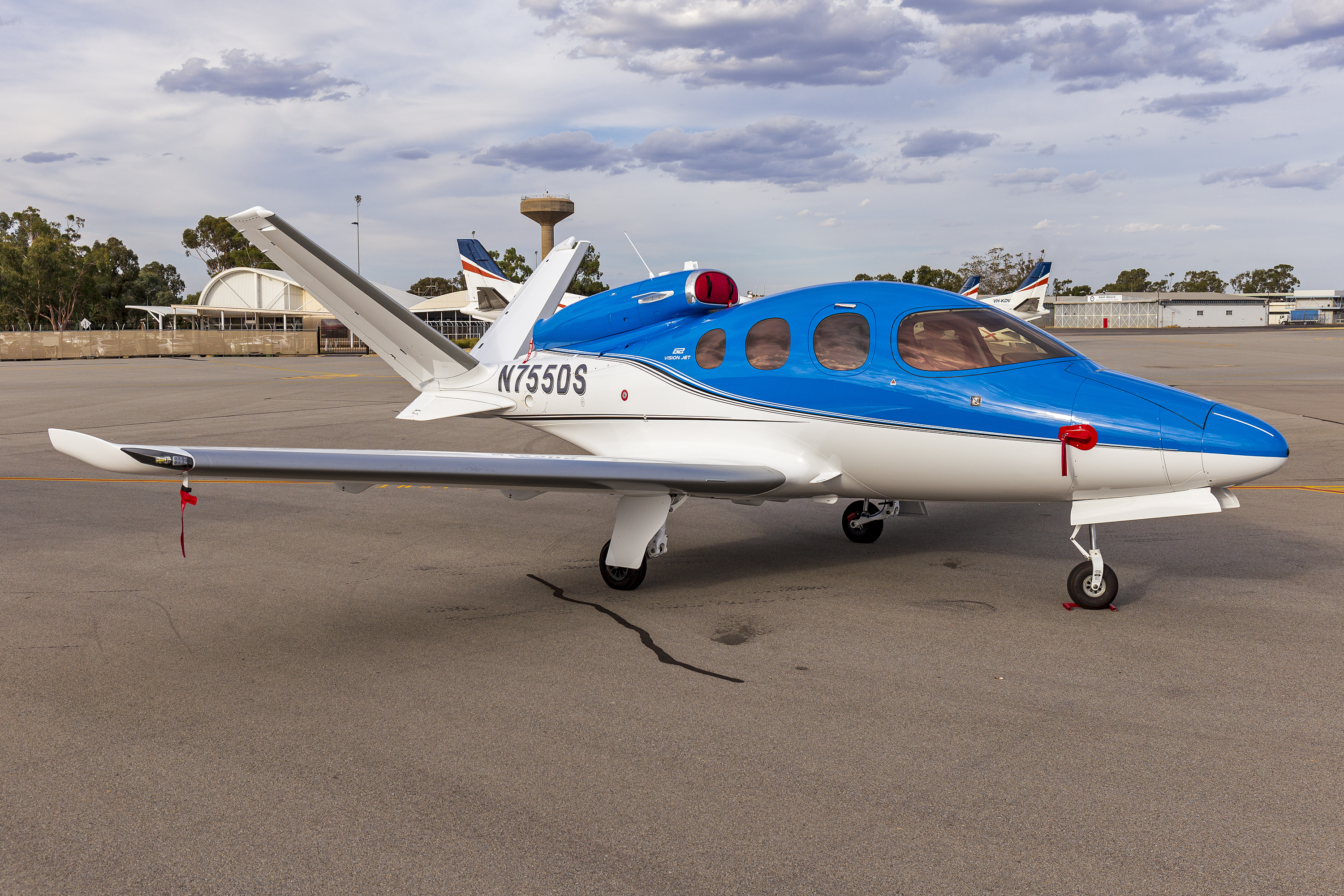
The 2019 G2 Vision Jet has a higher ceiling for improved speed and range, and updated avionics.

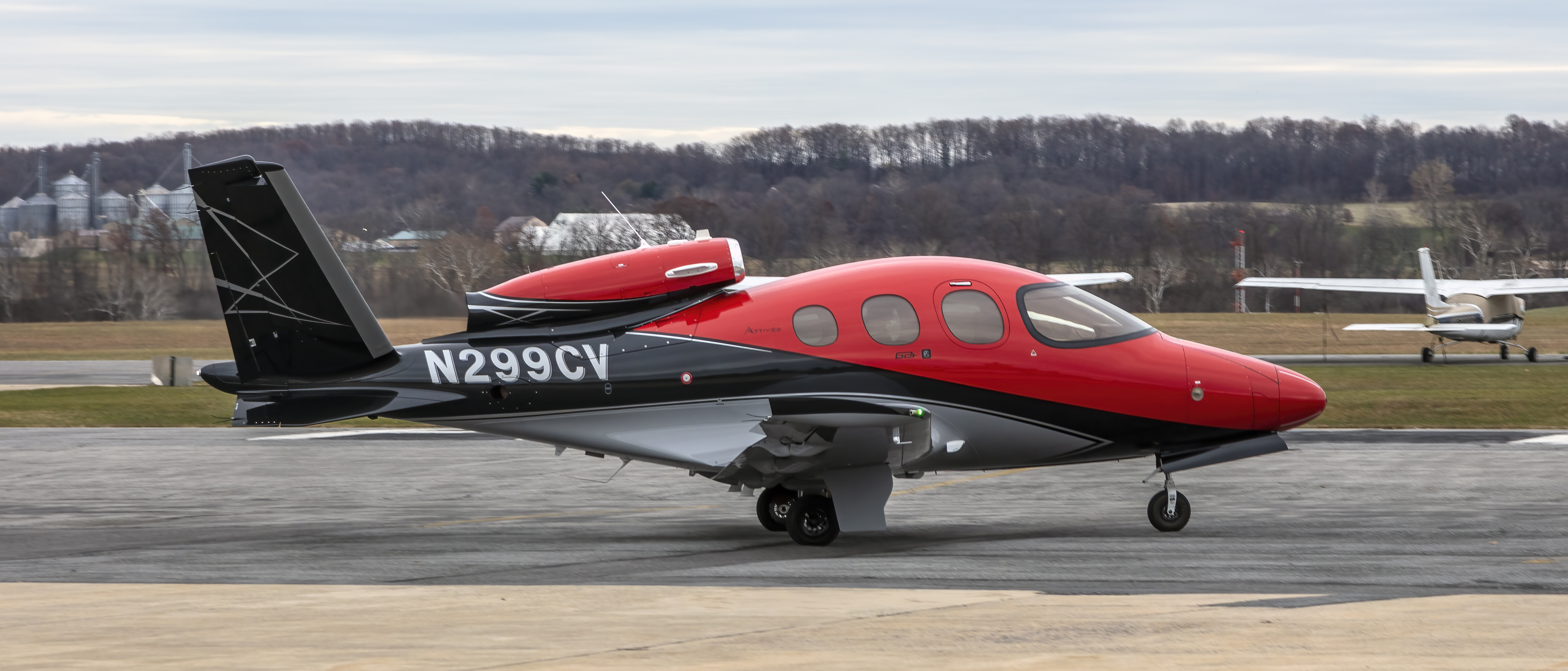
2021 G2+ Cirrus Vision Jet

G2 Vision Jet

On January 8, 2019, the improved G2 was announced, adding RVSM allowing a ceiling of 31,000 ft (9,400 m) and improving range to over 1,200 nmi (1,400 mi; 2,200 km), or allowing 150 lb (68 kg) more payload over 800 nmi (920 mi; 1,500 km). It is fitted with an autothrottle, an updated flight deck and upgrades to the aircraft cabin. The cruise speed is increased from 304 to 311 kn (350 to 358 mph; 563 to 576 km/h) and its base price is raised to $2.38 million, reaching $2.75 million with options.

The second generation production starts with serial number 94. Cabin pressurization is raised from 6.4 to 7.1 psi (0.44 to 0.49 bar) and improved insulation cuts cabin noise by 3 dB. At FL 310, ISA and 5,457 lb (2,475 kg), fuel flow is 60 US gal (230 L)/h at 309 kn (356 mph; 572 km/h) TAS.

G2+

On July 20, 2021, Cirrus announced the G2+ variant of the Vision Jet, with a 20-percent increase in takeoff performance and Gogo Inflight WiFi. The model also has a slightly longer range and increased payload. In 2023, its equipped price was $3.25M.

All current G2+ models and later G2 models include the Cirrus Safe Return emergency autoland system by Garmin.

G3 Vision Jet

On February 3rd, 2026, the company introduced the G3 Vision Jet with a redesigned cabin including seating for six adults and one child, ATC–pilot datalink communications, improved taxi guidance, automatic database updates through the Cirrus IQ Pro app, and alerts-linked electronic checklists that notify the pilot about relevant procedures when cautions or warnings occur.

The G3 also includes new "Cirrus Spectra" wingtips with brighter landing lights and a distinctive halo effect, which are design elements that were first introduced on the SR series in 2017.

== Operators ==
In July 2008, SATSair, an air taxi company that was 25% owned by Cirrus, ordered five Cirrus Vision SF50s, intending to add them to its fleet of Cirrus SR22 piston aircraft. SATSair subsequently ceased operations on 24 October 2009, prior to taking delivery of any SF50s. Florida-based charter company Verijet operated a fleet of ten G2 Vision Jets, at one point in 2021 having a total of 25 SF50s on order until ultimately filing for bankruptcy in 2025.

Other air taxi operators have expressed an interest in potentially using the Vision SF50 and some industry experts have suggested that the jet could help revive the air taxi industry.

== Accidents and incidents ==
As of November 2022, there had been two separate SF50 Cirrus Airframe Parachute System (CAPS) deployments, resulting in ground impacts and four survivors: one person with no injuries, two with minor injuries and a fourth person with serious though "non-life-threatening" injuries.

== Specifications (G2 model) ==
Data from Cirrus

General characteristics

- Crew: one
- Capacity: six passengers
- Length: 30 ft 11 in (9.42 m)
- Wingspan: 38 ft 9 in (11.8 m)
- Height: 10 ft 11 in (3.32 m)
- Empty weight: 3,550 lb (1,610 kg)
- Gross weight: 6,000 lb (2,722 kg)
- Fuel capacity: 2,000 pounds (910 kg)
- Cabin width × height: 5.1×4.1 ft (1.56×1.24 m)
- Max payload: 1,328 lb (602 kg)
- Powerplant: 1 × Williams FJ33-5A turbofan, 1,846 lbf (8.21 kN) thrust

Performance

- Maximum speed: 311 kn (358 mph, 576 km/h) maximum cruise speed
- Cruise speed: 300 kn (350 mph, 560 km/h) max cruise speed, 240 kn (280 mph; 440 km/h) economical cruise speed
- Stall speed: 67 kn (77 mph, 124 km/h) with flaps
- Range: 500 nmi (580 mi, 930 km) with 1,200 lb (544 kg) payload at max cruise to 1,200 nmi (2,222 km; 1,381 mi) with 200 lb (91 kg) payload at economical cruise
- Service ceiling: 31,000 ft (9,400 m)
- Mach maximum operating: Mach 0.53
- Fuel consumption: 69gal/h, 462 lb (210 kg)/h at maximum cruise, 315 lb (143 kg)/h at economical cruise
- Takeoff: 621 metres (2,036 ft) roll, 973 metres (3,192 ft) over 15 m (50 ft) obstacle
- Landing: 496 metres (1,628 ft) ground roll

Avionics

- Garmin G3000 based Cirrus Perspective Touch+

== See also ==
Related development

- Cirrus VK-30

Aircraft of comparable role, configuration, and era

- Diamond D-Jet
- Eclipse 400
- Epic Victory
- Piper PA-47 PiperJet
- Flaris LAR01

Related lists

- List of very light jets
