= Klapmeier brothers =

American entrepreneurs, founders of Cirrus Aircraft Corporation

The Klapmeier brothers
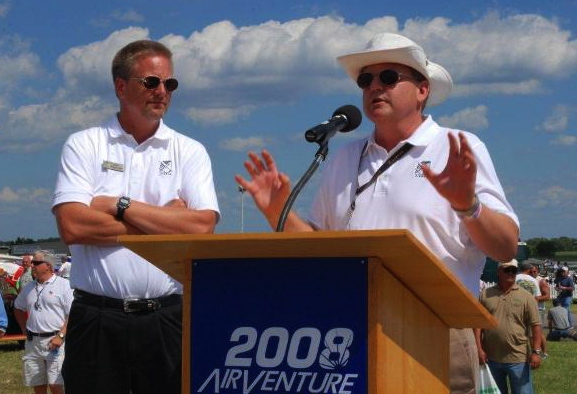
- Dale (left) and Alan Klapmeier speaking at the EAA AirVenture Oshkosh convention in 2008
- Other names: The dream brothers; The boys from Baraboo; The boys up in Duluth
- Education: DeKalb High School
- Occupations: Aviation entrepreneurs, aircraft designers
- Years active: 1979–2009 (as duo)
- Known for: Cirrus Aircraft founders, Cirrus SR20 and SR22, Cirrus Airframe Parachute System, Cirrus Vision SF50, pioneers of composite-airframes and glass cockpits for light aircraft
- Awards: See below
- Alan Klapmeier
- Born: October 6, 1958 (age 68); Saint Paul, Minnesota, US
- Alma mater: Wisconsin Ripon College (BA)
- Years active: 2010–2021 (as head of Kestrel)
- Spouse(s): Patti Graves (divorced); Sara Dougherty
- Children: 2
- Board member of: EAA, Bob Hoover Legacy Foundation (current); GAMA, Small Aircraft Manufacturers Association, AERObridge, AOPA's Air Safety Foundation, MVP.Aero, Build-A-Plane (former)
- Dale Klapmeier
- Born: July 2, 1961 (age 65); Rockford, Illinois, US
- Alma mater: University of Wisconsin–Stevens Point (BS)
- Years active: 2009–2019 (as head of Cirrus)
- Spouse(s): Patricia Meyer
- Children: 2
- Board member of: AOPA, Skyryse (current); EAA's Young Eagles Program, Red Tail Squadron, Scott D. Anderson Leadership Foundation, NASA's Aeronautics Research & Technology Roundtable, AKIA, AirSpace Minnesota (former)

The Klapmeier brothers, Alan Lee Klapmeier (born October 6, 1958) and Dale Edward Klapmeier (born July 2, 1961), are American retired aircraft designers and aviation entrepreneurs who together founded Cirrus Aircraft (as Cirrus Design Company) in 1984. Under the leadership of the Klapmeiers, Cirrus was the first aircraft manufacturer to install a whole-plane parachute recovery system as a standard on all its models—designed to lower the airplane and occupants safely to the ground in case of an emergency. The device is attributed with saving over 200 lives to date. From the brothers' use of all-composite airframe construction and glass panel cockpits on production aircraft, Cirrus is known for having revolutionized general aviation for modern light aircraft pilots.

Forbes magazine named Cirrus's highly popular single-engine SR-series (the SR20 and SR22, certified in 1998 and 2000 respectively) Best Private Airplane, saying "the Klapmeier brothers built the first genuinely new plane in the sky in many years", Time magazine regarded them as "giving lift to the small-plane industry with an easy-to-fly design", and Flying magazine ranked Alan and Dale at number 17 on its list of the 51 Heroes of Aviation; they are the two youngest and highest-ranked living people on the list. In 2014, the Klapmeier brothers were inducted into the National Aviation Hall of Fame.

The brothers started Cirrus in the basement of their parents' rural dairy barn near Baraboo, Wisconsin. Their first design, the VK-30 homebuilt aircraft, was introduced in 1987, although sales of the kit fluctuated and deliveries ultimately ended only a few years later. As the company grew they moved it in 1994 to Duluth, Minnesota, where from 2003 until his departure from Cirrus in 2009, Alan had heavy influence over the early design and development of the Vision Jet. Dale then continued the program, leading it to certification in 2016 and production in the ensuing years. The aircraft won the Collier Trophy in 2018 for representing the first jet of its kind to enter the market.

After Cirrus, Alan became CEO of Kestrel Aircraft in 2010, which merged with Eclipse Aerospace in 2015 to form One Aviation. The company ceased operations in 2021. Dale remains at Cirrus as a senior advisor and served as its CEO from 2011 to 2019.

== Background ==
=== Early life ===
Alan and Dale Klapmeier grew up in DeKalb, Illinois and attended DeKalb High School. Their parents bought a second home in the early 1970s on a small, rural farm near Baraboo, Wisconsin. Aviation was a part of the brothers' lives from a very early age. Alan told Airport Journals in 2006 that when he was a baby, the only way his mother could get him to stop crying at times was to bring him to an airport and park the car at the end of the runway so he could watch airplanes; a tradition she continued with Dale soon after his birth as well. The brothers frequently built model airplanes as young children and rode their bicycles to local airports. When Dale reached the age of 15, he learned to fly in a Cessna 140 before learning to drive a car. Alan joined the Civil Air Patrol at age 17 as a way of receiving more affordable flying lessons. In his youth he often spoke about how he and his younger brother would one day design and build aircraft that would compete with Cessna.

=== Family ===
Alan and Dale are two of three children born to Larry and Carol Klapmeier. They come from an entrepreneurial family. The eldest brother, Ernie Klapmeier, opened his own accessory store of military reenactment goods and regalia in Aurora, Illinois and managed the shop for many years since its founding in 1997; their uncle, Jim Klapmeier, and grandfather, Elmer Klapmeier, were both entrepreneurs in the boat-manufacturing industry and started as a two-person company building pontoon-like houseboats on Rainy Lake, Minnesota throughout the 1950s and early 1960s. Elmer ran a second business flying a "puddle jumper" plane around Wisconsin delivering parts to dairy farmers, while Jim later moved the boat project to a facility in Mora, Minnesota where he grew and retained it for several decades, transitioning into the market of fiberglass motor yachts.

Larry and Carol were also entrepreneurs who founded a successful nursing home near Chicago, at which the three brothers worked as kids doing janitorial chores during the 1960s and 1970s.

=== Education ===
Alan graduated in 1980 from Wisconsin's Ripon College with degrees in physics and economics. While a senior there in 1979, he began developing sketches of an airplane that would become the Cirrus VK-30, and worked for more than three years in the Ripon admissions office while Dale finished college. The two began making foam models of the VK-30 in 1980, and in 1983, Dale graduated from the University of Wisconsin–Stevens Point with degrees in business administration and economics. He once said that his fall-back plan was to become a banker had their early career in aviation never succeeded.

== Career ==
=== Early work ===
In 1979, Dale discovered a wrecked 1960 Aeronca Champ flipped over and abandoned at an airport in northern Wisconsin. The brothers then bought the plane from its owner with the very little money they had and rebuilt it in the shed at their family farmhouse. This was their first experience working on an aircraft as a self-taught restoration project, followed by the making of a Glasair I they saw introduced by homebuilt aircraft engineer and entrepreneur Tom Hamilton at the 1980 EAA Convention and Fly-In (now called AirVenture) in Oshkosh, Wisconsin. David Gustafson of Aircraft Spruce noted in 2012 that the only way the Klapmeier brothers' parents would lend them the money to buy a Glasair was if they wrote up a business plan explaining why constructing a homebuilt would further their professional lives.

=== Cirrus Aircraft ===
==== 1980s: VK-30, barn, inspiration for parachute, municipal airport ====
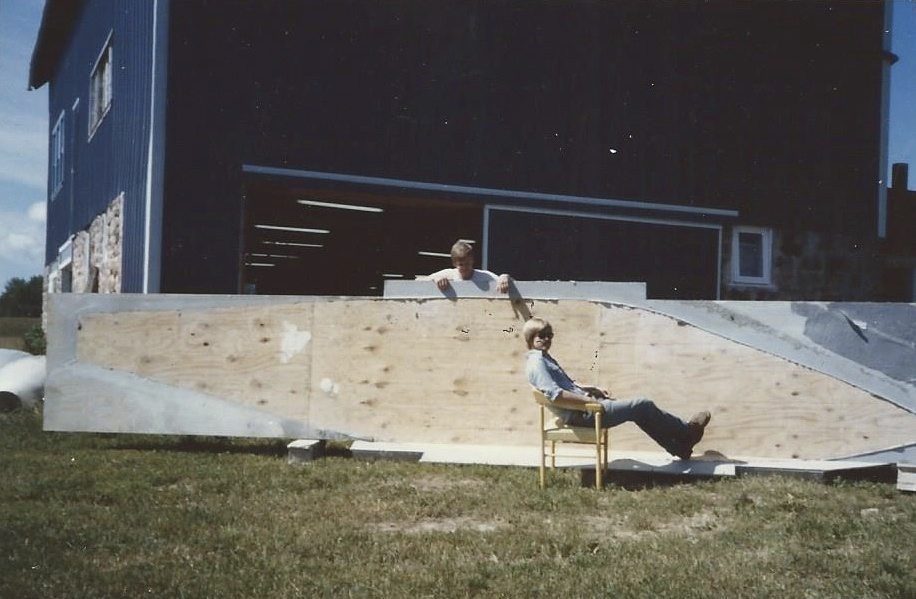
Klapmeier brothers in 1984 outside their parents' dairy barn near Baraboo, Wisconsin (Alan sitting in chair as Dale holds up a cutout of the first Cirrus VK-30)

Soon after Dale graduated from college the brothers formed an aircraft company in January 1984, which they named "Cirrus Design" (now known as Cirrus Aircraft) in remembrance of a summer drive they had a few years prior when they saw cirrus clouds on the horizon and wished that they were flying. Once they started the company, the Klapmeiers called upon Alan's former college roommate, Jeff Viken, to help out with their new design: the VK-30 (VK standing for Viken-Klapmeier). Viken was an aeronautical engineer who eventually married another aeronautical engineer, Sally Viken, and the unpaid Cirrus staff grew to four volunteers (with occasional help from the Klapmeiers' high school friend, Scott Ellenberger). The Cirrus VK-30 was a single-engine five-seat composite pusher with conventional wings and tail. Alan and Dale moved into the family farmhouse to be closer to the project and began work on the airplane in the basement of the barn "down where the cows were". They all pitched in with the designing and balanced that with hands-on labor. Jeff designed the airfoil while Sally designed the flap system. The four of them would finish designing a part or a system, build it, and return to designing. Experimental aircraft innovator Molt Taylor gave the Klapmeiers and Vikens technical advice surrounding the VK-30.

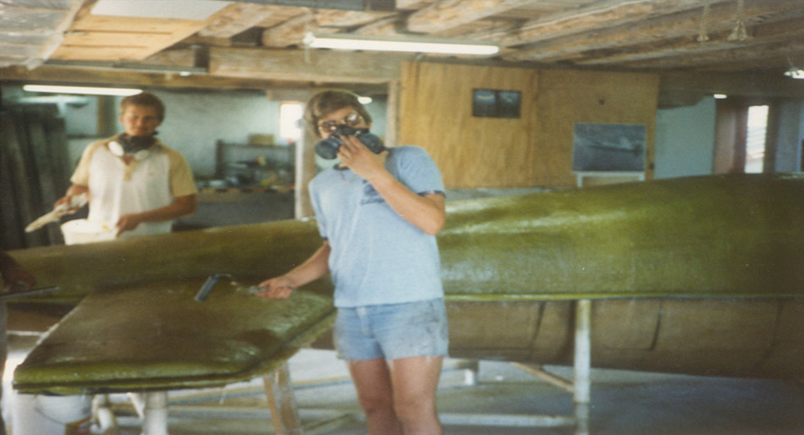
Dale (left) and Alan spreading resin over the VK-30's fiberglass mold in the basement of their barn, about 1985

The Klapmeier brothers would often fly their Champ from the farm up to their uncle's boat-building business in Mora to borrow tools and other supplies—such as polyester resin—for building the plane and molding its fuselage. To reduce cost, they went to different junk yards around southern Wisconsin and bought what they needed: a control system out of a wrecked Piper aircraft, a Cherokee nose landing gear to weld parts onto it and convert it to a retractable gear, and an O-540 (290 hp) engine they got off a scrapped de Havilland Heron. The first VK-30 slowly took shape.

In 1985, near the Sauk–Prairie Airport shortly after takeoff, Alan was involved in a fatal mid-air collision where the airplane he was flying, a Cessna 182, lost a large portion of its wing including half the aileron. The other plane, a Piper PA-15, spun into the ground killing the pilot, but Alan was able to maneuver a landing back on the runway by keeping high airspeed and using full aileron deflection. From surviving this incident, Alan sought to make flying safer—ultimately leading to the brothers' pursuit of implementing a parachute on all their designs starting in the mid-1990s.

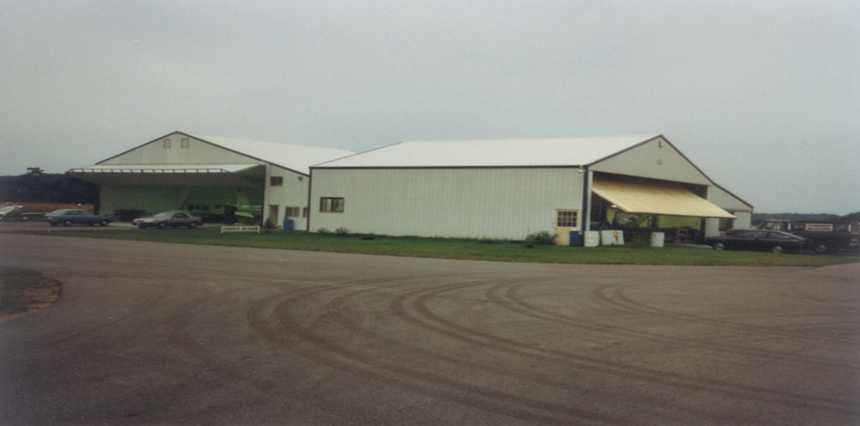
Original Cirrus Design headquarters on the Baraboo–Dells Airport

In 1986, the Klapmeiers hired their first paid-employee, an experienced welder and aluminum component designer by the name of Dennis Schlieckau. They then borrowed money from friends and family in order to build a hangar on the Baraboo–Wisconsin Dells Airport, and moved the VK-30 project from the barn to their new Baraboo headquarters with now only three other employees assisting them (a few years later they would build a second hangar for the production of more prototypes).

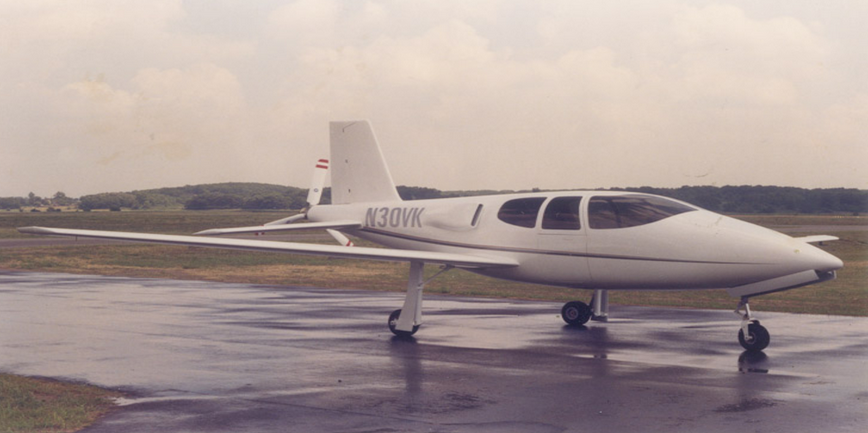
VK-30 kit on ramp in Baraboo

Their first display of the VK-30 was at the EAA AirVenture Oshkosh airshow in 1987. In 1988, the Cirrus team was gradually beginning to grow with nearly a dozen staff members. That year the Klapmeiers hired two of their most vital employees: Patrick Waddick, Cirrus's current president and chief operating officer (originally hired as an intern sweeping floors), and Paul Johnston, the company's chief engineer, also known as one of their most gifted designers. After conducting multiple stress-tests on the wing, the first VK-30 prototype was ready to fly. Both Alan and Dale wanted to make the first flight, but their mother would not let them. Jeff Viken knew a test pilot from NASA Langley named Jim Patton, who made the first test flight on February 11, 1988. They sold their first few kits at EAA AirVenture later that same year. Jeff and Sally Viken left the company shortly thereafter.

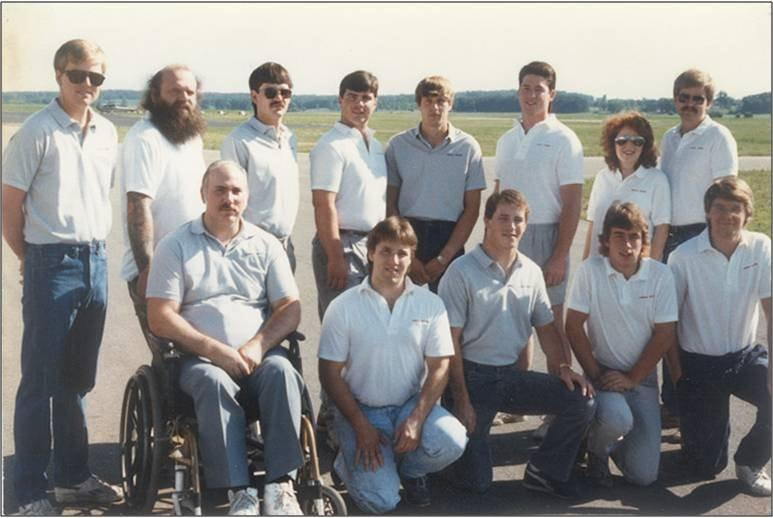
Cirrus team circa 1989–1990 (Dale top far left, Alan top far right)

At the end of the 1980s, the Klapmeier brothers approached inventor Sam Williams of Williams International about the possibility of installing a small, single fan-jet engine on the VK-30. The idea never materialized at the time, however, it would significantly inspire the design of the original Vision Jet concepts from the early-to-mid 2000s.

==== 1990s: ST50, factory, SR20, company innovation and flight-testing ====
In the early 1990s, sales of the VK-30 were dwindling down; it became a market failure. By the time they discontinued production in the middle of the decade they had sold and shipped out 40 kits, of which only 13 were finished and flown. Towards the end of 1991, the brothers began to question their goals and started thinking about their lifelong dream of getting into the world of certified aircraft. Alan began making sketches for the ST-50, a five-seat single-engine turboprop. Dale wanted something simpler and began fiddling with a concept that was to evolve into the SR20.

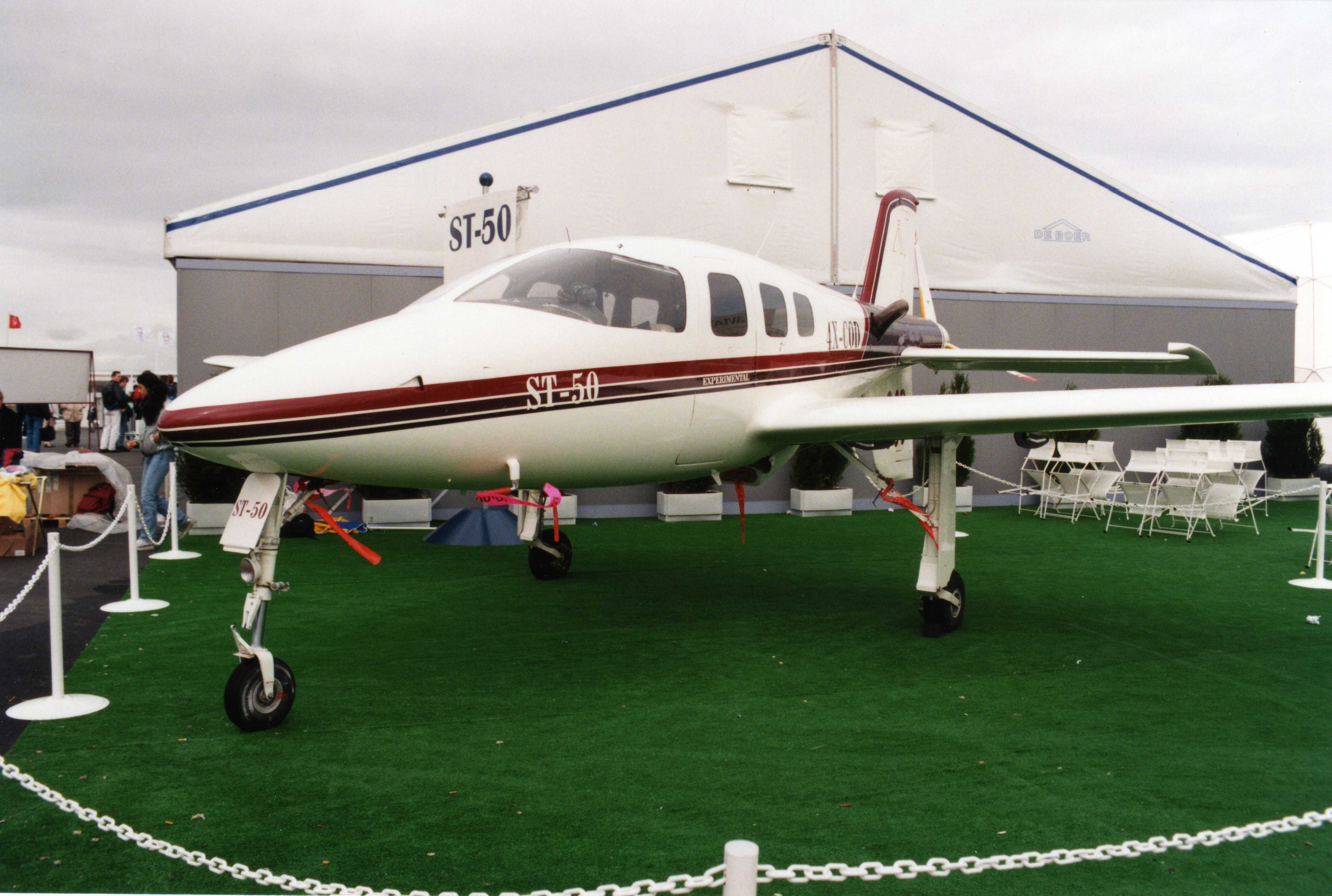
Cirrus-Israviation ST50 at the Paris Air Show in 1997

Cirrus started developing the ST-50 in the mid 1990s under contract to Israeli aircraft manufacturer IsrAviation. The aircraft was configured like the VK-30 but was powered by a Pratt & Whitney Canada PT6-135 engine, in place of the piston engine used in the VK-30. The ST-50 prototype was first flown on December 7, 1994. During the beginning of that year, Alan and Dale moved the company from their headquarters in Baraboo to a 30,000-square-foot research and development facility in Duluth, Minnesota, bringing 35 employees with them and hiring another 15 at once. They began work on the Cirrus SR20, a four-passenger, single-engine, piston-powered composite aircraft. Cirrus then released its new marketing campaign: "Hangar X", displaying a secret facility with nothing but a dim light and slightly cracked door. Inside was the "mysterious to-be-certified aircraft", but its unveiling would not come for a few more months, during the summer of 1994. The Klapmeier brothers and their team took much inspiration from the automotive industry while designing the airplane's interior.

Starting at this time, the brothers held the roles of Alan traveling around the country looking for investors and raising the capital Cirrus needed to certify the SR20 (known as "Mr. Outside"), and Dale staying back at the factory overseeing operations by keeping the design, testing and production moving (known as "Mr. Inside").

The first SR20 prototype made its maiden flight on March 21, 1995. The following year, the company broke ground on a 67,500-square-foot manufacturing facility in Grand Forks, North Dakota. In 1997, Cirrus started assembly of its first production prototype and added another 80,000-square-feet onto their Duluth facility for manufacturing purposes.

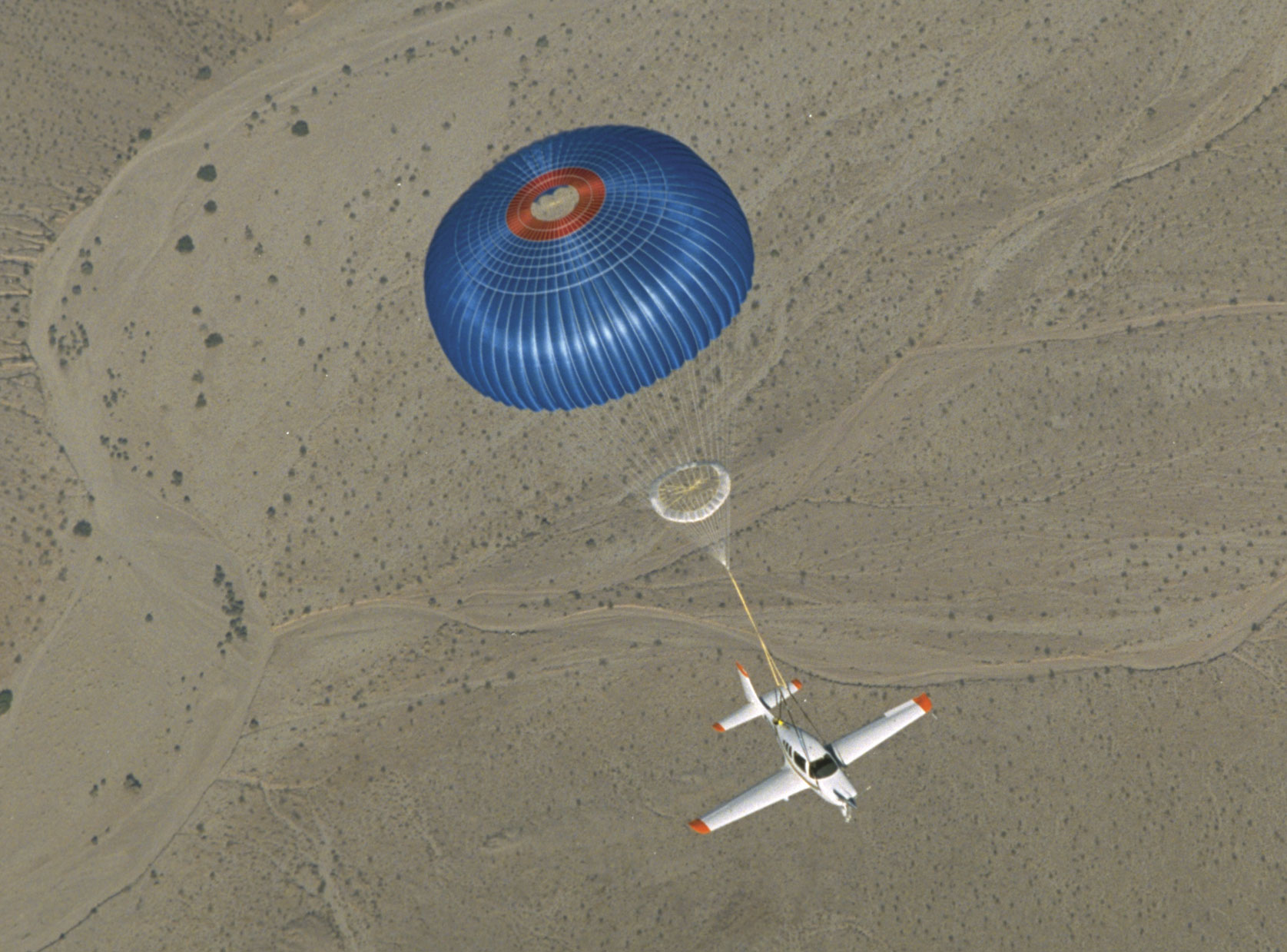
Cirrus SR20 test deployment of CAPS in 1998, Scott Anderson piloting

Through the Klapmeiers' vision, the SR20 became the first of many production advancements within light general aviation aircraft, including glass computer-monitored flight-displays instead of round analog dials (which would boast flat-panel avionic utilities such as satellite weather, traffic awareness and GPS steering), side-yoke flight controls instead of traditional yoke or stick consoles, all-composite construction instead of aluminum, and, most popularly known, the Cirrus Airframe Parachute System (CAPS). The Cirrus team spent several weeks during the summer of 1997 in the high desert of southern California testing the parachute. They would drop barrels of sand out a C-123 Cargo plane and flip a switch that would deploy the chutes when the barrels reached nearly 200 mph. The parachutes failed to deploy on multiple drop-tests before properly functioning. By the summer of 1998, they were ready to try the tests with an actual SR20. Chief test pilot Scott D. Anderson, a Stanford graduate, military F-16 pilot and "Renaissance man" who was known as a beloved and charismatic figure in Duluth, successfully made the first deployment of CAPS, and would go on to make all eight of the inflight test-deployments for development and certification of the SR20. The airplane became FAA approved and type certified in October 1998.

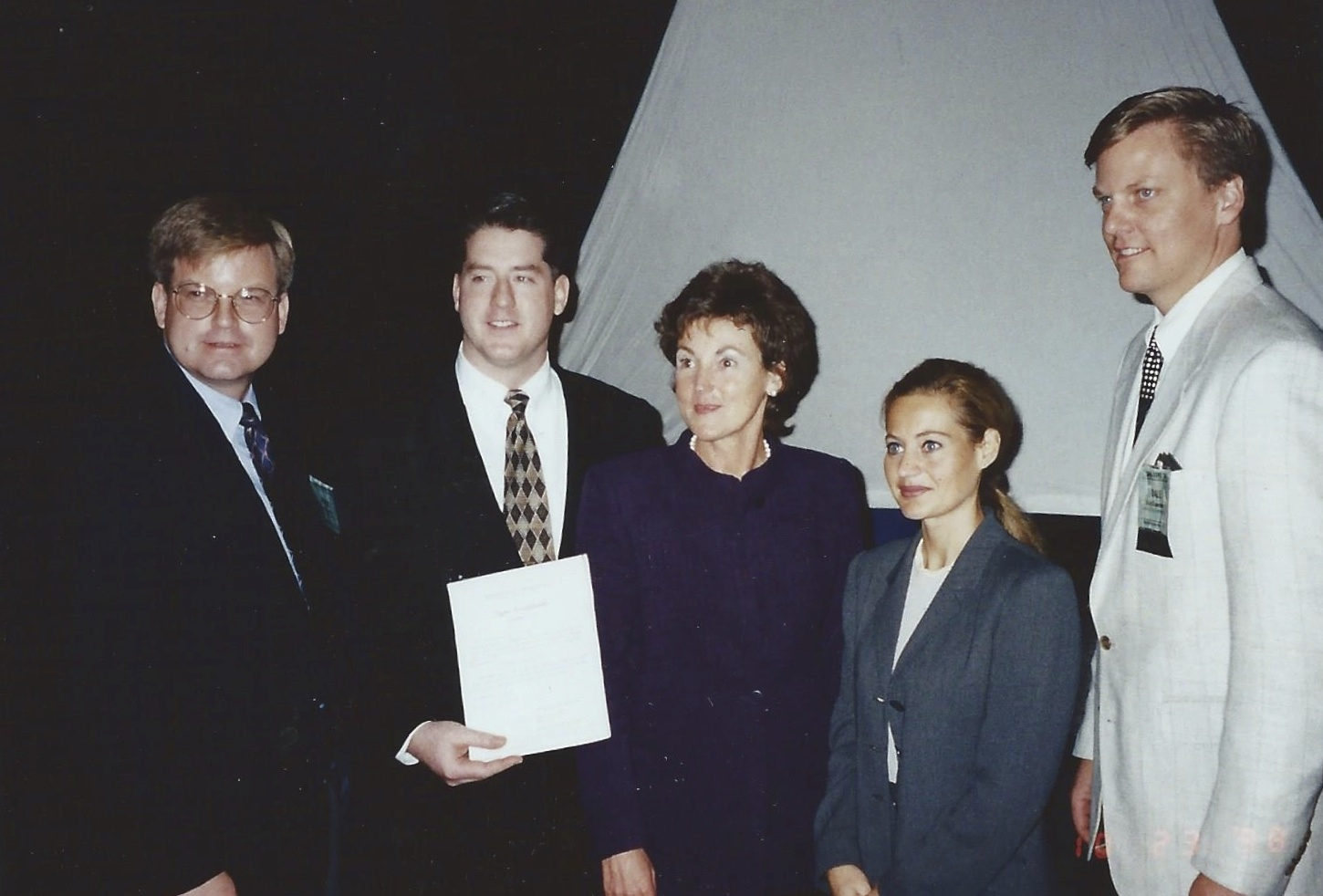
Receiving type certificate for the SR20 in 1998 (left to right: Alan, Cirrus president Patrick Waddick, FAA administrator Jane Garvey, and Dale far right)

On March 23, 1999, tragedy struck Cirrus when Scott Anderson was killed in a crash near the Duluth International Airport as he put the first production SR20 through torture-test maneuvers before it went on sale. The plane Anderson was flying had an aileron jam and was not yet equipped with the standard ballistic parachute that would come certified on every aircraft. Dale spoke at his posthumous induction into the Minnesota Aviation Hall of Fame on April 24, 2010, saying, "Scott was an exemplary pilot and person ... To date, 17 CAPS deployments have saved 35 lives due to Scott's pioneering work." Despite the tragedy, and the Klapmeier brothers losing a close friend and their most talented test pilot, Cirrus fixed the problem that killed Anderson and continued on to deliver the first SR20 in July 1999—receiving 400 orders by the first year alone.

==== 2000s: SR22, success and company growth, Vision Jet, recession ====
In the early 2000s, sales of the SR20 were steadily rising. This led to the Cirrus SR22, a faster, higher and more powerful version of the SR20. Production on the new aircraft started in 2001. In August of that year, Cirrus sold 58% of the company for $100 million to Crescent Capital, the US arm of the First Islamic Investment Bank of Bahrain (now called Arcapita), making the Klapmeier brothers both millionaires and minority stakeholders in their own company.

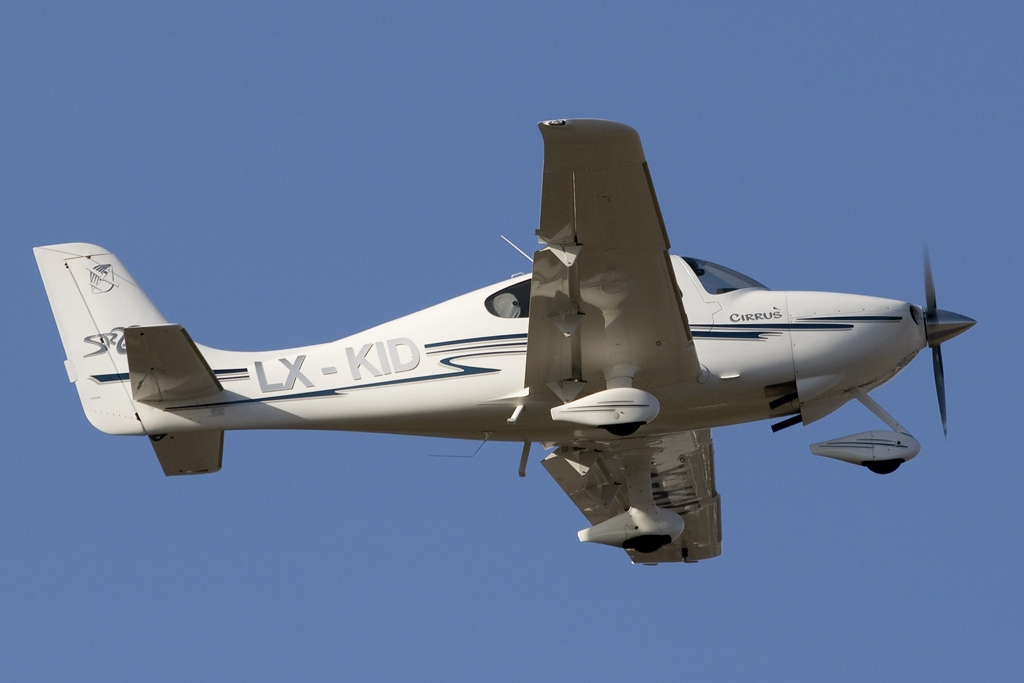
2003 piston-powered Cirrus SR22

By the middle of 2003, the SR22 had become the highest-selling general aviation aircraft in the world, beating out even that of Cessna Aircraft and achieving the brothers' childhood dream. Cirrus had more than 600 employees then; two years later that number would reach to over 1,000. The company was quickly expanding. Success for the Klapmeier brothers continued when they received the prestigious 2004 Ernst & Young Entrepreneurs of the Year Award for Manufacturing.

In 2006, Cirrus accomplished all-time record deliveries, celebrating their 3,000th SR-series aircraft off the production line only seven years after deliveries commenced, something that no other aviation company had done in the last half-century. Thirty-five special edition turbocharged SR22s were released that same year. They were entitled "Signature Editions", and came with several additional features including the signatures of both Alan and Dale imprinted on the plane's cowling. In June 2007, the Klapmeiers—along with vice president of advanced development Mike Van Staagen—unveiled their next design, "The-Jet by Cirrus" (now known as the Vision SF50), a single-engine, composite, seven-seat very light jet aircraft, also intended to be equipped with the company's CAPS parachute. The first flight of the jet prototype occurred on July 3, 2008.

In September 2008, the global sales slump in piston-engined aircraft impacted the company and they laid off 100 workers, 8% of their workforce. This included 79 people at the main plant in Duluth, Minnesota, and 29 employees at the composite construction plant in Grand Forks, North Dakota. After this round of layoffs, Cirrus had 1,230 employees remaining. Alan, the then-CEO, announced in October 2008 that due to the economic recession and resulting lack of demand for Cirrus aircraft, the company was moving to a three-day work week. He reported that sales were down 10% over the same period in the previous year. Compared to the industry average in that same period, sales were down 16%.

Cirrus eliminated 208 employee positions in the fall of 2008 and cut aircraft production from 14 to 12 aircraft per week in response to the economic situation. In November of that year, the company announced that it would furlough about 500 production employees to allow for reductions in excess stock of aircraft produced.

On December 18, 2008, it was made public that chief operating officer Brent Wouters would replace Alan as CEO effective February 1, 2009. Alan continued as chairman of the board with Dale as vice-chairman.

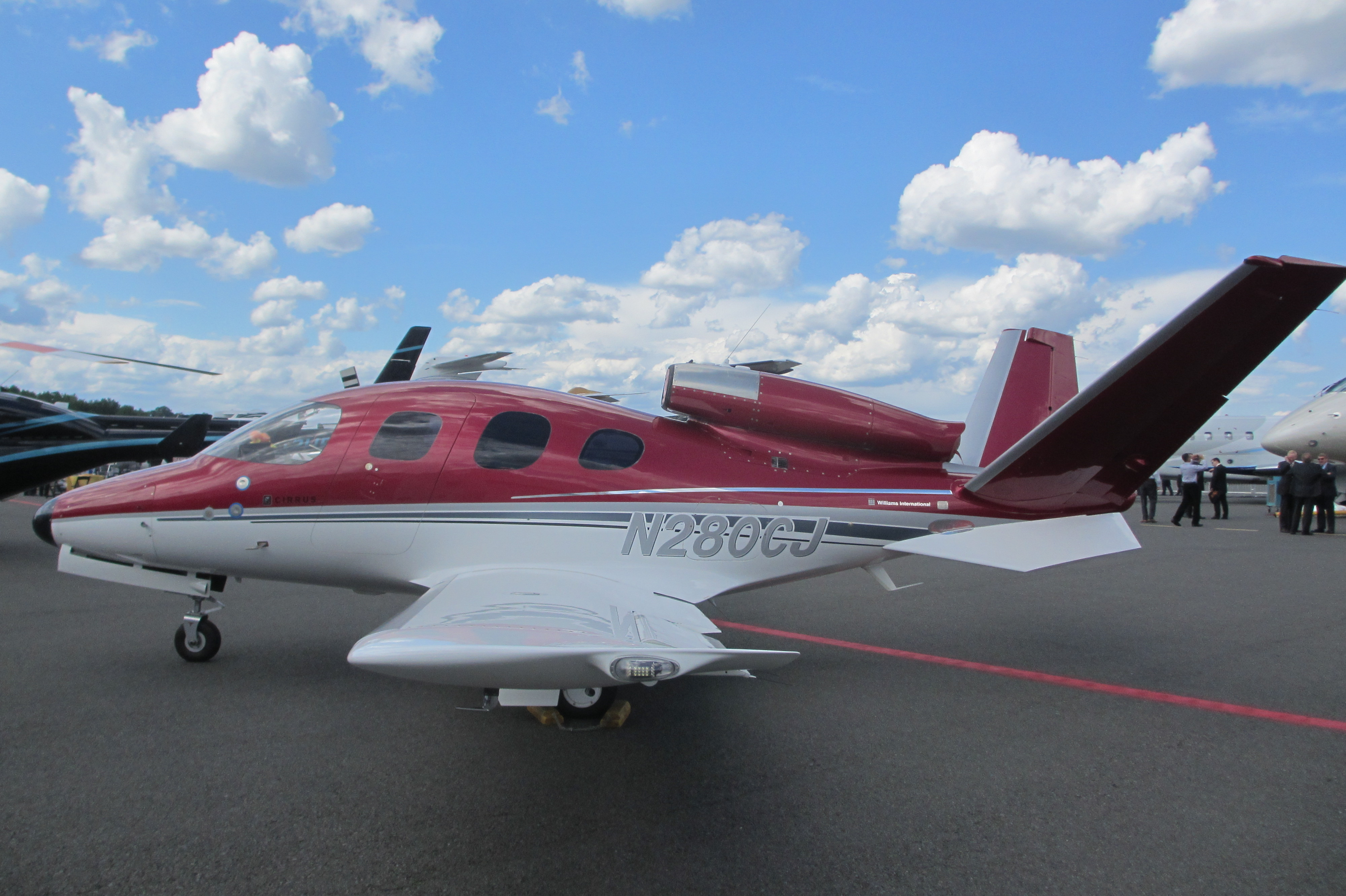
Cirrus Vision SF50 single-engine jet

On June 26, 2009, Alan announced that he had formed a team "of financial advisors and engineers" to try and acquire Cirrus's Vision SF50 jet program from its majority owner Arcapita and produce it under a new company, with Merrill Lynch involved in the negotiations. Dale, although not reported to be part of Alan's newly-assembled team, came out in support of his brother's efforts and said that Alan was the only person Cirrus would consider letting take over the jet project. However, more than a month after the announcement, the attempt failed and Wouters revealed that Alan's contract as chairman would not be renewed when it expired at the end of August (a decision Wouters said Alan had known about for "several months" prior). Alan left Cirrus soon after this while Dale stayed with the company.

==== 2010s: End of business partnership, separate career paths ====
===== Alan and Kestrel =====
At the 2010 EAA airshow, Alan introduced his new venture, the Kestrel Aircraft Company, and would serve as its CEO. Kestrel was to produce the Kestrel K-350, a single turboprop-engined all-composite six-seat aircraft. Some of his ex-Cirrus colleagues joined him in the project, including Steve Serfling, Cirrus' former director of product development. The company was originally set to locate its headquarters in Brunswick, Maine, but after complications with state tax credits, Alan decided in 2012 to move manufacturing operations to Superior, Wisconsin, where they received a better financial package. The total value of loans, grants and tax credits was $118 million, $112 million from the state, with the expected eventual creation of around 600 new jobs by 2016, the most in Superior since World War II. In 2013, Kestrel employed about 60 workers in Superior, located across the border from Cirrus, and about 40 in Brunswick, where composite components for the plane were being created.

In May 2014, it was reported that Kestrel had fallen months behind on loan payments to the Wisconsin Economic Development Corporation (WEDC) due to financing delays. Alan spoke on the matter saying, "We're obviously still very excited about the program. We've made a lot of progress on the design, what we expect to build, what we expect to do with the FAA, but there are other frustrations. Certainly financing the project has been slower than we had hoped and expected." It was also reported that the delay in financing had impacted hiring, causing the company to reduce its staff in Superior.

On 15 April 2015, Kestrel merged with Albuquerque, New Mexico-based Eclipse Aerospace to form One Aviation, with Alan appointed CEO. The company faced many legal and financial challenges. In September 2015, Alan indicated that Kestrel's resulting lack of economic and developmental progress "never would have happened if the state [of Wisconsin] had come through with the financing on time." He told AINonline in 2017 that development of the K-350 "had been shelved" while One Aviation focuses on certifying the Eclipse 700 very light jet, with Wisconsin taking legal action against the Kestrel division of One. In October 2018, the company voluntarily filed for Chapter 11 bankruptcy. A bankruptcy exit plan was approved in September 2019 for Chinese company Citiking International to purchase One Aviation, however, by October 2020, it was reported that Citiking had been "ousted from the sale process" and in February 2021, One Aviation entered Chapter 7 liquidation.

===== Dale and Cirrus =====
In September 2009, Dale became interim chairman of Cirrus. On 19 September 2011, Cirrus named him the new CEO, and announced that Brent Wouters "is no longer with the company". In April 2012, after more than three years of significant financial struggle, the company informed that its Vision SF50 jet program was fully funded through certification and early production, with a major investment from their newly acquired owners China Aviation Industry General Aircraft Company (CAIGA) (an acquisition that was initially met with much local skepticism at the time of its announcement in early 2011). Dale called the jet investment a "tremendous milestone" for the company and said that the new owners "are actively partnering with Cirrus while providing substantial resources for us to meet and exceed our shared goals."

In 2013 and 2014, Cirrus had its strongest years in sales and deliveries since before the 2008 recession, naming its SR22/22T model the best-selling general aviation airplane for the 12th year in a row and making Cirrus the world's largest producer of piston-powered aircraft with a nearly 40% market share. The company flew three new Vision SF50 conforming prototypes and employed over 800 people in 2014, having hired more than 300 of them in the past three years. In May 2015, Dale and chief customer officer Todd Simmons announced that Cirrus will be expanding to an additional facility in Knoxville, Tennessee, called the "Vision Center", where all customer activities for the company will take place.

On 28 October 2016, Cirrus received type certification for the SF50, making it the first single-engine civilian jet to become certified with the FAA. Deliveries began in December 2016. In June 2018, Dale accepted the Collier Trophy on behalf of Cirrus and the Vision Jet team. The trophy is awarded for "the greatest achievement in aeronautics or astronautics in America" during the preceding year.

On 19 December 2018, it was made public that Dale will step down as CEO sometime in the first-half of 2019 and transition into a senior advisory role for the company. On 4 June 2019, Cirrus announced that former Tesla Inc. executive Zean Nielsen had been selected to succeed Dale as its next CEO. By the end of 2019, Cirrus had 1,600 employees and accomplished its best year ever in sales, naming its Vision SF50 the most-delivered general aviation jet for the last two years and introducing its "Safe Return" emergency autoland system by Garmin.

== Management style distinctions ==
During the three decades they worked together professionally, Alan was known as the more talkative, risk-taking "dreamer" of the two, whereas Dale was considered to be the more taciturn, hands-on "practical one". Described by the EAA Aviation Museum as Alan being "the thinker" and Dale "the tinkerer", many say this is partly what made the duo successful—Alan would come up with creative ideas and Dale would figure out how to get them done.

Dale told the Duluth News Tribune in 2009 that, "The difference between the two of us is that Alan is a dreamer, and he's extremely aggressive in what he wants. I'm far more conservative than he is, and I've always loved the hands-on stuff"; and Alan told Airport Journals in 2006 that, "Dale is more practical [than me]—unbelievably practical, in fact. Dale figures out how to make [the designs] work."

Throughout most of the brothers' early career, Alan administered as president at Cirrus with Dale as vice president. In a 1999 IndustryWeek cover story on the Klapmeiers, Alan joked that he was president simply "because he is the older brother"; and in an article published by Aircraft Spruce in 2012, about the Klapmeiers' homebuilding efforts throughout the 1980s, Dale credited Alan with being "the inspiration, the driving force" behind their goals.

== Boards and other affiliations ==
The Klapmeier brothers have both served on numerous aviation boards and programs. Alan served on the advisory board for MVP Aero Inc., as well as the boards of AOPA's Air Safety Foundation, AERObridge, Build-A-Plane, the Small Aircraft Manufacturers Association (SAMA), and the General Aviation Manufacturers Association (GAMA), acting as the organization's chairman in 2008. He is currently on the boards of the Experimental Aircraft Association (EAA) and Bob Hoover Legacy Foundation (BHLF). Dale served on the advisory board for the Aircraft Kit Industry Association (AKIA), as well as the boards of the Red Tail Project (now Red Tail Squadron), EAA's Young Eagles Program, the founding boards of the Scott D. Anderson Leadership Foundation (SALF) and AirSpace Minnesota, and NASA's Aeronautics Research & Technology Roundtable, chairing its general aviation subcommittee in 2013. He is currently on the board of the Aircraft Owners and Pilots Association (AOPA) and the advisory board of Skyryse.

In 2003, Alan and Dale donated a fully operational SR20 to the Museum of Flight in Seattle, Washington, as a learning tool for school students. Ten years later, Dale donated an SR22 to Minneapolis-based STEM learning center AirSpace Minnesota.

For much of the 2000s, Alan was part-owner of Bluewater Yachts, a central-Minnesota boat-manufacturing company that the brothers' uncle founded in the 1970s, with the slogan "Different By Design".

Dale participates in an annual fundraising event called the "Black Woods Blizzard Tour", a snowmobile excursion around northern Minnesota that raises money to fight ALS. He has also been involved in the charity flight organization Angel Flight West.

== Personal lives ==
There have been reports of a bitter personal falling-out between the Klapmeier brothers that occurred around the time of Alan's departure from Cirrus in 2009. Alan told the Milwaukee Journal Sentinel in 2012 that he had not spoken to Dale in several years but would not discuss the reasons why on record.

General Aviation News reported in 2011 that Alan had considered running for Congress, although he ultimately decided against it.

In March 2014, Alan brought Cirrus to court over a violated non-disparagement clause involving a 2011 interview with former Cirrus CEO Brent Wouters, in which Wouters allegedly criticized Alan's ability to lead a large company during times of "economic downturn". A Minnesota jury awarded Alan $10 million in lost profits and out-of-pocket expenses. Cirrus, which was under the leadership of Dale at the time, appealed the verdict and the state Court of Appeals overturned the ruling in a 2–1 decision, stating that the calculation of damages was "too speculative" and failed to demonstrate the amount to a "reasonable degree of certainty". The Minnesota Supreme Court denied to hear Alan's appeal and the lawsuit ended in December 2015.

Alan was married to Sara Dougherty from 2002 until their divorce in 2016. Together with his first wife, Patti Graves, whom he was married to from 1987 to 1999, he has two daughters: Kathryn (born 1989) and Sarah (born 1993).

Dale has been married to Patricia Meyer since 1984 and together they have two sons: Ryan (born 1988) and Blake (born 1992).

Dale expressed in a 2008 interview that the main objective the brothers and their design team used for the Cirrus SR20 was that it had to be an airplane Patricia would choose to travel in more than a car, a realization he said "changed the direction of the company" in the 1990s with a greater focus on the passenger in all their future designs. This motivation for the SR series was further discussed in a 2025 episode of Jay Leno's Garage.

== Reputation and recognition ==
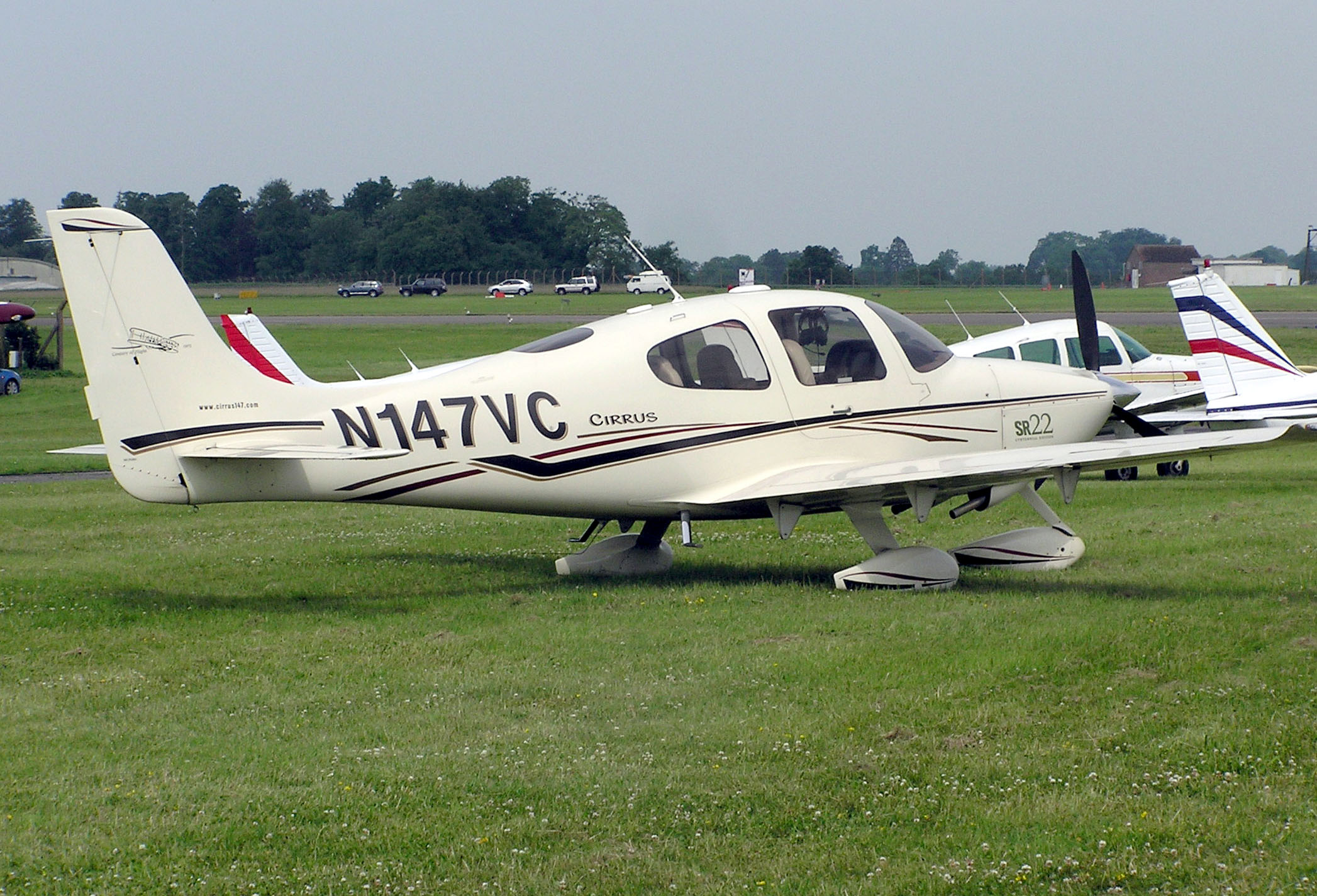
Klapmeiers' Wright brothers-inspired SR22 in 2005

Through Cirrus, the Klapmeier brothers are credited with revolutionizing the personal aircraft industry for the modern era.

They have been referenced several times in national articles and columns such as The Atlantic and The New York Times Magazine by journalist, author and former speechwriter for President Jimmy Carter, James Fallows, who said in a 2010 article that the brothers "absolutely transformed what had been a stagnant, declining industry." They were also a central theme in Fallows' 2001 book, Free Flight: Inventing the Future of Travel, as well as a supporting theme in his 2012 book, China Airborne.

Aviation communities have often compared the Klapmeier brothers to the Wright brothers, giving them the nickname, "modern-day Wright brothers". Some say this gave more public sentiment to Cirrus' 2003 release of the "Centennial Edition", an SR22 that celebrated 100 years of flight with a mural of the Wright Flyer coating the tail of the plane. The story of Cirrus has also garnered comparisons to Apple Inc., while Alan and Dale have been called "aviation’s equivalent of Steve Jobs and Steve Wozniak".

The first time the Klapmeiers gained national exposure was in 1998 when radio commentator Paul Harvey spoke positively about Cirrus and the SR20 on his syndicated program. In the 2004 vice-presidential debate, former Vice President Dick Cheney indirectly mentioned the Klapmeier brothers, calling them and Cirrus "a great success story". The Klapmeiers have also been praised for their efforts by former Minnesota Governor Tim Pawlenty. After a visit to the Duluth Cirrus factory in 2003, Pawlenty thanked Alan and Dale for "their foresight in creating a new aircraft, bringing it to the market, and the associated risks they took to make it happen." The late 18-term Minnesota Congressman Jim Oberstar was a strong supporter of the Klapmeiers as well, and was one of the main proponents behind bringing Cirrus to Duluth, Minnesota in 1994—along with Cirrus vice president of business administration Bill King and former Duluth Mayor Gary Doty.

The Klapmeier brothers received the Living Legends of Aviation award in 2007 at a ceremony in Beverly Hills, California. Among the attendees that year were aerospace pioneers and celebrities such as Bob Hoover, Buzz Aldrin, Clay Lacy, Michael Dorn, Patty Wagstaff, Cliff Robertson, Chuck Yeager, and many more.

British business magnate Alan Sugar said that he admired the Klapmeier brothers for starting Cirrus from "virtually scratch", and for their use of technologies like ballistic parachutes, glass cockpits and manufactured composite airframes.

Besides Lance Neibauer of Lancair, who delivered nearly 600 Columbia-series aircraft, the Klapmeier brothers are the only kit-makers to ever successfully transition into the design and production of certified aircraft. In both separate cases, the EAA served as a crucial "training ground" for Neibauer and the Klapmeiers to stimulate their ambitions.

Since 2022, the brothers are featured in the Smithsonian Institution's National Air and Space Museum along with a 2003 Cirrus SR22 (N266CD), the first piston aircraft with a full glass cockpit.

== Awards and accolades ==
External videos
- Klapmeier brothers receiving the EAA Freedom of Flight Award from Tom Poberezny in 2007

- EAA's Dr. August Raspet Memorial Award - 1992
- MnDOT's NASAO Award - 2004 (Alan Klapmeier & Cirrus)
- Ernst & Young Entrepreneurs of the Year for Manufacturing - 2004
- Admiral Luis de Florez Flight Safety Award - 2005 (Alan Klapmeier)
- CAFE Foundation's PADA Trophy - 2006 (Alan Klapmeier)
- Living Legends of Aviation Award—Entrepreneurs of the Year - 2006
- Aero Club of New England's Dr. Godfrey L. Cabot Award - 2007
- EAA's Freedom of Flight Award - 2007
- Joel Labovitz Entrepreneurial Achievement Award - 2008
- Oshkosh, Wisconsin's Key to the City Award - 2008
- Deke Slayton Airfest's Distinguished Wisconsin Aviators Award - 2009
- Wiley Post Spirit Award - 2011 (Dale Klapmeier)
- Fliegermagazin's Industry Leader of the Year - 2012 (Dale Klapmeier)
- Ranked No. 17 on Flying Magazine's list of the 51 Heroes of Aviation - 2013
- National Aviation Hall of Fame Inductees - 2014
- Minnesota Business Hall of Fame Inductee - 2015 (Dale Klapmeier)
- Atlanta Aero Club’s Phoenix Award - 2015 (Alan Klapmeier)
- Angel Flight West's Inspiration Endeavor Award - 2018 (Dale Klapmeier & Cirrus)
- Minnesota Aviation Hall of Fame Inductee - 2022 (Dale Klapmeier)
- October 23 is named "Klapmeier Brothers Day" in Orillia, Ontario - 2024 (Note: 23 October 1998 was the day the first SR Series aircraft, the SR20, became certified with the FAA.)

== See also ==
- B&F Fk14 Polaris (Cirrus SR Sport)
- Paul Poberezny - who helped popularize grassroots aviation, founder of the EAA
- Boris Popov - who invented a ballistic parachute for use in ultralights, founder of BRS
- Burt Rutan - who pioneered the use of composites in homebuilts and spacecraft
