= L-3 SmartDeck =

Electronic flight instrument system

L-3 SmartDeck - is a fully integrated cockpit system originally developed by L-3 Avionics Systems. and acquired in 2010 by Esterline CMC Electronics through an exclusive licensing agreement.

SmartDeck is one of the many systems available today known as a “glass cockpit.” Popularized by large transport category aircraft in the 1980s, the glass cockpit is a high technology cockpit configuration in which the traditional flight instruments and gauges are replaced by computer screens that combine information into an organized and user friendly format. As computer technology advances, glass cockpit systems are declining in cost and becoming available in smaller general aviation aircraft. These technologies are often able to offer pilots more flight information than would be available in a conventional style cockpit and many feature a high level of automation that can aid the pilot in navigation and system monitoring.

L-3 created SmartDeck as an alternative to other glass cockpit systems currently on the market. The major design objectives of integration and ease of use were achieved by designing the menu structure with a “three-clicks-or-less” philosophy similar to the Apple iPod and by incorporating navigation, weather, traffic and terrain avoidance, communication, flight controls, engine monitoring and enhanced vision into one cockpit system. This is achieved by combining a number of L-3's situational awareness technologies into the system.

At the National Business Aviation Association annual convention in October 2010, CMC Electronics announced that it had acquired the SmartDeck technology from L-3 and L-3 ceased all development. CMC has continued the development and, as of March 2012, was expecting to announce a launch customer in the near future.

== Components and features ==
- As configured for a Cirrus SR22

The user interface for a basic SmartDeck system consists of one primary flight display (PFD), one multi-function display (MFD), one flight display controller (FDC), and a center console unit (CCU) display system. Other components include two air data attitude and heading reference systems (ADAHRS), two data concentrators, two magnetometers, two WAAS GPS receivers, two nav/com radios with a PS Engineering audio panel, a transponder and the S-TEC Intelliflight 1950 Integrated Digital Flight Control System (DFCS). SmartDeck interfaces with the L-3 Avionics SkyWatch collision avoidance system, Landmark terrain awareness warning system (TAWS B), Stormscope lightning detection system and IRIS Infrared Imaging System, among other avionics technologies. The SmartDeck system is customizable for different customers and platforms.

SmartDeck features a high level of redundancy that offers added safety in the event of a system failure. The dual ADAHRS continuously compare flight data and alert the pilot if the difference between the two units exceeds a predefined tolerance; during an ADAHRS miscompare, both flight displays will act as PFDs and the discrepancy will be highlighted. This is known as reversionary mode, a condition in which both screens combine all the standard PFD information with a number of key MFD functions.

Each component in the system is connected via a dual IEEE 1394 interface, also known as FireWire. This high speed connection interface is common on high-speed computers and is also used on military aircraft such as the F-22 Raptor and F-35 Lightning II. Users can monitor the system health on the MFD during flight and will be notified in the event of a failed connection; however, the system will continue to function normally as long as part of the redundant network connections remain linked.

=== Primary Flight Display (PFD) ===
The chief purpose of the SmartDeck Primary Flight Display is to provide the attitude, airspeed, altitude, turn rate, vertical speed and course information available in the standard six pack of a conventional cockpit. In addition, the PFD gives autopilot mode information, abbreviated engine parameters, glide slope and localizer information and winds aloft. Quick reference true airspeed, ground speed, density altitude, outside air temperature, bearing, ground track, DME data, and time en route data are also displayed on the PFD. Dedicated buttons along the bottom of the PFD are used to change the reference bugs for indicated airspeed, course, heading, altitude and vertical speed as well as the barometer setting and source for navigation information. The reference bug settings also control the autopilot and flight director.

SmartDeck's PFD is also equipped with synthetic vision, a 3D rendering of obstacles, terrain and airports that allows the pilot to see "through" weather and darkness. The image moves in real time with the aircraft and presents a clear view of the outside environment.

=== Multi Function Display (MFD) ===
SmartDeck's MFD contains a host of flight information available on a number of “pages” dedicated to different functions. Each page features its own menu and submenus that are used to control the display options. The amount of information available on each screen is customizable and much of the information can be combined onto one page to decrease the need for frequently changing screens.

==== Map Page ====
The map page is displayed for the majority of a routine flight on the MFD to aid the pilot in navigation and to assist with situational awareness. A moving map can be displayed in a VFR or IFR format on the MFD with an aircraft icon that represents the aircraft's present position. A number of selectable options allow the pilot to easily customize the detail level of the moving map. Selectable map overlays include:

- Airport identifiers
- Airspace boundaries
- VORs and VOR compass roses
- NDBs
- Localizers
- Jet and Victor airways
- Intersections
- Holds
- Obstacles
- Geopolitical boundaries
- Highways and roads

Additionally, pilot selectable traffic, weather and terrain information is available on dedicated thumbnails or overlaid on the map. A thumbnail overlay for an enhanced vision display is also available.

During instrument approaches or while performing SIDs and STARs, a chart overlay option is available on the map page. Chart overlay gives aircraft position on the designated Jeppessen chart in lieu of the map. This function allows the pilot to maintain additional situational awareness throughout the approach and departure phases of the flight.

==== Auxiliary Page ====
The auxiliary page combines a large amount of aircraft system data into one easy to navigate page. The various submenus of the auxiliary page display aircraft systems, such as engine parameters and electrical; system health, which displays connections of different components; and subsystems, like GPS or transponder functionality. Also available on the Aux page are normal, abnormal and emergency checklists, aircraft performance charts and a setup page for customization of the PFD and MFD screens. Checklist progress is maintained when switching to other pages giving the pilot quick access to procedures without hindering safe navigation.

==== Center Console Unit (CCU) ====
The SmartDeck CCU is a smaller display screen used for entering flight plan data, obtaining airport information, and entering nav/com frequencies or transponder codes. SmartDeck is the only glass cockpit system in the light aircraft market that includes a display dedicated to such functions. Because radio frequencies, flight plan data and airport info can also be manipulated on the MFD, SmartDeck provides a “feature in use” annunciation if the user is accessing or modifying information in two places at once.

When airways or instrument approaches are loaded into a flight plan, the CCU will automatically change to the appropriate navigation frequencies as the flight progresses. The system displays the location identifier next to communication frequencies when selected from the database and identifies the Morse code ID for navigation frequencies. A save feature allows up to 30 flight plans with as many as 100 waypoints to be saved on the unit.

==== Autopilot ====
The S-TEC Intelliflight 1950 DFCS is the integrated autopilot used with SmartDeck. It is a two-axis attitude-based digital autopilot with a flight director. Autopilot controls are located on the CCU and include heading, nav, approach, indicated airspeed hold, vertical speed hold, and altitude hold buttons. With the autopilot engaged, the system can fly full instrument approaches and holds automatically as well as pilot created holds using the “place hold” function. After the desired mode is activated, autopilot parameters such as vertical speed and heading are selected using dedicated buttons along the bottom of the PFD and changed with a concentric control knob on the Flight Data Controller. The various autopilot modes include:

Lateral Guidance Modes

  - Roll mode
  - VOR en route nav mode
  - Localizer en route nav mode
  - GPS lateral nav mode
  - VOR approach nav mode
  - Localizer approach nav mode
  - GPS approach nav mode
  - Back course approach nav mode
  - HDG mode

Vertical Guidance Modes

  - Vertical speed mode
  - Indicated airspeed hold mode
  - Altitude capture
  - Altitude hold
  - Go-around
  - Glide Slope mode
  - Altitude capture glide slope mode

== Certification ==
SmartDeck has received Technical Standard Order (TSO) Authorization and Supplemental Type Certification (STC) from the FAA. The system was certified in a Cirrus SR22. A limited STC is available through aftermarket dealers for installation on the Cirrus SR22 G2 model aircraft. L-3 was also awarded the development phase for Cirrus’ new “Cirrus Vision SF50”. Later in the program, Cirrus decided to switch to a similar system by Garmin, prompting L-3 to sue them for $18M.

== Competitors ==
Following FAA certification, SmartDeck will compete directly with the Garmin G1000, Avidyne Entegra, Chelton FlightLogic and the Collins Pro Line series.
