= Cirrus Airframe Parachute System =

Aircraft parachute system

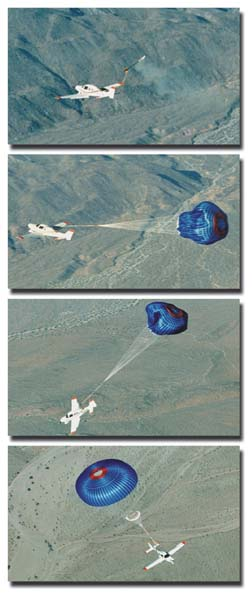
Photo series showing a Cirrus SR20 deploying the Cirrus Airframe Parachute System (CAPS) during inflight testing in 1998

The Cirrus Airframe Parachute System (CAPS) is a whole-plane ballistic parachute recovery system designed specifically for Cirrus Aircraft's line of general aviation light aircraft including the SR20, SR22 and SF50. The design became the first of its kind to become certified with the FAA, achieving certification in October 1998, and as of 2022 was the only aircraft ballistic parachute used as standard equipment by an aviation company. (Note: The ICON A5 includes a ballistic parachute as standard only for models registered in the U.S.)

Developed as a collaboration between Cirrus and Ballistic Recovery Systems (BRS), it was adapted from the GARD (General Aviation Recovery Device) initially released for the Cessna 150. As in other BRS systems, a small solid-fuel rocket housed in the aft fuselage is used to pull the parachute out from its housing and deploy the canopy full within seconds. The goal of employing this system is the survival of the crew and passengers and not necessarily the prevention of damage to the airframe.

== History ==
=== Design and development ===
Since the landing gear and firewall are a part of the structure designed to be crushed for energy absorption during impact after parachute deployment, Cirrus originally thought that the airframe would be damaged beyond repair on ground-impact, but the first aircraft to deploy (N1223S) landed in a field of mesquite trees and was not badly damaged. Cirrus bought the airframe back, repaired it, and used it as a demo plane.

Dating back to the first conception of the Cirrus SR20 in the early 1990s, the aircraft was intended to come equipped with CAPS. Because of this, Cirrus designed a special kind of "spin resistant" wing (or leading edge cuff) for the SR20, a concept originally developed at NASA Langley, which makes it more difficult for the plane to enter a spin. However, increasing the difficulty of entering a spin inherently makes it more difficult to recover from one if a spin does occur. The FAA accepted the parachute as a sufficient mode of spin recovery and complete spin testing was not required. Nonetheless, in 2004 Cirrus completed a limited series of spin recovery tests to meet European Aviation Safety Agency (EASA) requirements and no unusual characteristics were found.

==== Vision Jet ====
The first jet with a ballistic parachute, the Cirrus Vision SF50 single-engine jet was certified in October 2016 with CAPS (where it deploys from the nose of the aircraft instead of the aft cabin). Despite the FAA not requiring Cirrus to test the device since it was not necessary for certification, Business Insider released video in May 2017 showing CAPS being tested inflight with a piloted SF50 prototype.

In 2018, Cirrus won the Collier Trophy for the Vision Jet, due in part to the aircraft's inclusion of CAPS. The award is presented annually for "the greatest achievement in aeronautics or astronautics in America, with respect to improving the performance, efficiency, and safety of air or space vehicles".

=== Background ===
Cirrus founders brothers Alan and Dale Klapmeier set out to implement CAPS on all their future Cirrus models after Alan survived a mid-air collision in 1985, where his plane lost more than three feet of wing including half the aileron; the pilot in the other aircraft spiraled into the ground and was killed. These efforts contributed to the Klapmeier brothers' 2014 induction into the National Aviation Hall of Fame.

The Cirrus engineering & design team, led by chief engineer Paul Johnston, started developing CAPS on the SR20 in Duluth, Minnesota, during the mid-1990s. It was first tested in 1998 over the high desert of southern California by Air National Guard F-16 pilot and Cirrus chief test pilot, Scott D. Anderson. At the time of testing, Cirrus only had two SR20 prototypes, so in order to test the parachute repeatedly, Anderson would restart the engine mid-air while descending under the parachute, cut the chute loose and land the plane for it to be tested again (ground-impact testing took place with a mockup that would be dropped at the calculated descent-velocity and measured based on sustained damage to the landing gear, fuselage and crash-test dummies). Anderson completed all eight of the in-flight test deployments of CAPS for development and certification of the SR20.

=== Operational history ===
The first emergency deployment occurred in 2002 over Lewisville, Texas; one pilot of a Cirrus SR22 was uninjured. The first emergency deployment in a Vision Jet occurred in 2022 near Kissimmee, Florida; two occupants were uninjured while a third had "non life-threatening injuries".

As of 21 September 2021, CAPS had been activated 126 times, 107 of which saw successful parachute deployment. In those successful deployments, there were 220 survivors and one death. No deaths had occurred when the parachute was deployed within the certified speed and altitude parameters, and two anomalous unsuccessful deployments had occurred within those parameters. Some other accidental deployments were reported, as caused by ground impact or post-impact fires. As of 24 October 2019, 21 of the aircraft that had deployed CAPS had been repaired and put back into service.

Since 2011, which saw 16 deadly crashes of SR-series aircraft, the series has seen more CAPS deployments and steadily fewer deadly accidents, giving them one of the best safety records in the industry. This was attributed to a new approach to training, particularly in when and how to deploy the parachute system.

== See also ==
- Rogallo wing
