= Aviation International News =

Aviation media company

- Website type: aviation news and media
- Headquarters: Midland Park, New Jersey
- Editors: Matt Thurber; Charles Alcock; Jennifer Leach English
- Website: www.ainonline.com
- Users: 38,000+ (2018)
- Launched: 1972; 54 years ago

Aviation International News (AIN Media Group / The Convention News Company) is a periodical and newspaper publisher about aviation, published through its website and in hard copy.

== History ==
The Convention News Company was founded by aviation editor James Holahan and publisher Wilson S. Leach in 1972 and published its first issues at that year's NBAA convention. Now branded as AIN Media Group, it has branched into other aviation sectors and other products, and still publishes NBAA Convention News.

In 2002, Aviation International News received an award for "excellent, accurate and insightful reporting of issues related to the business aviation industry" from the National Business Aviation Association at its 55th Annual Meeting & Convention.

== Publications ==
AIN Publications publishes the following media:

- Aviation International News is a monthly trade publication in print and digital focused on business aviation, delivered to 38,000 readers;
- AINalerts is a workweek daily newsletter with eight to 12 short articles on business aviation;
- AINonline is a news website covering the aviation industry: business aviation, air transport, defense and unmanned aerial vehicles;
- AIN's Airshow News & Convention News daily issues are published on-site at large airshows and conventions, producing three or four full-size free magazines with news, announcements and in-depth analyses: at ABACE, EBACE, LABACE, MEBAA and NBAA conventions, and Heli-Expo, Dubai Airshow, Farnborough Airshow, Paris Air Show, Singapore Airshow and Asian Aerospace;
- AINtv creates short aviation news videos posted on AINonline and on AINtv's YouTube channel.

=== Business Jet Traveler ===
Business Jet Traveler (ISSN: 1554-1339) is a magazine for business jet end-users: executives and other high-net-worth individuals. The magazine was published in print from 2003 through 2020. Beginning in 2021, it is exclusively online with the exception of an annual print buyers' guide. Its publishers want "to help maximize its readers' investment in private air transport." It reviews taxes, law, and finance; new and used jets; charter, jet cards and fractional-jet shares; travel and luxury autos.

It interviews prominent travelers, including Sir Richard Branson, Suze Orman, Wolfgang Puck, T. Boone Pickens, Rudy Giuliani, Mark Cuban, Donald Trump, Arnold Palmer, James Carville, Buzz Aldrin, William Shatner, Morgan Freeman, Herbie Hancock, and many other celebrities. Annual features include results of a Readers' Choice Poll.

BJTonline.com is Business Jet Traveler magazine companion website, including all of its print content plus online-only material, with a weekly newsletter, BJTwaypoints.
