= AVIC AG100 =

Chinese aircraft

The AG100 is a trainer aircraft, developed from the Cirrus SR22 range, made in China by AVIC.
