= Connecticut Center for Economic Analysis =

- Abbreviation: CCEA
- Formation: 1992
- Type: Research center
- Headquarters: Storrs, Connecticut
- Location: University of Connecticut
- Key people: Fred Carstensen
- Parent organization: University of Connecticut School of Business
- Website: ccea.uconn.edu

The Connecticut Center for Economic Analysis (CCEA) is a research center located within the University of Connecticut School of Business in Storrs, Connecticut. It specializes in economic impact studies, policy analysis, and forecasting for the state of Connecticut.

== History ==
The CCEA was established in 1992 at the request of then-Governor Lowell Weicker. Its primary mission was to provide the state government and citizens with reliable data regarding the local economy and to evaluate the potential economic impacts of proposed legislation and strategic investments.

The center is directed by Fred Carstensen, a professor of finance and economics at UConn, who has served in the role since 1998.

== Research and methodology ==
The CCEA conducts quantitative analysis on a variety of economic issues, including labor markets, transportation, tax policy, and technology. The center utilizes dynamic economic modeling, specifically software from Regional Economic Modeling, Inc. (REMI), to project the long-term effects of economic events and policy changes.

The center's research has been cited in discussions regarding the state's fiscal health, often appearing in regional media outlets such as the Hartford Courant and the CT Mirror.

=== Notable studies ===
The CCEA has produced numerous reports that have influenced state policy and economic development strategies. Notable studies include:

- Bioscience Connecticut: The center produced an analysis demonstrating the potential economic benefits of the "Bioscience Connecticut" initiative, a major investment in the UConn Health center and genomic research facilities. This study was used by Governor Dannel Malloy to support the $850 million initiative in 2011.
- State Parks: A 2011 study conducted for the Connecticut Department of Energy and Environmental Protection (DEEP) estimated that outdoor activities on state lands generate over $1 billion annually for the state economy.
- Fuel Cell Industry: The center has analyzed the economic impact of the fuel cell industry in Connecticut, projecting the sector's long-term potential for job creation and revenue.

== See also ==
- Economy of Connecticut
- University of Connecticut
