= Avidyne Entegra =

Electronic flight instrument system

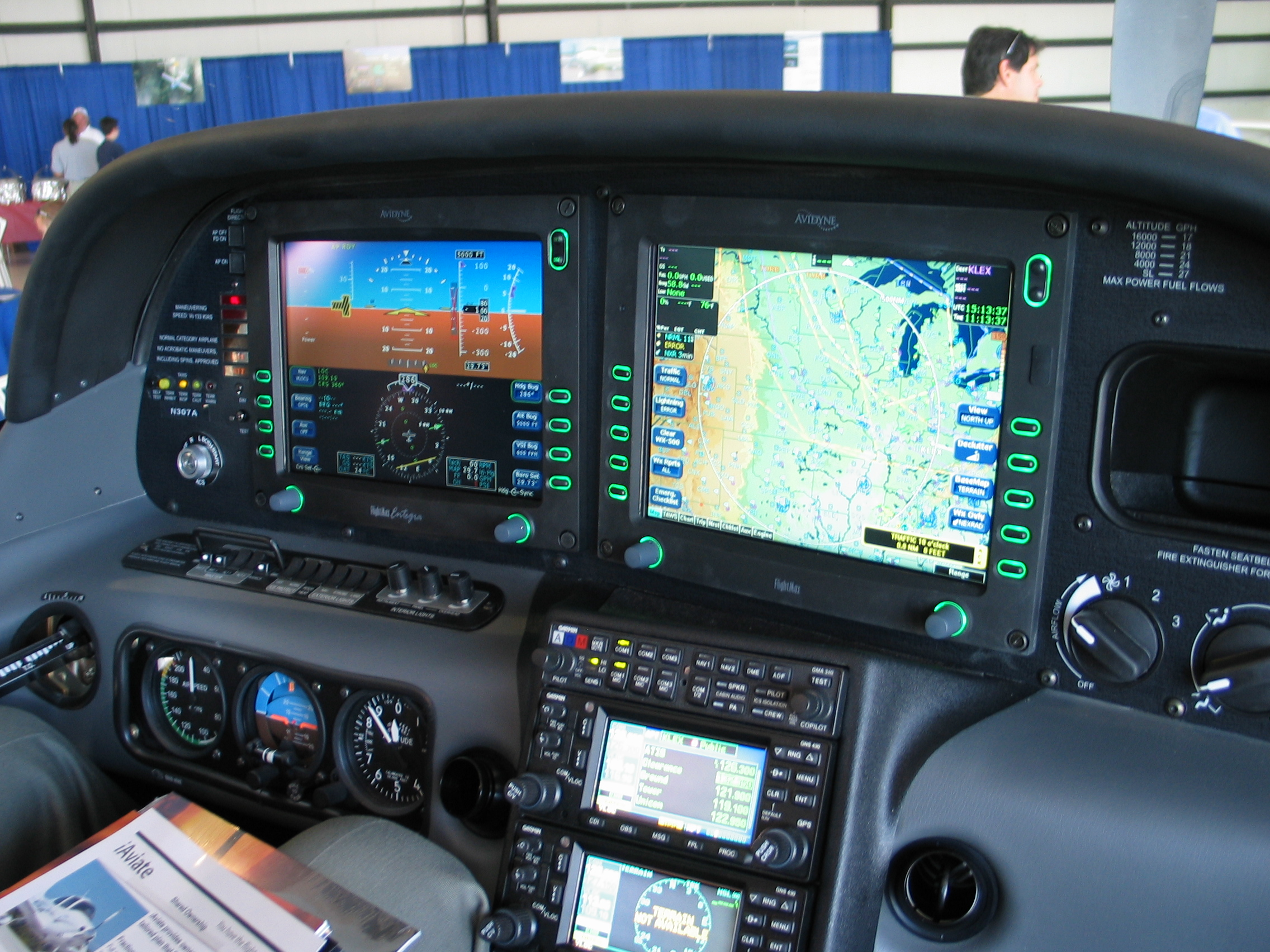
2006 Cirrus SR22 cockpit with Avidyne Entegra

Avidyne Entegra is an integrated aircraft instrumentation system ("glass cockpit"), produced by Avidyne Corporation, consisting of a primary flight display (PFD), and multi-function display (MFD). Cirrus became the first customer of the Entegra system and began offering it on the SR20 and SR22 aircraft in 2003 as the first integrated flight deck for light general aviation (GA). The original Entegra system was designed to use third-party components such as a GPS from Garmin and an autopilot system from S-TEC Corporation.

One of the advantages of these glass flight deck systems is upgradeability. Avidyne has demonstrated this with a continuous stream of hardware and software upgrades, including:

- 2004: Added CMax Electronic Charts and first to certify XM datalink for light GA.
- 2005 Added Primary Engine Instrumentation on PFD.
- 2006: Introduced Release 6, which added Flight Director, V-Speed & Heading on ADI, additional datalink weather products on the MFD, and support for the USB memory-stick data loader.
- 2007: Introduced Release 7, which added support for WAAS/LPV Approach guidance among other things.
- 2008: Introduced Release 8, which expanded weather product for Canadian, Mexico and Caribbean (METARS, TAFs, Color Lightning).
- 2009: Release 9, a hardware and software upgrade that was certified in April 2009.

Also Avidyne has introduced the DFC90 digital and attitude based autopilot for Entegra installations that replaces the S-TEC55X rate based autopilot and has advanced features like a "straight & level" button, envelope protection and IAS climb. To install the DFC90 A/P (which is a slide-in replacement for the 55X) the PFD has to be upgraded to WAAS standard.

With the introduction of the IFD navigators product range (IFD440/540/550) Entegra 8.x was not dependent of Garmin navigators anymore. The IFD440 COM/GPS/WAAS Navcoms are direct slide in replacements for the GNS430W navigators. Original Entegra systems with the non-WAAS GNS430 navigators need to get a PFD HW and SW upgrade before they can utilize 430W or IFD440 navigators which are capable of GPS/WAAS 3D approaches like LNAV/VNAV or LPV.

Navdata and Approach Charts on the MFD can be updated via the USB port on the MFD (which is not suitable for charging).

== System Redundancy ==
Entegra Release 9 system was designed with a fully redundant dual-databus architecture that eliminates traditional "Reversionary Modes."

A typical Entegra Release 9 installation features two large-format IFD5000 Integrated Flight Displays (IFD), which are fully interchangeable for use as PFD or MFD. Since each IFD5000 is fully capable of performing the functions of the other, no unfamiliar or limited reversionary modes are required. In the event of a display failure, the remaining IFD5000 continues to operate as either display format with no loss of functionality.

Some competing glass flight deck systems have limited redundancy, lose critical functionality such as datalink weather, traffic, or even autopilot, and their failure modes force the pilot to learn composite display symbology and "reversionary modes."

== GA Glass history ==
Avidyne was first to certify big glass for light GA with the 2003 launch of Entegra in Cirrus aircraft. This is considered a "first generation" big-glass system that integrates the six 3-inch instruments (6-pack) into a more usable package, along with an exceptionally reliable Air Data and Heading Reference System (ADAHRS) that replaces the "spinning mass" attitude and directional gyros. Entegra Release 8 still relies on a 'federated' radio stack (dual G430s) for GPS/NAV/COM capability, as well as audio and transponder.

Entegra R9 was meant to replace the original Entegra system in Cirrus Aircraft in 2007 but Cirrus went with the new G1000/Perspective system instead. For a short time Cirrus aircraft could be ordered with either Avidyne or Garmin avionics, today Garmin G1000 is the only option, it became the General Aviation market leader in glass cockpits. Avidyne still supports R8 (Entgra) and R9 systems and gave existing Entegra customers an upgrade path with the introduction of the DFC90 digital autopilot and the IFD4/5xx series of GPS navigators.

== Use ==
Avidyne Entegra systems are found in aircraft from such companies as:

- Cirrus Aircraft
- Columbia/Lancair Aircraft
- Piper Aircraft
- Spectrum Aeronautical
- Extra Aircraft

== Competition ==
The Avidyne Entegra competes with the Garmin G1000 and Chelton FlightLogic EFIS glass cockpits. However, there are significant differences with regard to the features, degree of integration, intuitive aspects of the design, and overall product utility. Note that the Chelton system is not typically found in airplanes that include the less expensive G1000 or Avidyne systems. Other competitors are Aspen Avionics and Dynon Avionics.
