= Cirrus SR20 =

Single-engine general aviation aircraft

SR20
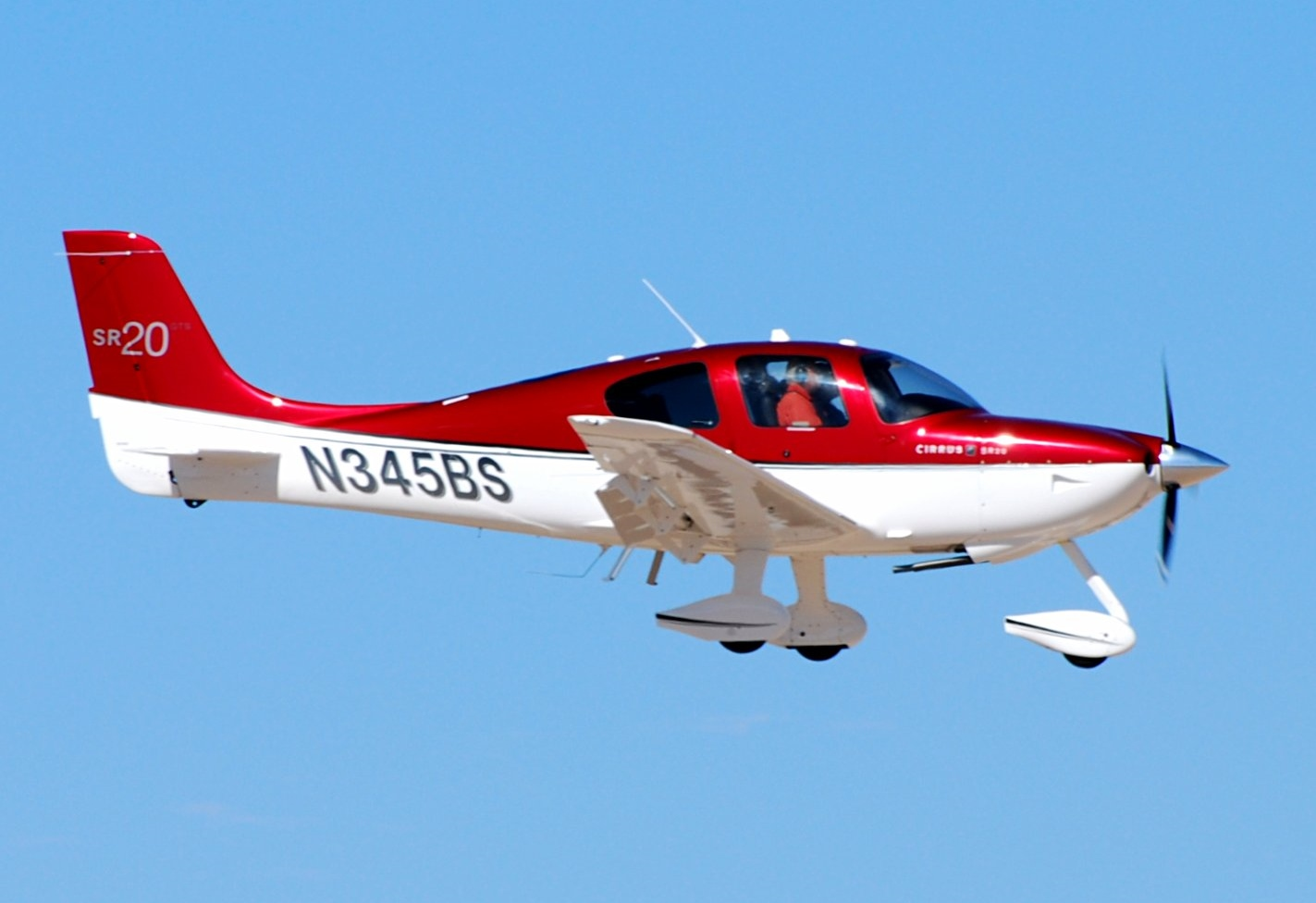

General information
- Type: Light aircraft
- Manufacturer: Cirrus Aircraft
- Number built: 2,084 (through 2025)

History
- Manufactured: 1999–present
- First flight: 21 March 1995
- Developed into: Cirrus SR22

The Cirrus SR20 is an American piston-engined, four- or five-seat composite monoplane built since 1999 by Cirrus Aircraft of Duluth, Minnesota. The aircraft is the company's earliest type-certified model, earning certification in 1998.

It was the first production general aviation (GA) aircraft equipped with a parachute to lower the airplane safely to the ground after a loss of control, structural failure, or midair collision. The SR series was also the first mass-manufactured light aircraft with all-composite construction and flat-panel avionics.

The SR20 was developed into the Cirrus SR22, which was introduced in 2001 and is the most-produced GA aircraft of the 21st century.

== Design and development ==
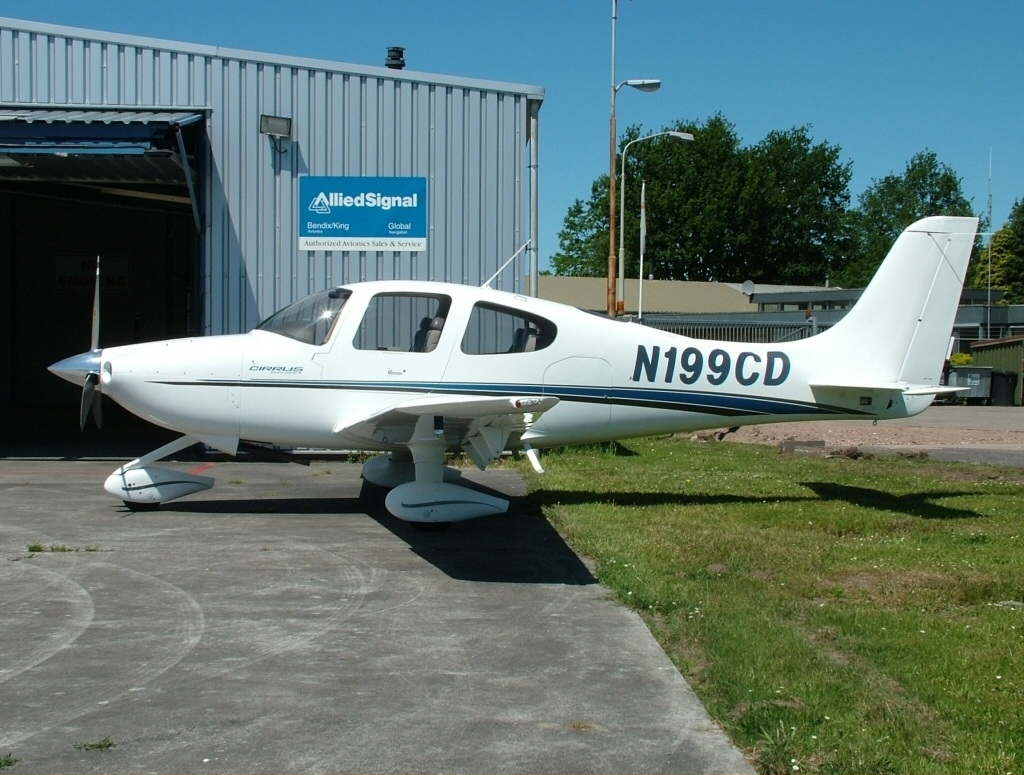
Early production model Cirrus SR20

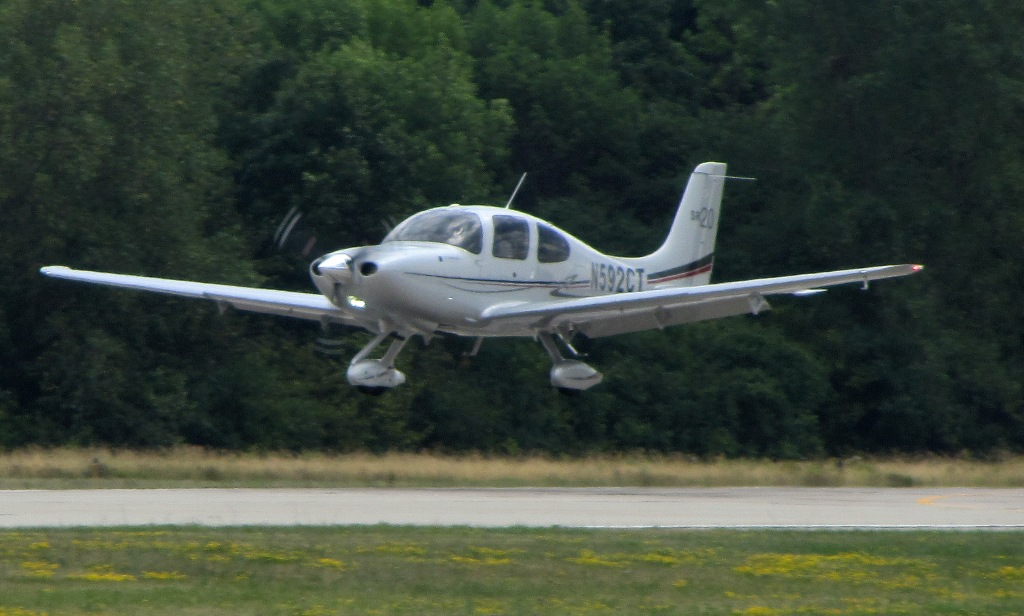
Cirrus SR20 landing

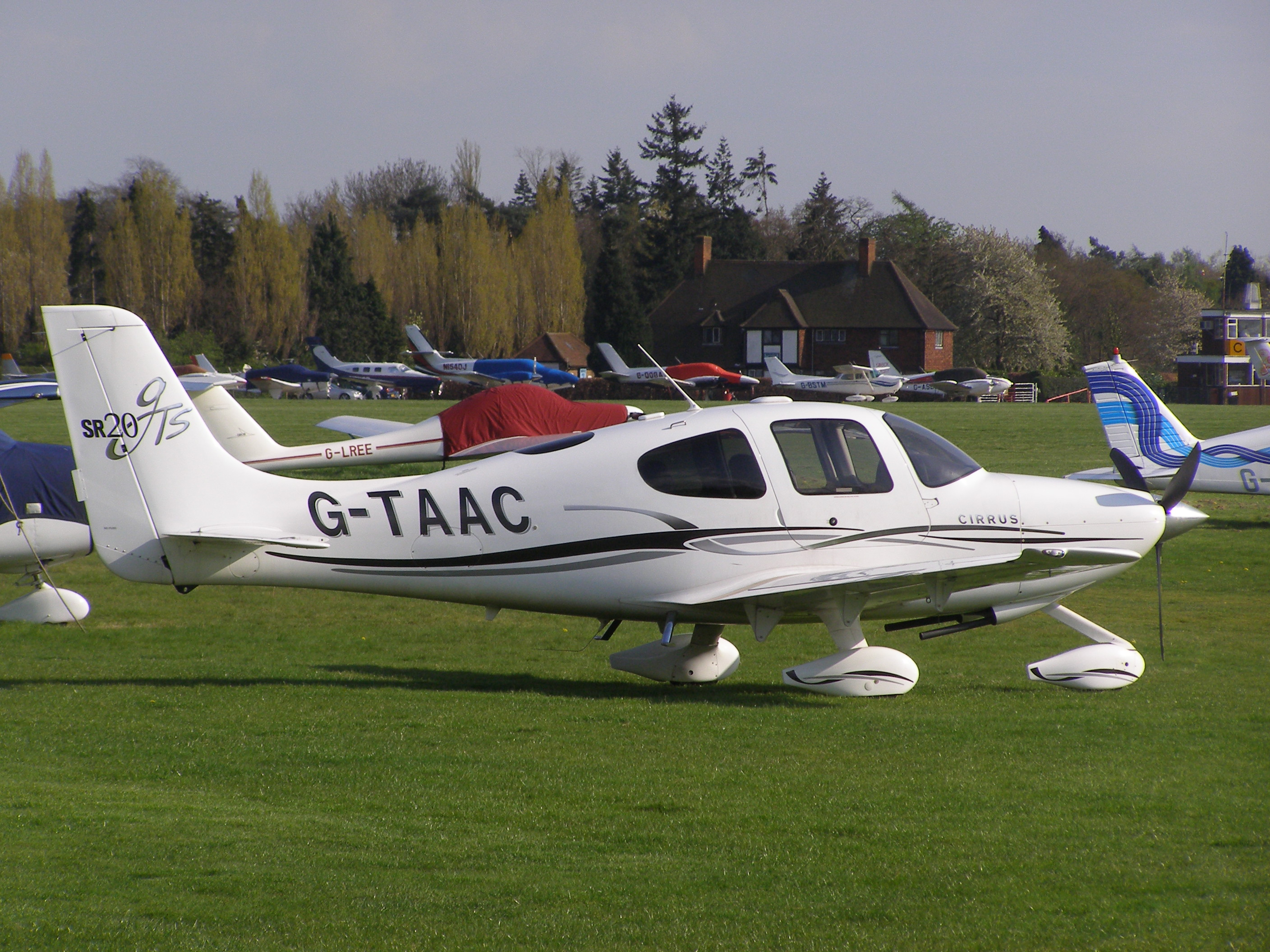
SR20 GTS

The SR20 mock-up was unveiled in 1994. The aircraft first flew on 21 March 1995 and FAA certification was achieved on 23 October 1998. At the time of the airplane's release, the GA industry was struggling; the SR20 was one of the first of its kind to earn FAA Part 23 certification in several years. Over a thousand SR20s have been sold since deliveries began in July 1999. From 1999 to 2015, more than 6,000 SR-series aircraft had been delivered, something that no other aviation company had accomplished for the last half-century.

One of the major selling points for the SR20 is its Garmin Cirrus Perspective avionics suite with dual 10-inch (250 mm) or 12-inch (300 mm) screens: one primary flight display (PFD) and one multifunction display (MFD), first introduced by the company in May 2008. This provides all standard communication, navigation (GPS and conventional VHF), and surveillance (Mode S transponder) functions. Other avionics features include in-flight weather information and TCAS-like traffic information.

SR20s made from 1999 to 2003 were equipped with traditional analog instruments and a 10" MFD. In July 2003, Cirrus made Avidyne Entegra PFDs standard on the SR20 and faster SR22, pioneering the use of glass cockpits in the light aircraft GA industry.

The SR-series remains the only airplane in its class to include side-stick flight controls that combine aspects of a traditional yoke handle (this has been referred to in the industry as a "side yoke").

The SR20 and SR22 are equipped with the Cirrus Airframe Parachute System (CAPS), a large parachute that can be deployed in an emergency to lower the entire aircraft to the ground safely.

On 1 June 2004, the SR20 became the first aircraft to achieve the new European Aviation Safety Agency certificate for aircraft imported into the European Union.

In 2004, Cirrus introduced the SR20 G2 (Generation 2) and in 2008, the SR20 G3 (Generation 3). Both were defined by airframe modifications, G2 by fuselage and G3 by wing/landing gear changes.

In 2012, "60/40 flex seating" was introduced, allowing up to three passengers in the rear with a split fold-down seat arrangement. This five-seat configuration was optional in 2012, but became standard equipment for 2013 SR20 models.

In 2016, Cirrus introduced enhancements to the SR series, including Bluetooth wireless connectivity, a remote keyless entry, a convenience lighting system, and a new easy-access door latch, among other interior and exterior improvements.

In 2017, the company introduced the SR20 G6 (Generation 6), with several upgrades to the avionics, new navigation lights, and an increased useful load.

In September 2019, Cirrus unveiled the TRAC, a training-oriented version of the SR20, with a simplified interior, more durable seat material, backseat radio transmit switch to allow an observer to communicate with air traffic control, electronic stability and protection system, integrated engine indication and crew alerting/warning systems, and simulated retractable landing gear controls and position lights to allow cadets and instructors to feign landing-gear operation and failures during instructional flights (the actual landing gear remains permanently fixed).

In January 2020, the company introduced a new mobile application for the SR series, called "Cirrus IQ", which enables remote aircraft communication including access to preflight status information such as fuel and oxygen levels, battery voltage, oil temperature, aircraft location, and flight hours. Upgrades also included a new stabilized approach-advisory system for the flight deck. In January 2022, speed and aesthetic improvements were added to the G6 SR-series, with a 9 knots (17 km/h) increased cruise speed, upgrades to the mobile IQ app, USB-A and USB-C charging ports and more.

In January 2024, the company announced the SR20 G7 (Generation 7), with a major overhaul to the interior and avionics, making it more comparable to the cockpit of a Cirrus Vision Jet, as well as safety and engine-start improvements and an automatic fuel selection system. In May 2025, Cirrus introduced the G7+, which added its Safe Return emergency autoland system as the first piston aircraft with autoland.

== Operational history ==
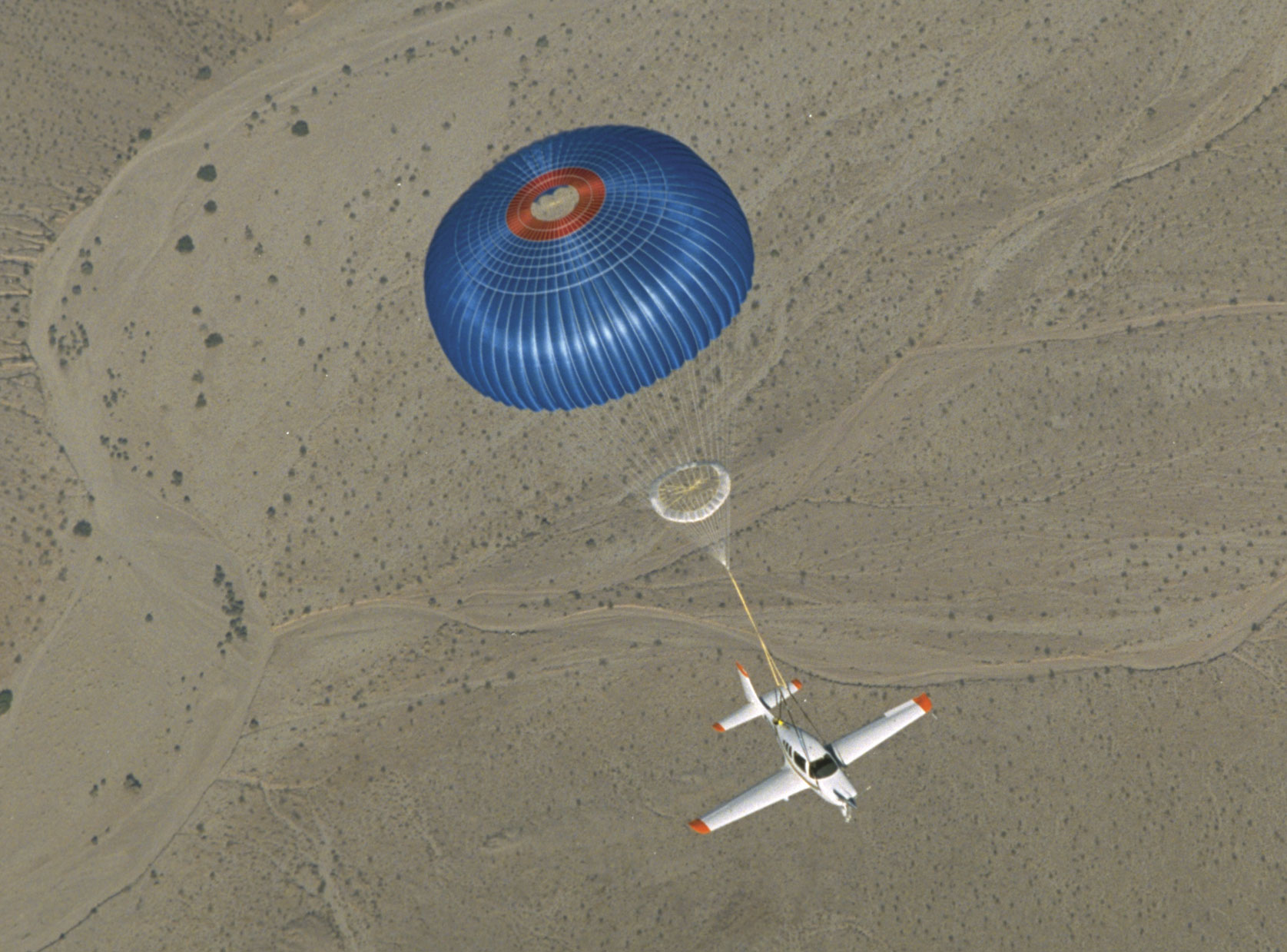
SR20 deploying CAPS during certification flight-testing in 1998

In 2011, the accident records of the SR20 and -22 were the subject of a detailed examination by Aviation Consumer magazine. The review concluded that the series has an overall accident record that is better than average for light aircraft, exceeded only by the Diamond DA40 and DA42. However, its fatal accident rate is much worse at 1.6/100,000 hours, placing it higher than the U.S. general aviation rate of 1.2 and higher than the Diamond DA40 (0.35), Cessna 172 (0.45), Diamond DA42 (0.54), Cessna 182 (0.69), and Cessna 400 (1.0), despite the Cirrus's CAPS.

By 2014, the accident rate had been dramatically reduced, with a 2013 fatal rate of 1.01 per 100,000 flight hours. This was attributed to better training, particularly in when to deploy the ballistic parachute system.

By 2015, the accident rate had continued to decrease, with a 2014 fatal rate of 0.42 per 100,000 flight hours, making it one of the best safety records in the industry. This marked the fewest fatalities in a single year for Cirrus since 2001, and the first year where the number of CAPS deployments (12) exceeded the number of fatal accidents (3).

As of September 2018, the SR-series has had its parachute system deployed 79 times, with 163 survivors.

== Variants ==
SR20
Original version produced from 1999

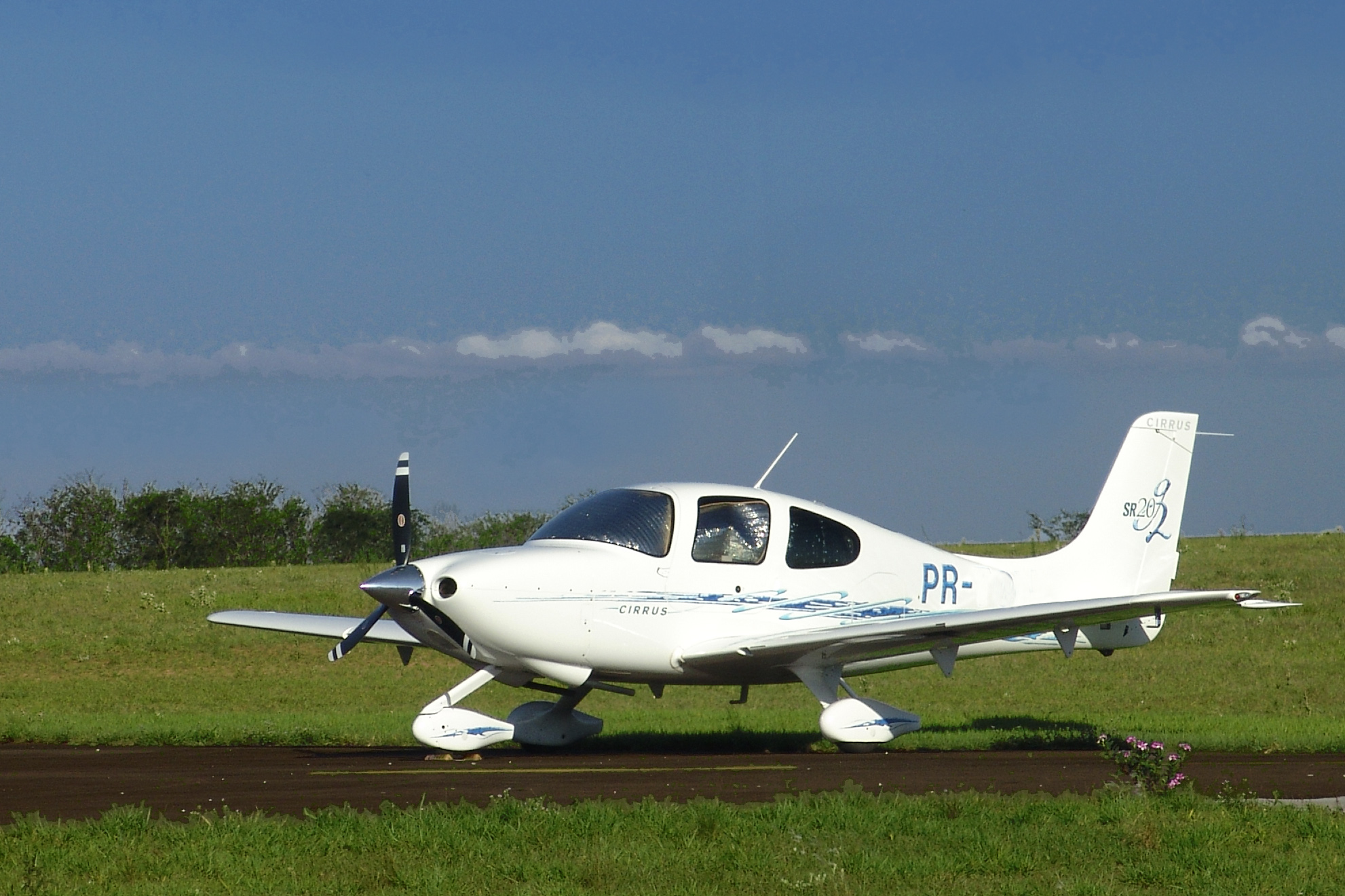
Cirrus SR20 G2

SR20 G2
Improved variant introduced in 2004, including Avidyne Entegra avionics

SRV
Introduced at the 2003 EAA AirVenture Convention and brought to market in 2004, the Cirrus SRV was a VFR-only version of the SR20 for the low-end private ownership and flight-training market. As such, it omitted some standard equipment available on the SR20 such as wheel fairings. For 2008, the SRV model was updated to G3 configuration, with the SR22 wing. Cirrus discontinued the SRV for the 2010 model year.

SR20 G3
Introduced in 2007, the G3 has a lighter wing of greater area, incorporating a carbon-fiber spar. The new wing increased the SR20's cruise speed by 6–7 knots (11–13 km/h). The G3 also added a 50 pounds (23 kg) increased useful load by increasing the take-off weight to 3,050 pounds (1,380 kg), a redesigned main landing gear that is 2 inches (5 cm) taller, giving greater propeller and tail clearance, improved aircraft handling due to increased dihedral, improved aerodynamics including new wing root fairings, LED recognition lights, improved heat and ventilation, dual-redundant GPS WAAS-certified Garmin GNS 430W comm-navigators (that include a VHF radio and a VOR/LOC/ILS receiver), and an S-TEC Autopilot.

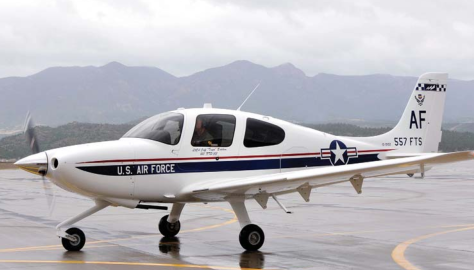
United States Air Force T-53A

T-53A
In 2011, the SR20 was selected for cadet flight training with the 557th Flying Training Squadron at the United States Air Force Academy and given an Air Force model/design/series (MDS) designation as the T-53A. Twenty-five examples were to be purchased to replace the academy's current stock of 20 leased T-52As by May 2012, and included new features such as Cirrus Perspective avionics (by Garmin) as well as airbag seat belts.

SR20 G6
Introduced in January 2017, the G6 model adds a Lycoming IO-390 engine of 215 hp (160 kW), an enhanced "Perspective-Plus" flight deck with a 10-times faster instrument processing speed, new LED wingtip lights and a useful load increase of 150 lb (68 kg).

TRAC20
Introduced in September 2019, the TRAC is a flight-training version with a simplified, more durable interior, IO-390 engine, Perspective+ flight deck, rear seat push-to-talk functionality, and simulated retractable landing gear controls.

SR20 G7
On 11 January 2024, Cirrus announced the G7 of the SR series, including a redesigned interior, Cirrus Perspective Touch+ flight deck with 35% larger instrument touch screens, a contextualized 3D taxi guide, stick shaker functions for the side-yokes to warn of an approaching stall condition, a new flap airspeed protection system, an automatic fuel selection system, a pushbutton engine start interface, an updated automated flight control system (AFCS), and a lower glareshield for better forward visibility, in addition to other improvements to the cockpit. The 2024 base price for the SR20 was $634,900 and the SR20 Premium started at $694,900. Air conditioning was available as a $39,900 option weighing 55 lbs. In May 2025, Cirrus announced the G7+ equipped with its Safe Return emergency autoland system by Garmin.

== Operators ==
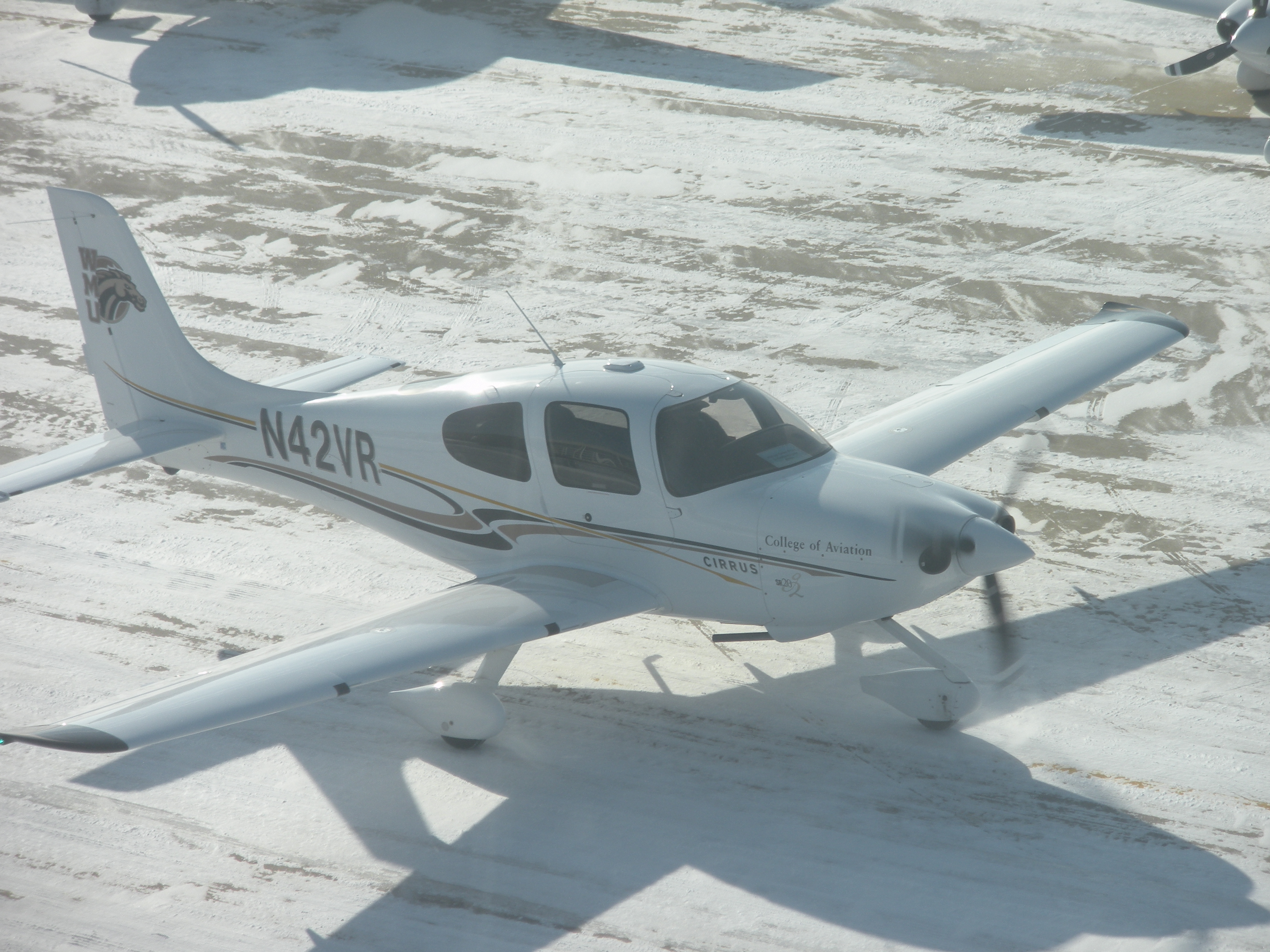
A Cirrus SR20 belonging to Western Michigan University

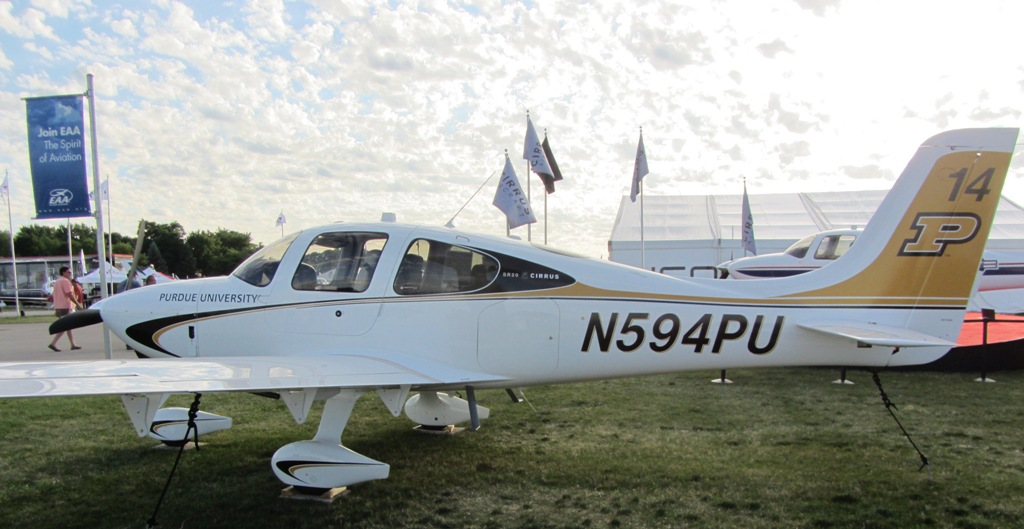
Purdue University Cirrus SR20 on display at the Oshkosh Airshow

=== Civil ===
The SR20 is popular with many flying schools and is operated by private individuals and companies. The largest operators are:

- United Aviate Academy – 66
- Civil Aviation Flight University of China – 40
- Aerosim Flight Academy – 34
- Western Michigan University – 29
- Oklahoma State University – 17
- Aero Atlanta Flight Center – 14
- Texas Southern University – 12
- Southern Utah University – 10
- Lufthansa Flight Training – 9

=== Military ===
United States

- United States Air Force Academy – 25 T-53A aircraft (version of SR20)

France

- French Air and Space Force and Navy Academies (operated by Cassidian) – 23 aircraft (mixed fleet of 16 SR20s and 7 SR22s)

== Accidents and incidents ==
Between 1999 and September 2022, the SR20 was involved in 40 known fatal accidents. Listed below are some of the most notable ones.

- On March 23, 1999, Duluth native Scott D. Anderson was killed in a plane crash while flight-testing the first production model SR20 before it went on sale. Anderson was a pilot, author, engineer, and adventurer who served as chief test pilot at Cirrus in the mid- to late 1990s, performing all the in-flight test deployments of the CAPS. His plane, which had not yet been equipped with CAPS, experienced an aileron jam during experimental stress-testing and went down in a field near the Duluth International Airport. Anderson was posthumously inducted into the Minnesota Aviation Hall of Fame in 2010.
- On October 11, 2006, New York Yankees pitcher Cory Lidle and certified flight instructor Tyler Stanger were killed in the 2006 New York City plane crash when their SR20 crashed into the Belaire Apartments located on the Upper East Side of Manhattan. The aircraft struck the north side of the building, causing a fire in several apartments. The accident resulted from a combination of high winds and pilot error.

== Specifications (SR20-G3) ==
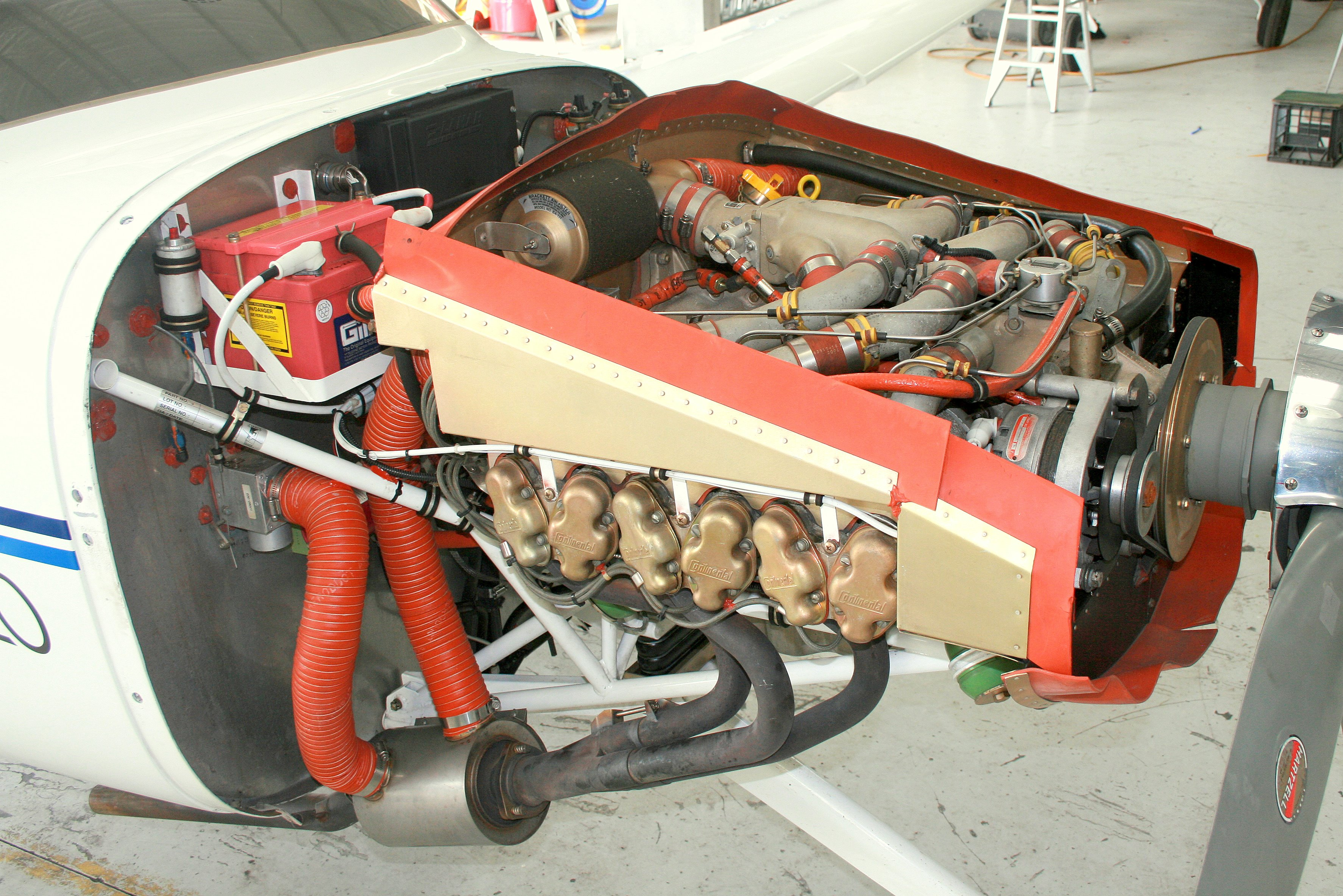
Continental IO-360-ES engine fitted to a Cirrus SR20

Data from Cirrus SR20 Specifications Webpage

General characteristics

- Crew: 1 pilot
- Capacity: 3 passengers (4 using 60/40 flex seating in post-2012 models)
- Length: 26 ft 0 in (7.92 m)
- Wingspan: 38 ft 4 in (11.68 m)
- Height: 8 ft 11 in (2.72 m)
- Empty weight: 2,126 lb (964 kg)
- Gross weight: 3,050 lb (1,383 kg)
- Powerplant: 1 × Continental IO-360-ES six cylinder, horizontally-opposed piston aircraft engine, 200 hp (150 kW)
- Propellers: 3-bladed

Performance

- Cruise speed: 155 kn (178 mph, 287 km/h) TAS
- Stall speed: 56 kn (64 mph, 104 km/h) CAS
- Service ceiling: 17,500 ft (5,300 m)
- Rate of climb: 828 ft/min (4.21 m/s)

Avionics

- Garmin Cirrus Perspective glass cockpit
- GMA 350 All-digital Audio Panel
- Dual WAAS GPS/Comm/Nav Radios
- Garmin GFC700 Autopilot with Electronic Stability and Protection
- Dual attitude and heading reference system
- 406 MHz ELT
- ADS-B transponder
- LEMO REDEL 6-pin push-pull audio connector

== See also ==
- Ballistic Recovery Systems
- Klapmeier brothers

Related development

- Cirrus SR22
- Cirrus Vision SF50

Aircraft of comparable role, configuration, and era

- Diamond DA40
- Lancair Columbia 300
- Tecnam P2010
- Vans RV-10
