= List of most-produced aircraft =

This is a list of the most-produced crewed aircraft types whose numbers exceed or exceeded 5,000. Any and all types of aircraft qualify, including airplanes, airships, balloons, gliders (sailplanes), helicopters, etc.

== Most-produced aircraft ==
Notes

- Unless noted, aircraft are piston-engined monoplanes.
- Role is generally either the original designed role of the aircraft or the role that dominated production, disregarding minor variants. Aircraft may be categorized as "Multirole" if no particular role was dominant.
- Production period column shows overall production date span of all types included in "Numbers produced" column, disregarding production hiatuses and changes in manufacturer, while including close variants and licensed production.
- a pale-green background indicates aircraft still in production.

Name	Civil / Military	Type / role	Propulsion Type / Engine	Number produced	Country of origin	Production period		Notes
Name	Civil / Military	Type / role	Propulsion Type / Engine	Number produced	Country of origin	Start	End	Notes
Cessna 172	C	Utility / trainer	Tractor-propeller	44,000+	United States	1956	present	Also built in France by Reims Aviation.
Ilyushin Il-2	M	Ground-attack	propeller	36,183	Soviet Union	1941	1945	Most-produced military aircraft.
Messerschmitt Bf 109	M	Fighter		34,852	Germany	1936	1958	Most-produced fighter and single-seat aircraft. Also built in Hungary, Romania, Spain, Czechoslovakia and Switzerland.
Piper PA-28 series	C	Utility / trainer	Propellor	32,778+	United States	1960	present	Sold as Cherokee, Cherokee Warrior, Cherokee Pathfinder, Warrior, Archer, Dakota, Cadet, and Pilot.
Cessna 150 / 152	C	Utility / trainer	Propellor	31,471	United States	1958	1986	Most-produced two-seat civil aircraft. Also built in France (both models) and Argentina (150 only). 23,887 150s, 7,584 152s.
Cessna 182	C	Utility	Propellor	23,237+	United States	1956	present	Also built in France.
Supermarine Spitfire/Seafire	M	Fighter		22,685	United Kingdom	1938	1948	20,351 of total were land-based Spitfires. The first Seafires were Spitfires modified with tailhooks.
Piper J-3 Cub	C	Utility / trainer	Propellor	20,191	United States	1938	1947	Most-produced fabric-covered monoplane. Includes military variants such as L-4, O-59, TG-8 and NE. 150 built in Canada.
Focke-Wulf Fw 190	M	Fighter		20,051	Germany	1939	1945	64 produced in post-WWII France as the "NC 900".
Polikarpov Po-2	M	Biplane, multirole		20,000 to 30,000	Soviet Union	1928	1959	Most-produced biplane. Used for training, reconnaissance, liaison, and ground-attack. Also built in Poland.
Beechcraft Bonanza	C	Utility		18,542 (at end of 2023)	United States	1947	present	Longest continuous production run of any airplane in history. Includes Debonair variant; excludes dissimilar Twin Bonanza.
Consolidated B-24 Liberator	M	Heavy bomber		18,482	United States	1940	1945	Most-produced heavy bomber and multi-engine aircraft. Includes 962 built by Douglas, 6,792 by Ford Motor Company and 966 by North American. Does not include related PB4Y-2 Privateer.
Antonov An-2 / An-3	C	Biplane, utility / agricultural		18,000+	Soviet Union	1947	2009	Most-produced transport; longest production run of any transport aircraft. Also built in China and Poland.
Mikoyan-Gurevich MiG-15	M	Jet fighter	Turbojet	18,000+	Soviet Union	1947	1950s	Most-produced jet. Also 3,454 built in Czechoslovakia; 727 in Poland; and an unknown number in China.
Mil Mi-8/Mi-17	M	Helicopter, utility		17,000+	Soviet Union	1961	present	Most-produced helicopter.
Yakovlev Yak-9	M	Fighter		16,769	Soviet Union	1942	1948	
Douglas DC-3	C/M	Airliner / transport		16,079	United States	1935	1952	Designed pre-war as civilian transport. 607 built as civil airliners; 15,472 built as military transports, including the Soviet Lisunov Li-2 and Japanese Nakajima L2D; after World War II, most were converted into civil airliners or freighters.
Bell UH-1 Iroquois	M	Helicopter, utility		16,000+	United States	1959	1987	
Republic P-47 Thunderbolt	M	Fighter		15,660	United States	1942	1945	
North American P-51 Mustang	M	Fighter		15,586	United States	1940	1951	Excluding North American F-82 Twin Mustang and other derivatives.
North American T-6 Texan	M	Trainer		15,495	United States	1937	1950s	Also known as SNJ and Harvard. Also built in Canada.
Junkers Ju 88	M	Multirole		15,183	Germany	1939	1945	Luftwaffe multirole bomber, heavy fighter and reconnaissance aircraft.
Hawker Hurricane	M	Fighter		14,487	United Kingdom	1937	1944	Including production in Canada and a few built in Belgium and Yugoslavia.
Mikoyan-Gurevich MiG-21	M	Jet fighter	Turbojet	13,996	Soviet Union	1959	1985	Most-produced supersonic aircraft. Also built in China, Czechoslovakia and India.
Waco CG-4	M	Glider, military		13,903+	United States	1942	1945	Most-produced glider. Many licensed manufacturers.
Curtiss P-40 Warhawk	M	Fighter		13,738	United States	1939	1944	
Chotia Weedhopper	C	Ultralight		13,000+	United States	1977	2012	Most-produced ultralight.
Airbus A320 family	C	Jet airliner	Turbofan	12,955+	European multinational	1988	present	Most-produced jet-powered civilian aircraft. Consists of the A318, A319, A320 and A321, as well as the A320neo family. Designed and built in France, Germany, Spain and the UK, with additional assembly in China and the U.S.
Boeing 737	C	Jet airliner		12,772+	United States	1967	present	Includes the original, Classic, NG, and MAX models, as well as military variants such as the C-40 and P-8.
Boeing B-17 Flying Fortress	M	Heavy bomber		12,731	United States	1937	1945	3,000 built by Douglas, also produced by Lockheed Vega.
Vought F4U Corsair	M	Fighter		12,571	United States	1941	1952	Most-produced carrier aircraft. Many built as Goodyear FG or Brewster F3A. Longest production run of any U.S. piston-engined fighter.
Grumman F6F Hellcat	M	Fighter		12,275	United States	1942	1945	
Vultee BT-13 Valiant	M	Trainer		11,537	United States	1939	1947	
Vickers Wellington	M	Medium bomber		11,462	United Kingdom	1936	1945	
Petlyakov Pe-2	M	Dive bomber		11,427	Soviet Union	1939	1945	Most-produced dive bomber of any type – a twin-engined design.
Avro 504	M	Biplane, bomber / trainer		11,303	United Kingdom	1913	1940	Most-produced World War I aircraft design. Includes Japanese and Soviet production.
Avro Anson	M	Multirole		11,020	United Kingdom	1935	1952	Also built in Canada.
Mooney M20	C	Utility		11,000+	United States	1955	2019	
Mitsubishi A6M Zero	M	Fighter		10,939	Japan	1940	1945	
Piper Pacer	C	Utility / trainer		10,610	United States	1950	1964	Includes PA-20 Pacer and PA-22 Tri-Pacer and Colt.
Mikoyan-Gurevich MiG-17	M	Jet fighter	Turbojet	10,367	Soviet Union	1951	1986	Also built in Poland and China; many built as the Shenyang J-5 / JJ-5.
Polikarpov I-16	M	Fighter		10,292	Soviet Union	1934	1943	Also manufactured in Spain and China.
Piper PA-18 Super Cub	C	Utility / trainer		10,222	United States	1949	1983	Includes military variants such as L-18 and L-21.
Lockheed P-38 Lightning	M	Fighter		10,037	United States	1941	1945	Two-engined twin-boom design.
Aeronca Champion	C	Utility / trainer		10,000+	United States	1946	2019	Includes military L-16. Several changes in manufacturer.
DFS SG 38 Schulgleiter	M	Glider, trainer		10,000~	Germany	1938	1944	
North American B-25 Mitchell	M	Medium bomber		9,984	United States	1939	1945	
Lavochkin La-5	M	Fighter		9,920	Soviet Union	1942	1944	
North American F-86 Sabre / FJ Fury	M	Jet fighter	Turbojet	9,860	United States	1947	1956	Also built in Australia and Canada.
Grumman TBF Avenger	M	Torpedo bomber		9,836	United States	1941	1945	Includes 7,546 built as TBM Avenger by General Motors.
Bell P-39 Airacobra	M	Fighter		9,584	United States	1938	1944	
Cessna 210	C	Utility		9,240	United States	1957	1986	
Beechcraft Model 18	C	Utility/ Multi-engine trainer		9,000+	United States	1937	1970	Includes military variants such as C-45, AT-7, and SNB.
Cirrus SR22	C	Utility / trainer		8,785+	United States	2001	present	Most-produced aircraft made of composite material; most-produced aircraft with production period starting in the 21st century. Developed from Cirrus SR20.
Airspeed Oxford	M	Trainer		8,751	United Kingdom	1937	1945	Several manufacturers.
Yakovlev Yak-1	M	Fighter		8,734	Soviet Union	1940	1944	
Boeing-Stearman Model 75	M	Biplane, trainer		8,584	United States	1934	1942	
Cessna 206	C	Utility		8,509+	United States	1962	present	Includes models 205 and 207.
SPAD S.XIII	M	Biplane, fighter		8,472	France	1917	1918	Most-produced World War I fighter aircraft design.
Grumman F4F Wildcat	M	Fighter		7,885	United States	1937	1943	Includes about 5,600 built as FM Wildcat by General Motors.
Piper PA-32	C	Utility		7,842+	United States	1965	2007	Enlarged PA-28 sold as Cherokee Six and Saratoga.
Breguet 14	M	Biplane, reconnaissance, medium bomber		7,800	France	1916	1928	2,300 built after WWI.
de Havilland Mosquito	M	Multirole		7,781	United Kingdom	1940	1950	Also built in Australia and Canada.
Fairchild PT-19	M	Trainer		7,700+	United States	1938	1948	Includes variants PT-23 and PT-26. Also built in Canada and Brazil.
Cessna 120 and 140	C	Utility / trainer		7,664	United States	1946	1950	Developed into Cessna 150.
Republic F-84 Thunderjet	M	Jet fighter-bomber	Turbojet	7,524	United States	1946	1953	Excludes swept-wing F-84F / RF-84F derivatives.
Douglas DB-7 (A-20 Havoc)	M	Multirole		7,478	United States	1938	1944	Includes 380 built by Boeing.
Avro Lancaster	M	Heavy bomber		7,377	United Kingdom	1942	1945	Includes 430 built under licence in Canada.
Bell 206 JetRanger	C	Helicopter, utility / trainer		7,340+	United States	1966	2017	Also made in Canada and Italy.
Heinkel He 111	M	Medium bomber		7,300	Germany	1935	1944	Also built in Spain as the CASA C.2111.
Yakovlev UT-2	M	Trainer		7,243	Soviet Union	1936	1944	
Curtiss SB2C Helldiver	M	Dive bomber		7,140	United States	1940	1945	900 built as A-25; 1,194 built in Canada. Most-produced single-engine dive bomber.
de Havilland Tiger Moth	C	Biplane, trainer		7,105	United Kingdom	1931	1944	Also built in Canada, Australia and New Zealand.
Beechcraft Baron	C	Utility / Multi-engine trainer		7,004+ (at end of 2023)	United States	1961	present	Includes 55, 56, 58, and T-42A; excludes related Travel Air.
Eurocopter AS350	C	Utility helicopter		7,000+	France	1975	present	
Polikarpov R-5	M	Biplane, Reconnaissance / bomber		7,000	Soviet Union	1928	1937	
Piper PA-23	C	Utility / Multi-engine trainer		6,976	United States	1952	1981	Sold as Apache and Aztec.
Robinson R44	C	Helicopter, utility / trainer		6,866+	United States	1993	present	Most-produced reciprocating engine helicopter. Developed from Robinson R22.
Curtiss JN-4	M	Biplane, trainer		6,813	United States	1915	1927	
Polikarpov I-15	M	Biplane, fighter		6,750	Soviet Union	1933	1940	Also built in Spain.
Tupolev SB	M	Bomber		6,656	Soviet Union	1936	1941	Also built in Czechoslovakia.
Ilyushin Il-28	M	Medium bomber		6,635+	Soviet Union	1949	1955	Also built in China and Czechoslovakia.
Yakovlev Yak-18	M	Trainer		6,630+	Soviet Union	1946	1960s	Also produced in Hungary and China. Production claims vary from 6,168 including 125 Yak-18P and 25 -18PM to 6,630 excluding P and PM. Both exclude unrelated Yak-18T.
Lockheed T-33 Shooting Star	M	Jet trainer	Turbojet	6,557	United States	1948	1959	Also built in Canada by Canadair.
Yakovlev Yak-7	M	Fighter / trainer		6,399	Soviet Union	1940	1943	
Airco DH.4	M	Biplane, Bomber		6,295	United Kingdom	1916	1926	1,449 in the UK and 4,846 (as the DH-4) in the US.
Lavochkin-Gorbunov-Gudkov LaGG-3	M	Fighter		6,258	Soviet Union	1941	1942	
Ilyushin Il-10	M	Ground-attack		6,226	Soviet Union	1944	1954	Also built in Czechoslovakia as the Avia B-33 / CB-33.
Cessna 180	C	Utility		6,193	United States	1953	1981	Developed into Cessna 182.
Handley Page Halifax	M	Heavy bomber		6,176	United Kingdom	1940	1946	
Messerschmitt Bf 110	M	Heavy / night fighter		6,150	Germany	1936	1945	Twin-engined design. Most sources state 6,000 to 6,150 produced.
Junkers Ju 87	M	Dive bomber		6,000	Germany	1935	1944	
Sopwith 1½ Strutter	M	Biplane, multirole		5,939	United Kingdom	1917	1918	Majority built in France for French use.
Douglas SBD Dauntless	M	Dive bomber / scout		5,938	United States	1940	1944	Includes A-24 Banshee variant.
Bristol Beaufighter	M	Heavy fighter		5,928	United Kingdom	1940	1946	Also built in Australia.
Nakajima Ki-43	M	Fighter		5,919	Japan	1942	1945	
Yokosuka K5Y	M	Biplane, trainer		5,770	Japan	1934	1945	
Lavochkin La-7	M	Fighter		5,753	Soviet Union	1944	1946	
Cessna 310	C	Utility / Multi-engine trainer		5,737	United States	1954	1980	
Antonov A-1	M	Glider, trainer		5,700	Soviet Union	1930	1940s	
ERCO Ercoupe	C	Utility / trainer		5,685	United States	1940	1969	First civil aircraft with a nose wheel landing gear. Several changes in manufacturer.
Bell 47	C	Helicopter		5,600	United States	1946	1974	Produced under license by Agusta in Italy, Kawasaki Heavy Industries in Japan, and Westland Aircraft in the United Kingdom.
Mikoyan-Gurevich MiG-19	M	Jet fighter	Turbojet	5,500	Soviet Union	1954	1968	World's first mass-produced supersonic aircraft. 2,500 built in Soviet Union. Also built in China (~3,000) and Czechoslovakia.
Sopwith Camel	M	Biplane, fighter		5,497	United Kingdom	1917	1918	
Mil Mi-2	M	Helicopter, utility		5,497	Soviet Union	1965	1985	Built in Poland.
Cessna AT-17 Bobcat	C/M	Utility / Multi-engine trainer		5,422	United States	1939	1944	Includes civil T-50 and military variants such as UC-78, JRC, and Crane.
Bristol F.2 Fighter	M	Biplane, fighter		5,329	United Kingdom	1916	1927	
Martin B-26 Marauder	M	Medium bomber		5,288	United States	1941	1945	Not to be confused with unrelated Douglas B-26.
Stinson 108	C	Utility / trainer		5,260	United States	1946	1950	
Ilyushin Il-4	M	Medium bomber		5,256	Soviet Union	1942	1944	
Royal Aircraft Factory S.E.5	M	Biplane, fighter		5,205	United Kingdom	1917	1918	
McDonnell Douglas F-4 Phantom II	M	Jet fighter-bomber	Turbojet	5,195	United States	1958	1981	Includes 127 built in Japan by Mitsubishi.
Cessna 170	C	Utility / trainer		5,174	United States	1948	1956	Developed into Cessna 172.
Mikoyan-Gurevich MiG-23	M	Jet fighter	Turbojet	5,047	Soviet Union	1967	1985	Most-produced variable-sweep aircraft.
Piper PA-34 Seneca	C	Utility / Multi-engine trainer		5,037	United States	1971	2019	Also built in Poland and Brazil (PZL-Mielec M-20 Mewa and EMB-810).
Yakovlev Yak-12	M	Multirole STOL		5,000+	Soviet Union	1946	2010	Also built in Poland and China (Chinese-produced name is Shenyang Type 5; production figure unknown?).
Grunau Baby IIb	C	Sailplane		5,000+	Germany	1932	1945	
Sikorsky UH-60 Black Hawk	M	Military helicopter		5,000+	United States	1978	present	S-70 family: UH-60A (1978–1989), UH-60L (1989–2007), UH-60M (2005–), SH-60 Seahawk (1979–), in Japan as Mitsubishi H-60 (1987–).

== See also ==
- List of commercial jet airliners
- List of most-produced rotorcraft
- List of best selling cars
