= University of Connecticut School of Business =

Public business school in Storrs, Connecticut

Coordinates: 41.8061°N 72.2516°W

- Type: Public
- Established: 1941
- Parent institution: University of Connecticut
- Dean: Greg Reilly (Interim)
- Location: Storrs, Mansfield, Connecticut, United States
- Parent Endowment: $634 million (2024)
- Website: business.uconn.edu

The University of Connecticut (UConn) School of Business is the University of Connecticut's graduate and undergraduate public business school. It spans across four campuses, with the main campus located in Storrs, Connecticut.

The UConn School of Business was founded in 1941 and offers academic programs at the bachelor, MBA, Executive MBA, doctorate and advanced certificate levels.

== Campuses ==
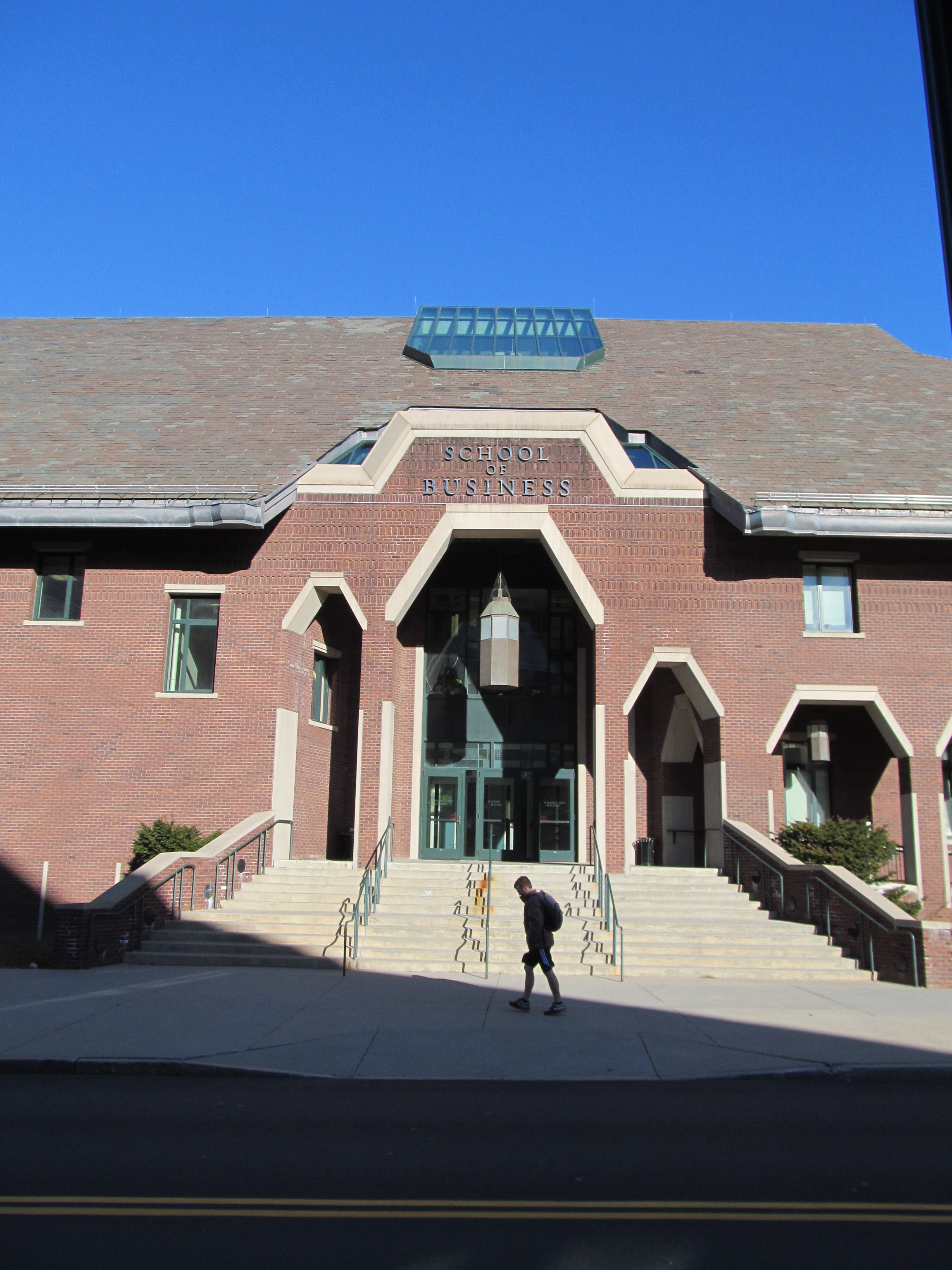
School of Business in Storrs

=== Storrs ===
The main campus in Storrs is home to the business school's primary administrative functions, outreach initiatives, undergraduate and Ph.D. programs, as well as the graduate programs in accounting and human resource management. Students study in a $27 million research and learning facility located in the campus near the Student Union, Barnes & Noble Bookstore, Gampel Pavilion and the Homer Babbidge Library. Built in early 2000, the four-story, 100,000-square-foot facility, houses the School's five academic departments (accounting, finance, management, marketing, and operations and information management), as well as faculty, staff, classes, and a lounge.

=== Hartford ===
The University of Connecticut Graduate Business Learning Center (GBLC) and the UConn Hartford Campus at the Hartford Times Building are located in downtown Hartford.

UConn Graduate Business Learning Center (GBLC)

Located at 100 Constitution Plaza, the GBLC serves as the dedicated center for business education, hands-on learning, and executive collaboration. Designed for working professionals and full-time learners, the facility features modern classrooms, administrative offices, and high-tech conference spaces. It also houses top experiential learning hubs, including:

The Student Managed Fund

The SS&C Technologies Financial Accelerator

SCOPE (Supply Chain Operations and Planning Execution)

UConn Hartford Campus (Hartford Times Building)

Just blocks away at 10 Prospect Street, the historic Hartford Times Building serves as the flagship centerpiece of the broader UConn Hartford campus. First constructed in 1920 in a stunning Beaux-Arts architectural style, the restored 179,000-square-foot facility re-opened in 2017 as a modern, LEED Gold-certified academic complex. It features a three-story glass atrium, state-of-the-art teaching labs, student lounges, and vibrant public spaces that connect students directly with Hartford’s corporate, civic, and cultural institutions.

MBA Programs UConn delivers flexible, top-ranked MBA pathways designed for working professionals and full-time learners:

Online MBA – Top-ranked program offering 100% online flexibility.

Flex MBA – A customizable hybrid format blending in-person learning at the GBLC and online study.

One-Year MBA – An accelerated program designed for fast-track career advancement.

Specialized Master’s Programs Industry-aligned Master of Science degrees that build deep technical and strategic expertise:

Graduate Programs in Accounting

Graduate Programs in Business Analytics & Project Management (BAPM)

Graduate Programs in Finance

Graduate Programs in Human Resource Management

Graduate Programs in Social Responsibility & Impact in Business

Graduate Programs in Supply Chain Management

Undergraduate & Accelerated Options

Undergraduate Business Programs – World-class foundational degrees across core business disciplines, backed by UConn's elite business faculty.

Accelerated Master’s Degree Programs – Streamlined pathways allowing high-achieving undergraduate students to fast-track their graduate education..

=== Waterbury ===
With an enrollment of approximately 1,000 students, UConn's Waterbury campus offers the four-year bachelor's degree program with majors in business administration and business data analytics.

=== Stamford ===
UConn's campus in downtown Stamford provides internships, field placements and jobs with companies and non-profit organizations headquartered in Fairfield county.

=== Online ===
UConn's School of Business offers a number of programs fully online, including the online Master of Business Administration (OMBA), a Graduate Programs in Human Resource Management, Graduate Programs in Social Responsibility & Impact in Business, Graduate Programs in Supply Chain Management, and the Graduate Programs in Science in Accounting (MSA).

== Academics ==
=== Academic Areas ===
The UConn School of Business offers programs in a variety of functional disciplines — Accounting, Finance, Management, Marketing, and Operations and Information Management. The School of Business also offers interdisciplinary centers in economics, entrepreneurship and innovation, international business, and real estate, as well as programs in health care management and insurance studies.

==== Accounting ====
The department was the first accounting program in New England to receive separate national accreditation by AACSB International. The department offers Bachelors, Masters, and a Ph.D. The Masters of Science in Accounting has been 100% online since 2003 and is consistently ranked among the top online non-MBA masters programs in the country. The accounting department faculty includes a recipient of the American Accounting Association Notable Contributions to Accounting Literature Award and two recipients of the American Accounting Association/Deloitte Foundation Wildman Award.

==== Finance ====
The Department of Finance provides education in a range of finance-related fields such as: corporate or business finance, financial management in government and not-for-profit organizations, financial planning, investments, banking, insurance, real estate, public accounting, and health systems.

==== Marketing ====
The Marketing Department at the University of Connecticut consists of faculty in marketing and business law.

==== Operations and Information Management ====
The Department of Operations and Information Management (OPIM) at the University of Connecticut offers undergraduate majors in Management Information Systems and in Management and Engineering for Manufacturing.

== Accreditation and rankings ==
The UConn School of Business has been accredited by AACSB International since 1958.

=== Rankings ===
In the 2024–2025 U.S. News & World Report rankings, the school's part-time MBA program was ranked 33rd in the nation and the best public part-time MBA in New England. The online MBA program was ranked 33rd nationally by Poets & Quants in 2025. Fortune magazine ranked the school's online MBA as the best in Connecticut and its Executive MBA as 20th in the nation in 2024.

For entrepreneurship, The Princeton Review ranked the graduate program 5th and the undergraduate program 6th in the Northeast for 2024.

=== Admissions ===
Admissions to the school is selective. For the fall 2024 incoming undergraduate class, the acceptance rate was approximately 49%. The MBA program reported an acceptance rate of roughly 40% to 50% for recent classes.

== Research Centers ==
Research centers are an integral part of the UConn School of Business, supporting teaching, advancing scholarship and innovation, and providing a professional forum for exchange between faculty, students and the corporate community.

As one of 17 Centers for International Business Education & Research located in universities throughout the U.S., the UConn CIBER is mandated to increase the competitiveness of U.S. business in the global marketplace. The UConn School of Business first received the CIBER grant from the Department of Education in 1995 as part of the Higher Education Act.

The Connecticut Center for Economic Analysis (CCEA), is a University Center located within the School of Business at the University of Connecticut (UConn). CCEA specializes in economic impact and policy analysis studies, as well as advising clients regarding business strategy, market analysis, and related topics.

The Center for Real Estate and Urban Economic Studies provides services to Connecticut's real estate professionals and to the Department of Consumer Protection.

== Notable alumni ==
- Shari Cantor – Mayor, West Hartford Connecticut
- Joanne Crevoiserat – CEO, Tapestry Inc. (parent company of Coach, Kate Spade, & Stuart Weitzman)
- Rick Deurloo – President, Commercial Engines Division, Pratt & Whitey
- Greg Lewis – Retired Senior Vice President and CFO, Honeywell
- William S. Simon, Jr. – Retired Executive Vice President and COO, Wal-Mart Stores, Inc., CEO, Walmart US
- Daniel Toscano – Managing Director, Morgan Stanley

== See also ==
- List of United States business school rankings
- List of business schools in the United States
