= Fly Aeolus =

Belgian limited liability partnership (BV)

- Fly Aeolus logo
- Industry: Aviation
- Founded: 2009; 16 years ago
- Founders: Stefaan Ghijs; Vincent Wigmans
- Headquarters: Antwerp, Belgium
- Area served: Western Europe
- Services: Air taxi Aircraft rental service
- Website: flyaeolus.com

Fly Aeolus is a Belgian limited liability partnership (BV) which offers private jet flights in the form of an air taxi under a fractional ownership model. The company was founded in 2009 in the city of Antwerp, where it still has its headquarters. Other office locations are located in Rotterdam and Berlin. Fly Aeolus is the largest Cirrus SR-22 operator in Europe and flies on-demand to a total of 1,600 airports and airfields on the continent. Among them, Fly Aeolus has aircraft bases in Lyon, Semur-en-Auxois (France), Essen, Kulmbach, Schönhagen, Husum and Strausberg (Germany).

== History ==
Fly Aeolus was founded in 2009 by Stefaan Ghijs and Vincent Wigmans. Ghijs discovered low-cost private jet flying in the form of an air taxi as a niche market during his master's degree in aerospace engineering. Wigmans previously worked in a private jet maintenance company. It was only in 2009 that their partnership as such was officially established.

The first flight of the service provider Fly Aeolus took place two years later from Antwerp, Belgium to Vichy in France. Following this success, the company continued to develop. The aircraft fleet was expanded to other countries such as Germany, France and the Netherlands. The initial west-northern European area of operations was extended to the entire continent. Since 2015 Fly Aeolus operates in cooperation with the Belgian air taxi company SkyCab.

== Business Model ==
The model of an air taxi resembles the taxi industry but in the area of private aviation. The service is based on a fractional ownership model. Hence customers are joint owners of the Cirrus fleet. The actual private owners, on the other hand, make their aircraft available and receive a commission for every hour flown.

Fly Aeolus' aircraft and commercially qualified pilots are distributed in the north-west of Europe. The use of the Cirrus SR-22 aircraft enables landing on small airfields. The concept of Fly Aeolus B.V. aims thereby to save the costs and save time for the traveller. Fly Aeolus offers also jet card membership programs which allow their members to pay an average 5-10% less for flights than the retail rate for non-members.

In 2019, Fly Aeolus launched an aircraft sales and acquisition division next to its existing air taxi service: Fly Aeolus Aircraft Sales and Acquisitions.

== Fleet ==
Considered by the COPA (Cirrus Owners & Pilots Association) and AOPA (Aircraft Owners & Pilots Association) as one of the safest single engine aircraft in general aviation thanks to the use of CAPS (Cirrus Airframe Parachute System), Fly Aeolus has a standardised fleet of Cirrus SR-22 aircraft. Including the pilot, 4 passengers can be transported in the single piston aircraft. With 15 Cirrus SR-22 aircraft in operation, Fly Aeolus is the largest Cirrus provider in Europe.
