= Cirrus SR22 =

Single-engine general aviation aircraft

SR22
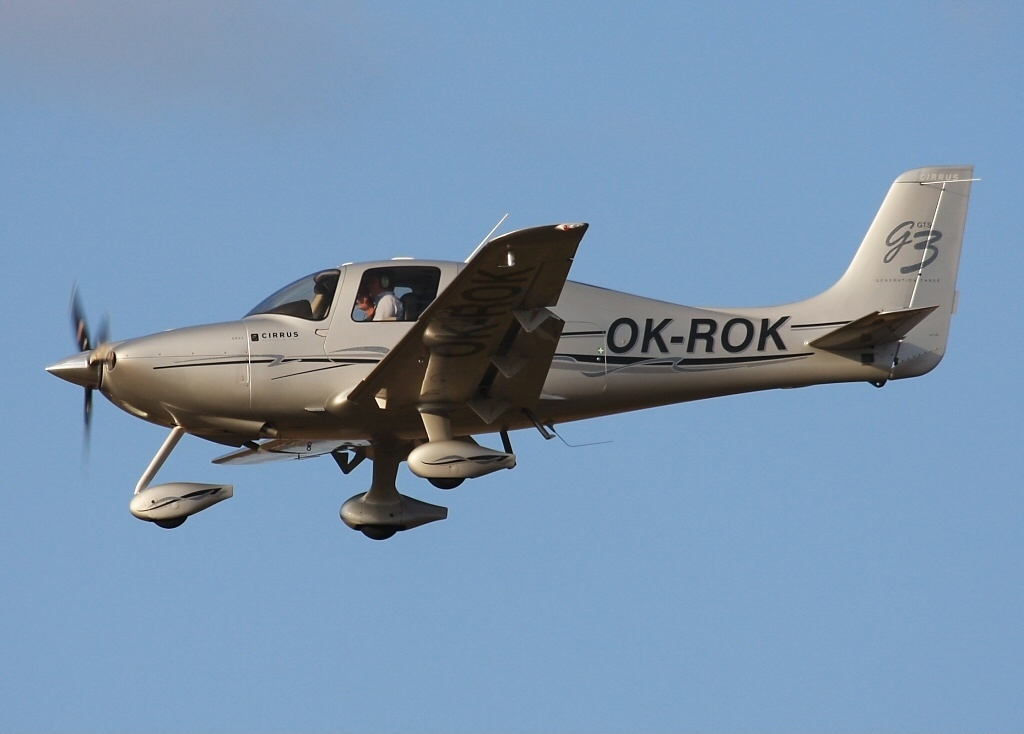
- Cirrus SR22 G3

General information
- Type: Civil utility aircraft
- National origin: United States
- Manufacturer: Cirrus Aircraft
- Number built: 8,785 through 2025

History
- Manufactured: 2001–present
- Developed from: Cirrus SR20

The Cirrus SR22 is a single-engine four- or five-seat composite aircraft built since 2001 by Cirrus Aircraft of Duluth, Minnesota, United States.

It is a development of the Cirrus SR20, with a larger wing, higher fuel capacity and more powerful, 310-horsepower (231 kW) engine, and a 315 hp (235 kW) engine for the turbocharged version of the aircraft. In the general aviation (GA) industry, it became the first light aircraft with a full glass cockpit.

The SR22 series has been the world's best-selling GA airplane every year since 2003. With 8,246 units delivered from 2001 to 2024, and in combination with the SR20, a total of 10,178, it is the most-produced GA aircraft of the 21st century, and is the single most-produced aircraft made from composite material, accounting for nearly 50% of the entire piston aircraft market.

The Cirrus SR22 has a whole-plane emergency recovery parachute system, the Cirrus Airframe Parachute System (CAPS). This has contributed to its market success and has given it the nickname "the plane with the parachute".

== Design and development ==
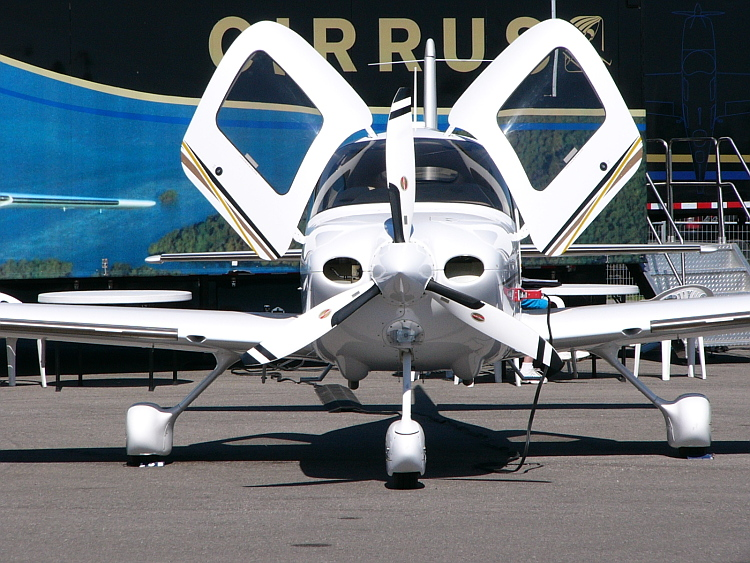
2004 Cirrus SR22 G2 front view, showing how the doors open

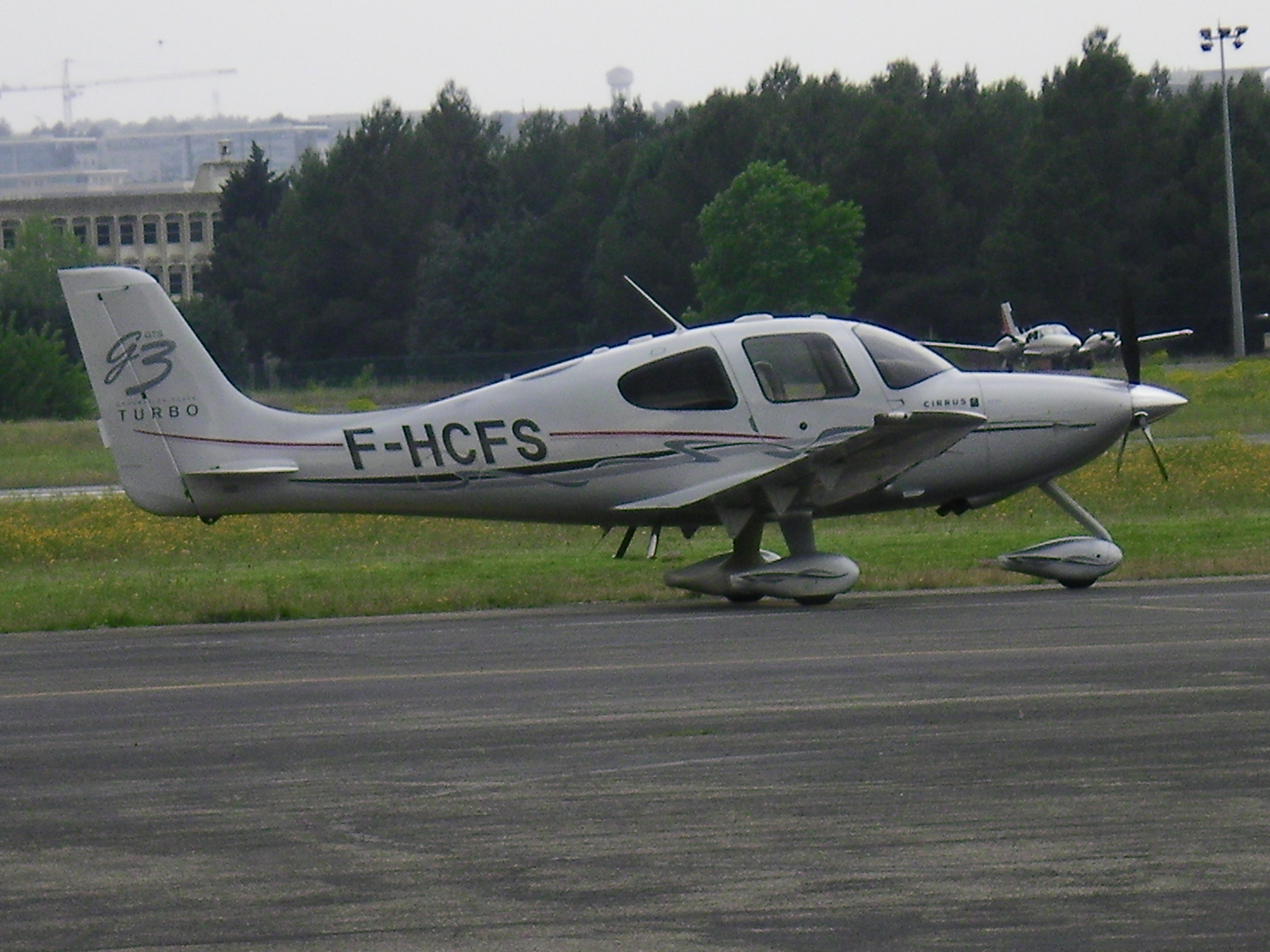
2007 Cirrus SR22-G3 Turbo

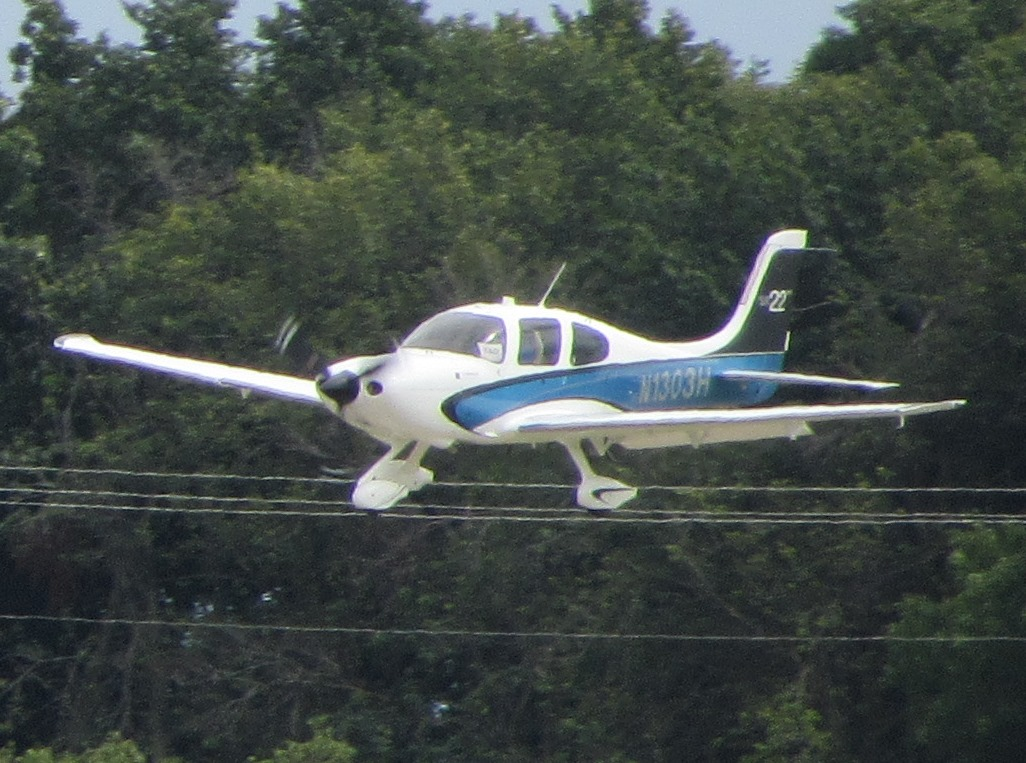
2013-built Cirrus SR22 G5

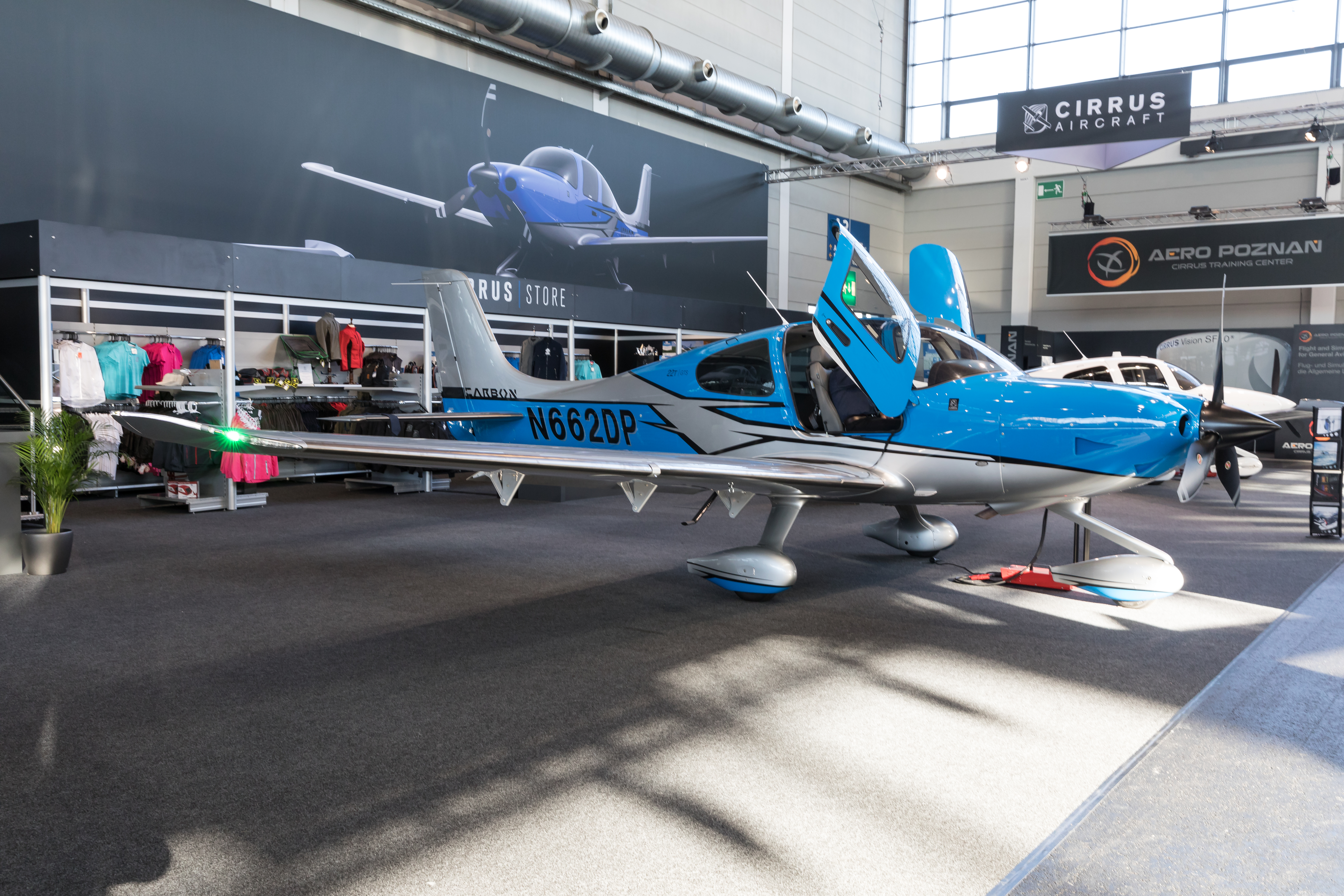
2017 Cirrus SR22 G6

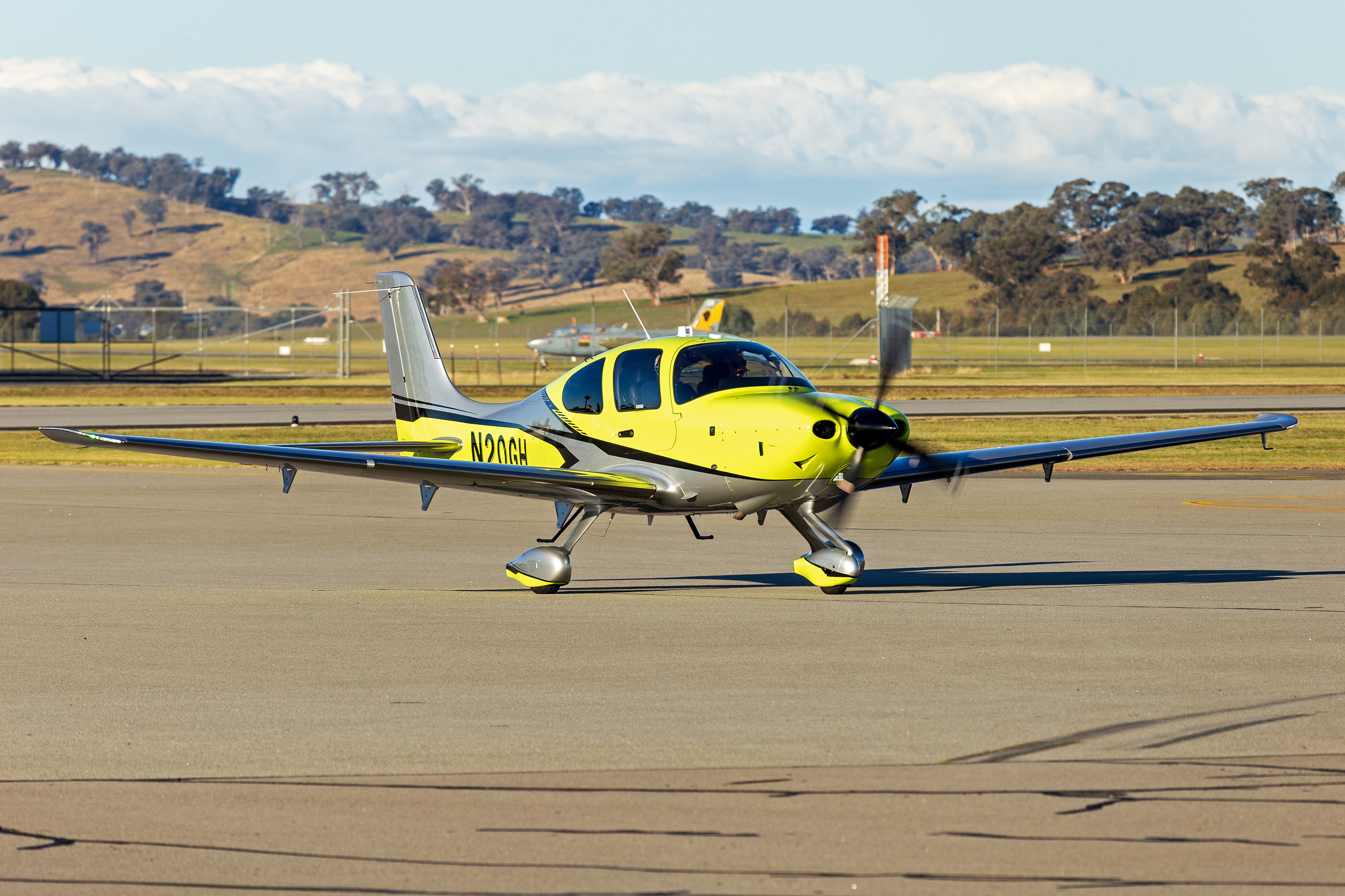
2024 Cirrus SR22T G7

The SR22, certified in November 2000, is a more powerful version of the earlier SR20. Production of the aircraft started in 2001. The SR22 is a low-wing cantilever monoplane of composite construction, featuring fixed (non-retractable) tricycle landing gear with a castering nose wheel and steering via differential braking on the main wheels. It is powered by a nose-mounted 310 hp (231 kW) Continental IO-550-N piston engine. The four-seat cabin is accessed through doors on both sides of the fuselage.

The SR-series remains the only production airplane in its class to include side stick flight controls that combine aspects of a traditional yoke handle (referred to in the industry as a "side yoke").

The Cirrus SR22, like the SR20, is equipped with the Cirrus Airframe Parachute System (CAPS), which can lower the entire aircraft to the ground relatively gently in an emergency.

In 2004, the company introduced the SR22 G2 (Generation 2), and in 2007 the SR22 G3 (Generation 3). Both were defined by airframe modifications, G2 by fuselage, and G3 by modified wing and landing gear.

A 2012 Flying magazine review stated that the Cirrus SR22 "is the most sophisticated single-engine civilian airplane ever built and by a long shot."

In 2013, the manufacturer introduced the SR22 G5 (Generation 5) (there was no G4). Key changes were an increase in gross weight to 3,600 lb (1,633 kg) and a standard five-seat cabin arrangement. The G5 received only minor changes for 2014, including integrated LED lighting and Beringer brakes.

In 2014, the SR22 and SR22T had been the best-selling four- to five-seat fixed-wing aircraft in the world for 12 years in a row.

In 2016, Cirrus introduced improvements to the SR Series, including Bluetooth wireless connectivity, remote keyless entry, a convenience lighting system, and an easy-access door latch.

In 2017, the company introduced the SR22 G6 (Generation 6), with several major upgrades to the avionics and new navigation lighting.

In September 2019, Cirrus unveiled the TRAC, a training-oriented version of the SR-series with a simplified interior, more durable seat material, backseat radio transmit switch to allow an observer to communicate with air traffic control, integrated engine indication and crew alerting/warning systems, and simulated retractable landing gear controls and position lights to allow cadets and instructors to feign landing gear operation and failures during instructional flights (the actual landing gear remains permanently fixed).

In January 2020, the company introduced a new mobile app for the SR Series, called "Cirrus IQ", which enables remote aircraft communication including access to pre-flight status information like fuel and oxygen levels, battery voltage, oil temperature, aircraft location and flight hours.

In October 2020, it was revealed that a 2003 SR22 would be displayed in the new "Thomas W. Haas We All Fly" general aviation exhibition in the Smithsonian Institution's National Air and Space Museum, which officially opened in 2022.

In January 2022, Cirrus announced speed and aesthetic improvements to the G6 SR-series, with a 9-knot (17 km/h) increased cruise speed, upgrades to the mobile IQ app, USB-A and USB-C charging ports, and more.

In January 2024, the company announced the SR22 G7 (Generation 7), with a major overhaul to the interior and avionics, making it more comparable to the cockpit of a Cirrus Vision Jet, as well as safety and engine-start improvements and an automatic fuel selection system. Cirrus introduced the G7+ in May 2025, which added its Safe Return emergency autoland system as the first piston aircraft with autoland, and in December of that year announced the completion of its 11,000^{th} SR-series aircraft since production began.

=== Turbocharged models ===
Cirrus introduced the SR22 Turbo in 2006, with a Tornado Alley turbonormalizing upgrade kit that is factory installed under a Supplemental Type Certificate. It included twin turbonormalizers and twin intercoolers. The conversion includes built-in oxygen and a Hartzell three-blade (later four-blade as optional) lightweight composite propeller. The weight of the conversion reduces the SR22's useful load. Air conditioning is available with the SR22 Turbo, but this further reduces the useful load. The turbo version has a certified ceiling of 25,000 feet (7,600 m), a maximum cruise speed of 211 knots (391 km/h), and a top speed of 219 knots (406 km/h).

In 2010, Cirrus introduced the SR22T. This used a new engine, the Continental TSIO-550K, which produces 315 hp (235 kW) with a 7.5:1 compression ratio and can run on 94 octane fuel.

=== Glass cockpit ===
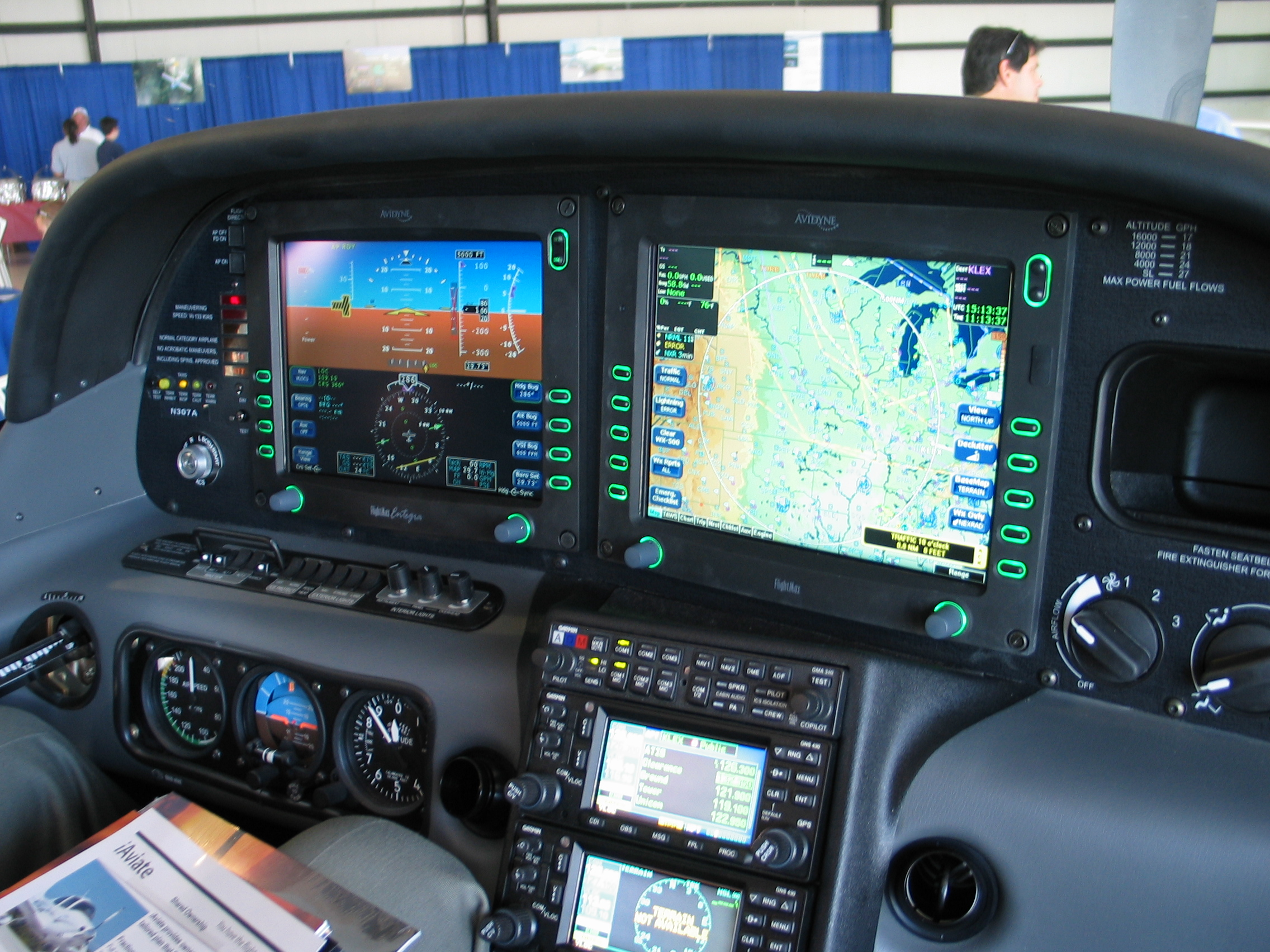
2003–2008 era Cirrus instrument panel with Avidyne Entegra avionics

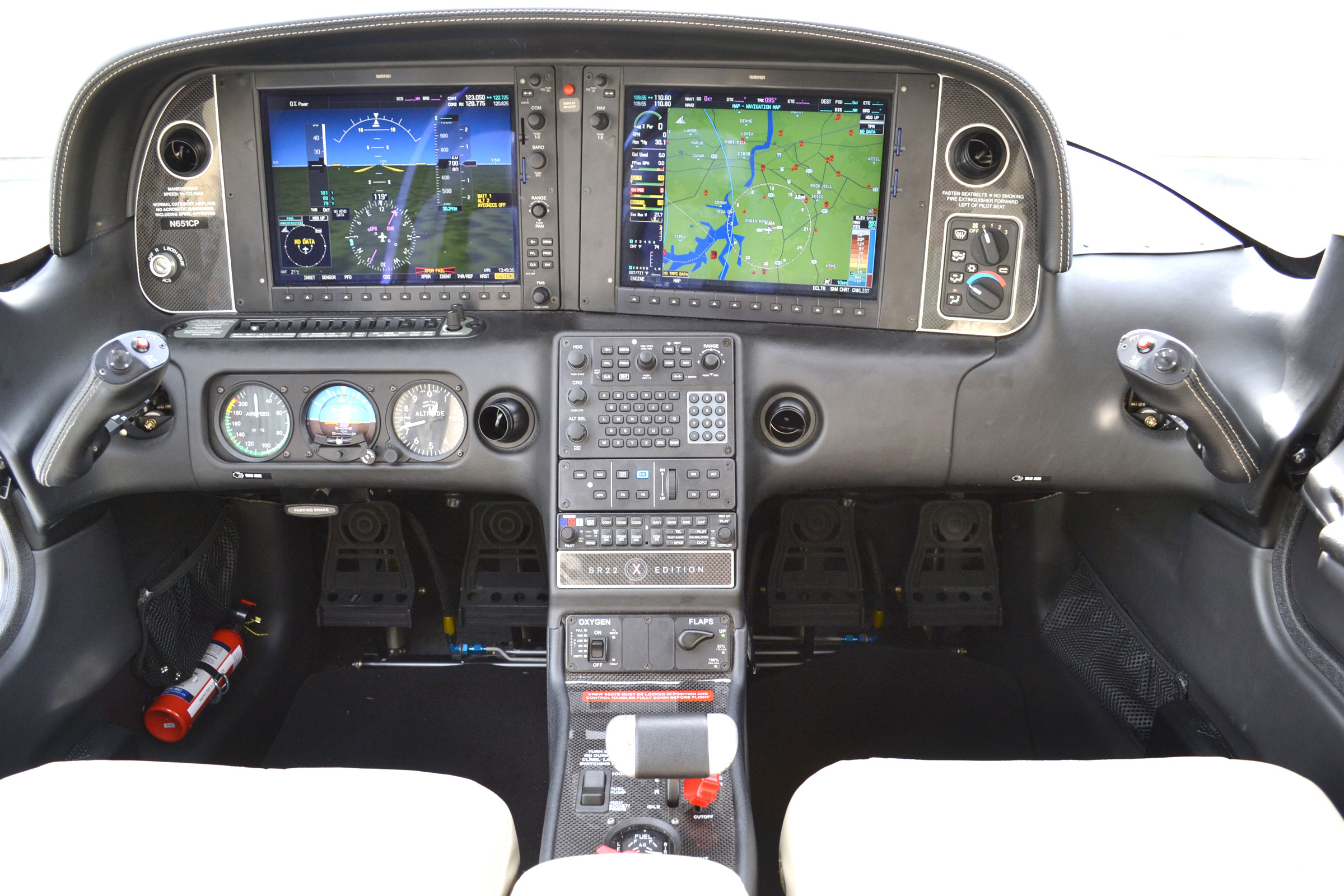
2008–2017 era panel with Cirrus Perspective avionics by Garmin

SR22s and SR20s built before 2003 were equipped with traditional analog instruments and a 10" (later 12") Multi-function display (MFD). In February 2003, Cirrus began offering SR22s with the Avidyne Entegra primary flight display (PFD), making the plane the first of its kind to come with a glass cockpit. Later that year, this instrumentation became standard equipment on all SR-series aircraft and sparked a major transition in general aviation, whereby over 90% of all new light aircraft by the year 2006 were equipped with glass cockpits. Retrofits are available for the older SR aircraft that replace the analog instrument panels with one that includes a PFD, a new MFD and the installation of back-up mechanical instruments.

On 22 May 2008, Cirrus revealed the "Cirrus Perspective" glass cockpit (by Garmin). Both cockpits were available for several months (the Avidyne cockpit was initially standard equipment) and after 2008 the SR22 was sold with only the Perspective panel.

In 2009, the third-generation Cirrus SR22 GTS came equipped with a new enhanced vision system (EVS), a sophisticated dual-wavelength instrument that offers both infrared and synthetic vision.

At the 2010 EAA AirVenture, Cirrus announced its plans to certify Garmin's ESP system (Electronic Stability and Protection, similar to ESPs in automobiles) on the Cirrus SR22. It included advanced flight envelope protection that could stabilize the aircraft with the push of a button, to avoid spiral from developing.

The Cirrus Perspective-Plus avionics flight deck was introduced in 2017, with a faster processing speed, animated datalink weather, payload management, visual approach capabilities, wireless database uploads, glass back-up instruments, and more.

In 2020, the Perspective-Plus flight deck included a new stabilized approach advisory system that provides alerts to the pilot of unstable conditions during approach.

In 2024, the seventh generation of the SR22 introduced the Cirrus Perspective Touch+ flight deck, the "first-ever piston aircraft to incorporate dual Garmin Touch Controllers", including taxiway routing and a contextualized 3D taxi guide, improved flight envelope protection, a 35% larger MFD and PFD, a calibrated airspeed-linked checklist scroll wheel, and other upgrades to the instrument panel. In 2025, Cirrus added its "Safe Return" emergency autoland system to the flight deck.

=== Flight into known icing ===
Cirrus completed testing for flight into known icing conditions (FIKI) on 12 January 2009. The equipment change involved installing a larger fluid tank for the TKS Ice Protection System and protecting more areas of the aircraft. The FAA approved the new installation in April 2009.

== Operational history ==
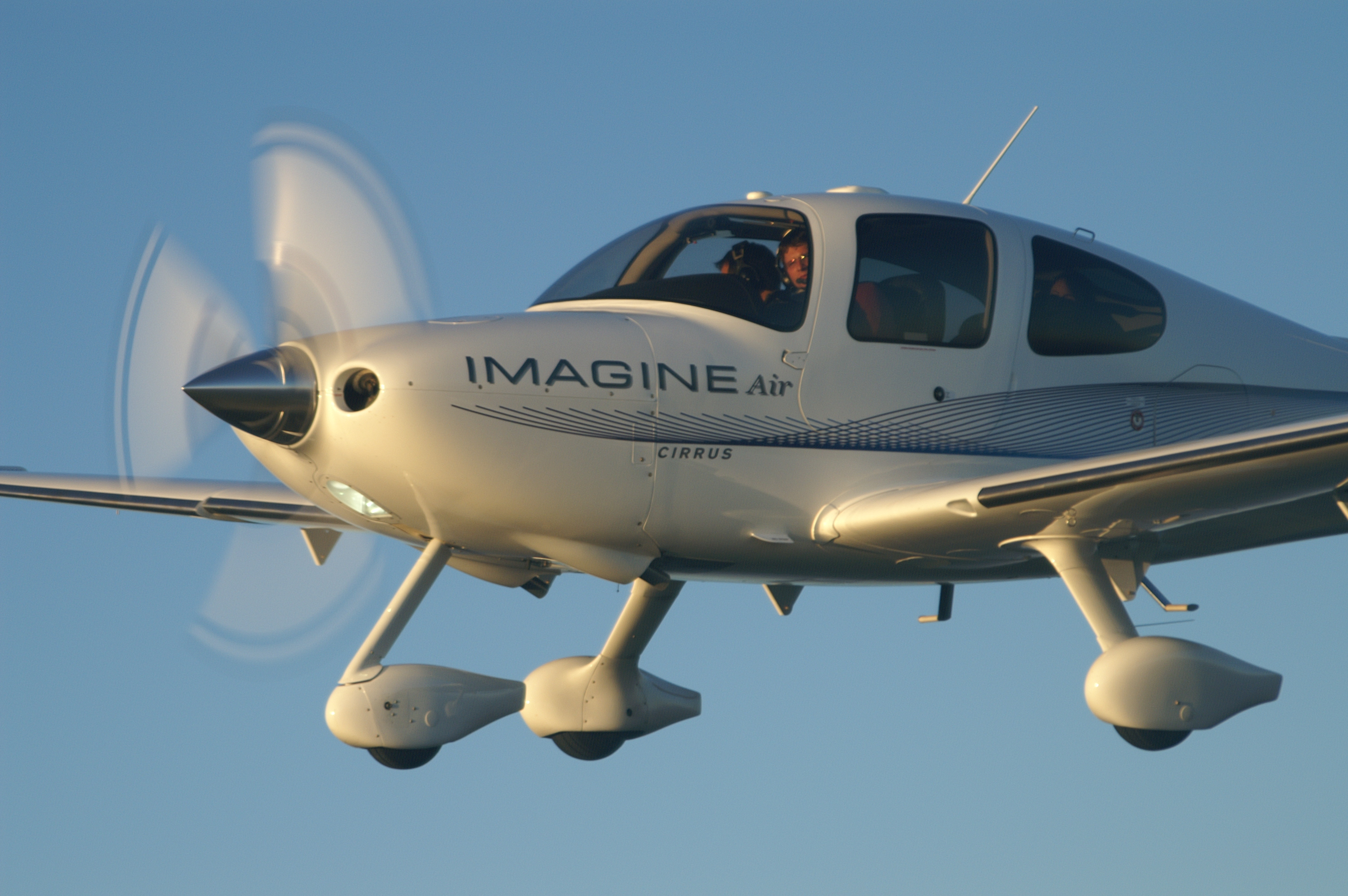
ImagineAir Cirrus SR22

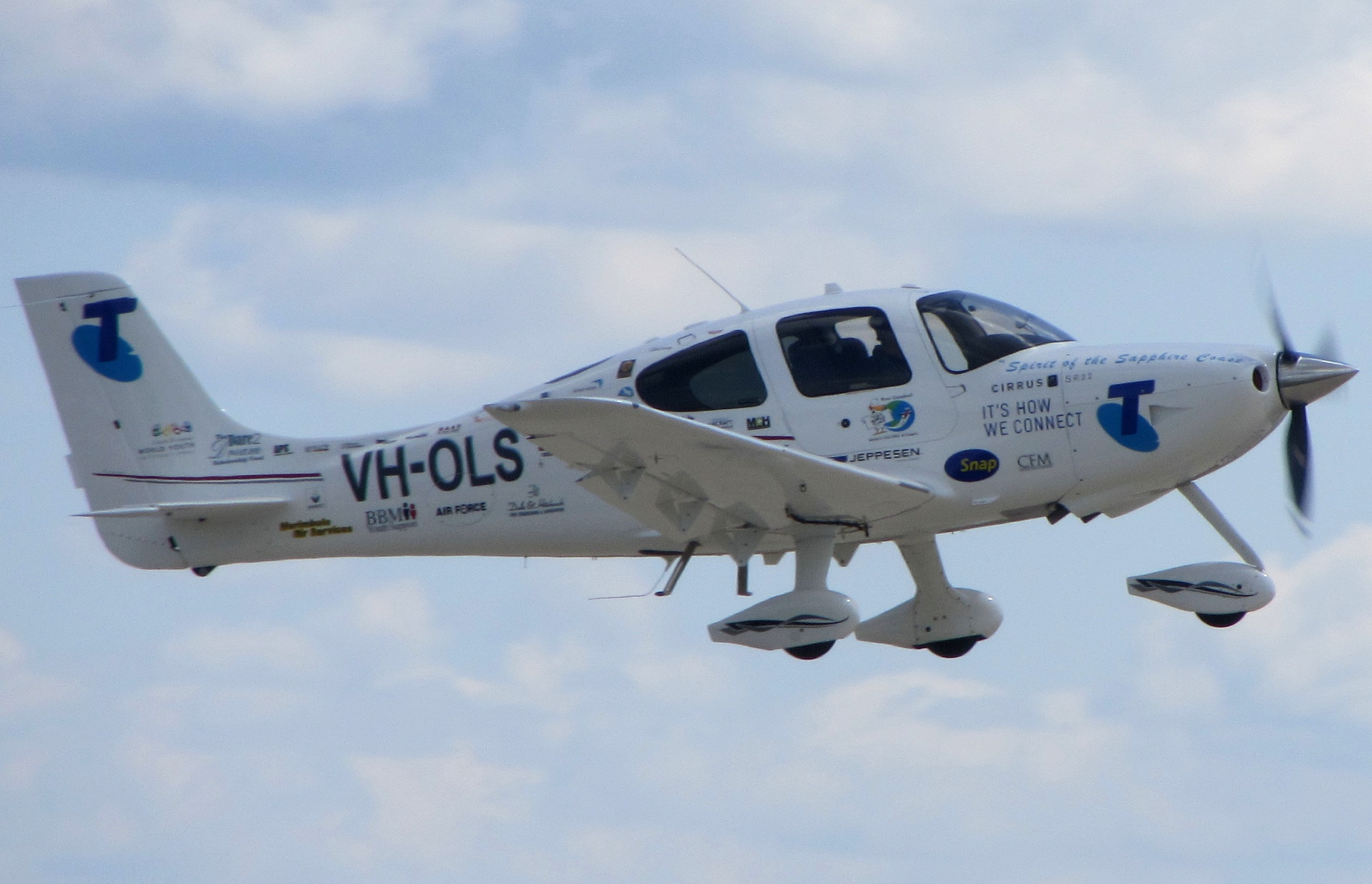
Ryan Campbell departing OSH on record attempt in 2013

For several years, the largest fleet of Cirrus SR22s was operated by ImagineAir, which was in operation from 2007 to 2018. Previously to this, the largest fleet had been operated by SATSair with 26 aircraft. It began operations in 2004 and went out of business in 2009. The largest European operator is Fly Aeolus, a Belgian fractional ownership company established in 2009 that operates 13 SR22s. In May 2022, California-based air taxi company Joby Aviation received Part 135 air service certification from the FAA to operate a fleet of SR22s, pending certification of its eVTOL aircraft.

Australian pilot Ryan Campbell used an SR22 to become the youngest pilot to fly solo around the world (a title which he held for nearly a year), at age nineteen. He completed his trip on 7 September 2013 in Wollongong. His SR22, Spirit of the Sapphire Coast, was modified by removing three seats and adding a 160 U.S. gallons (610 L; 130 imp gal) fuselage tank for a total of 250 U.S. gallons (950 L; 210 imp gal) usable.

The French Air and Space Force uses six SR22s as training aircraft, and the Royal Saudi Air Force acquired 25 SR22s in 2013, replacing Cessna 172s as primary trainers at the King Faisal Air Academy. In 2015 Emirates purchased 22 aircraft for training purposes. The Minnesota State Patrol uses a special missions "Cirrus Perception" SR22 for law enforcement operations, surveillance, search and rescue missions, and more.

=== Safety record ===
Between 2001 and May 2014, 147 U.S.-registered Cirrus SR22 aircraft crashed, killing 122 people.

In 2011, the accident record of the SR20/SR22 was examined by Aviation Consumer magazine. It found that the series' overall accident record is better than average for light aircraft, exceeded only by the Diamond DA40 and DA42. However, its fatal accident rate is worse, at 1.6 per 100,000 flight hours—which places it higher than the United States general aviation rate of 1.2, and higher than the Diamond DA40 (0.35), Cessna 172 (0.45), Diamond DA42 (0.54), Cessna 182 (0.69), and the Cessna 400 (1.0), despite the SR22's full aircraft parachute system.

By the end of 2013, the fatality rate had been reduced to 1.01 per 100,000 flight hours. This was attributed to better training, particularly in the use of the ballistic parachute system.

The fatality rate continued to decrease in 2014, to .42 per 100,000 flight hours, one of the industry's lowest. This marked the fewest fatalities in a single year for Cirrus since 2001, and the first year where the number of CAPS deployments (12) exceeded the number of fatal accidents (3).

As of September 2018, pilots had deployed the SR-series parachute 79 times, with 163 survivors.

After a failed CAPS deployment in March 2021, Cirrus issued a service bulletin and replaced the firing mechanism in the CAP systems (which control the primer material that ignites the chute's rocket) for 347 Cirrus SR aircraft and 26 SF50 Vision jets.

== Variants ==
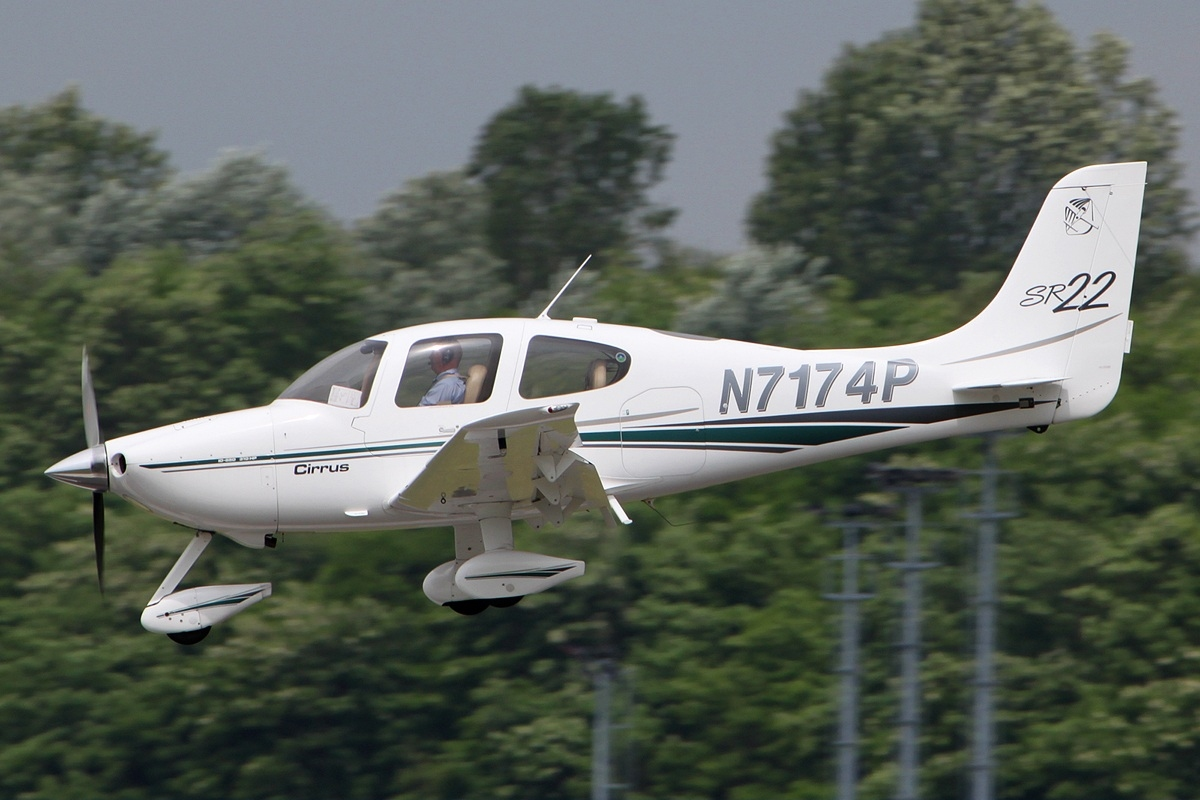
Original version SR22

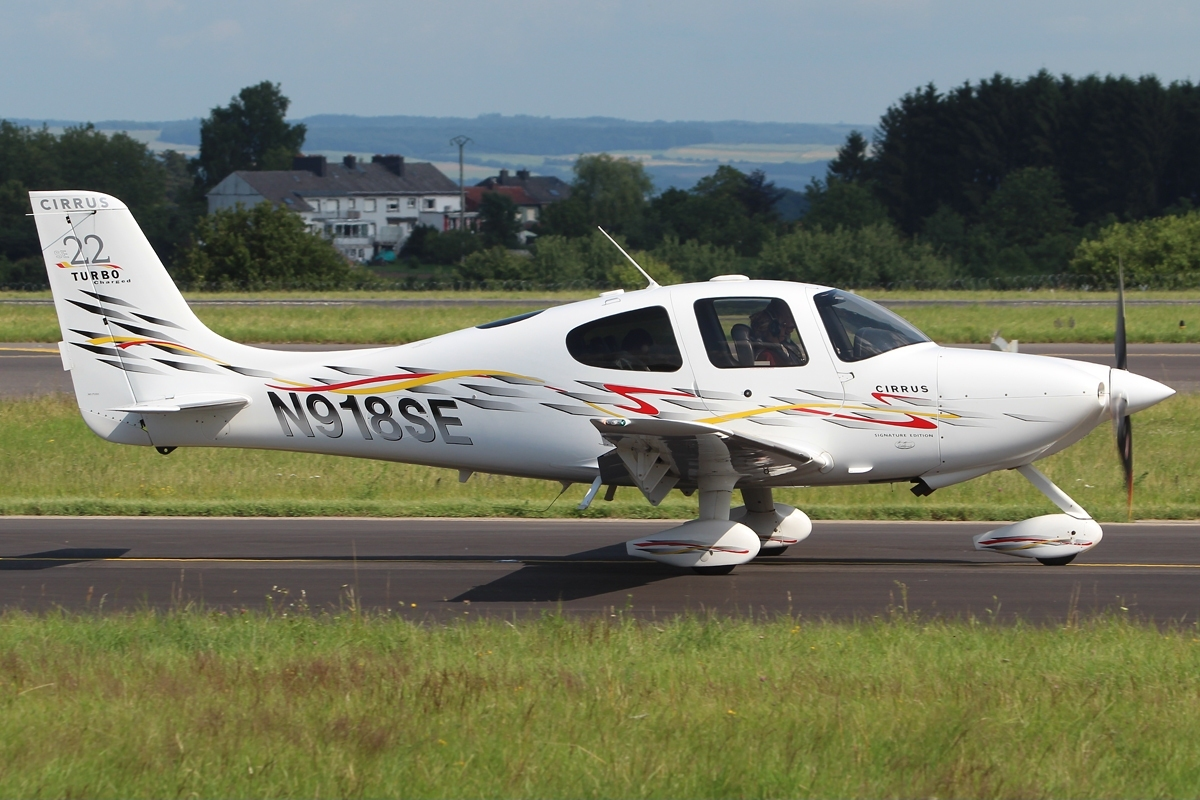
2006 "Signature Edition" SR22 G2

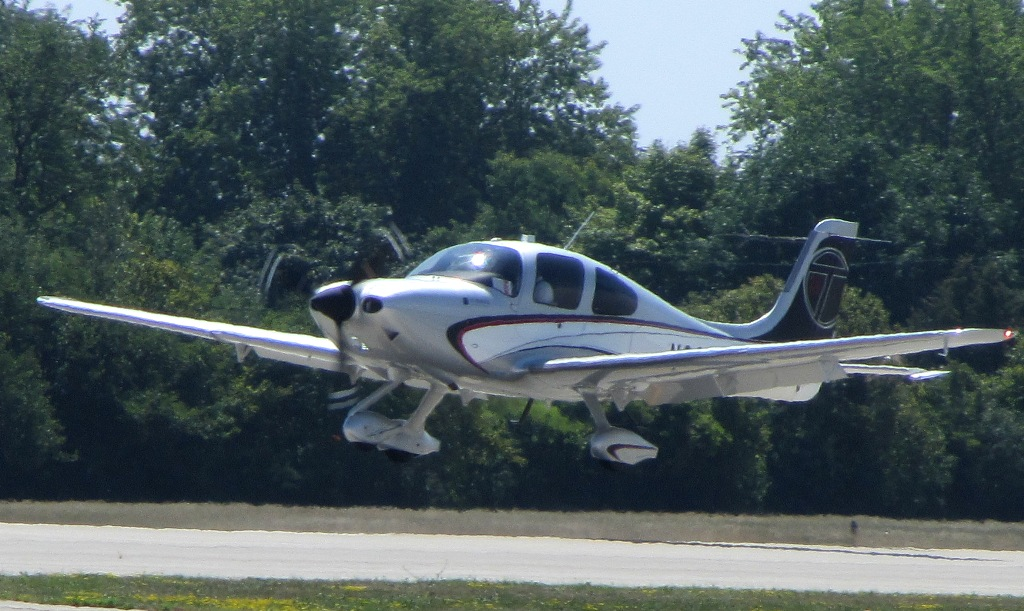
SR22T landing in 2012

SR22
Original version produced from 2001
SR22 G2
Improved variant introduced in 2004, including Avidyne avionics
SR22 Turbo G2
In July 2006, Cirrus announced a turbo normalized SR22. Some initial limited models were identified as SR22 G2 SEs (for "Signature Edition")—equipped with additional features including an unequally painted exterior, black leather seats, and the signatures of Cirrus founders Dale and Alan Klapmeier on the cowling, marking the 22nd anniversary of the company's founding.
SR22TN
Version with a Tornado Alley turbo-normalizing kit added to the Continental IO-550-N engine producing 310 hp (231 kW).
SR22 G3
Launched in April 2007, the SR22 G3 variant has an increased range and fuel capacity, from 81 to 92 U.S. gallons (310 to 350 L; 67 to 77 imp gal), a lighter carbon fiber wing spar, and longer landing gear for increased prop clearance. Upgraded models, such as the GTS, come with airbag seatbelts.
SR22T
Introduced in June 2010, the SR22T includes a turbocharged Continental TSIO-550-K producing 315 hp (235 kW). The engine has low-compression pistons, producing a 7.5 to 1 compression ratio to allow the engine to run on lower octane fuel, 94UL. The SR22T has a maximum cruise speed of 214 kn (396 km/h), an empty weight of 2,348 lb (1,065 kg), and a maximum operating altitude of 25,000 ft (7,620 m). This model also has a decreased useful load of 1,052 lb (477 kg) and a reduced range of 1,046 nmi (1,937 km), as well as a Hartzell three-blade lightweight composite prop.
SR22/22T G5
On 17 January 2013, Cirrus Aircraft announced the G5 SR22 and SR22T (skipping G4 as a designation for the new version of the aircraft due to Tetraphobia). Features included a 200 lb (91 kg) increase in the maximum takeoff weight, and some previous options—60/40 split back seat, ADS-B transponder, and Garmin GFC700 autopilot—became standard equipment. The wheel pants were redesigned and included an access door for the inflator valve. Cirrus improved the aircraft's ballistic parachute using a larger canopy to account for the higher takeoff weight, and a more powerful rocket. The rocket firing changed to a fail-safe electronic ignition, with a maximum operating speed of 140 knots (up from 133 knots). Earlier versions used a pyrotechnic rocket ignition system. Maximum flap speeds were increased to 150 knots (first notch); 110 knots (second notch); and added another 3.5 degrees of extension. Fuel burn slightly increased at cruise speeds, rate of climb was reduced, liftoff speed increased to 80 knots (from 72 knots), and stall speed increased to 60 knots (from 58 knots).
SR22/22T G6
Introduced in January 2017, the G6 model adds new LED wingtip lights and an updated Garmin avionics flight deck (known as "Cirrus Perspective-Plus") with a 10-times faster instrument processing speed and several other upgrades.
TRAC22/22T
Introduced in September 2019, the TRAC is a flight-training version SR22/22T with a simplified, more durable interior, Perspective+ flight deck, rear seat push-to-talk functionality, and simulated retractable landing gear controls.
SR Series G7
On 11 January 2024, Cirrus announced the G7 of the SR series, including a redesigned interior, Cirrus Perspective Touch+ flight deck with 35% larger instrument touch screens, a contextualized 3D taxi guide, stick shaker functions for the side-yokes to warn of an approaching stall condition, a new flap airspeed protection system, an automatic fuel selection system, a pushbutton engine start interface, an updated automated flight control system (AFCS), increased legroom, and a lower glareshield for better forward visibility, in addition to other improvements to the cockpit. The 2024 base price for a non-turbocharged SR22 was $844,900 and a GTS version, including air conditioning and ice protection, was $1,049,900. The base price of the SR22T was $969,900 in 2024 and $1,174,900 for the GTS. In May 2025, Cirrus announced the G7+ equipped with Safe Return emergency autoland by Garmin.

== Operators ==
=== Civil ===
The SR22 is used by flying schools, several air charter and small air taxi carriers, as well as private individuals and companies.

=== Military and government ===
United States

- Minnesota State Patrol – 1
- Harris County Sheriff's Office – 1

El Salvador

- Salvadoran Air Force – 2

France

- French Air and Space Force – 6

Chile

- Chilean Air Force – 8

Portugal

- Portuguese Air Force – 12

United Arab Emirates

- Emirates Flight Training Academy – 22 (Note: Starting in 2017, the SR22s are used by the academy for the country's National Cadet Training Program.)

Saudi Arabia

- Royal Saudi Air Force – 25

== Accidents and incidents ==
SR22s have been involved in numerous accidents and incidents, with some of the most notable being:

- On November 3, 2015, former Walmart CEO William S. Simon deployed CAPS in his SR22T over Fayetteville, Arkansas, near the University of Arkansas when the plane experienced engine trouble. A vehicle struck the aircraft on a busy road after it had touched down. All parties involved suffered only minor injuries.
- On May 12, 2021, a Swearingen Metroliner SA226-TC and an SR22 collided on approach to Centennial Airport near Denver, Colorado. The Cirrus pilot deployed CAPS and made a safe off-airport parachute-assisted landing; the Metroliner pilot landed safely at Centennial with damage to the cabin and empennage. No injuries were reported. The accident was attributed to the SR22 pilot overshooting his turn, while the failure of air traffic control to alert the Metroliner pilot of the approaching SR22 was a contributing factor.
- On September 18, 2025, an SR22T owned by country musician Brett James departed John C. Tune Airport in Nashville, Tennessee and crashed near North Carolina's Macon County Airport, killing James and two other occupants. The FAA and NTSB are currently investigating the accident.

== Specifications (SR22-G5) ==
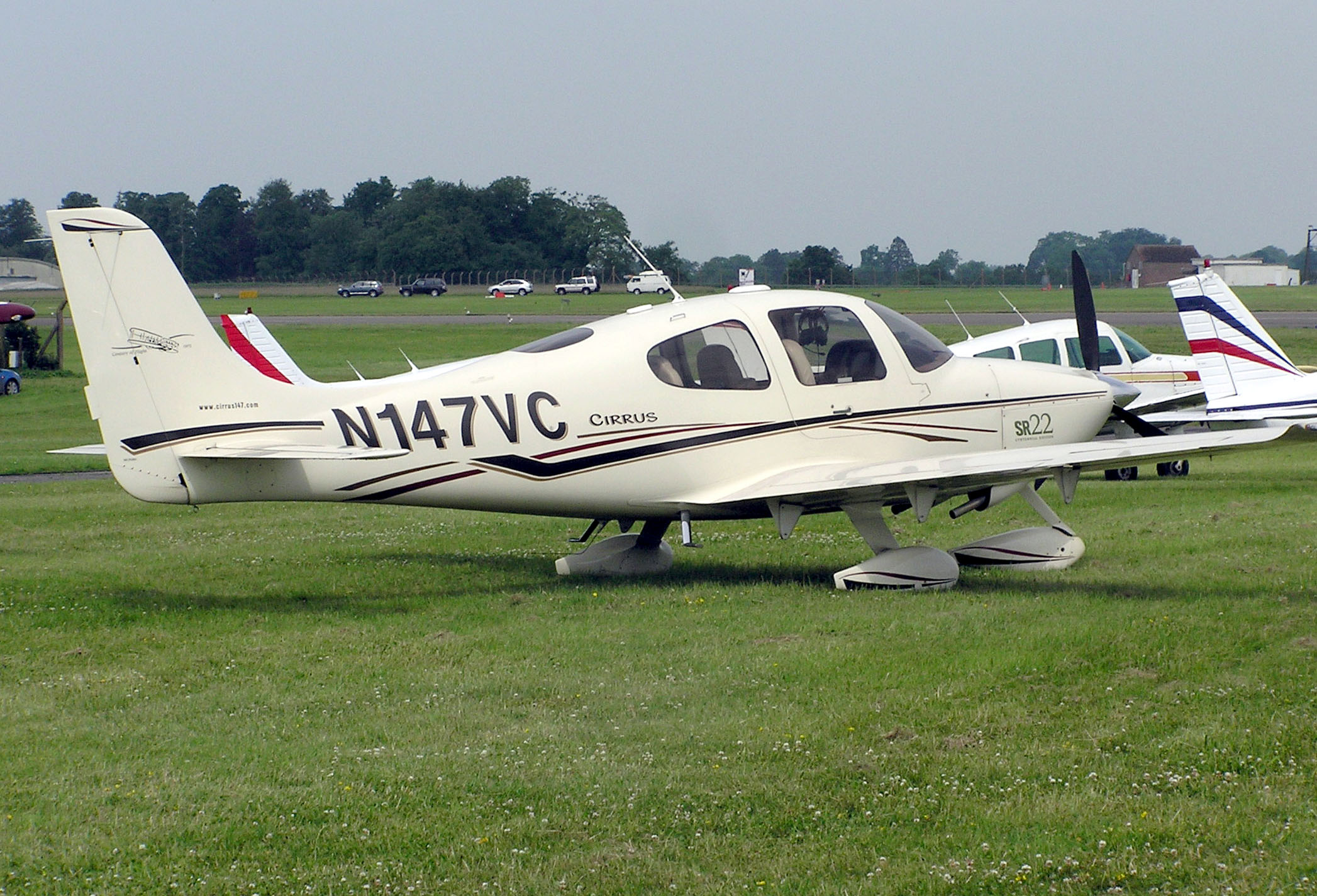
2003 model-year "Centennial Edition" SR22, showing part of the aircraft's rear window

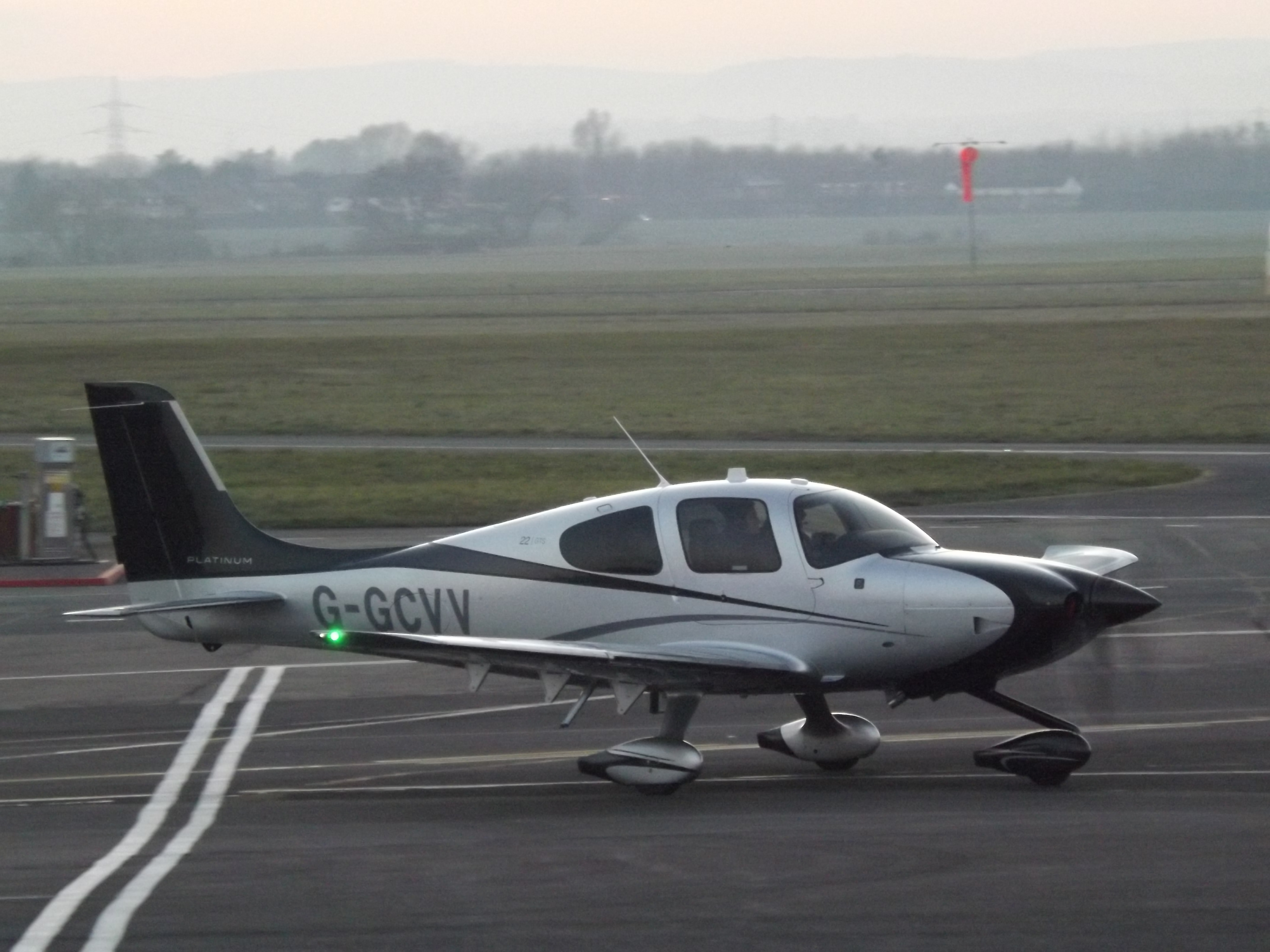
2015 SR22 GTS G5

Data from Cirrus website and The Incomplete Guide to Airfoil Usage

General characteristics

- Crew: 1 pilot
- Capacity: 3 passengers (4 using 60/40 flex seating)
- Length: 26 ft 0 in (7.92 m)
- Wingspan: 38 ft 4 in (11.68 m)
- Height: 8 ft 11 in (2.72 m)
- Airfoil: Roncz
- Empty weight: 2,269 lb (1,029 kg)
- Gross weight: 3,600 lb (1,633 kg)
- Fuel capacity: 92 US gallons (348 litres)
- Powerplant: 1 × Continental IO-550-N Six cylinder horizontally opposed aircraft engine, 310 hp (230 kW)
- Propellers: 3-bladed

Performance

- Cruise speed: 183 kn (211 mph, 339 km/h)
- Stall speed: 60 kn (69 mph, 110 km/h) flaps down
- Range: 1,049 nmi (1,207 mi, 1,943 km) with reserves at 65% power
- Service ceiling: 17,500 ft (5,300 m)
- Rate of climb: 1,270 ft/min (6.5 m/s)

Avionics

- Garmin Cirrus Perspective integrated avionics system
- LEMO REDEL 6-pin push-pull audio connector

== See also ==
Related development

- Cirrus SR20
- Cirrus Vision SF50

Aircraft of comparable role, configuration, and era

- Cessna 400
- Diamond DA50
- KAI KC-100
- Mooney M20
- Pipistrel Panthera
- Van's Aircraft RV-10
