= William S. Simon =

William S. Simon (born 1960) is a professor and former business executive who served as president and chief executive officer (CEO) of Walmart U.S. and Executive Vice-president of Walmart Inc. from June 29, 2010, to August 8, 2014.

Simon received his B.A. and M.B.A. from the University of Connecticut. Before joining Walmart in 2006, he was at Brinker International and at the Florida State Department of Management Services. He spent 25 years in the U.S. Navy and U.S. Navy Reserve. He taught as an adjunct professor at Baylor University and was a member of the Baylor Board of Regents. He also serves on the board of directors for Darden Restaurants.

As it grappled with sluggish store sales, Walmart said on July 24, 2014, that Simon was stepping down and was being replaced by the head of the company's Asia operations, Gregory Foran.

In November 2015, over Fayetteville, Arkansas, Simon floated to safety after deploying the Cirrus Airframe Parachute System on his Cirrus SR22 aircraft, which was experiencing engine trouble.
