= Eclipse (disambiguation) =

An eclipse is an astronomical event.

Eclipse may also refer to:

== Places ==
- Eclipse Island (Queensland), Australia, an island of the Great Palm Island group
- Eclipse Island (Western Australia), a barren island near Albany

== Arts, entertainment, and media ==
=== Fictional entities ===
- Chief Eclipse, a character in the anime series Kiddy Grade
- Eclipse, a Star Destroyer, spaceship in the Star Wars universe
- Eclipse, a caste in the roleplaying game Exalted
- Eclipse (Marcos Diaz), a character in The Gifted

=== Film ===
- Eclipse (DVD brand), a line of DVD sets from the Criterion Collection
- Eclipse, a French film production company founded in 1906 by Charles Urban
- Eclipse (1934 film), by Hiroshi Shimizu
- Eclipse (1962 film), by Michelangelo Antonioni
- Eclipse (1994 film), by Jeremy Podeswa
- The Eclipse, or the Courtship of the Sun and Moon, a 1907 film by Georges Méliès
- The Eclipse (2009 film), by Conor McPherson
- The Twilight Saga: Eclipse, 2010, adaptation of the Meyer novel

=== Television ===
==== TV shows ====
- Eclipse (TV series), a Mexican telenovela
- The Eclipse (TV series), a 2022 Thai television series
- Eclipse Music TV, an Australian music television show

==== TV episodes ====
- "Eclipse" (Baywatch), a 1990 episode
- "Eclipse" (Big Love), a 2006 episode
- "The Eclipse" (Heroes), a 2008 episode
- "Eclipsed" (The Penguins of Madagascar episode)
- "The Day of Black Sun Part 2: The Eclipse", an Avatar: The Last Airbender episode

=== Music ===
==== Music organizations ====
- Eclipse Records, a record label
- Eclipse (band), a Swedish rock band
- The Eclipse (club), a nightclub formerly in Coventry, England
- Bini & Martini, Italian duo, known by the pseudonym "Eclipse"

==== Albums ====
- Eclipse (Amorphis album), 2006
- Eclipse (Autumn Tears album), 2004
- Eclipse (CANO album), 1978
- Eclipse (Five Star album), 2001
- Eclipse (G.G.F.H. album), 1991
- Eclipse (Glorium album), 1997
- Eclipse (Journey album), 2011
- Eclipse (Smokie album), 2008
- Eclipse (Twin Shadow album), 2015
- Eclipse (Veil of Maya album), 2012
- Eclipse (Yngwie Malmsteen album), 1990
- Esenciales: Eclipse, by Maná, 2003
- The Twilight Saga: Eclipse (soundtrack), 2010
- Eclipse (EP), by EXID, 2017
- Eclipsed (album), by Fellowship Creative, 2016

==== Songs ====
- "Eclipse" (Pink Floyd song), from the 1973 album The Dark Side of the Moon
- "Eclipse" (Hardwell song), 2015
- "Eclipse" (Delta Goodrem song), 2026
- "Eclipse", from the 1974 album Back Home Again by John Denver
- "Eclipse", from the 2000 album Made Me Do It by The Haunted
- "Eclipse", from the 2000 album Welcome to Earth by Apoptygma Berzerk
- "Eclipse", from the 2002 album Eternal Endless Infinity by Visions of Atlantis
- "Eclipse", from the 2005 album Robyn by Robyn
- "Eclipsed", from the 2011 album Edge of the Earth by Sylosis
- "Eclipse", from the 2013 album Apocalyze by Crossfaith
- "Eclipse", from the 2017 single album Kim Lip by Loona
- "Eclipse", from the 2019 EP Spinning Top by Got7
- "Eclipse", from the 2019 album Alien by Northlane
- "Eclipse", from the 2020 album Libra by Lali
- "Eclipse", from the 2020 EP Dark Side of the Moon by Moonbyul
- "Eclipse", from the 2022 album Reckoner by Trenches
- "Eclipse", from the 2026 album No Me Arrepiento de Sentir Tanto by Karol G

==== Other uses in music ====
- Eclipse (Takemitsu), a 1966 composition by Japanese composer Toru Takemitsu
- ESP Eclipse, an electric guitar model

=== Literature ===
==== Fiction books ====
- Eclipse (Trumbo novel), 1935, by Dalton Trumbo
- Eclipse, a 1977 novel by Dirk Wittenborn
- Eclipse, a 1986 novel by William Stevenson
- Eclipse, a 1983 novel by Cynthia Felice
- Eclipse, a 1994 novel by Louise Cooper, the second installment in the Star Shadow trilogy
- Eclipse (Banville novel), 2000, by John Banville
- Eclipse, a 2002 novel by Cate Tiernan, the 12th installment in the Sweep series
- Eclipse, a 2002 novel by Richard S. Wheeler
- Eclipse (Judge Dredd novel), a 2004 novel by James Swallow, based on the comics character from 2000 AD
- Eclipse (Bedford novel), a 2005 science fiction novel by K. A. Bedford
- Eclipse, a 2006 novel by Andrea Cheng
- Eclipse (Meyer novel), 2007, by Stephenie Meyer, the third installment in the Twilight series
- Eclipse, a 2008 novel in the Warriors: Power of Three series by Erin Hunter
- Eclipse, a 2009 novel by Richard North Patterson
- Eclipse Trilogy, a 1985-90 series of science fiction novels by John Shirley
- Eclipses, a 1983 novel by Cynthia Felice

==== Other uses in literature ====
- Eclipse Comics, an American comic book publisher
  - Eclipse Magazine, a black-and-white anthology published by Eclipse Comics
  - Eclipse Monthly, a full-color anthology published by Eclipse Comics
- L'Éclipse, a 19th-century French newspaper
- The Eclipse (James Fenimore Cooper), an 1869 autobiographical vignette by James Fenimore Cooper
- The Eclipse: A Memoir of Suicide, a 2003 memoir by Antonella Gambotto-Burke

=== Games ===
- Eclipse (board game), a strategy board game
- Eclipse: New Dawn for the Galaxy (video game), 2013
- Eclipse (play-by-mail game), a 1980s space-based play-by-mail game

=== Other arts ===
- Eclipse (Sebastian), a 2003 sculpture by Jill Sebastian

== Computing ==
- Eclipse (software), a software development platform
  - Eclipse Foundation, a nonprofit organization to develop Eclipse (software) projects
- ECLiPSe, a constraint logic programming system
- Alias Eclipse, a professional image-editing application
- Data General Eclipse, a line of minicomputers
- Eclipse ERP, distribution management software
- Eclipse Internet, an Internet service provider

== Sport ==
=== Greyhound and horse racing ===
- Eclipse (greyhounds), a greyhound racing competition
- Eclipse (horse), an 18th-century racehorse
- Eclipse Award, a horse racing award
- Eclipse Stakes, a horse race

=== Sporting grounds ===
- Eclipse Park (Milwaukee), a former baseball ground in Wisconsin, US
- Eclipse Park, the name of two former baseball grounds in Kentucky, US

=== Teams ===
- Louisville Eclipse, a professional baseball team
- Phoenix Eclipse, a professional basketball team

== Transportation ==
=== Air and space transportation ===
- Eclipse Aviation, a defunct jet manufacturer based in Albuquerque, New Mexico, US
  - Eclipse 400, a very light jet aircraft developed but never produced
  - Eclipse 500, a very light jet aircraft produced from 2006 to 2008
- Eclipse Aerospace, a now-defunct predecessor company to Eclipse Aviation
  - Eclipse 550, a very light jet aircraft produced from 2014 to 2017
- Phase 3 Eclipse, ultralight aircraft
- Sol Eclipse, a Brazilian paraglider design
- Eclipse (rocket), a medium-lift launch vehicle under development by Firefly Aerospace and Northrop Grumman

=== Land transportation ===
- Eclipse (car electronics), a GPS car navigation and audio system brand of Japanese company Denso Ten
- Eclipse (dog), a Seattle dog known for riding the bus by herself
- Mitsubishi Eclipse, a compact sports car
- Mitsubishi Eclipse Cross, a compact crossover SUV, not related to the Mitsubishi Eclipse sports car
- Wright Eclipse, a bus body

=== Water transportation ===
- Eclipse, a characteristic of light patterns in navigation
- Com-Pac Eclipse, an American sailboat design
- Eclipse (yacht), owned by Russian billionaire Roman Abramovich
- Eclipse, a trimaran sailboat designed by Robert B. Harris
- Celebrity Eclipse, a 2010 cruise ship
- Eclipse-class cruiser, a 19th-century class of British Royal Navy cruisers
- HMS Eclipse, the name of several British Royal Navy ships
- USS Eclipse (SP-417), a US Navy patrol vessel in commission from 1917 to 1919

=== Other uses in transportation ===
- Eclipse Machine Company, an American bicycle and aircraft component manufacturer

== Mouth-held products ==
- Eclipse (breath freshener), a Wrigley brand of chewing gum and breath mint
- Eclipse (cigarette), an American cigarette brand

== Other uses ==
- Eclipse (Ferris wheel), in Thorpe Park, Surrey, UK
- Eclipse plumage, a phase in the coloring of some birds

== See also ==
- Eclipsed (play), 2015, by Danai Gurira
- Total Eclipse (disambiguation)
- Eclipes, a genus of fish
- Eclipsis, a consonant mutation in the Irish language
- Eclipsis, a historical name of the dash, a punctuation mark
- Ellipse, a curve on a plane
- Ellipsis, a series of dots
