= Total Eclipse =

A total eclipse is an eclipse where the eclipsed body is completely obscured. Total eclipse may also refer to:

== People ==
- Total Eclipse, a DJ from The X-Ecutioners

== Arts, entertainment, and media ==
=== Music ===
==== Groups ====
- Total Eclipse (American band), a power metal band from San Francisco
- Total Eclipse (French band), a Goa trance music group

==== Albums ====
- Total Eclipse (Billy Cobham album), 1974
- Total Eclipse (Black Moon album), 2003
- Total Eclipse (Bobby Hutcherson album), 1969

==== Songs ====
- "Total Eclipse", a song by Alan Parsons Project from the album, I Robot
- "Total Eclipse", an aria from George Frideric Handel's oratorio Samson
- "Total Eclipse", a song by Iron Maiden from the album, The Number of the Beast
- "Total Eclipse", a song written by Kristian Hoffman and recorded by Klaus Nomi on the album Klaus Nomi
- "Total Eclipse" / "Die schwarze Witwe", a double A-side single by Rosenstolz featuring Marc Almond and Nina Hagen

=== Games ===
- Total Eclipse (1988 video game), a first-person adventure game
- Total Eclipse (1994 video game), a space shooter
- Total Eclipse (Shadowrun), a role-playing adventure for Shadowrun, 1991
- Total Eclipse (role-playing game), a generic role-playing game, 2011

=== Literature ===
- Muv-Luv Alternative: Total Eclipse, a Japanese novel series, spin-off of the Muv-Luv franchise
- Total Eclipse, a novel by John Brunner

=== Other arts, entertainment, and media ===
- Total Eclipse (comics), a comic book published by Eclipse Comics
- Total Eclipse (film), a film about Arthur Rimbaud, starring Leonardo DiCaprio
- "Total Eclipse" (Robin Hood), 2009 BBC television series episode
- Total Eclipse (web series), 2018 web series produced by Brat

== Other uses ==
- Total Eclipse, the manufacturer designation for an upgraded Eclipse 500 aircraft; cf. Eclipse Aerospace

== See also ==
- Total Eclipse of the Heart, a song by Bonnie Tyler
