= Fellowship Creative =

- Origin: Grapevine, Texas, U.S.
- Genres: CCM, praise & worship
- Labels: Fair Trade, UOI
- Website: fellowshipcreative.com

Fellowship Creative is an American-Christian praise & worship band from Grapevine, Texas. The band are based out of Fellowship Church. They have released three albums that charted on Billboard charts: Always Been about You (2013), Running to Follow (2014), and Eclipsed (2016). The group signed with Fair Trade Services in 2014. Although Fellowship Creative is the name of the band, Fellowship Creative is also the name given to all volunteers across all of Fellowship Church's different campuses that work with worship related items, also called the Creative Team or Creatives individually.

== Background ==
Fellowship Creative is based out of Fellowship Church in Grapevine, Texas.

== History ==
Fellowship Creative first began producing albums in collaboration with UOI Records in 2011 with The Everlasting and Capturing Christmas. The following February (2012), the band released an EP entitled Rooftops. In 2013, Fellowship Creative released Always Been About You, which charted on the Billboard Christian Albums chart at No. 33, and at No. 15 on the Heatseekers Albums chart. In 2014, the band signed to and partnered with Fair Trade Services to release their first studio album entitled Running to Follow which charted on the Billboard Christian Albums chart at No. 22 and on the Heatseekers Albums chart at No. 11. In 2015, Fellowship Creative dropped a new EP entitled Alive in Us followed in 2016 with their newest full-length album, Eclipsed, which charted on the Billboard Christian Albums chart at No. 24 and on the Heatseekers Album chart at No. 21.

== Discography ==
Albums

List of albums with selected chart positions
Title	Album details	Peak chart positions	
Title	Album details	US CHR	US HEAT
The Everlasting	Released: July 12, 2011; Label: UOI Records; CD, digital download	–	–
Capturing Christmas	Released: November 26, 2011; Label: UOI Records; CD, digital download	–	–
Always Been about You	Released: February 12, 2013; Label: UOI Records; CD, digital download	33	15
Running to Follow	Released: May 13, 2014; Label: Fair Trade Services; CD, digital download	22	11
The Mix: We Will R.I.O.T.	Released: September 16, 2014; Label: UOI Records; CD, digital download	-	-
Eclipsed	Released: January 29, 2016; Label: Fair Trade Services; CD, digital download	24	21

EPs

- Rooftops (EP) (February 15, 2012, UOI Records)
- Alive in Us (March 31, 2015, Fair Trade Services)
