= Jill Sebastian =

Jill Sebastian (born 1950 in Libertyville, Illinois) is an American educational innovator, integrated public artist and multi-media artist.

== Early life and career ==
Jill Sebastian characterizes herself as growing up in small towns within the Rust Belt. Her first awareness of the impact of art was from seeing a "lone woman at a steel mill paint a mural to celebrate the conclusion of long, bitter labor strikes." Sebastian attended three undergraduate colleges including Northern Illinois University and the University of Wisconsin Madison before earning a BFA in Sculpture and Drawing from the University of Wisconsin Milwaukee. After earning an MFA in Post-Graduate work in Film Theory and History from the University of Wisconsin Milwaukee, Sebastian went on to lecture and assistant teach at universities including the University of Wisconsin Milwaukee, the University of Wisconsin Whitewater, the University of Denver, and the Burren College of Art. In 1985, Sebastian received a National Endowment for the Arts Fellowship and in 1988, she began teaching at the Milwaukee Institute of Art and Design (MIAD) as a Professor of Sculpture. She received the 2010 Woman of Influence Award from the Business Journal of Greater Milwaukee where she was honored in the Innovation category as having her collaborative, selfless yet bold vision seen throughout the city's and state's landscapes, buildings, classrooms, museums, and performance venues. Since then her contributions to MIAD have included an adapted foundry pulley system that has been incorporated to many outside foundries since its implementation, setting up Public Art classes in collaboration with Milwaukee communities and colleges, and helping develop the New Studio Practice major implemented in 2015. She received Professor Emeritus from MIAD in 2017.

Besides her teaching career, she has had a full professional artistic career including sculpture, public art, installations, and collaborations. Her early solo exhibition at Berth Urdang Gallery blended unraveled narratives with cinematic ideas made physical in text-clad sculpture. Subtle questions of place, perception and movement continue to permeate her installations, drawings and interdisciplinary collaborations shown in New York, Los Angeles, Chicago and other cities in the USA. The first installation in The Milwaukee Art Museum’s new Calatrava-designed addition was her site-specific collaboration with Wild Space Dance Company (2005). Sebastian’s public works include a playable musical fence in New Orleans, Eclipse Lake Bluff Terrace, Milwaukee, WI, Vliet Street Commons in Washington Heights, Milwaukee, Wisconsin, and Midwest Airline Center portals located in the Milwaukee, Wisconsin Center. Possibly the most controversial work is her Philosophers' Stones commissioned in 2004 by the City of Madison, Wisconsin and removed in 2015. After her 55 granite and bronze forms fell under much blame for unwanted behavior, the arts board decided to remove 11 stones. She held an event she named State Street Stories: A Requiem, to say farewell to the project "that didn't entirely happen."

Currently Jill Sebastian lives and works in Milwaukee, Wisconsin.

== More recent selected exhibitions ==
Elaine Erickson Gallery, Milwaukee, Wisconsin, The Meaningful Object, curated by John Balsley 2008

Milwaukee Art Museum, Print Portfolio, curated, and printed by Daryl Jensen 2004

Cardinal Stritch University, Mequon, Wisconsin, Wisconsin Sculpture 2002

Wayne State University, Detroit, Michigan, Process curated by John Richards 2000

Milwaukee Art Museum, Wisconsin Painting and Sculpture from the Permanent Collection, 1999

Crossman Gallery, University of Wisconsin-Whitewater, Art as Collaboration 1998

Skuggi Gallery, Rockford, Illinois 1996 and 1997

== Public art commissions ==
New South Campus Union, University of Wisconsin Madison, integrated art

IN:SITE, My Vote Performs, video installation Suffragium, Milwaukee, Wisconsin 2008

State Street, Madison, Wisconsin streetscape Philosophers Stones with Ken Saiki Landscape Architects and MSA Professional Services 2003

Genome Center, University of Wisconsin Madison, integrated art Ostinato 2004

Washington Heights, Milwaukee, Wisconsin, pocket park Vliet Street Commons, 2002

Lake Bluff Terrace, Milwaukee, Wisconsin, sculpture Eclipse 2000

Midwest Airlines Convention Center, Milwaukee, Wisconsin, integrated art, with Woodland Pattern Book Center, Thompson, Ventulett, Stainback & Associates and Engberg/Anderson Design Group 1998

Toucan Du, New Orleans, Louisiana, integrated art, Untitled fence installation 1993

== Selected collections ==
Kit Basquin, New York, New York

Burpee Art Museum, Rockford, Illinois

University of Denver, Denver, Colorado

Carol Engelson, New York, New York

Entertainment Productions, Birmingham, Michigan

First Bank – Milwaukee, Milwaukee, Wisconsin

Haggerty Museum of Art, Marquette University, Milwaukee, Wisconsin

George and Angela Jacobi, Milwaukee, Wisconsin

Jane Langley, Pacific Palisades, California

Donald Levy, Palm Springs, California

Pamela Levy, Aspen, Colorado

Madeleine and David Lubar, Milwaukee, Wisconsin

Milwaukee Art Museum, Milwaukee, Wisconsin

Ruth and Marvin Sackner Archive of Concrete and Visual Poetry, Miami Beach, Florida

Ellen Sollod, Seattle, Washington

Buzz Spector, St. Louis, Missouri

Bertha Urdang Estate, Tel Aviv, Israel

Webcrafters, Madison, Wisconsin
