= One Aviation =

Defunct American aerospace manufacturer

- Company type: Private
- Industry: Aerospace
- Founded: 2015
- Defunct: 2021
- Fate: Chapter 7 liquidation
- Successor: Eclipse Aerospace, Inc.
- Headquarters: Albuquerque, New Mexico, United States
- Key people: Alan Klapmeier (CEO); Steve Serfling (COO)
- Products: Eclipse 550, Kestrel K-350
- Divisions: Eclipse Aerospace and Kestrel Aircraft
- Website: Archives

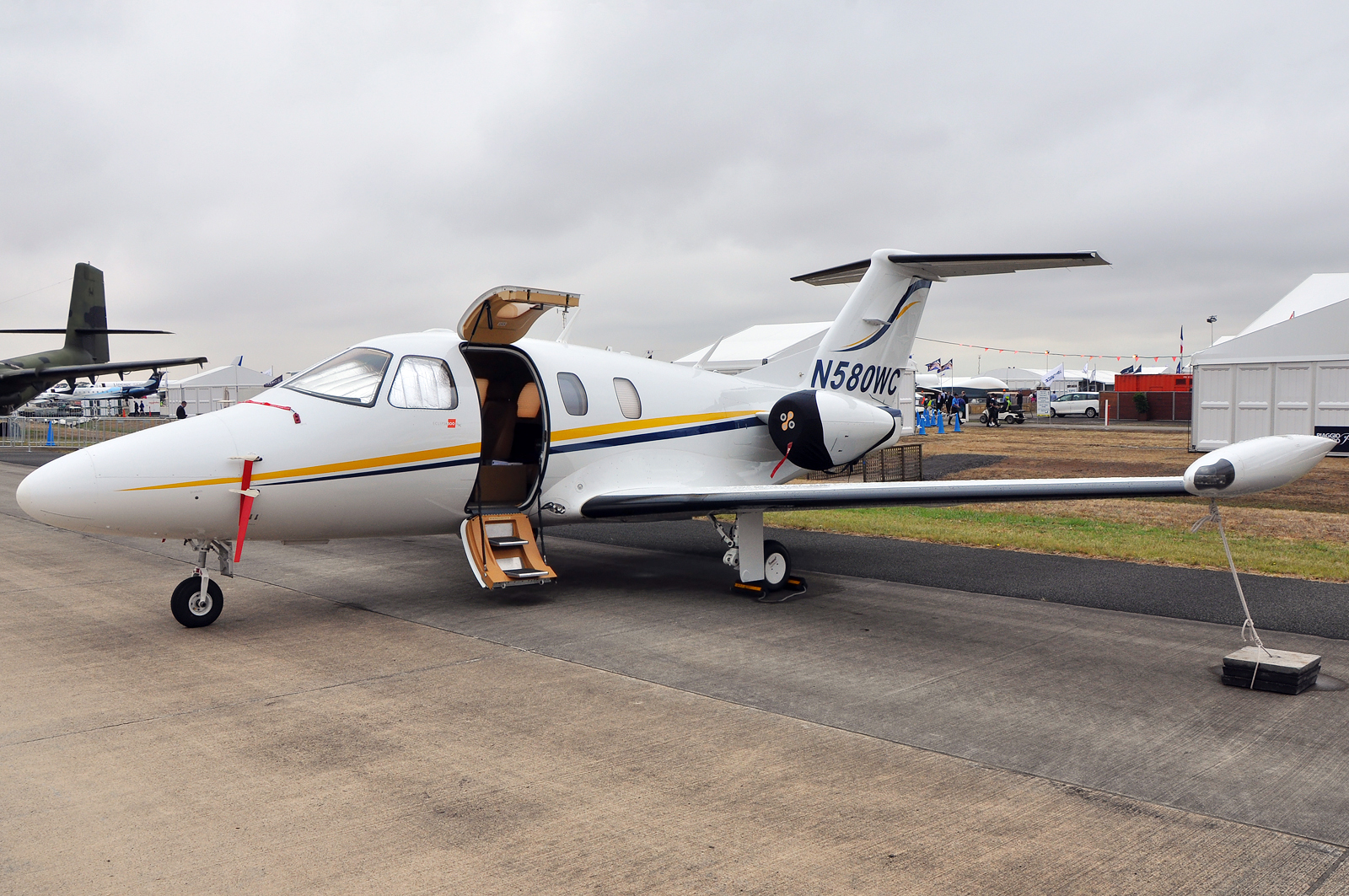
Eclipse 550 twin engine VLJ

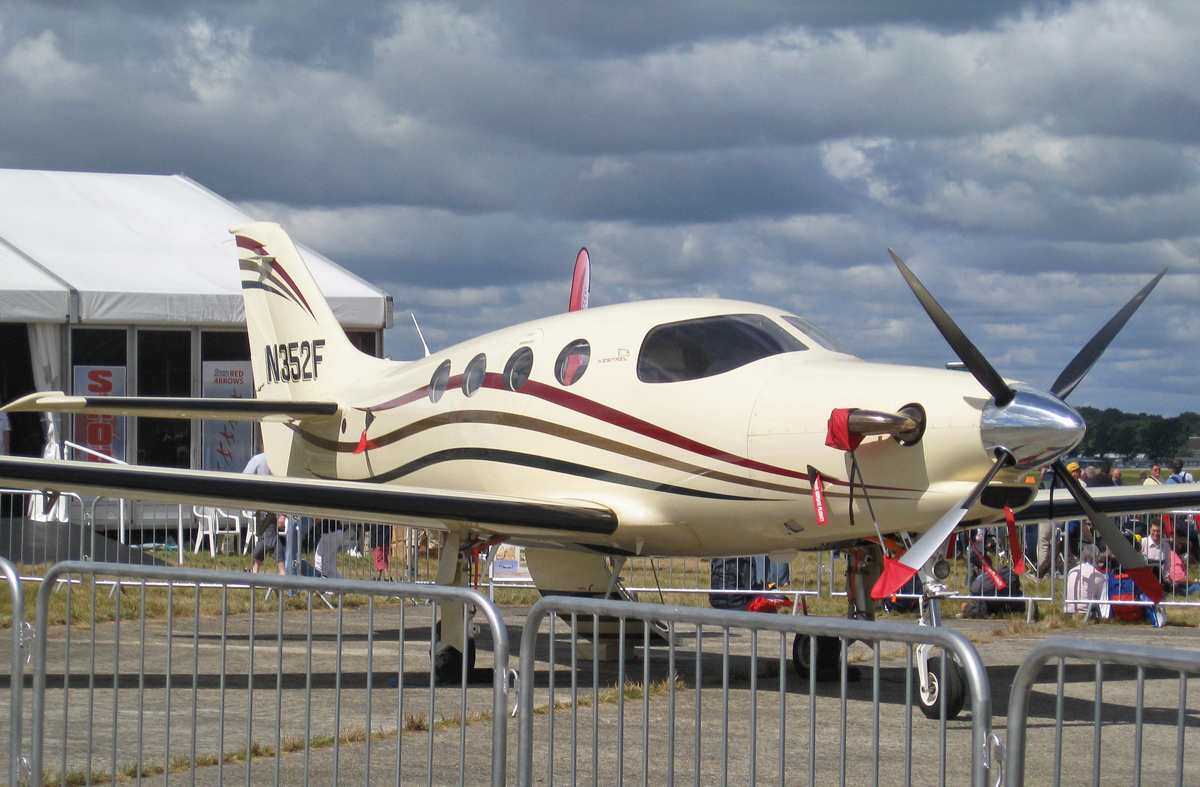
Kestrel K-350 single-engine turboprop aircraft

The One Aviation Corporation, stylized as ONE Aviation, was a company formed in 2015 to merge the aircraft manufacturers Eclipse Aerospace and Kestrel Aircraft. The company had its headquarters in Albuquerque, New Mexico, United States.

One Aviation produced the Eclipse 550 very light jet from 2015–2018, and was developing the Eclipse 700. It was also developing the Kestrel K-350 turboprop aircraft but suspended the design in 2017 due to financial and legal challenges.

In October 2018, One Aviation filed for Chapter 11 bankruptcy while it underwent operational restructuring. However, in February 2021, it was reported that the Chapter 11 bankruptcy case was unsuccessful and had been converted to a Chapter 7 liquidation process.

== Organization ==
Alan Klapmeier, the former CEO of Kestrel, and before that, Cirrus Aircraft, was named as the first CEO of One Aviation, with former Eclipse Aerospace CEO Mason Holland as Chairman.

The company initially produced the Eclipse 550, which had been in production at Eclipse Aerospace, and intended to complete certification of the Kestrel K-350. One Aviation had a unified management and business operation along with a single supply system and marketing and sales team, but the two previous manufacturing lines continued at their then-current locations: Albuquerque, New Mexico and Chicago, Illinois for the Eclipse, and Superior, Wisconsin and Brunswick, Maine for the Kestrel.

== History ==
The merger of Eclipse and Kestrel to form the new company was announced on 15 April 2015 at the AERO Friedrichshafen aviation trade show.

In 2016, One Aviation announced that it was devoting its resources to developing an improved version of the Eclipse 550, the Eclipse 700. The company suspended the Kestrel K-350 project and in March 2017 announced that it would phase out Eclipse 550 production, to concentrate on the EA700. The first testbed for the aircraft's new wing was flown in September 2017, mounted on an existing Eclipse 500 fuselage.

In October 2017 the state of Wisconsin announced that it would commence legal action against the Kestrel Aircraft division of One Aviation for failure to repay US$4M in loans, plus more in tax benefits, given to the company since 2012 to develop the K-350. Kestrel had repaid $865,490 of the $4M but had missed all payments since November 2016. $20 million of state-backed tax credits were tied to the creation of 600 jobs for production, but only one-tenth of that number were hired and $700,000 was credited. Kestrel received $9 million in federal tax credits instead of $90 million. The state was seeking $3.6 million in payments in April 2018.

Also in October 2017, the company was evicted from its Brunswick facility after falling more than a year behind on rent and laid off workers at all four locations, a move it said was part of transitioning production from the EA550 to the EA700. At the time, One Aviation was seeking external partnerships and investment.

On April 26, 2018, the City of Albuquerque ordered One Aviation and Eclipse Aerospace to vacate leased properties at Albuquerque International Sunport or to reimburse $895,000 in back rent by May 8, secured by an Eclipse 500 prototype, then serving as the Eclipse 700 wing testbed.

On May 8, 2018, One Aviation paid $162,000 and requested a financial agreement through its restructuring but on May 16, the city refused and served a notice of eviction. One Aviation promised immediate payment of the remaining $790,000, to leave its paint and production facilities, and to continue operations from its remaining hangar. The company indicated at the time that new investors should stabilize its core business: maintenance, upgrades, and parts to the current fleet of 286 airplanes, then grow the business by restarting production of the EA550 and development the EA700. At the end of May 2018, Citiking International US LLC, incorporated in Delaware seven months prior, settled all owed back rent, with $1,081,657 paid to the city.

On October 10, 2018, One Aviation announced it had voluntarily filed for Chapter 11 bankruptcy. The company secured financing to carry on normal operations while it restructured, including support for the existing Eclipse 500/550 fleet and development of the Eclipse 700. The company did not respond to aviation media requests for whether it will continue development of the Kestrel or not.

One Aviation did not deliver any aircraft in 2018 or 2019, and had debts of nearly $200 million. A Chinese group, an investor in the company since October 2017, stepped in through Citiking International, following the Chapter 11 filing. At that point One Aviation had orders for 15 aircraft and was planning to deliver up to 50 a year by 2024. Its reorganization then included a post-Chapter 11 debt facility of $17 million. On March 9, 2020, the acquisition was cleared by the Committee on Foreign Investment in the United States of the United States Department of the Treasury for Citiking International to become the new owner of the company.

On October 22, 2020 it was announced that Citiking was "ousted from the sale process" and that a United States-based company, AML Global Eclipse LLC, owned by British businessman Christopher Harborne, intends to purchase the assets of Eclipse Aerospace for $5.25M, including the Eclipse Aircraft project. The court hearing for the sale was held in November 2020, with objections from Citiking International US being heard. The Kestrel division of the company was not included in the bid.

By the time its assets were up for sale in October 2020, Eclipse Aerospace and One Aviation combined had completed and sold a total of 33 aircraft, all of them Eclipse 550 models.

In February 2021, the bankruptcy court judge ended One Aviation's Chapter 11 reorganization effort and ordered it into Chapter 7 liquidation, saying that he had lost confidence in the company's management. AML Global will maintain support for all current Eclipse aircraft under the name Eclipse Aerospace, Inc., and Nautical Hero Group LLC has bid for assets related to the Kestrel aircraft.

== Aircraft ==
| Model name | First flight | Number built | Type |
|---|---|---|---|
| Eclipse 700 | September 2017 | 1 prototype wing design as of 2021 | Six seat, twin-engine jet |
| Eclipse 550 | March 2013 | 33 as of 2020 | Six seat, twin-engine jet |
| Kestrel K-350 | July 2006 | 1 proof-of-concept as of 2015 | Six seat, single-engine turboprop |
