= Alive in Us =

EP by Fellowship Creative
- Released: March 31, 2015
- Genres: Worship; CCM; CEDM; pop rock
- Length: 27:50
- Label: Fair Trade

Fellowship Creative chronology
Running to Follow (2014)	Alive in Us (2015)	Eclipsed (2016)

Alive in Us is an extended play from Fellowship Creative. Fair Trade Services released the EP on March 31, 2015.

== Critical reception ==
Professional ratings
Review scores
Source	Rating
365 Days of Inspiring Media	3.5/5 stars
New Release Today	4/5 stars
Worship Leader	4.5/5 stars

Awarding the EP four stars at New Release Today, Marcus Hathcock states, "Alive in Us shows us the apostolic heart of Fellowship Creative's worship ministry by giving the "capital C" Church resources to get people praising." Jay Akins, giving the EP four and a half stars from Worship Leader, writes, "Each song captures and celebrates the powerful work of grace and redemption found in the love of God." Rating the EP three and a half stars for 365 Days of Inspiring Media, Joshua Andre says, "Fellowship Creative for matching the bar that was set high, let’s hope they can match it on their full length sophomore album, or even beat it!"

== Awards and accolades ==
The song, "Jesus Is Alive", was No. 20, on the Worship Leader's Top 20 Songs of 2015 list.

== Track listing ==
No.	Title	Length
1.	"Grace on Top of Grace"	4:03
2.	"With Us"	3:36
3.	"Name of Jesus"	5:01
4.	"Jesus Is Alive"	6:09
5.	"With Us" (Acoustic)	3:36
6.	"Jesus Is Alive" (Acoustic)	5:25
Total length:		27:50

== Chart performance ==
Chart (2015)	Peak position
US Top Christian Albums (Billboard)	46
