= Running to Follow =

Studio album by Fellowship Creative
- Released: May 13, 2014
- Genre: CCM, praise & worship
- Length: 62:37
- Label: UOI/Fair Trade
- Producer: C.J. Eiriksson

Fellowship Creative chronology
Always Been about You (2013)	Running to Follow (2014)	Alive in Us (2015)

Running to Follow is the debut studio album from the American-Christian praise & worship group Fellowship Creative. This is the band's third album overall, but first with label partners Fair Trade Services. The album released on May 13, 2014, and it was produced by C.J. Eiriksson. It charted on two Billboard charts, and received a four star reviews from New Release Tuesday and a two star review by CCM Magazine.

== Background ==
This album is the follow to the commercially success second independent album by the group entitled, Always Been about You that released in 2013. This album was the band first with new label partners Fair Trade Services, and its production was handled by C.J. Eiriksson. The album released on May 13, 2014.

== Critical reception ==
Professional ratings
Review scores
Source	Rating
365 Days of Inspiring Media	4/5 stars
Alpha Omega News	A−
CCM Magazine	2/5 stars
CM Addict	5/5 stars
Cross Rhythms	10/10
New Release Tuesday	4/5 stars
Worship Leader	4.5/5 stars

Running to Follow received generally positive reception from the ratings and reviews of music critics. At New Release Tuesday, Kevin Davis rated the album four stars out of five, calling this a "solid gourmet worship album". Grace S. Aspinwall of CCM Magazine rated the album two stars out of five, indicating how the release "feels incredibly disjointed." At 365 Days of Inspiring Media, Joshua Andre rated the album four stars out of five, stating how this is "a fantastic label debut." David Bunce of CM Addict rated the album a perfect five stars, remarking how "Not only are the instruments combined to create a high quality sound in every song, but the lyrics are well thought out and beautifully written." At Alpha Omega News, Rob Snyder graded the album an A−, writing how "This is buoyant, well-produced rock/pop worship."

== Commercial performance ==
For the Billboard charting week of May 31, 2014, Running to Follow was the No. 22 most sold of the Christian Albums, and it was the No. 11 most sold in the breaking-and-entry chart of the Heatseekers Albums.

== Track listing ==
No.	Title	Length
1.	"Glory in the Highest"	3:57
2.	"Running to Follow"	3:29
3.	"Future Back"	3:58
4.	"Never Be without It"	3:35
5.	"Magnify"	4:25
6.	"Jesus My King"	5:01
7.	"Desperate for You"	4:26
8.	"Home"	4:12
9.	"Always Been about You"	3:26
10.	"The One I Need"	3:50
11.	"God of the Rescue"	4:24
12.	"The Everlasting"	4:13
13.	"Beautiful"	5:22
14.	"The Take Over (Bonus Track)"	4:05
15.	"The Everlasting Unplugged (Bonus Track)"	4:14
Total length:		62:37

== Charts ==
Chart (2014)	Peak position
US Christian Albums (Billboard)	22
US Heatseekers Albums (Billboard)	11
