= Kestrel K-350 =

Prototype single engine turboprop business aircraft

K-350
- Kestrel K-350 POC

General information
- Type: Single-engine turboprop
- Manufacturer: Farnborough Aircraft (2002–2010); Kestrel Aircraft (2010–2015); One Aviation (Kestrel division, 2015–2017)
- Status: Development suspended
- Number built: 1 proof-of-concept

History
- First flight: 29 July 2006

The Kestrel K-350 or Kestrel (previously the Kestrel JP10) is a high-performance, single engine turboprop, all-composite, six-seat aircraft.

The proof-of-concept (POC) first flew on 29 July 2006 and by April 2010, registered N352F, had logged about 260 hours. The POC uses a Pratt & Whitney PT6-67A turboprop engine flat rated to 1,000 hp (746 kW). In 2011 the company selected the Honeywell TPE331-14GR engine as first choice for the aircraft, also flat rated to approximately 1,000 hp (746 kW).

The original company, formed in 2002 to build the aircraft, was started by Richard Noble who was responsible for the team that first broke the sound barrier on land. Noble envisioned the aircraft's primary role as being part of a fleet of "air taxis" in Europe, provided as an alternative to both commercial airlines and chartered corporate jets. He named his Farnborough, England-based company "Farnborough Aircraft" and the design for the then-designated "F1" was detailed.

The company was later moved to the United States and the name changed to "Kestrel Aircraft Company", with the aircraft's designation changing from "F1" to "JP100", to "JP10", and is now the "K-350".

In April 2015 the company was merged with Eclipse Aerospace to form One Aviation, which entered a Chapter 7 bankruptcy liquidation process in February 2021.

== Design ==
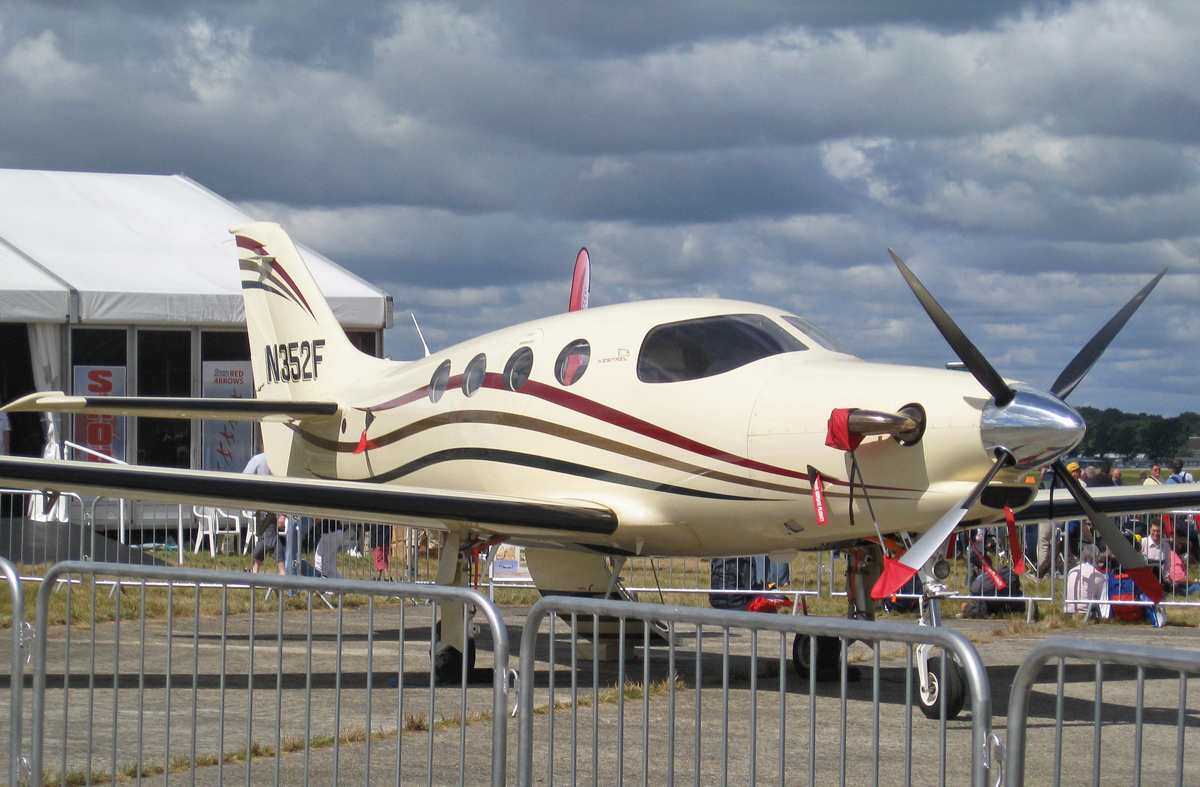
The Kestrel K-350 prototype N352F exhibited at the 2008 Farnborough International Air Show. It was then still referred to in marketing material as the Farnborough Aircraft Kestrel F1.

The design was led by Technical Director, Afandi Darlington and aerodynamicist Dr. Gordon Robinson. The aircraft's layout is low-wing with a conventional tail. The tricycle undercarriage is fully retractable. Its construction uses composites incorporating carbon fiber. The carbon-fiber composite construction is claimed to allow a lower drag shape than does all-metal construction. The wing is also of carbon-fiber construction and features a high lift laminar flow design.

The cabin features a club-seating arrangement, a toilet (or a possible seventh seat), and a baggage compartment in the pressurized area. In the cockpit, side window pillars are eliminated for a more unobstructed view for the pilot.

Farnborough Aircraft formed a business alliance with Epic Aircraft to develop both companies' aircraft and as a result the POC aircraft appears similar to the Epic LT. The wing is reportedly the same, while the Kestrel's fuselage is 20 inches longer than the Epic's. The fuselage is also slightly wider and has a 27% greater interior volume. The window and door arrangement on the left side of the aircraft is noticeably different.

== Development ==
A business partnership formed in 2006 to complete the Kestrel's development, named the Gulf Aircraft Partnership and located in the UAE, did not proceed.

In 2009 Farnborough Aircraft director Adrian Norris reported that the company was ready to freeze the design and build conformal prototypes as part of the effort to seek FAR Part 23 certification.

In early 2010 a business relationship was formed with Liberty Aerospace of Melbourne, Florida, United States to provide assistance with Toray carbon fiber components.

In July 2010, Alan Klapmeier, co-founder of Cirrus Design Corporation, joined with Anthony Galley and others in the renamed Kestrel Aircraft Company. The wing is to be redesigned to improve stall characteristics and ease of construction, most likely eliminating the wing's planform elliptical leading edge.

On 23 July 2010 Kestrel Aircraft announced that they will be relocating from Farnborough, Hampshire, England, to large, relatively newly built hangars at the soon-to-be-closed Brunswick Naval Air Station in Brunswick, Maine, United States. The company will receive some local financial assistance in exchange for an anticipated eventual creation of some 300 jobs. On January 17, 2012, it was announced that the aircraft will be produced in Superior, Wisconsin due to tax incentives totalling US$50 million, and that a smaller workforce would remain in Brunswick creating composite components for the aircraft.

In July 2013 it was announced that the aircraft would be equipped with the Garmin G3000 avionics suite. Kestrel CEO Alan Klapmeier also stated that funding delays had slowed progress on the aircraft and that a conforming prototype was now expected to be ready in the summer of 2014, with the first customer delivery forecast for the end of 2015 or early 2016. Type certification costs were estimated at US$175M, with US$50M already spent.

By September 2013 employees were reporting that the company was short of money and that salaries and insurance payments were missing or late, and that vendors had not been paid. The company indicated that development had been delayed due to lack of investment and that the first flight of a production aircraft would not occur in 2014.

In early 2014 it was reported that Kestrel Aircraft had fallen months behind on loan payments to the Wisconsin Economic Development Corporation (WEDC) due to financing delays. It was also reported that the delay in financing had impacted hiring, causing the company to reduce its staff in Superior. The WEDC and Kestrel agreed upon new terms that would defer the payments until November 2014. As of July 2014, some finance had come in and employment grew at its Brunswick Landing facility, but the total amount of $100 million had not been reached.

In October 2017 the state of Wisconsin announced that it was commencing legal action against the Kestrel division of One Aviation for failure to repay US$4M in loans given to it in 2012, plus more in tax benefits. Kestrel has repaid $865,490 of the $4M but has missed all payments since November 2016. Kestrel was also evicted from its facility in Maine after falling more than a year behind on rent. One Aviation CEO Alan Klapmeier told AIN Online that development of the Kestrel K-350 "had been shelved" while the company focuses on other aircraft projects.

In October 2018, One Aviation announced it had voluntarily filed for Chapter 11 bankruptcy.

On March 9, 2020, clearance was obtained from the United States Department of the Treasury's Committee on Foreign Investment in the United States to allow Chinese company Citiking International to acquire the company from bankruptcy. However, in February 2021, it was reported that those efforts were ultimately unsuccessful and that the company's Chapter 11 reorganization case had been converted to a Chapter 7 bankruptcy liquidation process, with United States-based company Nautical Hero Group LLC bidding for assets related to the Kestrel.

== Specifications (K-350) ==
Data from manufacturer

General characteristics

- Crew: one
- Capacity: seven
- Length: 38.5 ft (11.7 m)
- Wingspan: 45.0 ft (13.7 m)
- Height: 12.8 ft (3.9 m)
- Empty weight: 5,200 lb (2,359 kg)
- Gross weight: 8,552 lb (3,879 kg)
- Powerplant: 1 × Honeywell TPE331-14GR turboprop, 1,650 hp (1,230 kW) flat rated to 1,000 hp (746 kW)
- Propellers: 4-bladed Hartzell Propeller, constant speed

Performance

- Range: 1,125 nmi (1,295 mi, 2,084 km)
- Service ceiling: 31,000 ft (9,400 m)
- Rate of climb: 2,250 ft/min (11.4 m/s)

== See also ==
- Epic LT
- Extra EA-500
- Pilatus PC-12
- Piper Meridian
- SOCATA TB family
- Beechcraft Bonanza with turbine powerplant upgrades
