= Eclipse 550 =

Very light business jet

550
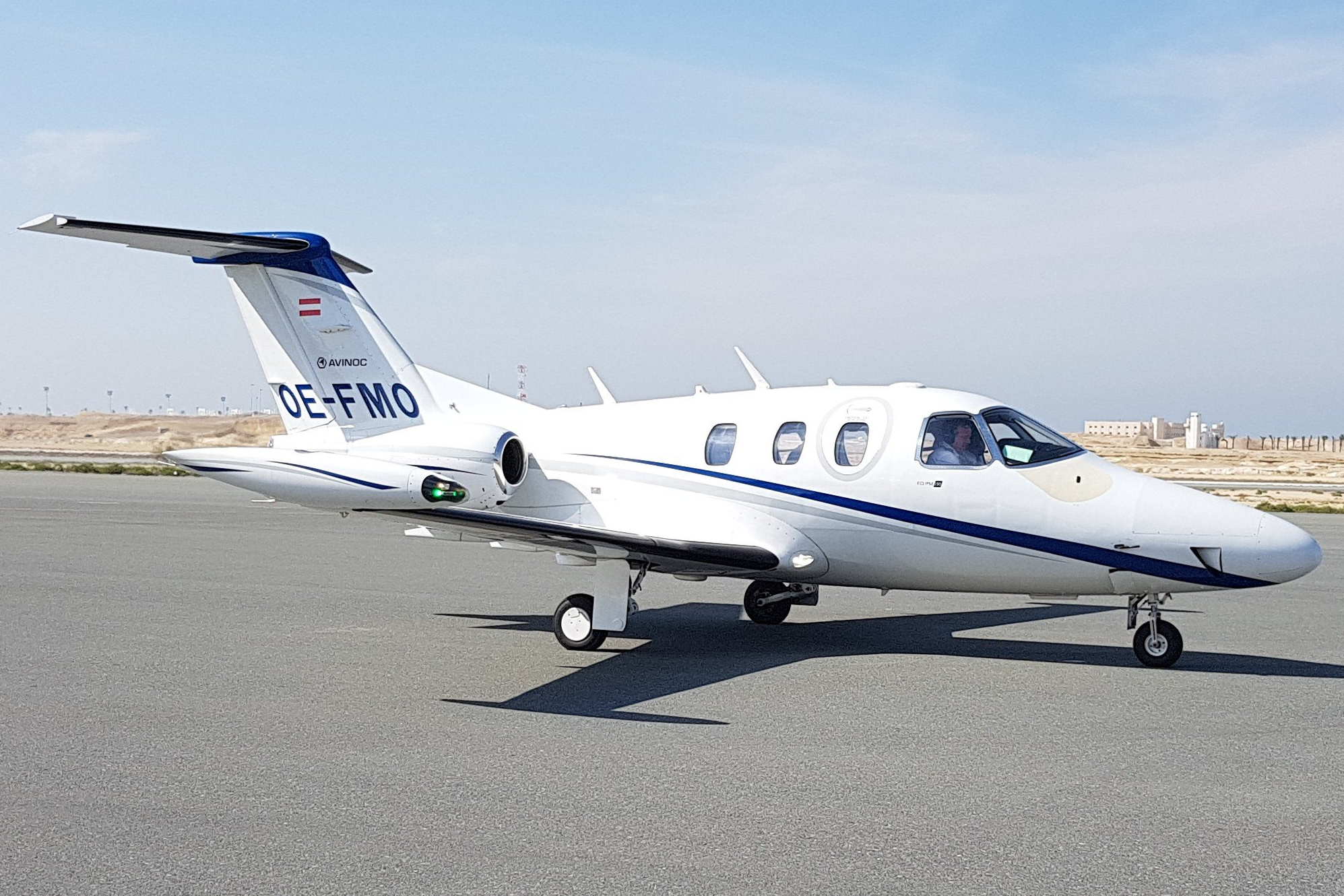
- The Eclipse 550 is a small business jet with twin aft-mounted turbofans and tip tanks

General information
- Type: Very light jet
- National origin: United States
- Manufacturer: Eclipse Aerospace (2009–2015); One Aviation (Eclipse division, 2015–2018); Eclipse Aerospace, Inc. (2021–present)
- Status: In production
- Number built: 35 through 2023

History
- Manufactured: March 2014–2017, May 2023–present
- Developed from: Eclipse 500

The Eclipse 550 is a very light jet initially built by Eclipse Aerospace and later One Aviation of Albuquerque, New Mexico, United States. The aircraft is a development version of the Eclipse 500, which was produced by predecessor Eclipse Aviation. Like the 500, the 550 is a low-wing, six seat, twin engine jet-powered aircraft. The Eclipse 550 is certified for single-pilot operation.

The aircraft was announced at the National Business Aviation Association convention in Las Vegas, Nevada, in October 2011. The first example was rolled out in March 2013 and the first customer delivery was on 22 October 2013.

In March 2017, the company announced that 550 production would end after four more aircraft were completed, to concentrate production on the new Eclipse 700 model of the aircraft.

In February 2021, One Aviation entered a Chapter 7 bankruptcy liquidation process, and in 2023, after its Eclipse assets were purchased by a new company, 550 production resumed with two deliveries that year.

== Development ==
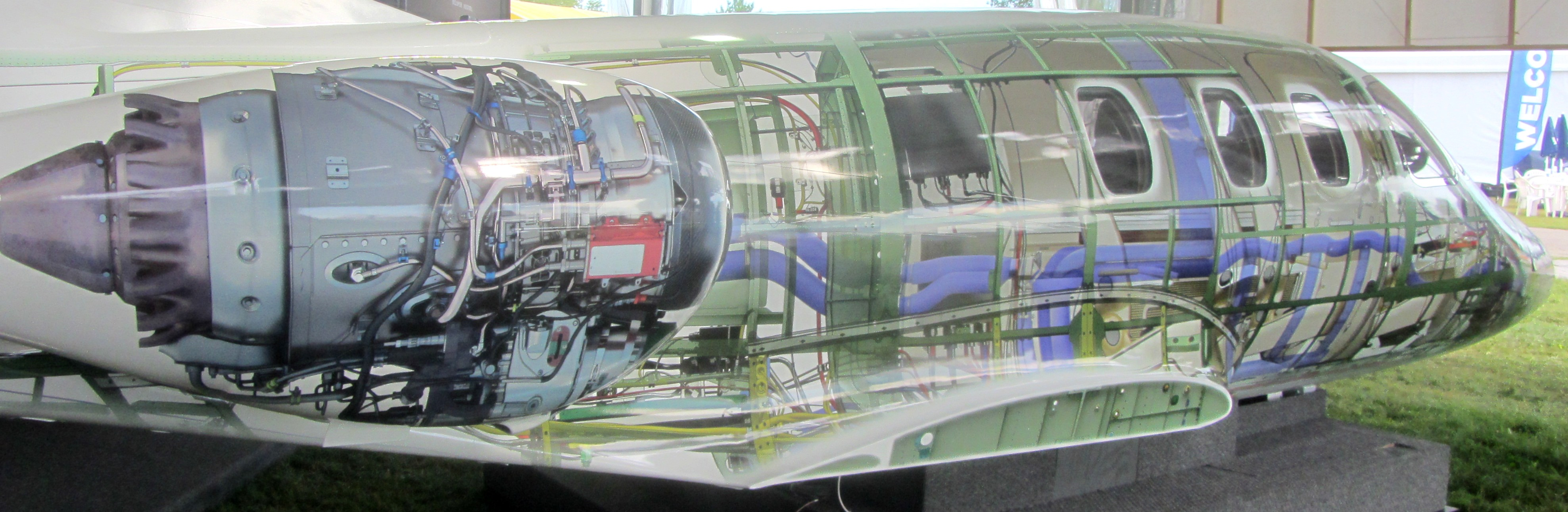
One Aviation Eclipse 550 Mockup with systems graphics

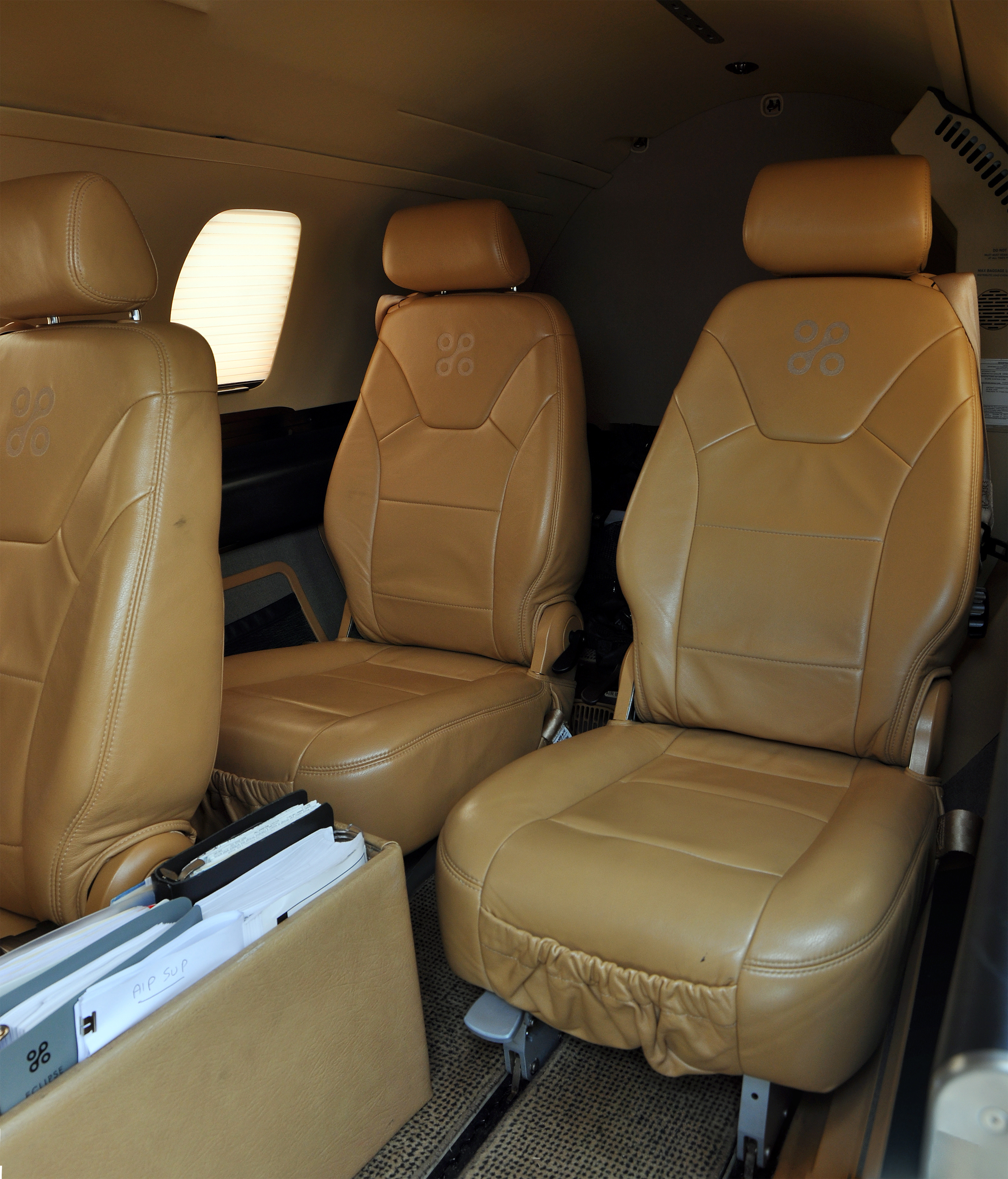
Two-abreast cabin

The 550 was developed from the earlier Eclipse 500, enabled by Sikorsky Aircraft's investment in Eclipse Aerospace in 2010. It retains the 500's airframe and PW610F engines, but incorporates an improved avionics package, including satellite phones, autothrottles, synthetic vision and enhanced vision systems, as well as anti-skid brakes.

In May 2012, the company signed a deal with Sikorsky subsidiary PZL Mielec to have the Polish company build the Eclipse 550 fuselage, empennage and wings, while final aircraft assembly will be carried out by Eclipse Aerospace at their Albuquerque, New Mexico, plant.

The initial price for the 550 in 2011 was US$2.695M and production was intended at that time to be 50–100 aircraft per year. The aircraft achieved an FAA production certificate in April 2012.

In June 2013, the FAA approved the Eclipse 550 for a fatigue limit of 20,000 hours or 20,000 cycles with an unlimited calendar life. In August 2013, it was announced that the aircraft would incorporate autothrottles, new EFIS software, an anti-lock braking system and a high-resolution 3.25" x 4.3" standby display.

In February 2014, the FAA approved autothrottles and anti-skid brakes for the 550. The manufacturer claims the new braking system will stop the aircraft in 700 ft (213 m) from normal landing speeds.

The first customer delivery of a 550 was completed on 12 March 2014, and 10 had been delivered by August. However, sales had been slow, and employees were laid off.

One Aviation received EASA certification for its Eclipse 550 on 18 November 2015, clearing the way for sales of the light twinjet in the European Union and its use for air-taxi service there. The company has deposits from half a dozen European customers awaiting delivery pending certification. Deliveries were to begin in January 2016, according to Cary Winter, One Aviation's executive vice president. The only changes required from U.S. production models are to “paint a couple of switches red and change the connector on the door switch,” he said.

In March 2017 the company announced that 550 production would end in favour of production of the new "Canada" model of the aircraft. However, after One Aviation's Eclipse assets were purchased in a Chapter 7 bankruptcy liquidation process, 550 production resumed in 2023 with two deliveries made that year.

=== Eclipse 700 ===
Eclipse 700 rendering, showing larger wing roots and stretched fuselage with additional window

One Aviation designed an improved $3.495 million "Project Canada" variant that was planned to have its first flight in 2017. A new wing root section would lengthen its span by 3.8 ft (1.2 m) to 41.7 ft (12.7 m), which would increase the wing area to 163 sq ft (15.1 m^{2}), 13% more, and eliminate the tip tanks to reduce drag. 70 US gal (260 L) more fuel could be carried to reach 321 US gal (1,220 L), and a higher MTOW would increase the useful load to 2,787 lb (1,264 kg), 476 lb (216 kg) more. It was initially intended to use flat rated Pratt & Whitney Canada PW615 engines of 1,170 lbf (5.2 kN) of thrust. NBAA IFR range would improve to 1,400 nmi (2,600 km), and it would cruise at Mach 0.65 (373 kn) at a higher ceiling of 43,000 ft (13,000 m). It would have similar takeoff, approach and landing speeds but would need 24% less runway at takeoff at sea level and ISA+25 and time to climb to FL400 at ISA+10 would be halved. An installed Garmin G3000 avionics suite included synthetic vision, GFC 700 autopilot, Garmin ESP protection system, LNAV and VNAV, and is ADS-B and RVSM compliant.

In June 2017 it was announced the design would fit Williams FJ33 turbofans instead of the PW615s, derated to 1,200 lbf (5.3 kN) from 1,900 lbf (8.5 kN). This selection followed the possible end of the PW615 production as a backlog of already developed PW610s components for the Eclipse 500 was consumed, and the possibility of restarting the production line at a low rate and for a short time was uncertain. The production of the 550 was projected to be interrupted as early as 2017, leaving a gap until "Project Canada" reached market, which was initially forecast for late 2018 or early 2019, but which was not met.

It is intended that "Project Canada" would eventually be designated as the Eclipse EA700, but it required an additional investment of US$50 million to complete the development. It was intended to compete with similar light business jets like the HondaJet and the Embraer Phenom 100 and also with high-speed single turboprops such as the Daher TBM 930/910.

The EA700's fuselage was stretched by 14 in (36 cm) and its horizontal stabilizer had a greater span. The FJ33 engines provided better hot and high performance with a 75 kn (139 km/h) higher speed and a range of 1,470 nmi (2,720 km). In 2017 it was forecast that the aircraft would be priced at $3.6 million and by July 2017 had received 30 orders, mostly from current owners, who would benefit from a trade-in program. Certification was expected between January and July 2019, provided that One Aviation secured sufficient investment.

Three prototypes were planned: the first, presented in August 2017 and developed from an Eclipse 500, sported an aerodynamically conforming wing and the next, also based on an existing plane, would test the FJ33. The EA700 wing was first flown on an existing fuselage in September 2017.

On October 10, 2018, One Aviation announced it had voluntarily filed for Chapter 11 bankruptcy. Citiking International, a Chinese-supported company, acquired the company; and the acquisition was cleared on March 9, 2020. However, in February 2021, it was reported that those efforts were ultimately unsuccessful and that the company's Chapter 11 reorganization case had been converted to a Chapter 7 bankruptcy liquidation process, with United States-based company AML Global Eclipse LLC maintaining support for all current Eclipse aircraft under the name Eclipse Aerospace, Inc.

== Operational history ==
In 2013, Eclipse planned to submit the 550 for the USAF's very light jet requirement, even though that requirement specified FAR Part 25 certification and the 550 is certified to the less-stringent Part 23.

== Specifications (550) ==
Data from Eclipse Aerospace

General characteristics

- Crew: 1 or 2
- Capacity: 4–5 passengers
- Length: 33.5 ft (10.2 m)
- Wingspan: 37.9 ft (11.6 m)
- Height: 11 ft (3.4 m)
- Empty weight: 3,634 lb (1,648 kg)
- Gross weight: 6,034 lb (2,737 kg)
- Max takeoff weight: 6,000 lb (2,722 kg)
- Fuel capacity: 251 gal
- Powerplant: 2 × Pratt & Whitney Canada PW610F turbofan, 900 lbf (4.0 kN) thrust each

Performance

- Maximum speed: 432 mph (694 km/h, 375 kn)
- Range: 1,295 mi (2,084 km, 1,125 nmi)
- Service ceiling: 41,000 ft (12,000 m)
- Rate of climb: 3,456 ft/min (17.56 m/s)

Avionics

- Autothrottles
- Automatic Direction Finder (ADF)
- Avio dual Integrated Flight Management Systems
- Distance Measuring Equipment (DME)
- Enhanced vision system
- Radar Altimeter
- Stormscope
- Synthetic vision
- Terrain awareness and warning system
- Traffic collision avoidance system
- Weather radar

== See also ==
Aircraft of comparable role, configuration, and era

- Adam A700
- Cessna Citation Mustang
- Cirrus Vision SF50
- Diamond D-Jet
- Embraer Phenom 100
- Honda HA-420 HondaJet
- Piper PA-47 PiperJet
- Stratos 714

Related lists

- List of very light jets
