= Total Eclipse (American band) =

American metal band from San Francisco, California

- Origin: San Francisco, California
- Genre: Heavy metal
- Years active: 1996–2004, 2007–present
- Labels: Limb Music, independent
- Members: Andy Dracons Giardina on Vox/lead guitar Maurizio Giacchi (Keyboard/ guitar); Luciano Mancini on Bass
- Past members: Erik Cameron; Chris Cameron; Ramon Ochoa; Owen Hart
- Website: Totaleclipse1.bandcamp.com

Total Eclipse is an American metal band from San Francisco, California, with a self-produced mini-CD released internationally (Guardians of Metal, 1999), a worldwide album (Ashes of Eden, Limb Music, 2003) released under a major record label, Spellcaster (Independent, 2009) Kukulkan in 2013. In 2021, the band released an album, Enemy Enemy, independently. In 2025 the band issued the remastered version of Kukulcan (September 2025) and the live compilation The Live Metal Project (December 2025). https://totaleclipse2.bandcamp.com/album/kukulcan-remastered In October 2026, Total Eclipse released the album ''Dracons''.

== History ==
In 1996, Erik Cameron and his brother, Chris, formed the band Total Eclipse. After a search for musicians who shared their passion, they met drummer Ramon Ochoa in 1998. As a teenager, Ramon had already served as drummer for several local acts. A short time later, experienced bass player Owen Hart joined the band. The line-up was completed in January 1999 by singer Andy Dracons Giardina who had already gained notoriety in his native Italy before moving to the United States to finish his academic studies and advance his musical career.

Within a year they had enough material for a demo. Their EP Guardians of Metal was released internationally in 1999.

Encouraged by the demo's success, Total Eclipse contacted the German producer Uwe Lulis and soon signed a deal with Limb Music; the album Ashes of Eden was released worldwide to much critical acclaim. Piet Sielck was also involved in the mixing and production of the album.

In 2004, the original line-up disintegrated following a decision made by the Cameron Brothers to pursue a different musical direction. After parting ways with Limb Music, and having legally acquired the name of the band, Giardina decided to find another label to release their new second album, Spellcaster, also produced by Uwe Lulis, recorded in the Bay Area and near the Black Forest in Germany, then remastered in 2007- 2008 in San Francisco. The music is an expansion of the sound of the Ashes of Eden album and the Guardians of Metal demo.

In October 2007, Andy Dracons Giardina decided to resurrect Total Eclipse after a four-year hiatus from the scene, and simultaneously release the long-awaited second LP Spellcaster. After many hardships, including a short-lived reformed line-up, the quest to fulfill the reincarnation of Total Eclipse continued and, in 2008, the band found Brian Davy as its new drummer for the second line-up.

In March 2009, Total Eclipse entered Faultline Studios in San Francisco to begin the recording of the third LP with the new line-up. This album, titled Kulkukan, was released in 2012. This work represents yet another phase in the evolution of style and sound of the band. With the album recording complete, the band is setting up a full lineup, and will be planning subsequent touring to support the release.

In 2010, Total Eclipse joined metal band Imagika on a US tour which ran for several weeks, and was booked by Distilled Entertainment.

In July 2013, Total Eclipse was rejoined by guitarist Dan Gorman, and the band began rehearsing material and setting plans to move forward.

After his return to Italy, Andy Giardina started to work on the album Enemy, Enemywith a new line up composed of Lucio Mancini (Bass), Maurizio Giacchi (Guitar and Keyboards), Andy Dracons Giardina (Vocals and Guitar). It was released on March 22, 2021. In 2025 Total Eclipse continued its independent activity with two new releases. The remastered edition of the 2013 album Kukulcan, featuring updated production and the original track listing, was released on 30 September 2025. This was followed on 17 December 2025 by The Live Metal Project, a double-length live album compiling recordings spanning from the late 1990s through 2021, including previously unreleased demo material. https://totaleclipse2.bandcamp.com/album/the-live-metal-project In October 2026 Giardina released a new Total Eclipse Album, 'Dracons'.
