= Eclipse (Sebastian) =

2000 sculpture by Jill Sebastian

- Artist: Jill Sebastian
- Year: 2000
- Location: Lake Bluff Terrace, Milwaukee; 43°2′50.386″N 87°53′41.564″W

Jill Sebastian's Eclipse is located at Lake Bluff Terrace, Milwaukee, Wisconsin 2000. with stairs leading to it off the lakefront. It is a collaborative piece made out of vitreous glass and stone mosaic over concrete, bronze. The dimensions are 10’ x 10’ x 10'. Made in 2003, this sculpture is still in very good condition.

== Artist information ==
Jill Sebastian got her inspiration at a young age when she saw a woman painting a mural depicting labor strikes. She attended several colleges and got her MFA at UW Milwaukee in 1979. She is currently working on a project for the University of Wisconsin–Madison, building a new South Campus Union. She is also a professor of sculpture at the Milwaukee Institute of Art & Design (MIAD).
