= Eclipsed (album) =

Studio album by Fellowship Creative
- Released: January 29, 2016
- Genre: Worship
- Length: 50:56
- Label: Fair Trade, Columbia

Fellowship Creative chronology
Alive in Us (2015)	Eclipsed (2016)

Eclipsed is the second studio album by Fellowship Creative. Fair Trade Services and Columbia Records released the album on January 29, 2016.

== Critical reception ==
Professional ratings
Review scores
Source	Rating
365 Days of Inspiring Media	4/5 stars
CCM Magazine	4/5 stars
New Release Today	4.5/5 stars
Worship Leader	4.5/5 stars

Matt Conner, allotting the album a four star review for CCM Magazine, says, "Eclipsed finds the talented worship collective singing confidently on uplifting tracks...However the album gets better when it creates a reflective atmosphere...which provides a beautiful soundtrack for the liminal spaces in which we often find ourselves...Several tracks follow suit in this darker wheelhouse, and it's ironically here they shine brightest musically." Barry Westman, allocating the album a four and a half star review at Worship Leader, describes, "The production quality, depth of lyrics, strong vocals, variety of styles, and overall sound make Eclipse so enjoyable to listen to and provide the church with a new collection of powerful songs."

Awarding the album four and a half stars from New Release Today, Marcus Hathcock states, "Toeing the line between electronically driven pop and guitar-propelled rock worship, Eclipsed takes the best of all worlds for a nearly perfect modern worship album that pushes the movement forward...Say goodbye to formulas and [clichés], and hello to authentic, artistic expression to the Lord." Joshua Andre, giving the album four stars at 365 Days of Inspiring Media, writes, "Eclipsed continues to further tighten the group’s refreshing sound, and also has me applaud Fair Trade Services for signing the group in the first place; I definitely look forward to new material from this musically diverse and genre diverse band of sisters and brothers in Christ!"

== Track listing ==
Eclipsed track listing
No.	Title	Length
1.	"The Moment"	3:54
2.	"Grace on Top of Grace"	3:25
3.	"Jesus Our Hope"	3:33
4.	"Stars"	4:35
5.	"Jesus Is Alive"	5:39
6.	"Never Giving Up"	5:10
7.	"Caution to the Wind"	3:38
8.	"No Escape"	4:20
9.	"Lead Me"	4:44
10.	"Eclipsed"	4:21
11.	"Holding onto You"	7:37
Total length:		50:56

== Chart performance ==
Chart (2016)	Peak position
US Top Christian Albums (Billboard)	24
US Heatseekers Albums (Billboard)	21
