= Eclipse (board game) =

Strategy board game

New Dawn for the Galaxy
- Designers: Touko Tahkokallio
- Illustrators: Ossi Hiekkala; Sampo Sikiö
- Publishers: Lautapelit.fi
- Publication: 2011
- Genres: Strategy
- Languages: English
- Players: 2–6 (up to 9 with the Rise of the Ancients expansion.)
- Playing time: 2–3 hours
- Age range: 14+
- Website: Lautapelit.fi: Eclipse

Eclipse: New Dawn for the Galaxy (commonly known as Eclipse) is a strategy board game produced by Lautapelit.fi. It was designed by Touko Tahkokallio and first released in 2011. The game currently has three expansions – Rise of the Ancients, released in 2012, Ship Pack One, released in 2013 and Shadow of the Rift, released in 2015 – and four mini expansions. A second edition, titled Eclipse: Second Dawn for the Galaxy was released in 2020 featuring revisions to the rules, graphic design, miniatures, and storage. The first edition is no longer being actively published.

== Gameplay ==
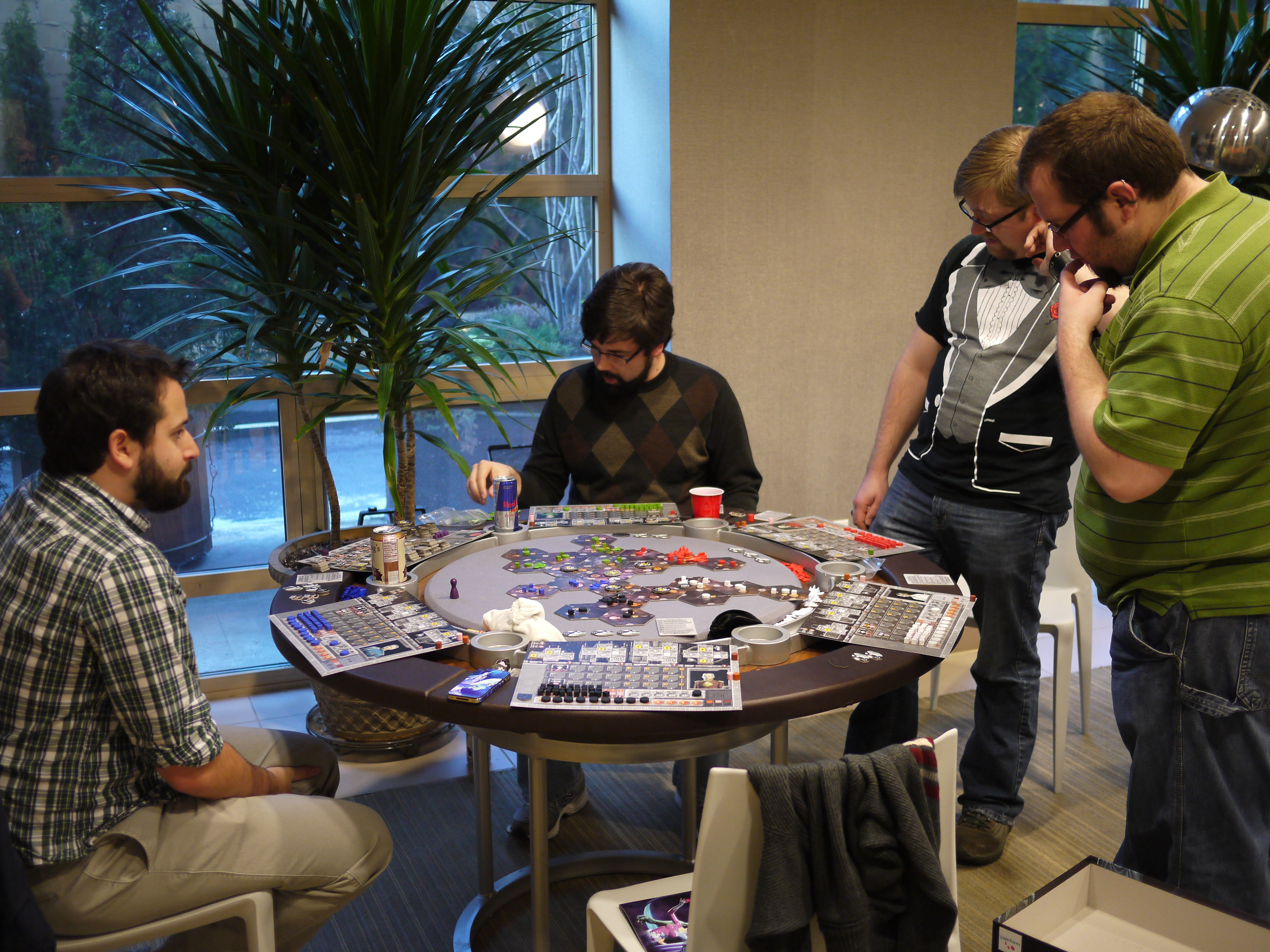
A game of Eclipse in progress

Eclipse is a 4X strategy game where you must lead your civilisation to prevail over the others. Players can choose to play as either a human or alien civilization. On each move, a player takes one of six actions: building, exploring, influencing, moving, researching or upgrading. For example, exploring opens up a new tile in a direction chosen by the exploring player. Each action uses resources (money, materials or science), and resource management is a key part of gameplay.

The galaxy is laid out in three rings of hex tiles, most of which get laid during exploration. At the start of play, only the galaxy center tile and tiles for the players' respective home stars are laid. When exploring, a player chooses a tileless space which is accessible from a star the player occupies. The player then draws a new hex tile from a stack of face-down tiles and lays it in the chosen direction. The player may strategically choose which orientation the tile takes, to create links to existing tiles or to block access by other players.

== Honors and awards ==
Eclipse has received the following honors and awards:

- Charles S. Roberts Best Science-Fiction or Fantasy Board Wargame Nominee (2011)
- Jogo do Ano Nominee (2011)
- Golden Geek Best Board Game Artwork/Presentation Nominee (2012)
- Golden Geek Best Innovative Board Game Nominee (2012)
- Golden Geek Best Strategy Board Game Nominee (2012)
- Golden Geek Best Thematic Board Game Nominee (2012)
- Golden Geek Best Wargame Nominee (2012)
- Golden Geek Board Game of the Year Winner (2012)
- Golden Geek Golden Geek Best Strategy Board Game Winner (2012)
- International Gamers Award – General Strategy: Multi-player Nominee
- JoTa Best Gamer Game Audience Award (2012)
- JoTa Best Gamer Game Nominee (2012)
- JUG Game of the Year Winner (2012)
- Ludoteca Ideale Winner (2012)
- Lys Passioné Finalist (2012)
- Lys Passioné Winner (2012)
- Tric Trac Nominee (2012)

== Reception ==
In a review of Eclipse in Black Gate, John ONeill said "There's more to the game than just cruel matriarchal domination and deep-space explosions. Maybe. I assume so based on the components listed on the back, anyway. I haven't been able to bring myself to open the box (I have a problem with shrinkwrap. Don't ask)." M Harold Page for Black Gate said "It's worth saying a word about the playability. The designers have cunningly made the player's board the hub for all those otherwise annoying end-of-round resource calculations."

== Video game ==
The adaptation of the board game, Eclipse: New Dawn for the Galaxy, is a 4X video game developed by the Polish game company Big Daddy's Creations. It was released for iOS in 2013 and later ported to Microsoft Windows in 2016. The players take control of one of the races with the main goal of building an empire during a span of nine rounds. According to Metacritic, the game was received with "generally favorable" reviews and an average score of 87/100.
