= The Eclipse (James Fenimore Cooper) =

Autobiographical vignette by James Fenimore Cooper

The Eclipse is an autobiographical vignette by James Fenimore Cooper that was written between 1833 and 1838, recounting his own experience witnessing a total solar eclipse in Cooperstown on the morning of June 16, 1806. It was published posthumously in the September 1869 issue of Putnam's Monthly Magazine. Susan Fenimore Cooper, the author's daughter, found it among his papers.
