= Eclipse Aerospace =

American aircraft manufacturer

- Company type: Private company
- Industry: Aerospace
- Predecessor: Eclipse Aviation
- Founded: 2009
- Founders: Mason Holland & Mike Press
- Fate: Merged with Kestrel Aircraft in April 2015
- Successor: One Aviation
- Headquarters: Albuquerque, New Mexico, United States
- Services: Maintenance and upgrades to Eclipse 500 aircraft Manufacturer of the Eclipse 550
- Number of employees: 60 (as of 27 December 2009)
- Website: Archives

Eclipse Aerospace was an American aircraft manufacturer, maintenance and upgrade company. The company provided maintenance and upgrades to the Eclipse 500 fleet and was the manufacturer of the Eclipse 550. The company was formed specifically to purchase the assets of bankrupt Eclipse Aviation, for which it paid US$20 million in cash and US$20 million in promissory notes in August 2009.

In April 2015, the company was merged with Kestrel Aircraft to form One Aviation. In February 2021, One Aviation entered a Chapter 7 liquidation process.

== History ==
2009

Eclipse Aviation, the Albuquerque, New Mexico-based manufacturer of the Eclipse 500 very light jet and the company that was developing the Eclipse 400 single-engine jet, was founded in 1998 by former tech industry executive Vern Raburn and entered bankruptcy on 25 November 2008. Initially Eclipse Aviation entered Chapter 11 bankruptcy, but when the sale of the company to its largest shareholder failed it was forced into Chapter 7 liquidation instead.

On 31 July 2009 Jeoffrey L. Burtch, the appointed Chapter 7 Trustee, filed a motion requesting the court's approval to sell the assets of Eclipse Aviation to Eclipse Aerospace a new company headed by Mike Press and Mason Holland, initially based in Charleston, South Carolina. The court-filed documents indicated that the assets would be sold for US$20 million in cash and $20 million in new notes, subject to other offers coming forth at an auction. The filing stated that if the directed sale to Eclipse Aerospace was not completed due to the auction proceeding, then Eclipse Aerospace would receive a US$1.6 million "Break-Up Fee" instead. The trustee indicated to the court that he felt that this measure was justified to encourage movement towards an auction. He stated that 30 organizations had expressed interest in the assets, 12 had signed non-disclosure agreements and received complete information and six had completed tours of the Eclipse facilities, "however, prospective purchasers were either hesitant to make the first public bid, were unable to obtain financing, required unacceptable conditions to closing, or otherwise backed out." Without approval to pay for a bid and hopefully create an action, Burtch indicated that he would "most likely be forced to abandon or liquidate the Eclipse Assets on a piece meal basis."

The Chapter 7 sale hearing was heard in federal bankruptcy court on 20 August 2009, with Eclipse Aerospace as the sole and winning bidder. A previous bid by the Eclipse Owners Group was withdrawn and their support given to Eclipse Aerospace. Other parties that had previously expressed interest, including Daher-Socata, also did not submit bids. Eclipse Aerospace indicated at the time that they intended to retain the company in Albuquerque, provide upgrades to the current Eclipse fleet and assess whether production can be restarted at some future point.

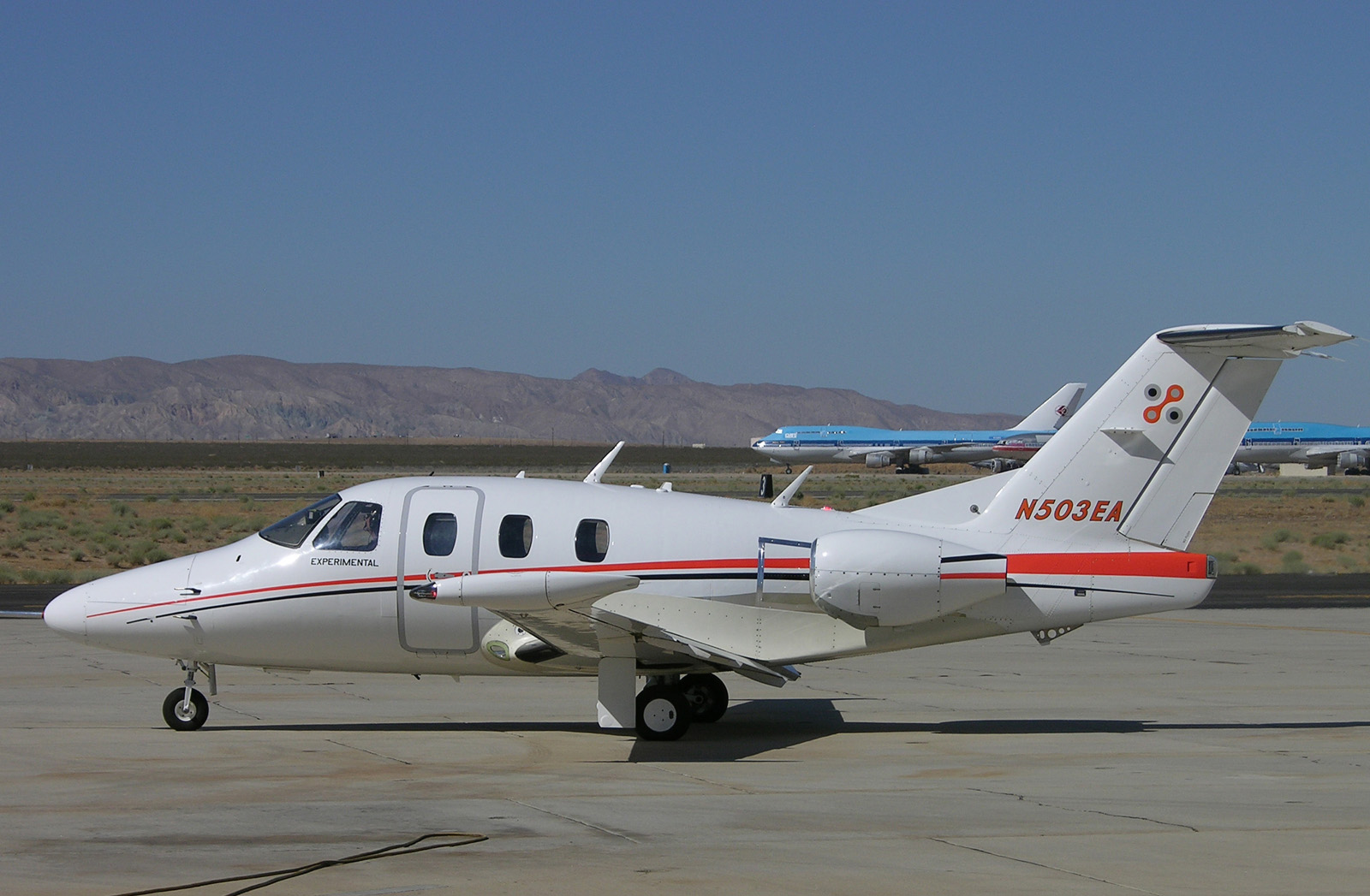
Eclipse 500

Eclipse Aerospace opened for business in the old Eclipse Aviation facilities in Albuquerque, New Mexico on 1 September 2009, with 15 employees and was given the US Eclipse 500 type certificate by the Federal Aviation Administration on 30 September 2009. Prior to Eclipse Aerospace's acquisition of the Eclipse 500 type certificate, the European Aviation Safety Agency (EASA) had suspended the European type certificate, without giving a reason for the action. On 28 October 2009, EASA changed the name of the holder on the type certificate to Eclipse Aerospace, but did not reinstate it.

In October 2009 the company announced it would start offering upgrades for the Flight Into Known Icing and the AvioNG 1.5 avionics packages for existing aircraft. The upgrades will only be available together at a cost of US$149,000.

The company called a meeting of Eclipse parts suppliers for 27 October 2009 in Albuquerque, with the aim of clarifying the future availability of parts. Concurrent with that announcement was the indication that a decision about restarting Eclipse 500 production will not be made before the spring of 2010. Eclipse Aerospace confirmed that it will operate service centers at both Albuquerque International Sunport and Chicago Executive Airport. As of October 2009 maintenance work has only been conducted at the Chicago facility, but the company has confirmed its commitment to retaining the Albuquerque location.

By December 2009 the company was engaged in completing upgrades on the 28 ex-DayJet Eclipse 500s that has been acquired as part of the original asset purchase, with the aim of making them available for sale in spring 2010. They were also modifying eight customer 500s with upgraded avionics and de-icing systems. The company had also secured FAA approval for a new aircraft type training program using actual aircraft in place of simulator-based training. The aircraft type certificate specifies minimum training requirements.

In late December 2009 the company had 60 employees with 48 in Albuquerque and 12 in Chicago.

2010

In March 2010 the company began offering refurbished EA500s under the brand name Total Eclipse. Company president Mason Holland explained: "In their rush to deliver the aircraft, the former manufacturer of the EA500 [Eclipse Aviation Corporation] delivered to owners an aircraft that was only about 85 percent complete. These aircraft were great performers, but still lacked several important features. We now have completed the design and engineering of the EA500." The used airframes now feature GPS-coupled autopilots and the Flight Into Known Icing equipment package and retail for US$2.15M. Total Eclipse twin-engine jets feature full certification to fly to FL410, the Avio Integrated Flight Management System, and a full aircraft warranty.

At AirVenture 2010, on 29 July 2010 company President Mason Holland announced that they had upgraded 40% of the existing Eclipse fleet and had their service centres in Chicago, Boca Raton, Nevada and Albuquerque operational. The company was also engaged in developing further improvements for the aircraft including new cabin entertainment and communication systems.

In September 2010 the company applied to the FAA to raise the certified ceiling on the EA500 from Flight Level 370 to Flight Level 410 on the basis of the installation of a maintenance-free thin carbon strip mounted on the windshield and the aircraft structure to dissipate potential precipitation static. The modification replaces the previous difficult to apply and maintenance intensive chemical solution previously used. The aircraft was initially intended to have a FL410 ceiling.

At the National Business Aviation Association convention in October 2010 Sikorsky Aircraft announced that it would invest in Eclipse Aerospace. Sikorsky VP Mark Cherry explained: "This agreement in principle affords us an opportunity to invest in a great product and to further leverage our strong aftermarket and product support capabilities for fixed-wing application". Sikorsky President Jeff Pino owned and flew an Eclipse 500 and regarded it highly. The deal was completed by the end of January 2011, with Sikorsky buying an undisclosed equity share in Eclipse. Sikorsky will also provide Eclipse with access to its supply and parts distribution system, as well as engineering support.

In December 2010 CEO Mason Holland confirmed that the company still plans to return the Eclipse 500 to production as soon as the market for personal jets improves and the company acquires additional investment.

2011

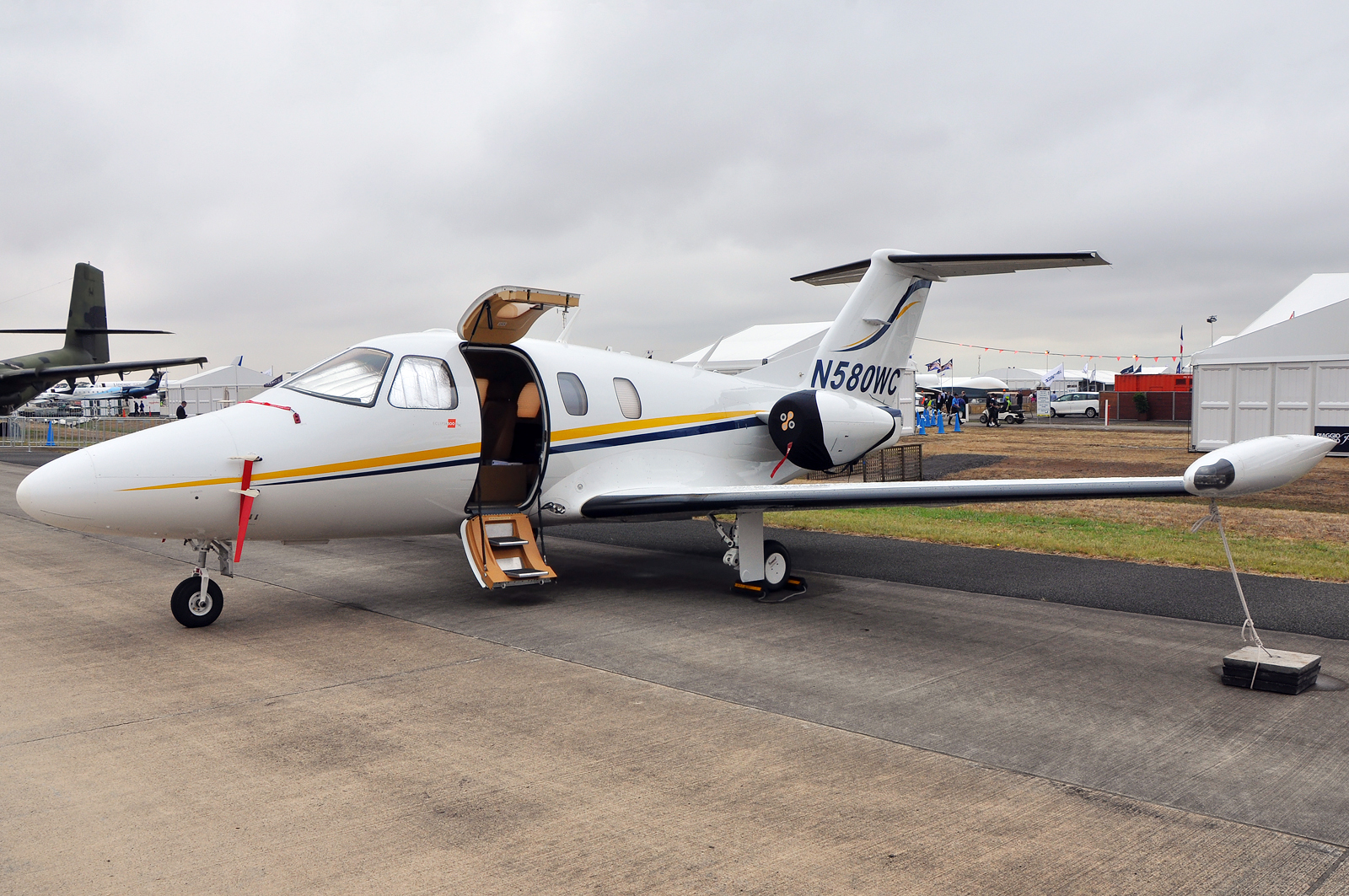
Eclipse 550 with cabin door open

In March 2011 at Sun 'n Fun the company announced that they had been awarded a Supplemental Type Certificate to install the Avio Integrated Flight Management System developed by Innovative Solutions & Support in the Eclipse 500. The new system provides system navigation and allows coupled localizer performance with vertical guidance approaches, holds and procedure turns as well as en route navigation.

In October 2011 at the National Business Aviation Association convention the company announced that it would commence production of an improved model of the Eclipse 500 to be called the Eclipse 550, with deliveries expected in 2013.

2012

In April 2012 Greg Hayes, CFO of United Technologies, which owns Sikorsky, indicated that Sikorsky would not be investing any more money in Eclipse. Eclipse CEO Mason Holland quickly clarified that the company had not asked for any further investment and that Sikorsky's share stood at 42%. Holland also indicated that the company would deliver its first model 550 in 2013 and would produce 50 to 100 aircraft per year.

In May 2012 the company signed a deal with Sikorsky subsidiary PZL Mielec that will see the Polish company build the Eclipse 550 fuselage, empennage and wings.

2013

The first Eclipse 550 was rolled out in March 2013 and the first customer delivery was on 22 October 2013.

2014

The Eclipse 550 was certified in March 2014, and 32 jets were delivered, with over 50% gross margin per aircraft on those with pre-existing inventory and 30% on future aircraft. By August 2014 the company had laid off a "substantial" number of production workers due to slow aircraft sales. As a result of US$635,000 in city and state incentives Eclipse Aerospace has an obligation to hire 100 new workers by the end of 2015.

2015

The company merged with turboprop-maker Kestrel Aircraft to form One Aviation in April 2015.

2021

In February 2021 One Aviation entered Chapter 7 liquidation. The assets for the Eclipse aircraft program were then purchased by AML Global Eclipse and the company name was changed to Eclipse Aerospace, Inc.

== Aircraft ==
Model name	First flight	Number built	Type
Eclipse 550	2012	14	Twin engine very light jet
Total Eclipse	2009	24	Twin engine very light jet
