= Mixed flow compressor =

Type of gas compressor

A mixed flow compressor, or diagonal compressor, combines axial and radial components to produce a diagonal airflow compressor stage. The exit mean radius is greater than at the inlet, like a centrifugal design, but the flow tends to exit in an axial rather than radial direction. This eliminates the need for a relatively large diameter exit diffuser associated with centrifugal compressors. The impeller can be machined from solid using NC machines, in much the same way as that of a centrifugal design.

Diagonal compressors were widely experimented during and just after World War II, but did not see much service use. A diagonal-flow compressor is featured since 2001 in the Pratt & Whitney Canada PW600 series turbofan engines used in the Phenom 100, Eclipse 500, Cessna Citation Mustang and other very light jet aircraft.

== See also ==
- Gas compressor
