= Williams V-Jet II =

Jet designed by Burt Rutan

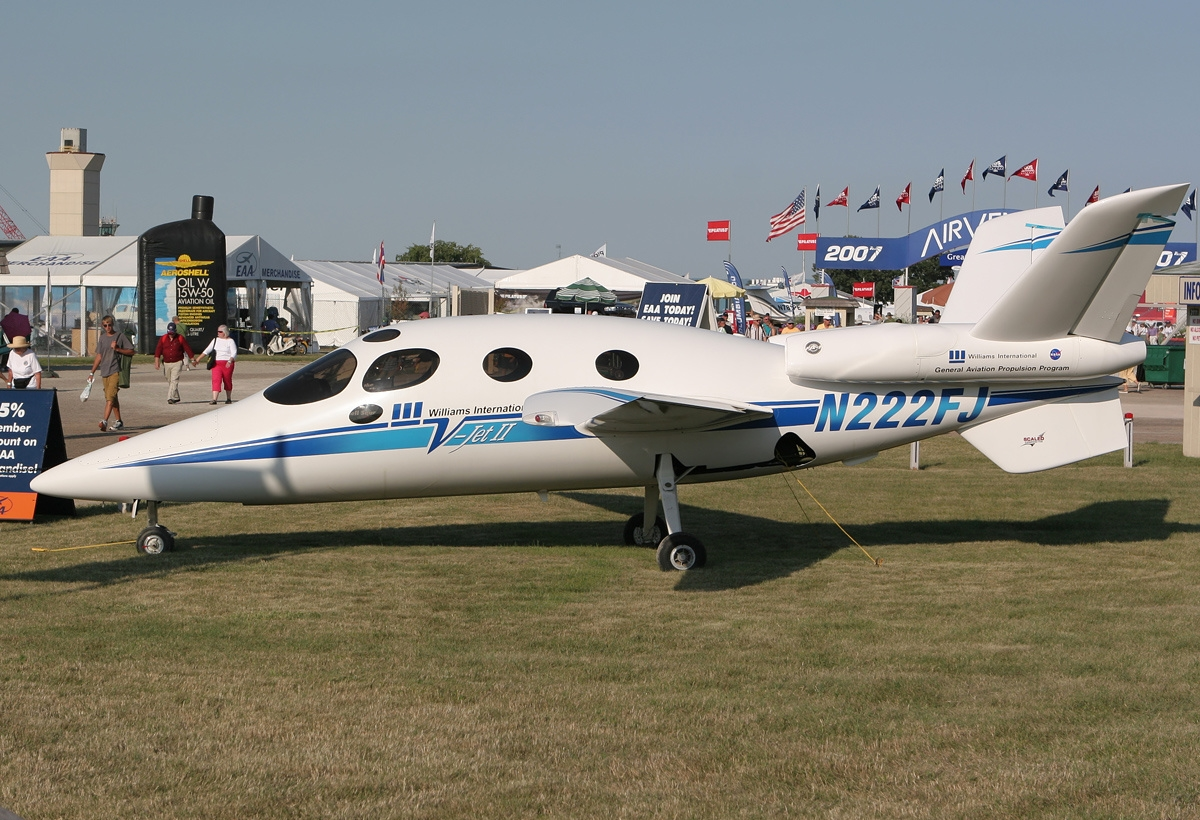

General information
- Type: Light jet
- National origin: United States
- Manufacturer: Williams International, Scaled Composites
- Designer: Burt Rutan
- Status: On display
- Number built: 1

History
- Introduction date: 1997
- First flight: 1997
- Retired: 2001
- Developed into: Eclipse 500

The Williams V-Jet II is an aircraft that was designed and built by Burt Rutan's Scaled Composites for Williams International as a test bed and demonstrator for Williams' new FJX-1 turbofan engine.

== Development ==
Williams International had been building small turbofan engines for cruise missile applications since the 1950s, and had successfully entered the general aviation market in the late 1980s with the FJ44 engine. In 1992, NASA initiated a program, Advanced General Aviation Transport Experiments (AGATE) to partner with manufacturers and help develop technologies that would revitalize the sagging general aviation industry. In 1996, Williams joined AGATE's General Aviation Propulsion (GAP) program to develop a fuel-efficient turbofan engine that would be even smaller than the FJ44. The result was the FJX-2 engine, which produced 550 lbf (2,400 N) thrust.

Williams then contracted with Burt Rutan's Scaled Composites to design and build the V-Jet II, considered a Very Light Jet (VLJ), to use as a testbed and technology demonstrator to showcase the new engine. At Scaled, the aircraft was known as the Model 271. The aircraft and engine were debuted at the 1997 Oshkosh Airshow. Scaled's test pilot Doug Shane received the Iven C. Kincheloe Award from the Society of Experimental Test Pilots for his flight test work on the plane.

The V-Jet II was an all-composite structure with a forward-swept wing, a V-tail, each fin of which was mounted on the nacelle of one of the two engines. The overall design was quite reminiscent of the LearAvia Lear Fan, although much smaller.

Williams had not intended to produce the aircraft, but it attracted a lot of attention, and Eclipse Aviation was founded in 1998 to further develop and produce the aircraft. The airframe was significantly redesigned as an all-metal structure sporting a T-tail, and the name Eclipse 500. The prototype flew with a pair of EJ-22 engines, a variant of the FJX-2. However, performance was not satisfactory, and the design was changed to use two Pratt & Whitney Canada PW610F engines, which had been specifically designed by Pratt for the Eclipse.

The prototype and only V-Jet II aircraft was obtained by Eclipse Aviation along with the program, and was donated to the Experimental Aircraft Association AirVenture museum in Oshkosh, Wisconsin in 2001.

== Specifications (V-Jet II) ==
General characteristics

- Length: 35 ft 1 in (10.69 m)
- Wingspan: 35 ft 4 in (10.77 m)
- Wing area: 118 sq ft (11.0 m^{2})
- Empty weight: 2,200 lb (998 kg)
- Gross weight: 3,800 lb (1,724 kg)
- Powerplant: 2 × Williams FJX-2 turbofan, 550 lbf (2.4 kN) thrust each

Performance

- Maximum speed: 300 kn (350 mph, 560 km/h)
- Service ceiling: 30,000 ft (9,100 m)
