= Very light jet =

Class of small jet aircraft under 10,000 lb.

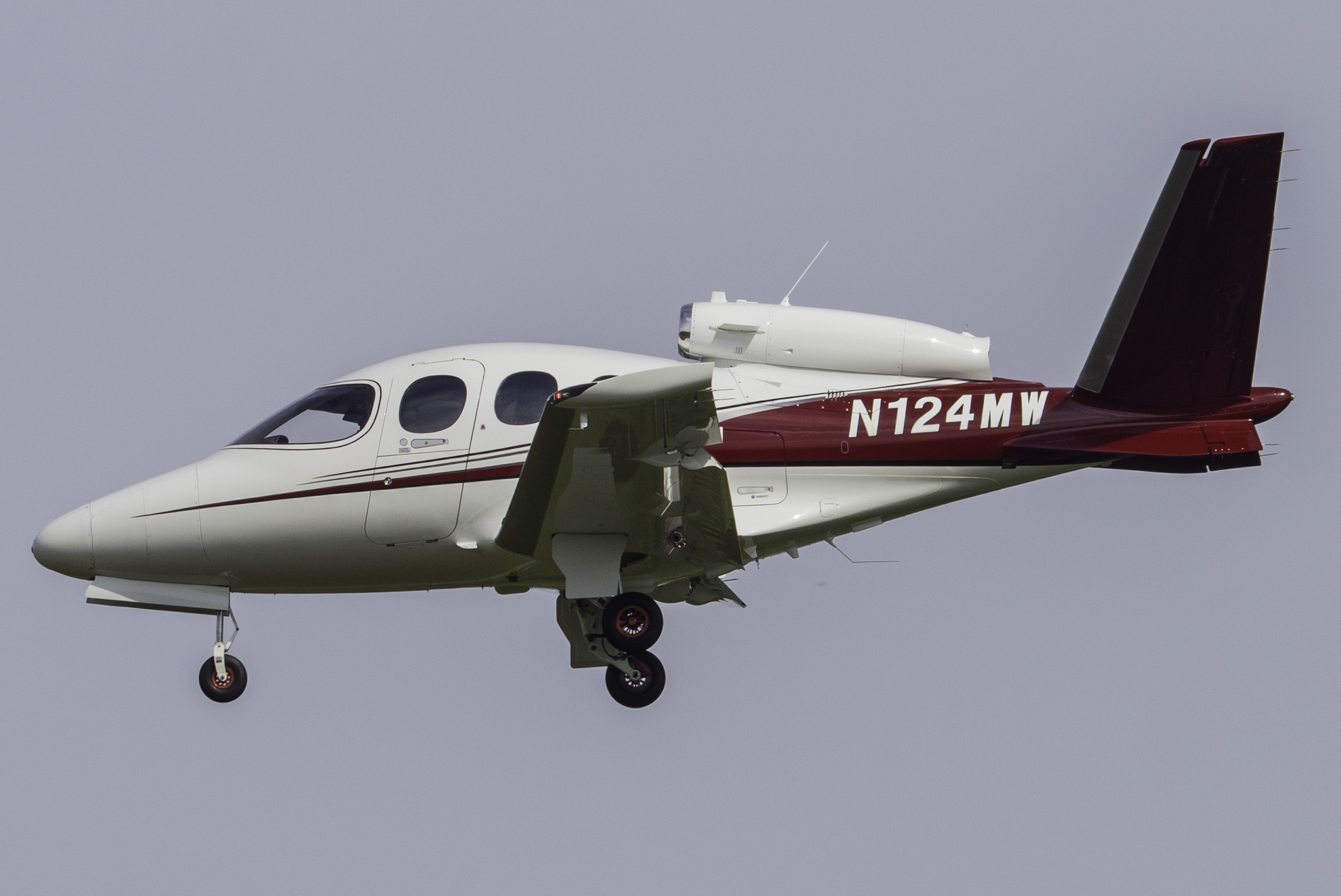
The Cirrus Vision SF50 was the first certified single-engine civilian jet and is the most-produced VLJ with 721 deliveries as of 2025

A very light jet (VLJ), entry-level jet or personal jet, previously known as a microjet, is a category of small business jets that seat four to eight people. VLJs are considered the lightest business jets and are approved for single-pilot operation.

== History ==
The first small jet-powered civil aircraft, the 1950s Morane-Saulnier MS.760 Paris, has been retroactively suggested as being the first VLJ, as it seats four with a single pilot and is smaller than modern VLJs. The production of MS.760 differs from modern business jets in having a sliding canopy for cabin access rather than a door; a six-seat version with an enclosed cabin and a conventional door was canceled after a single prototype was built.

Two unbuilt Cessna aircraft of the 1950s and 1960s would have met the definition of a VLJ. The first was the 407, a four-seat civil version of the T-37 jet trainer proposed in 1959; however, the 407 never progressed past the mockup stage due to insufficient customer interest. The second was the Fanjet 500, which had an MTOW of 9,500 pounds (4,310 kg) and a single pilot as originally envisioned in 1968; however, as the aircraft evolved into the Citation, the U.S. Federal Aviation Administration demanded a second pilot and various design changes, resulting in an MTOW of 10,350 pounds (4,690 kg).

Other attempts to create small jet aircraft in this class in the 1970s and 1980s were the Gulfstream Aerospace FanJet 1500 and the CMC Leopard.

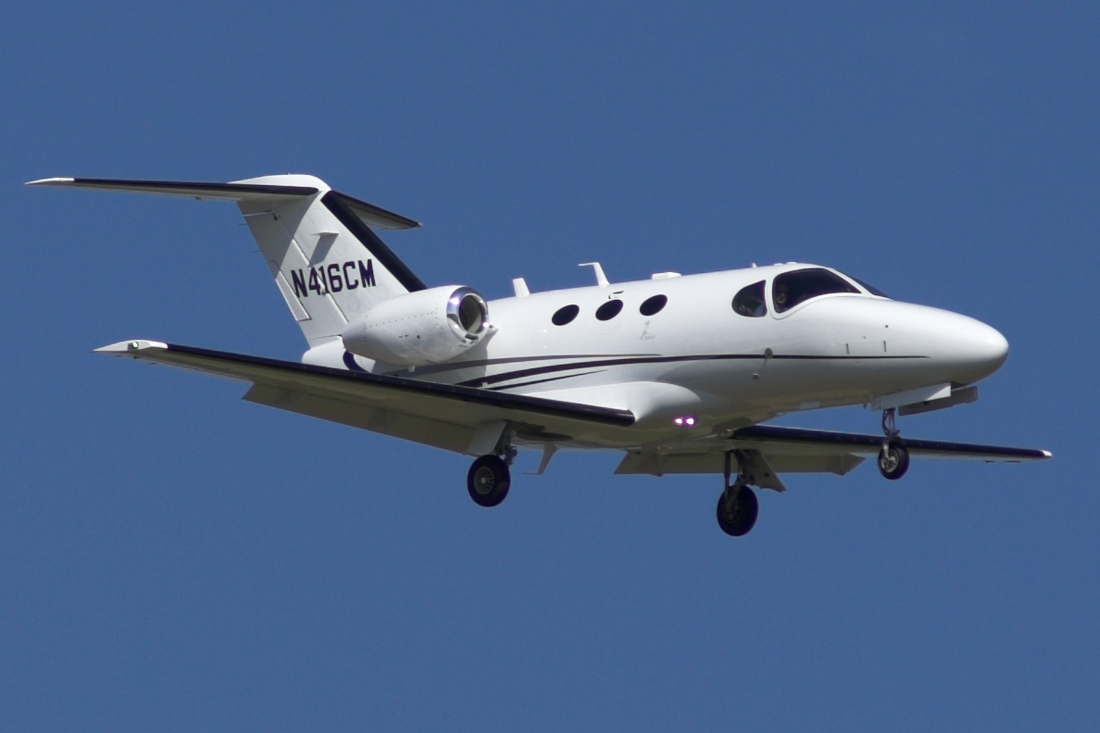
The Cessna Citation Mustang was the first VLJ, produced from 2006–2017, and is the second most-produced with 479 delivered

After a flurry of interest in the Small Aircraft Transportation System (SATS) and air taxi markets in the early 2000s, the VLJ sector underwent significant expansion. Several new designs were produced, such as the Embraer Phenom 100, the Cessna Citation Mustang, and the Eclipse 500. However, following the late 2000s recession the air taxi market underperformed expectations, and both Eclipse Aviation and air taxi firm DayJet collapsed. In December 2010, AvWeb's Paul Bertorelli explained that the term very light jet has lost favor in the aviation industry: "Personal jet is the description du jour. You don't hear the term VLJ—very light jet—much anymore and some people in the industry tell me they think it's because that term was too tightly coupled to Eclipse, a failure that the remaining players want to, understandably, distance themselves from."

Single-engine designs were popular in the mid-2000s, before the Great Recession diminished the market appeal of the category. Most such projects, which included the Piper Altaire, Diamond D-Jet, Eclipse 400 and VisionAire Vantage, were shelved. As of 2016, the only projects to proceed were the Cirrus Vision SF50, which was type certified that year and put into production, and the Stratos 714, which at the time expected certification in 2019. Single-engine VLJs are expected to compete with single turboprop aircraft.

Two VLJs in history have won the Collier Trophy, known as the most prestigious aerospace engineering award in the United States — the Eclipse 500 in 2006 and the Cirrus Vision SF50 in 2018.

== Target market ==
VLJs are intended to have lower operating costs than conventional jets, and to be able to operate from runways as short as 3,000 feet (910 m), either for personal use or in point-to-point air taxi service. In the United States, the Small Aircraft Transportation System is aimed at providing air service to areas ignored by airlines.

Florida-based air taxi provider DayJet, which on October 3, 2007 began its Eclipse 500 service, planned to operate more than 1,000 of the VLJs within five years, and had stated in mid-2007 that it planned to operate 300 Eclipse 500s serving 40 regional airports in the Southeastern United States by the end of 2008. DayJet ceased operations on September 19, 2008.

== Production ==
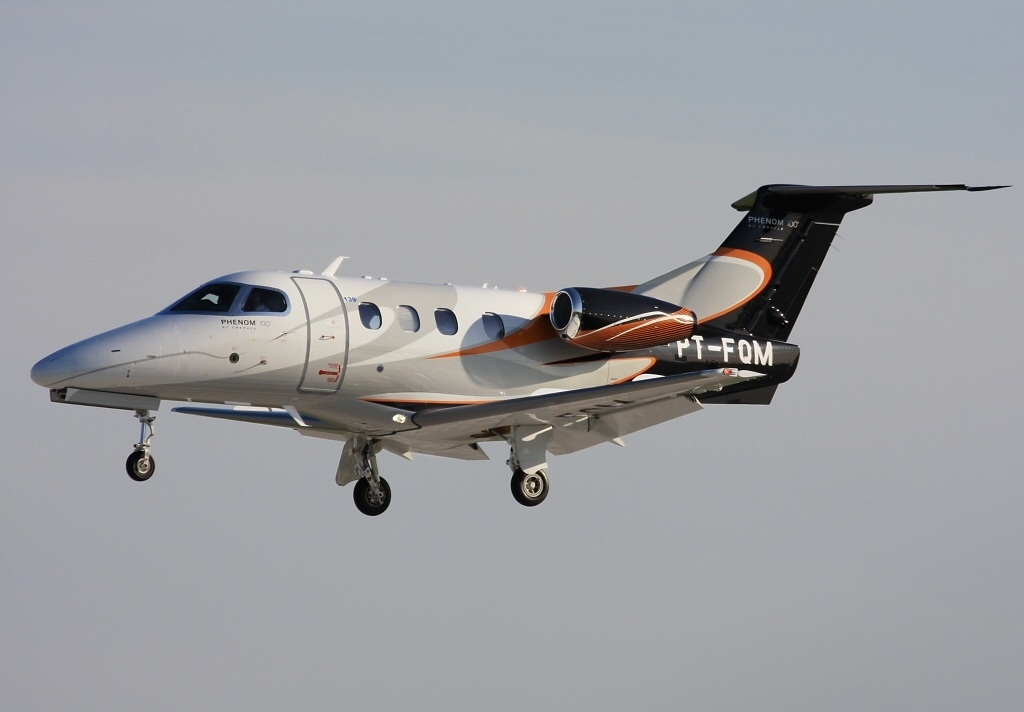
Still delivered, the Embraer Phenom 100 is the third most-produced VLJ and began production in December 2008

Many models are under development or awaiting certification, while others have failed. Six have so far made deliveries to customers:

- 2006–2017 : Cessna Citation Mustang
- 2006–2008 : Eclipse EA500
- 2008–present : Embraer Phenom 100
- 2013–present : Cessna CitationJet/M2
- 2014–2017, 2023–2024 : Eclipse 550
- 2015–present : Honda HA-420 HondaJet
- 2016–present : Cirrus Vision SF50

The Cessna Citation Mustang was the first production VLJ, first delivered in November 2006, and discontinued in May 2017, and the Cirrus Vision SF50 is the first single-engine production VLJ, beginning deliveries in December 2016.

Business jet sales suffered due to the late 2000s recession. The General Aviation Manufacturers Association reported in November 2010 that third quarter business jet sales were down 20.3% over the same period in 2009, with light jets suffering the most. In 2020, business jet deliveries slowed again due to the COVID-19 pandemic, with a 20% decrease over the previous year. However, the industry bounced back the following year, in 2021, with a 10% increase over 2020 and a single VLJ delivery more than in 2019. The Cirrus Vision SF50 is the most-delivered VLJ with 721 total from 2016 through 2025 and most-delivered per year since 2018, and the Eclipse 500 has the most deliveries in a single year with 161 in 2008.

Deliveries
Year	Cirrus Vision SF50	Cessna Citation Mustang	Embraer Phenom 100	Cessna CitationJet/M2	Eclipse 500/550	Honda HA-420 HondaJet	Total
2006	-	1	-	-	1	-	2
2007	-	45	-	-	98	-	143
2008	-	101	2	-	161	-	264
2009	-	125	97	-	-	-	222
2010	-	73	100	-	-	-	173
2011	-	43	41	-	-	-	84
2012	-	38	29	-	-	-	67
2013	-	20	30	12	-	-	62
2014	-	8	19	46	12	-	85
2015	-	8	12	41	7	2	70
2016	3	10	10	38	8	23	92
2017	22	7	18	39	6	43	135
2018	63	-	11	34	-	37	145
2019	81	-	11	34	-	36	162
2020	73	-	6	24	-	31	134
2021	86	-	6	34	-	37	163
2022	90	-	7	33	-	17	147
2023	96	-	11	25	2	22	156
2024	101	-	10	22	-	11	144
2025	106	-	14	22	-	12	154
Total	721	479	434	404	295	271	2604

== Engines ==
Engine	Thrust	Weight	Application
FJ33-5A	8.21 kN (1,846 lbf)	144.7 kg (319 lb)	Cirrus SF50
FJ44-1AP	8.47 kN (1,965 lbf)	240.5 kg (530 lb)	Citation M2
FJ44-4C	15.3kN (3,450 lbf)		HondaJet
HF120	9.32 kN (2,100 lbf)	211.3 kg (466 lb)	HondaJet
PW610	4.226 kN (950 lbf)	115.7 kg (255 lb)	Eclipse 500/550
PW615	6.49 kN (1,460 lbf)	140 kg (310 lb)	Citation Mustang
PW617	8.411 kN (1,891 lbf)	172 kg (379 lb)	Phenom 100

== Interior amenities ==
When these smaller jets were first mooted, there was much interest in the fact that they would not have a lavatory on board, with articles discussing the matter in The New York Times and items on NBC Nightly News. Some manufacturers argued that for short flights of 300 to 500 miles (480 to 800 km) and 40 to 80 minutes' duration, the lavatory issue was not a problem and air taxi service companies said that it was not a concern for most of their passengers. Despite this, the Eclipse 500 had the option of an electric flush, remove-to-service lavatory with a privacy curtain - at the expense of one passenger seat, and the proposed Adam A700 design had a seven-seat configuration with rear lavatory with a privacy curtain. The Cessna Mustang also has an emergency toilet, but it is located between the cockpit and cabin. The Embraer Phenom 100 offers a fully enclosed lavatory with a solid door. The 2015 Honda HA-420 HondaJet has a full lavatory at the rear of the aircraft with flushing toilet, full sink and closing door.

== List ==
In production In development Homebuilt Completed Dormant/canceled Demonstrators
Aircraft	Seats	MTOW	Cabin height	Engines	Max. cruise	Max range	Specific range @ LR TAS	Unit cost	Deliv.	First flight	Status
Cirrus SF50	5–7	6,000 lb	4.1 ft	1× FJ33	305 kn	1,275 nmi	0.863 nmi/lb @ 259 kn	$3.25m	615	3 Jul 2008	delivered since 2016
Eclipse 550	6	6,000 lb	4.2 ft	2× PW610F	375 kn	1,125 nmi	1.040 nmi/lb @ 334 kn	$2.9m	35	March 2013	2014–2017 deliveries, (Note: One Aviation announced in March 2017 that production would phase out as it prepared development of the Eclipse 700, which never entered production for the company before it went into bankruptcy in 2018 and whose Eclipse assets were purchased by a new company in 2021.) resumed 2023
HA-420 HondaJet	6–8	11,100 lb	4.8 ft	2× HF120	422 kn	1,547 nmi	0.663 nmi/lb @ 360 kn	$6.95M	259	3 Dec 2003	delivered since 2015
Citation M2	6–8	10,700 lb	4.8 ft	2× FJ44	404 kn	1,550 nmi	0.626 nmi/lb @ 323 kn	$6.15M	382	29 Apr 1991	delivered since 1993
Phenom 100	6–8	10,703 lb	4.9 ft	2× PW617F	406 kn	1,178 nmi	0.626 nmi/lb @ 340 kn	$4.995M	420	26 Jul 2007	delivered since 2008
Flaris LAR01	5	4,080 lb	4.0 ft	1× FJ33	415 kn	1,730 nmi		$2m		5 Apr 2019	sales started 2024
Stratos 714	4	8,421 lb	4.8 ft	1× JT15D	415 kn	1,500 nmi		$3–3.5m		21 Nov 2016	in development (Note: Slightly stretched into the Stratos 716X, first flight July 2, 2020, sold in kit before type certification which would need at least $100–150 million)
FLS Microjet	1	659 lb		1× PBS TJ-100	278 kn	200 nmi		$0.1895m		Jan 2011	
SubSonex	1	1,000 lb		1× PBS TJ-100	220 kn	300+ nmi		$0.135m		10 Aug 2011	
Viper Jet	2	5,100 lb		1× J85	430 kn	800 nmi		$0.48–0.65m		Oct 1999	
Citation Mustang	6	8,645 lb	4.5 ft	2× PW615F	340 kn	1,167 nmi	0.641 nmi/lb @ 319 kn	$3.35m	479	23 Apr 2005	2006–2017 deliveries
Eclipse 500	6	6,000 lb	4.2 ft	2× PW610F	370 kn	1,125 nmi		$2.15m	260	26 Aug 2002	2006–2008 deliveries
Adam A700	5-7	9,350 lb		2× FJ33	340 kn	1,200 nmi		$1.9m	2	28 Jul 2003	2008 bankruptcy
Comp Air Jet	8	8,900 lb		1× AI-25	320 kn	1,250 nmi		$1.2m		10 Jul 2004	2006 last update
ATG Javelin	2	6,900 lb		2× FJ33	530 kn	1,200 nmi		$2.995m		30 Sep 2005	2008 halt
Diamond D-Jet	5	5,115 lb		1× FJ33	315 kn	1,350 nmi		$1.89m		18 Apr 2006	2013 suspension
Eclipse 400	4	4,480 lb		1x PW615F	345 kn	1,250 nmi		$1.35m		2 Jul 2007	2009 bankruptcy
Epic Victory	3–5	5,500 lb		1× FJ33	320 kn	1,200 nmi		$1m		6 Jul 2007	2009 bankruptcy (Note: Epic Aircraft went into bankruptcy in 2009 and its assets were bought in April, 2010 by Aviation Industry Corporation of China who are restarting Victory production and certification as of July 2010. However, as of 2024, production had not been resumed.)
Epic Elite	7	7,701 lb		2× FJ33	390 kn	1,600 nmi		$2.35m		7 Jun 2007	2009 bankruptcy
AVCEN Jetpod	7–8	6,750 lb								16 Aug 2009	2009 crash (Note: owner and founder died during first flight crash)
PiperJet	7	7,000 lb		1× FJ44	360 kn	1,300 nmi		$2.20m		30 Jul 2008	2011 suspension (Note: Development suspended indefinitely on October 26, 2011)
S-33 Independence	9	7,500 lb	5.0 ft	2× FJ33	415 kn	2,000 nmi		$3.945m		7 Jan 2006	2006 crash (Note: No update on certification date from company. In 2009 Spectrum announced that new S-40 Freedom project will be first for certification and production)
Sport Jet II	4-5	5,250 lb		1× JT15D	380 kn	1,000 nmi		$1.20m		12 May 2006	2006 crash (Note: Second Pre-Production Aircraft was being built in production 2011, accepting orders.)
Vantage	6	8,200 lb		1× JT15D	350 kn	999 nmi		$1.65m		16 Nov 1996	2003 bankruptcy (Note: VisionAir bankrupt and liquidated 2003, design developed into EV-20 Vantage Jet project)
Honda MH02	6	7,937 lb		2× JT15D	353 kn					5 Mar 1993	1998 deregistration
Williams V-Jet II		3,800 lb		2× FJX-2	300 kn					13 Apr 1997	2001 donation
Aircraft	Seats	MTOW	Cabin height	Engines	Max. cruise	Max. range	Specific range @ LR TAS	Unit cost	Deliv.	First flight	Status

== See also ==
- Environmental impact of aviation – Effect of emissions from aircraft engines
- Index of aviation articles
