= Cessna Citation Mustang =

Very light business jet

Citation Mustang
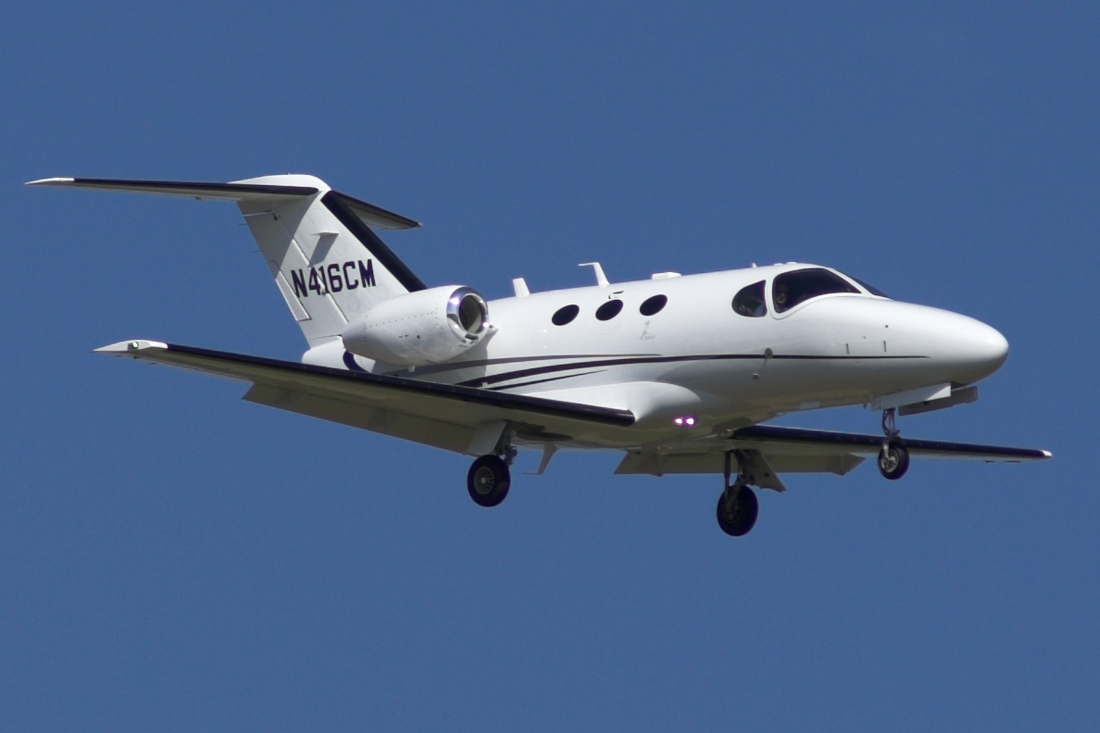
- The Citation Mustang is a light business jet with twin aft-mounted turbofans.

General information
- Type: Business jet
- National origin: United States
- Manufacturer: Cessna
- Status: Out of production
- Primary users: GlobeAir AG, Hoersching, Austria (16) WiJet, Paris (6) + Blink Ltd, London (9); Aeropartner A.S., Prague (4)
- Number built: 479

History
- Manufactured: 2006–2017
- Introduction date: 2006
- First flight: April 23, 2005

The Cessna Citation Mustang is a very light jet that was built by Cessna. Launched at the 2002 NBAA convention, the Model 510 first flew on April 23, 2005. It received its FAA type certification on September 8, 2006, and was first delivered on November 22. Production ended in 2017 after 479 aircraft were built. The 8,645 lb (3,921 kg) maximum take-off weight jet is powered by two Pratt & Whitney Canada PW615F 1,460 lbf (6.5 kN) turbofans, can reach 340 kn (390 mph; 630 km/h), and has a range of 1,167 nmi (1,343 mi; 2,161 km).

== Development ==
The Mustang was launched at the 2002 NBAA convention. The prototype made its maiden flight on April 23, 2005. On August 29, 2006, one month ahead of schedule, the first production Mustang made its first flight. The airplane received full type certification from the Federal Aviation Administration (FAA) on September 8, 2006. Cessna received FAA certification to fly into "known icing conditions" on November 9, 2006. Cessna delivered the first production LJ on November 22, 2006, the same day the FAA awarded Cessna with the necessary certification.

On April 23, 2007, Dave and Dawn Goode of GOODE Ski Technologies received the first retail delivered Cessna Mustang. In May 2007, certification from the European Union Aviation Safety Agency (EASA) was received; the first delivery to a European customer took place in November of that year.

On 20 August 2008, the 100th Mustang was delivered to a private owner; at the time, Cessna observed that they expected to deliver around 150 aircraft next year. In April 2009, the 200th Mustang was handed over to the Honolulu-based operator Maritime Air Charters. That same year, it was announced that the British aerospace firm Marshall Group had secured full approval to provide maintenance and modifications for the Mustang, while FAA approval was received for the use of Garmin's synthetic vision system on the Mustang.

In June 2010, a production slowdown of the Mustang was enacted, reportedly due to a combination of supply chain issues caused by flooding in Rhode Island as well as lower sales of the type. Later that same year, Cessna launched an enhanced edition of the aircraft called the High Sierra, which features higher-quality cabin furnishings and enhanced avionics, including synthetic vision. In late January 2012, the 400th Mustang was completed. In 2015, its unit cost was US$3.35 million.

In May 2017, Cessna terminated production of the Mustang in response to low customer demand for the aircraft, which was partially attributed as having been caused by internal competition from the company's own Cessna Citation M2. The company had been selling an average of 40 Mustangs each year until the M2 was introduced in 2013, at which point Mustang sales dropped to just 24 aircraft over the next three years. The competing Citation M2 is a faster and larger aircraft that can still operate from similar-length runways and requires the more-common C/E-525 type rating, which potentially reduces training and crewing costs over the Mustang. A total of 479 examples of the Citation Mustang were produced.

While new-build aircraft ceased to be built in 2017, support for the existing Mustangs was maintained; this included two separate upgrade programs announced at the Citation Jet Pilots Association (CJP) convention in 2017. In 2018, used 2009-2016 Mustangs were priced at $1.85-2.5 million.

In 2019, a test aircraft using a modified Mustang fuselage but powered by a single turboprop engine, aircraft registration N350CE, was photographed by a Wichita engineer. A Cessna vice president interviewed by AvWeb confirmed the existence of the aircraft and said that Cessna had been considering producing a new model to fill the gap between the Mustang and the Cessna 350 Corvalis, but characterized the test aircraft as a "technology demonstrator" rather than a proof of concept vehicle or a prototype, and would not confirm plans for production.

== Design ==
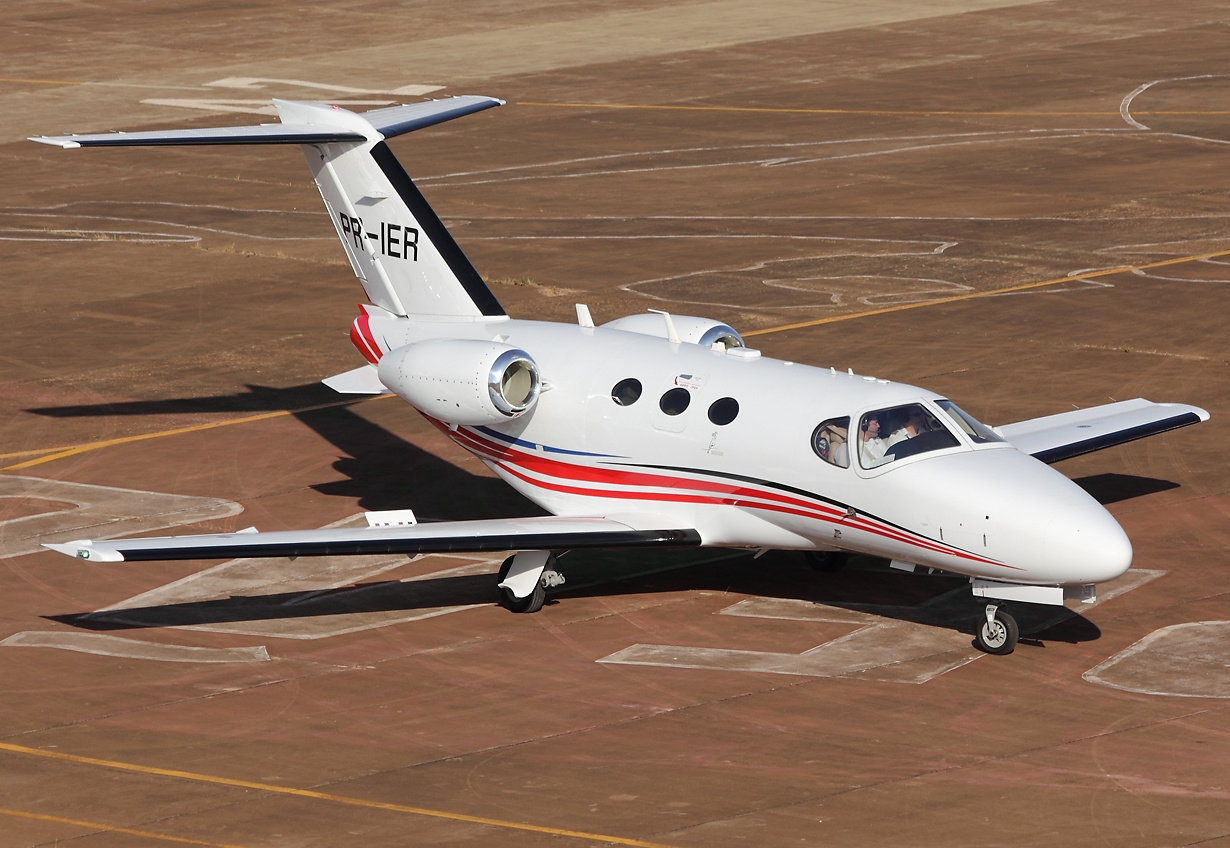
On ramp with spoilers extended

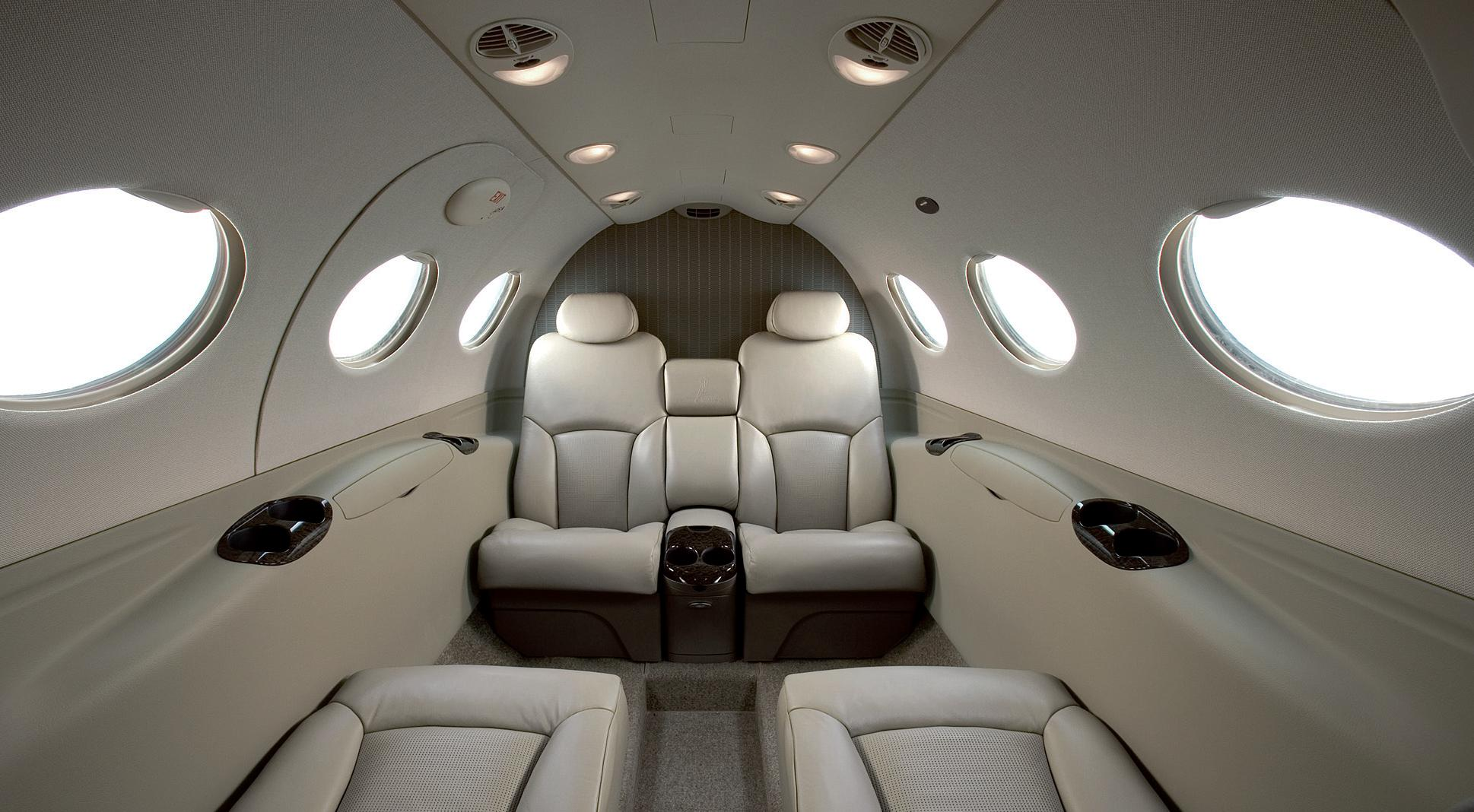
Cabin interior

The Cessna Citation Mustang is a low-wing, cantilever monoplane with a tapered wing, T-tail, and retractable tricycle gear. One main door is located in the forward left section of the aircraft, with an additional emergency exit on the center right section of the fuselage. In its standard configuration, the Mustang has four passenger seats in the aft cabin, a toilet, and seating for two in the cockpit. The airframe is primarily of aluminum alloy construction and has a three-spar wing. Power is provided by a pair of Pratt & Whitney Canada PW615F turbofans mounted in pods on the aft fuselage. The aircraft was built at the Cessna production facility in Independence, Kansas. Like many other light jets, the Mustang is approved for single-pilot operation.

== Specifications ==
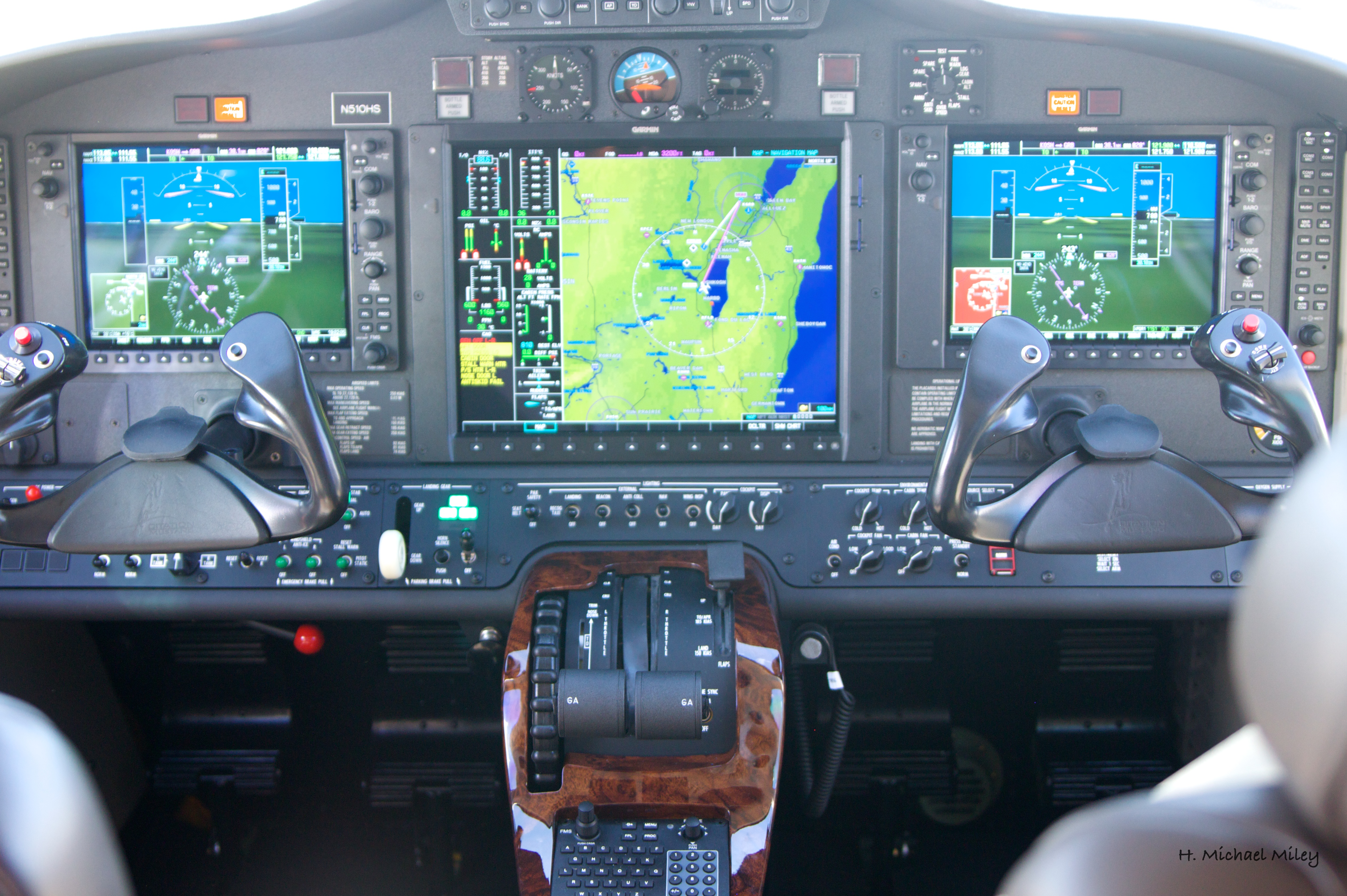
Cessna Citation Mustang instrument panel

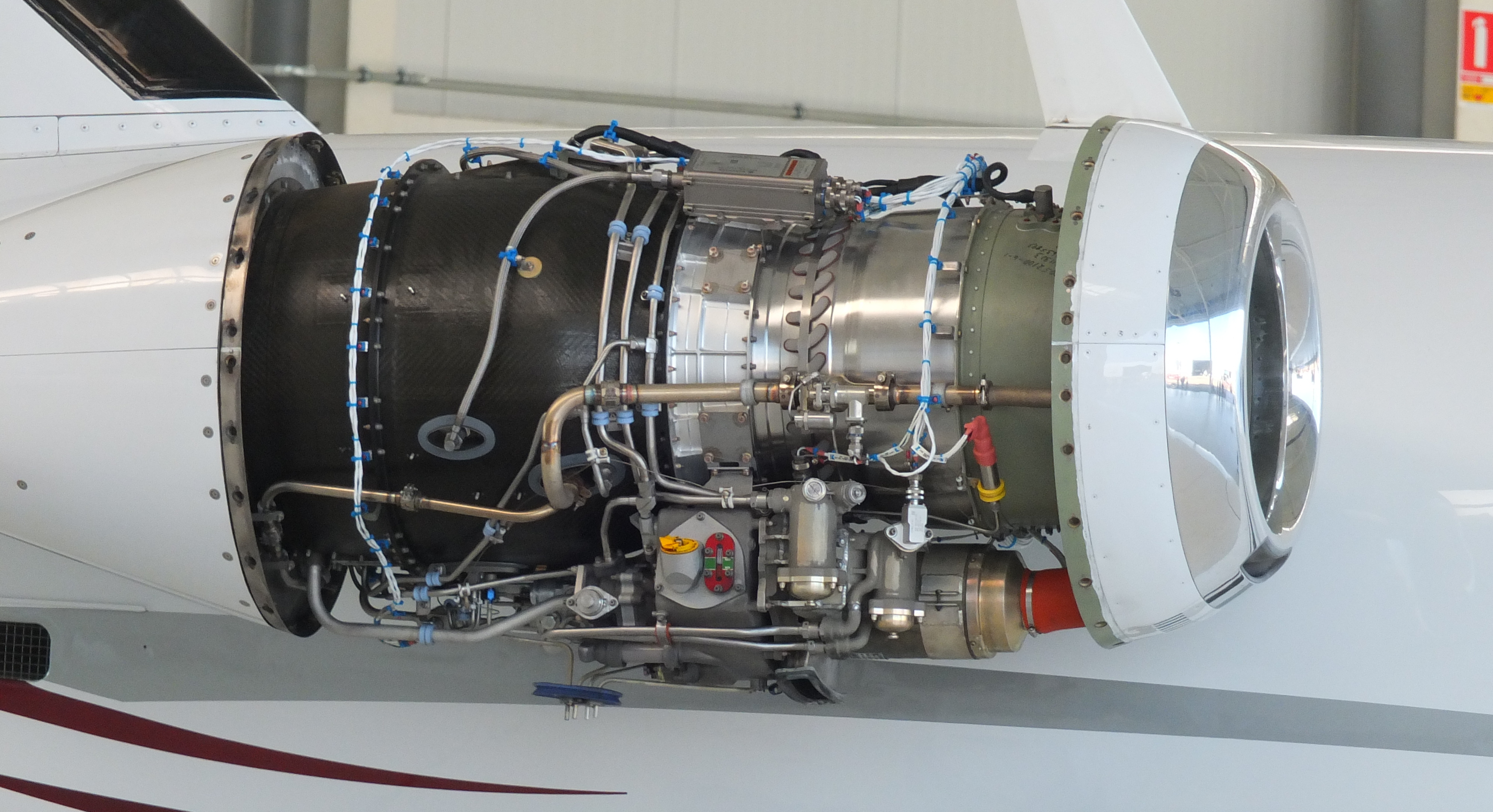
A Mustang PW615F engine uncowled

Data from Cessna Aircraft Company

General characteristics

- Crew: one or two pilots
- Capacity: up to 5 passengers (dependent on cabin configuration) and 3,130 lb (1,420 kg) useful load
- Length: 40 ft 7 in (12.37 m)
- Wingspan: 43 ft 2 in (13.16 m)
- Height: 13 ft 5 in (4.09 m)
- Empty weight: 5,600 lb (2,540 kg)
- Max takeoff weight: 8,645 lb (3,930 kg)
- Powerplant: 2 × Pratt & Whitney Canada PW615F turbofans, 1,460 lbf (6.5 kN) thrust each

Performance

- Maximum speed: 483 mph (777 km/h, 420 kn)
- Cruise speed: 391 mph (629 km/h, 340 kn)
- Range: 1,343 mi (2,161 km, 1,167 nmi) (at maximum takeoff weight)
- Service ceiling: 41,000 ft (12,500 m)
- Rate of climb: 3,010 ft/min (15.3 m/s)
- Thrust/weight: 0.337 (at maximum takeoff weight)
- Takeoff distance: 3,110 ft (948 m)
- Landing distance: 2,380 ft (729 m)

Avionics

- Garmin G1000

== Operators ==
Half of the fleet is in the U.S. and Canada, mostly operated by firms or individuals owning a single aircraft and typically flown by their owners, with some owners defraying a portion of the fixed operating costs by sharing use with air charters. Outside of North America, most are exclusively flown by third-party crews. Most of the other half of the fleet is registered in Europe: 23 aircraft in the British Isles, 20 aircraft in Austria, 20 in France, 11 in Germany, six in the Czech Republic, five in Switzerland and four in Italy. In Latin America, Brazil has 31 aircraft, there are 10 in Mexico, three in Argentina, two in Venezuela and one each in Chile, Guatemala, Panama and Paraguay. In the Middle East, four aircraft are in Turkey, as in Egypt and two are in Israel. Six are in Africa, nine in Australia and five in New Zealand. There are 4 Certified Full Flight Simulators available in the world for this aircraft type: Rome Monterotondo, Italy; Scottsdale, Arizona, USA; Wichita, Kansas, USA; and Farnborough, UK.

Year	2006	2007	2008	2009	2010	2011	2012	2013	2014	2015	2016	2017	total
Deliveries	1	45	101	125	73	43	38	20	8	8	10	7	479

== See also ==
Aircraft of comparable role, configuration, and era

- Eclipse 500 / 550
- Embraer Phenom 100
- Cessna Citation M2
- HondaJet
- Cirrus Vision SF50

Related lists

- List of very light jets
