= Eclipse 500 =

Very light business jet

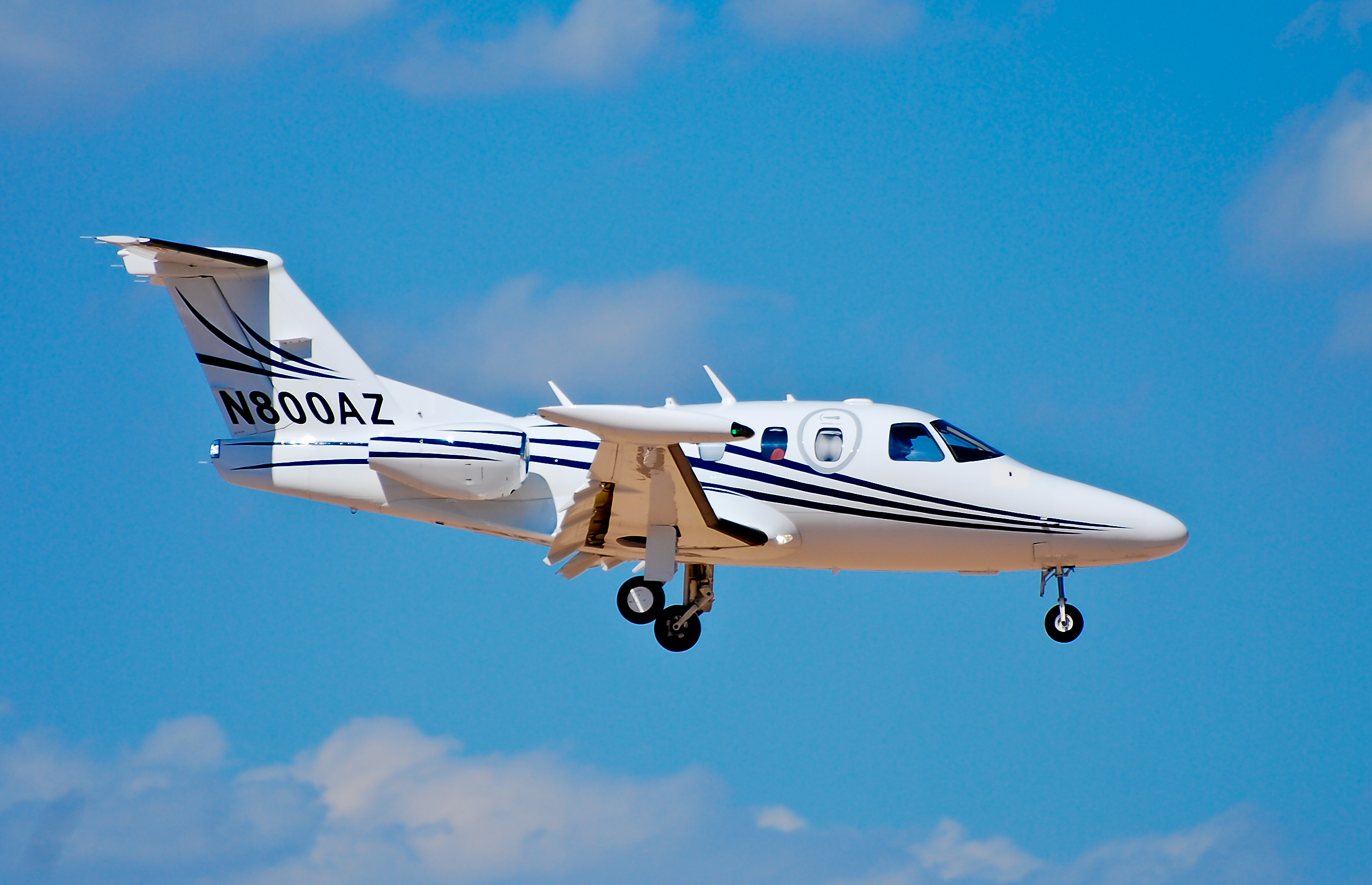

General information
- Type: Very light jet
- National origin: United States
- Manufacturer: Eclipse Aviation/Eclipse Aerospace
- Status: Production ended
- Primary user: DayJet (defunct in 2008)
- Number built: 260

History
- Manufactured: December 2006–November 2008
- Introduction date: December 31, 2006
- First flight: August 26, 2002
- Developed from: Williams V-Jet II
- Developed into: Eclipse 550

The Eclipse 500 (model EA500) is a very light jet (VLJ) originally produced by Eclipse Aviation of Albuquerque, New Mexico, United States. The company was founded in 1998 to develop the 1997 Williams V-Jet II demonstrator. The prototype first flew with Williams EJ22 turbofans on August 26, 2002. The engines were replaced by Pratt & Whitney Canada PW610Fs in 2004 and Eclipse Aviation won the Collier Trophy in February 2006 for the design. A provisional FAA type certification was received on 27 July 2006 and the first delivery occurred on 31 December 2006.

The six-seat aircraft has an all-metal airframe with a T-tail and straight wings. It is powered by two turbofan engines in aft fuselage-mounted nacelles.

Production of the Eclipse 500 was halted in October 2008 due to lack of funding, after 260 aircraft had been delivered. On November 25, 2008, Eclipse Aviation entered Chapter 11 bankruptcy, then Chapter 7 liquidation on 24 February 2009. In August 2009, Eclipse Aerospace bought the Eclipse Aviation assets, and announced the Eclipse 550 update in October 2011. Eclipse Aerospace was merged into One Aviation in April 2015, which entered Chapter 7 bankruptcy liquidation in February 2021.

AML Global Eclipse maintains support for all Eclipse aircraft.

== Development ==
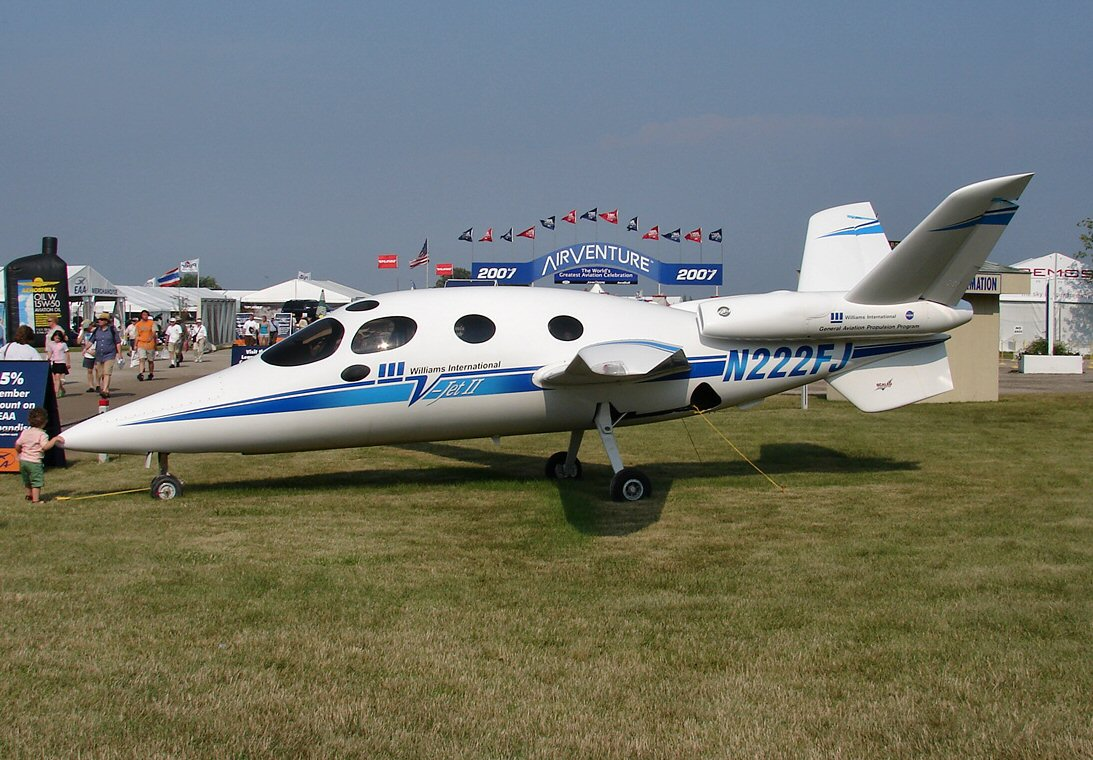
The Williams V-Jet II

The Eclipse 500 is based on the Williams V-Jet II, which was designed and built by Burt Rutan's Scaled Composites in 1997 for Williams International as a testbed and demonstrator for their new FJX-2 turbofan engine. The aircraft and engine debuted at the 1997 Oshkosh Airshow.

The V-Jet II had an all-composite structure with a forward-swept wing, a V-tail, each fin of which was mounted on the nacelle of one of the two engines. Williams had not intended to produce the aircraft, but it attracted a lot of attention, and Eclipse Aviation was founded in 1998 to further develop and produce the aircraft. The prototype and sole V-Jet II aircraft in existence was obtained by Eclipse Aviation, along with the program. The prototype was donated to the Experimental Aircraft Association AirVenture museum in Oshkosh, Wisconsin in 2001.

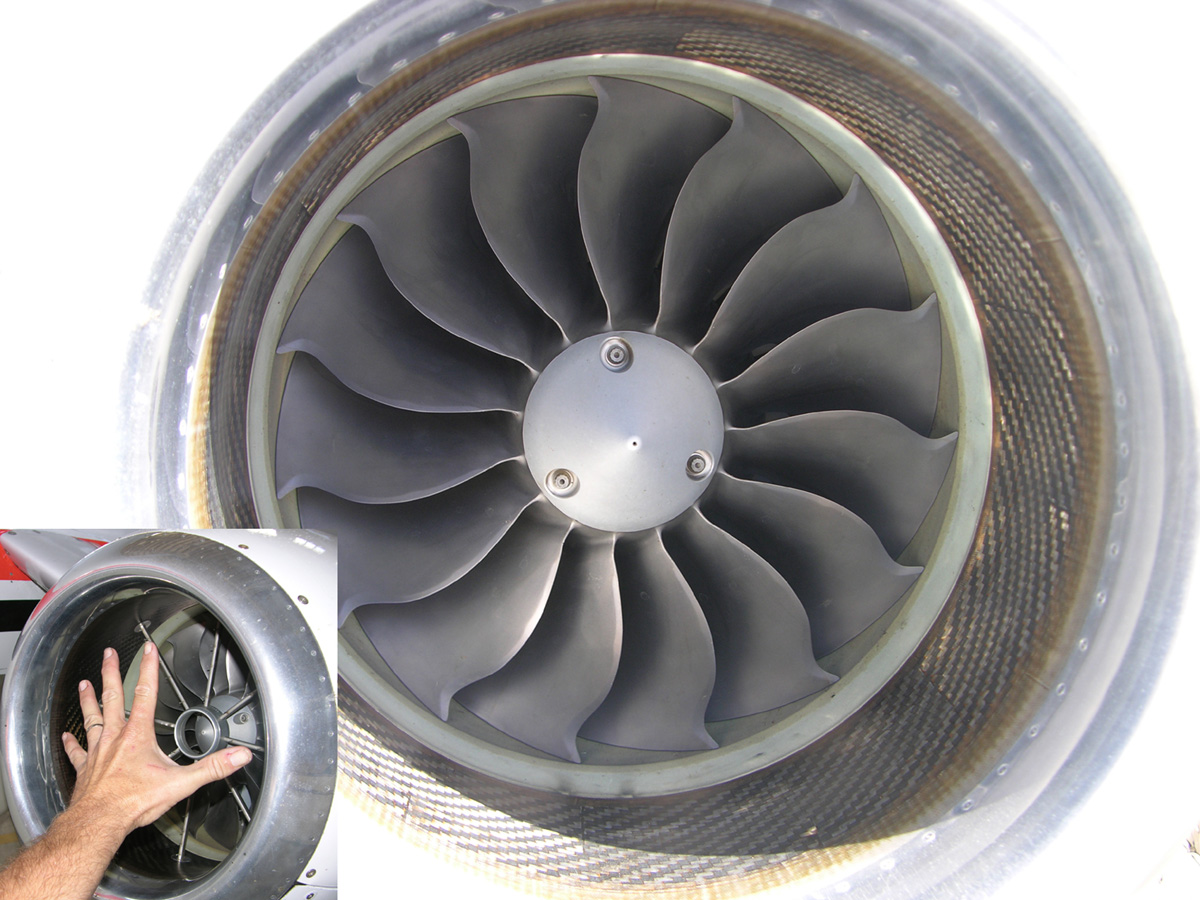
PW610F engine inlet, with inset to show relative size

Originally Eclipse selected a pair of Williams International EJ-22 engines (a production variant of the FJ22/FJX-2) for the Eclipse 500, but as the aircraft's weight increased, performance was not satisfactory. The prototype Eclipse 500 first flew with the Williams FJ22 engines on August 26, 2002.

Pratt & Whitney Canada agreed to participate in the project, and modified the design of their PW615 engine, designating it the Pratt & Whitney Canada PW610F. The redesign to incorporate the new engines resulted in a significant delay to the development program. The first flight of the Eclipse 500 with the PW610 engines occurred on December 31, 2004. Eclipse claims that its aircraft is "the quietest jet aircraft" and that it is "quieter than virtually all multi engine turboprop and piston aircraft".

=== Certification ===
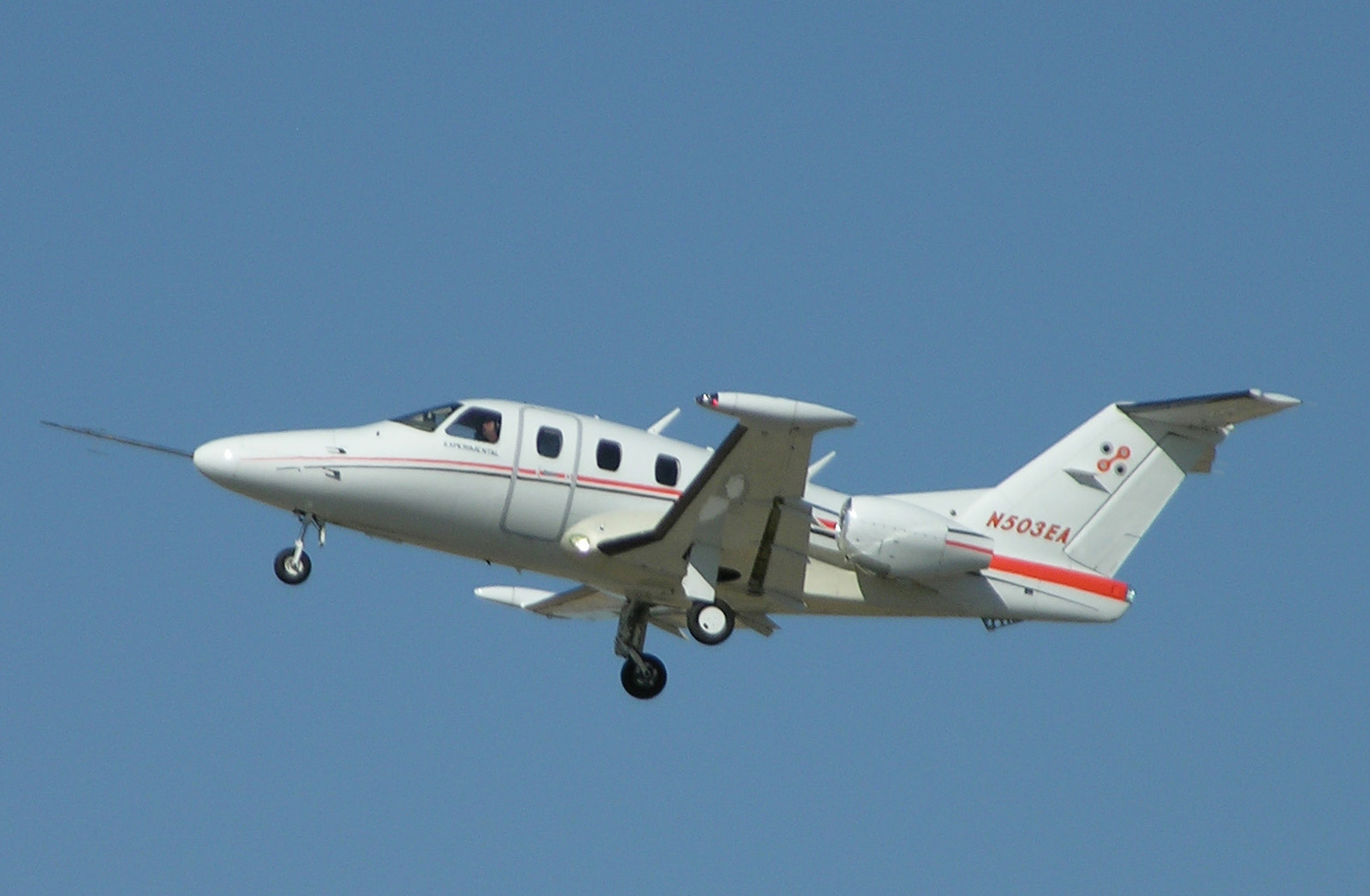
Eclipse 500 prototype flight test in 2006

United States

The Eclipse 500 received provisional type certification from the FAA on 27 July 2006, shortly after the aircraft's PW610F engine was certified by Transport Canada. FAA Administrator Marion Blakey presented Raburn with the provisional certificate in a special ceremony at the 2006 Oshkosh Airshow. Full certification was not granted at that time because the composite wing tip fuel tanks did not meet FAA lightning strike criteria. As a result, Eclipse started testing an improved wingtip fuel tank made from aluminum. Eclipse also started production of the 500, so aircraft could be released to customers once full certification was achieved.

Full type certification was eventually achieved on 30 September 2006. At that point, in addition to the five flying prototypes, 23 aircraft were in production and two had already been completed. The 500 type certificate allows the aircraft to be flown under IFR with a single pilot.

Eclipse received its FAA production certificate on 26 April 2007. Serial numbers 1 through 11 were produced prior to the production certificate being granted, and these aircraft were subject to individual FAA inspection. Serial numbers 12 and higher were built under production certificate No. 500.

The aircraft received its certification for flight into "known icing conditions" on 25 June 2008.

The Eclipse 500 was given an initial airframe life of 10,000 hours, 10,000 cycles or 10 years, whichever came first. By carrying out additional fatigue testing, in June 2013 Eclipse Aerospace was able to have the FAA raise this limit to 20,000 hours or 20,000 cycles with an unlimited calendar life.

Europe

European Aviation Safety Agency certification for private use was achieved on 21 November 2008. It requires the aircraft to be equipped differently from the FAA certification, including the Avio NG 1.5 avionics system, a third attitude indicator and dual Mode S transponders.

On 24 June 2009 EASA issued a statement suspending the Eclipse 500's type certificate, saying, "the current Holder of the EASA Type Certificate EASA.IM.A.171 has been notified on 10 June 2009, of the Agency's decision to suspend the EASA Type Certificate EASA.IM.A.171 with effect from 12 June 2009." No reason for the suspension was announced at that time. On 28 October 2009, EASA changed the name of the holder of the type certificate for the EA500 to Eclipse Aerospace.

=== Modifications ===
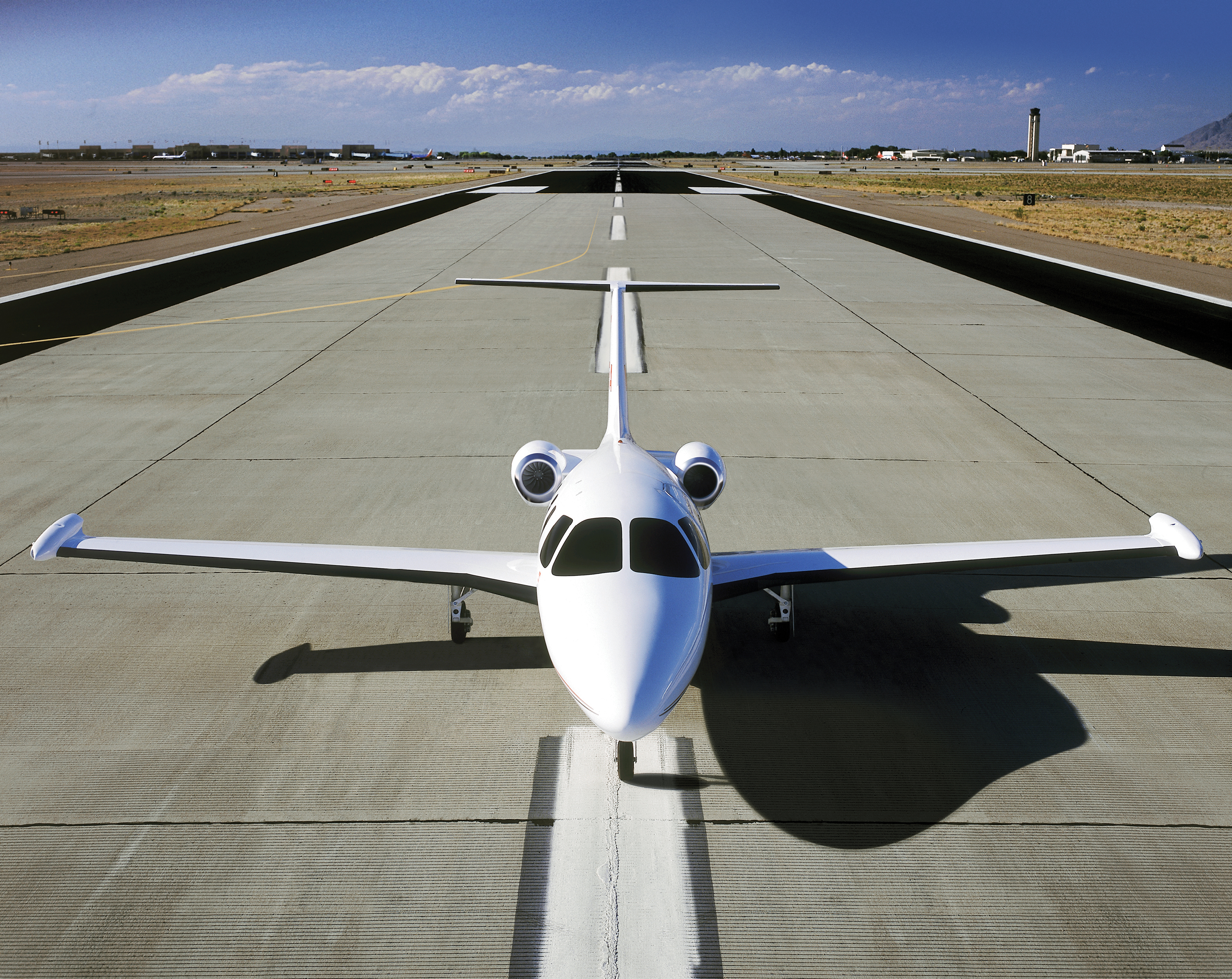
Front view

In early December 2006 and in March 2007, Eclipse announced in letters to customers a number of changes to the initial specifications, including new fairings for the landing gear, wheel covers, and tail; control surface hinge covers; extended rudder and elevator, to eliminate Gurney flaps; improved lower engine nacelle panel aerodynamics; extended wingtip fuel tanks (adding 12 U.S. gallons (45 L; 10.0 imp gal) on each side); changes to engine FADEC software to increase cruise thrust above 25000 ft altitude; overall weight increase of 79 lb (36 kg) with no change to full fuel payload or max useful load. Together, these measures were expected to increase the cruise speed from 360 to 370 kn TAS and increase NBAA IFR range from 1,055 to 1,125 nmi (1,954 to 2,084 km). All aircraft, including the already delivered initial deliveries, were to be upgraded to this new standard.

=== Total Eclipse refurbished aircraft ===
In March 2010, Eclipse Aerospace began offering refurbished EA500s under the brand name Total Eclipse. Company president Mason Holland explained: "In their rush to deliver the aircraft, the former manufacturer of the EA500 [Eclipse Aviation Corporation] delivered to owners an aircraft that was only about 85 percent complete. These aircraft were great performers, but still lacked several important features. We now have completed the design and engineering of the EA500." The used airframes now feature GNSS-coupled autopilots and the Flight Into Known Icing equipment package and retail for US$2.25M.

=== Eclipse Special Edition refurbished aircraft ===
In June 2015, the Eclipse Aerospace division of One Aviation discontinued the Total Eclipse refurbishment program and started a new program, designating it the Eclipse Special Edition (SE). The SE upgrades the production model Eclipse 500 to near-Eclipse 550 standards. Installed are dual Avio integrated flight management systems, anti-skid braking system, standby display unit, PPG glass windshields, improved interior and a new two-tone paint scheme. The SE upgrade package includes a three-year factory warranty and maintenance program, at a price of US$2.2M, including the provided base airframe to be upgraded.

== Design ==
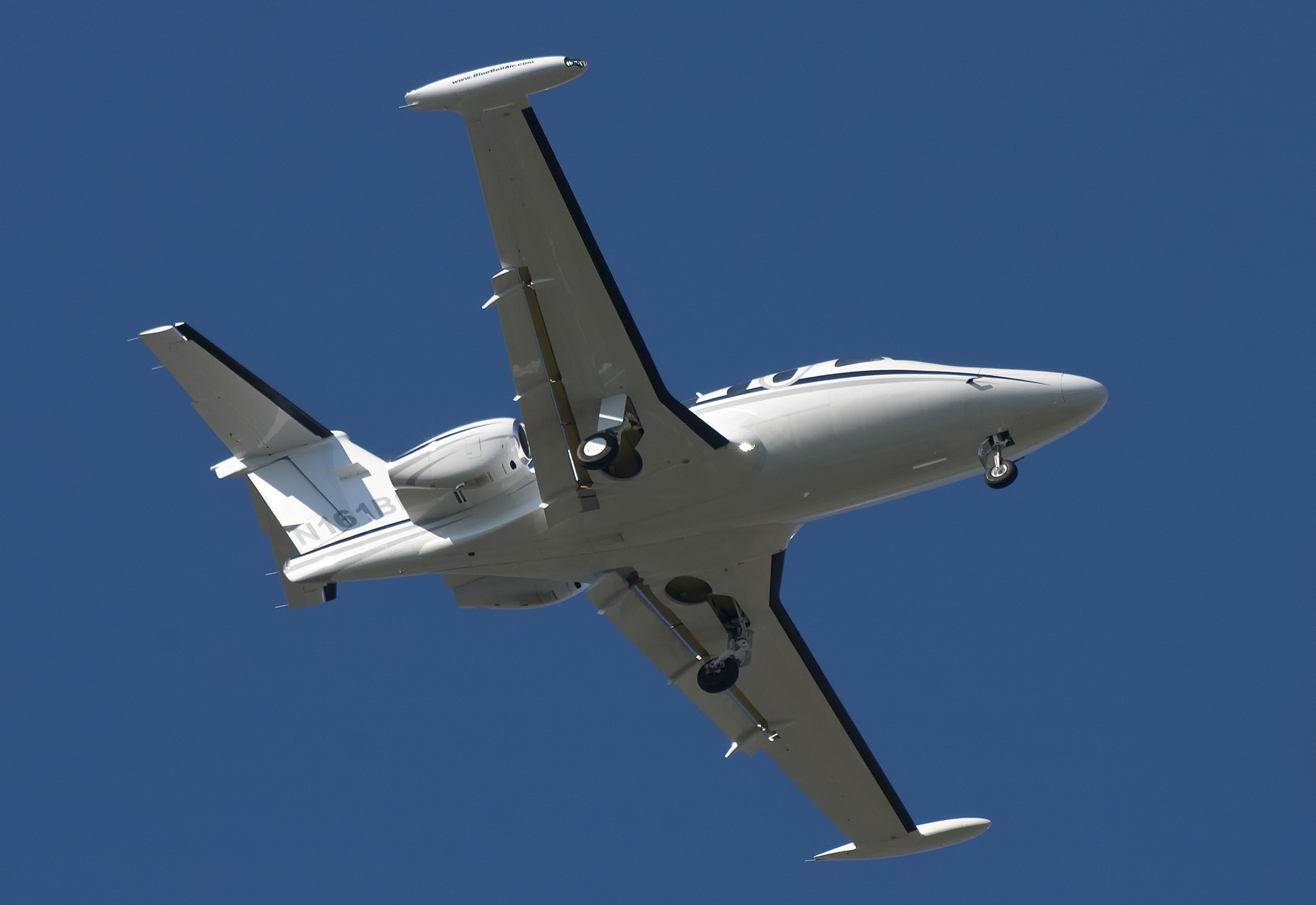
View from below showing the straight wing and retractable landing gear wells

Eclipse founder and former CEO Vern Raburn was one of the first business executives at Microsoft. Consequently, Bill Gates became a major stake-holder in the Albuquerque, New Mexico-based Eclipse project. Eclipse believed the V-Jet II was an ideal design to refine and market because it had been designed around one of the primary VLJ engines, as the VLJ concept has been pursued by other manufacturers.

The airframe was redesigned as an all-metal structure with a T-tail and straight wings. The main cabin shape is essentially all that was retained from the V-Jet II. It was recognized that for an aluminum structure to be cost effective, new manufacturing techniques would have to be developed. One of the primary processes used was friction stir welding, in which the skin and underlying aluminum structure are welded together rather than riveted, as traditional for aluminum aircraft. Anti-corrosion bonding techniques were also developed.

Besides materials processes, the general process of building the airframe was redesigned, with techniques taken from the automotive industry. Traditionally, an aircraft structure is mounted in a jig, and the skin is riveted onto the outside of it. For the Eclipse 500, lessons were taken from composite airframe manufacturing, and the aluminum skin is first laid in a mold, and then the structure is built onto it. The result is much more precise control of the aircraft's final shape, resulting in a cabin that is more robust and can be pressurized to a higher differential. In addition, the manufacturing techniques are designed so that one crew can assemble an airframe in a single shift. The complete interior is designed to be installed on a moving assembly line in 45 minutes.

=== Instrument panel ===
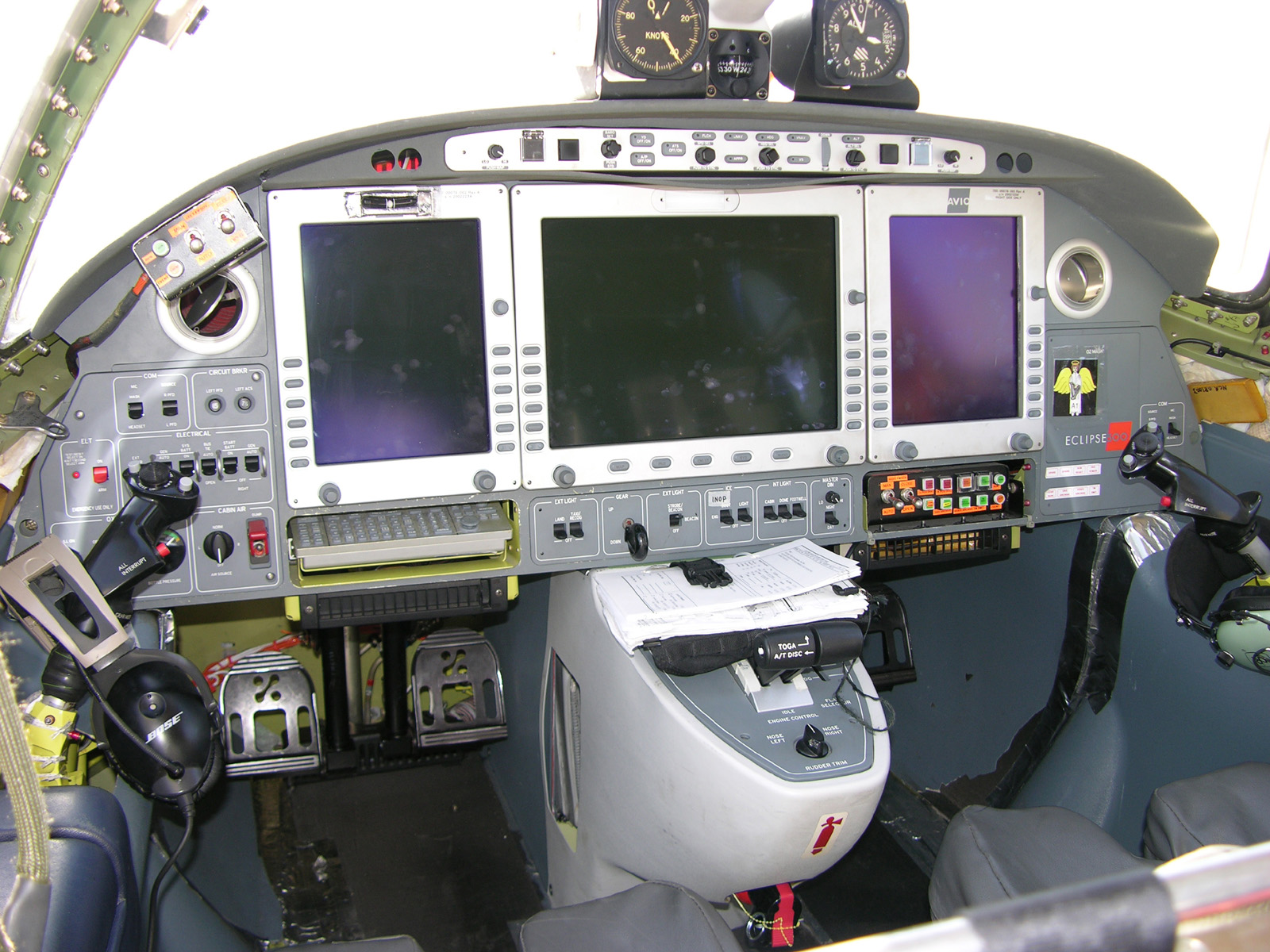
Original cockpit layout of prototype aircraft

The Eclipse 500 cockpit has glass cockpit technology and an integrated avionics package. Problems with the original configuration have involved a re-design of the system. The first aircraft have the original system called Avio installed. Later aircraft have the Avio NG system in place of the original Avio. The new avionics package was certified in December 2007 and it was intended at that time that the older Avio-equipped aircraft would be retrofitted to the same standard by the end of 2008.

=== Lavatory ===
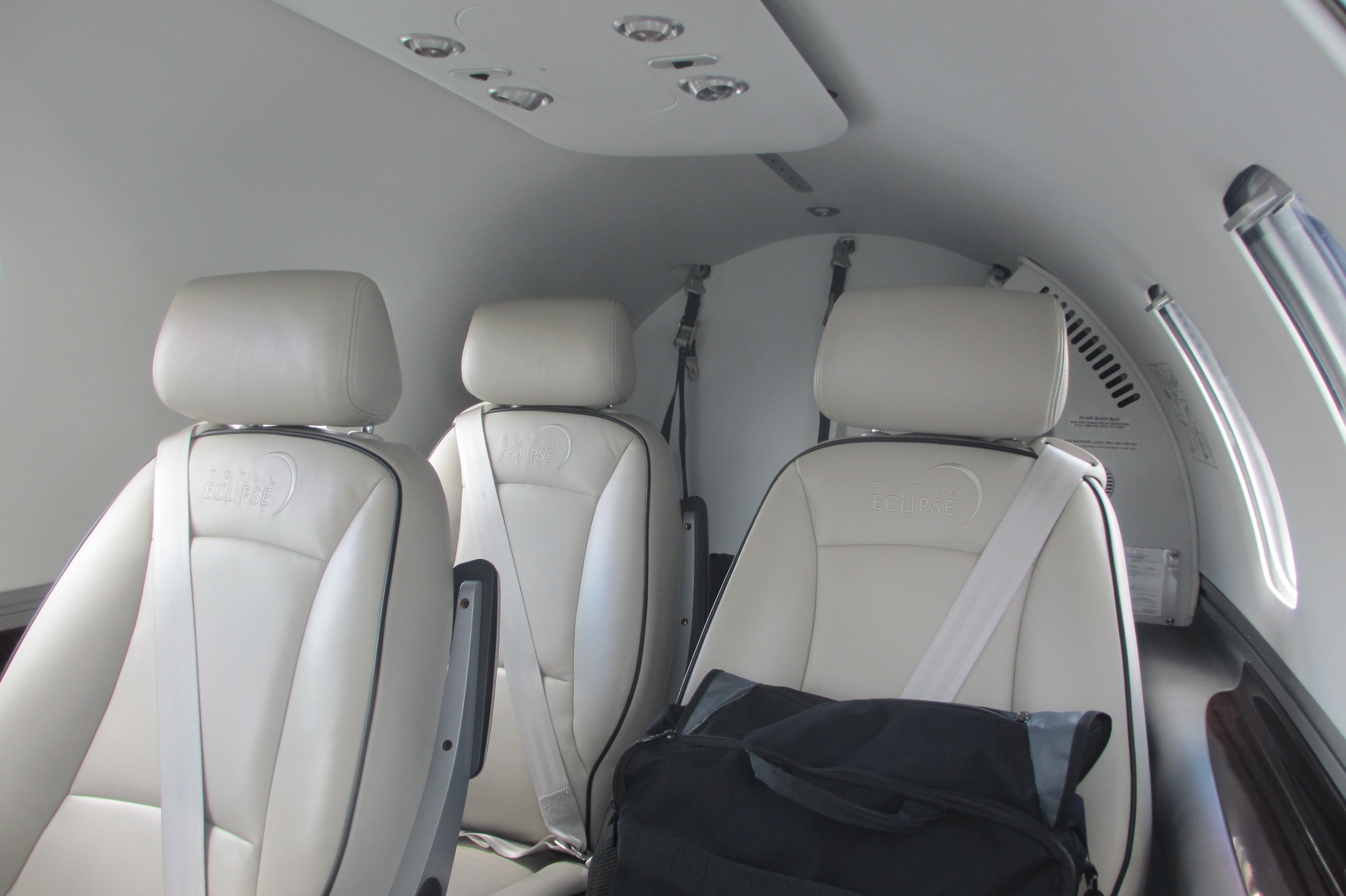
Eclipse 500 interior

The Eclipse 500 does not feature a lavatory. Raburn explained that the majority of users would be flying 300 to 500 miles in 40 to 80 minutes, alleviating the need for one. Adam Aircraft Industries (now defunct) CEO Rick Adam stated "people are not going to get on a plane without a bathroom, at least they are not going to do it more than once". Air taxi service company DayJet, the Eclipse 500 major customer, conducted surveys that showed that having a toilet is not a concern for most of their passengers. Its CEO stated that if it needed larger planes, they wouldn't need a toilet.

== Operational history ==
The Eclipse concept was to bring a new economy to small jet aircraft and both the cost of acquisition and ongoing operational costs were considered in the design of the plane. Eclipse marketed the aircraft to general aviation aircraft owners who had not previously owned a jet, placing it directly in competition with high-end piston and turboprop aircraft. Eclipse's marketing efforts focused on the aircraft's projected low service costs and comprehensive maintenance and support program for customers. Being able to land at over 10,000 airports in the United States, Eclipse and other VLJ manufacturers hoped that this would create an air taxi role for their aircraft. In February 2006, Eclipse won the Collier Trophy as it was "applying innovations created in the technology industry to drive down cost, increase performance, improve safety, and spur a new type of air travel — the air taxi". Aviation media website, AvWeb noticed the aircraft was not yet certified, and that the Collier award should go to an achievement of which the value "has been thoroughly demonstrated by actual use during the preceding year", while a revolution in air travel hadn't happened yet after three years.

=== Market ===
The EA500 original price was at $775,000, raised to $837,500 by mid-2001, then $1.175 million in January 2003, $1.295 million in May 2005 and $1.445 million in 2006. In July 2002, launch customer Nimbus canceled a 1,000-aircraft order, a week before the roll-out. Shortly after the August 2002 first flight, Eclipse decided not to proceed with the Williams EJ22 turbofan, as it was too susceptible to bird strikes and the thrust was insufficient, to replace it with heavier 250 lb (110 kg) engines up from 80 lb (36 kg), cutting range from 1,300 to 1,000 nmi (2,400 to 1,900 km) and inflating operating costs from 56 to 75 cents per mile.

By May 2007, Eclipse claimed a backlog of nearly 2,700 orders. In May 2008, Eclipse announced that the price of the Eclipse 500 would increase to $2,150,000 due to a lower than projected production volume which resulted in expected efficiencies not being realized and higher production costs.

Eclipse offered its Jet Complete program to guarantee a maintenance cost of $209 per flight hour for owners flying 300 to 3,000 hours over three years, while the Jet Complete Business was aimed at operators flying 250 to 1,500 hours annually.

=== Deliveries ===
Year	2006	2007	2008
Number of deliveries	1	98	161

In late November 2006, Raburn anticipated delivering 10 aircraft before the end of the year. The first airplane to be delivered was certified by the FAA on December 31, 2006, and its keys were handed on January 4, 2007 to shared jet ownership company Jet-Alliance and David Crowe, an owner-pilot who purchased a share of the aircraft.

In October 2008, production was halted at serial number 267 as Eclipse was awaiting funding and was unable to refund customer deposits while numerous lawsuits were filed by customers. No further Eclipse 500s were produced.

=== Bankruptcy ===
On November 25, 2008, Eclipse Aviation entered Chapter 11 bankruptcy. By then, 259 airplanes had been delivered, as creditors claimed $702.6 million and Eclipse estimated total liabilities at over $1 billion. S/N 260 had been paid in full before the bankruptcy filing, on the morning, but an Eclipse noteholder forbade the delivery, while a judge ordered Eclipse to maintain and insure the airplane. In the 23 January 2009 judgement, the aircraft was ordered to be released. The aircraft was delivered on 20 March 2009.

The company then entered Chapter 7 liquidation on 24 February 2009. On 20 August 2009, Eclipse Aviation assets were sold to Eclipse Aerospace. In October 2011, Eclipse Aerospace announced the Eclipse 550 update to be delivered from 2013.

In April 2015, Eclipse Aerospace was merged with Kestrel Aircraft to form One Aviation. A Chapter 11 reorganization process started in October 2018 but failed. In February 2021, One Aviation entered Chapter 7 bankruptcy liquidation, and AML Global Eclipse maintains support for all Eclipse aircraft under the name Eclipse Aerospace, Inc.

=== June 2008 grounding ===
On June 12, 2008, the Federal Aviation Administration issued Emergency Airworthiness Directive AD 2008-13-51 grounding all Eclipse 500s, following an incident at Chicago's Midway Airport. According to the National Transportation Safety Board investigation, "the airplane was trying to land at Midway when the crew encountered a sudden shift in headwinds, which the pilot sought to counter by increasing power, the standard method. But when the pilot tried to cut power a few seconds later, as the airplane touched down, the engines began accelerating to maximum power." The pilots overshot, gained altitude and shut down one engine, eventually landing without injury or damage except blown out tires.

Reports published on June 16, 2008 indicated that all 500s were compliant with the AD and cleared to fly again within one day of the AD being issued. The company indicated that the final solution to this problem was a software change to increase the throttle range and prevent an out-of-range condition.

=== Investigation of certification issues ===
In June 2008 the United States Congress tasked the Office of Inspector General for the Department of Transportation with the investigation of claims by FAA employees who have indicated that the certification process of the Eclipse 500 was flawed. Members of the National Air Traffic Controllers Association, which represents FAA Aircraft Certification Engineers, have filed a grievance alleging that the type certificate was improperly issued by FAA managers over a weekend and that the aircraft had outstanding safety issues at that time. The FAA stated that it stands behind its certification of the jet. Then Eclipse CEO, Vern Raburn, stated the 500 was in "complete and total conformity" and that he considered the complaint an internal FAA issue between workers and managers.

The concerns expressed by the union representing the certification engineers included:

- that the FAA issued the 500 type certificate "without allowing FAA aircraft certification engineers and flight test pilots to properly complete their assigned certification and safety responsibilities";
- FADEC issues, that indicated a loss of control of engine thrust could occur;
- Designated Engineering Representatives, who reported to FAA program managers, were being pressured by Eclipse;
- that, instead of taking action against the aircraft manufacturer for pressuring the DERs, the FAA management ignored complaints;
- that, at the time of the issue of the type certificate, the cockpit displays were not in compliance with the FARs, suffered repeated failures and displayed incorrect data.

=== FAA special review ===
On 11 August 2008, The FAA started a 30-day special review of its certification of Eclipse 500. The certification review team was composed of personnel who were not involved in the original certification effort, and was headed by Jerry Mack, a former Boeing safety executive. The team was mandated to examine aircraft safety, certification of aircraft trim, flaps, display screen blanking and stall speed issues. In response to the FAA review, Eclipse Aviation CEO Roel Pieper stated: "Without a doubt, this special review will uncover what we already know – that the Eclipse 500 marks the safest new airplane introduction into service in 20 years, customer safety has always been a priority at Eclipse, and we look forward to this investigation dispelling any inaccuracies about the certification of this airplane for once and for all."

On 12 September 2008, the certification review indicated that the certification process was valid, but that the FAA and Eclipse Aviation "should conduct a root cause analysis" of the owner-reported problems with the aircraft's trim, trim actuator and fire-extinguisher systems. Further report recommendations addressed internal FAA processes that were not optimally handled. Acting FAA Administrator Robert Sturgell responded to the review report saying: "This review tells us that while we made the right call in certifying this aircraft, the process we used could and should have been better coordinated. These recommendations will be invaluable as we continue certifying these new types of aircraft."

=== House of Representatives investigation ===
The US House of Representatives Aviation Subcommittee carried out a parallel investigation to the FAA panel. The House Aviation Subcommittee heard testimony from the inspector general for the Transportation Department, Calvin Scovel, on 17 September 2008. He testified that FAA employees were instructed by FAA management and that a target date was set for the Eclipse 500's certification, regardless of the test flying results. "It was a calendar-driven process... with a predetermined outcome," Scovel said. Scovel testified that FAA Administrator Robert Sturgell recently stated that the FAA is also reviewing the production certificate that was awarded to Eclipse.

US Representative Robin Hayes, (Republican, North Carolina) asked Scovel if the Eclipse jet is a safe airplane to fly. Scovel stated, "My office has no evidence that it is unsafe." Scovel added later in the proceedings that given the information that the FAA had on September 30, 2006, when the type certificate was awarded, "a reasonable decision would have been to defer the granting of the type certificate." The house aviation committee also heard on 17 September 2008 from a panel of current and former FAA employees. They stated that there was consistent pressure from FAA management to meet the stated timeline for the Eclipse 500 certification to be completed. They were told not to look more than "an inch deep" during the certification process. In the same hearings FAA managers defended their certification practices and denied many of the employees' allegations.

=== Customer support reduction ===
On 20 November 2008, Eclipse announced a reduction in company hours for maintenance scheduling, technical services and customer care. Aviation Week & Space Technology noted that "regardless of technical support, several critical spare parts are no longer in inventory because many vendors have stopped shipping spares to Eclipse until they receive payment for past due bills. And they won't ship more spares to Eclipse except on a COD basis. Notably, only a few vendors will sell parts directly to customers because of previous exclusive supply contracts with Eclipse."

In January 2009 all Eclipse factory support facilities were closed. One group of ex-employees set up a maintenance and support facility to assist the owners of the aircraft already delivered by that point.

=== Ceiling limits ===
In March 2011 the FAA issued an Airworthiness Directive restricting operation of the entire fleet of EA500s to 30,000 ft (9,144 m) from its previous limit of 37,000 ft (11,278 m) and before that 41,000 ft (12,497 m). The AD was required because a build-up of hard carbon deposits on the engine static vanes caused at least six reported engine surge incidents, requiring pilots to decrease power on the affected engine. The FAA was concerned that this problem "could result in flight and landing under single-engine conditions" or if it affected both engines, a double engine failure. This action is considered an interim solution while the engine certification authority, Transport Canada and Pratt & Whitney Canada devise a more permanent solution. In July 2011, the situation was resolved with a new combustion liner design from Pratt & Whitney Canada that, once implemented, will raise the aircraft's ceiling back up to 41,000 ft (12,497 m).

== Operators ==
United States

- DayJet – 28 aircraft – bankrupt September 2008
- Linear Air – 3 aircraft – originally 7
- North American Jet Charter – 7 aircraft
- Pierce Aviation – 4 aircraft
- Rocky Mountain Sport Jets – former operator of 5 aircraft

United Kingdom

- Channel Jets - 5 aircraft

=== DayJet ===
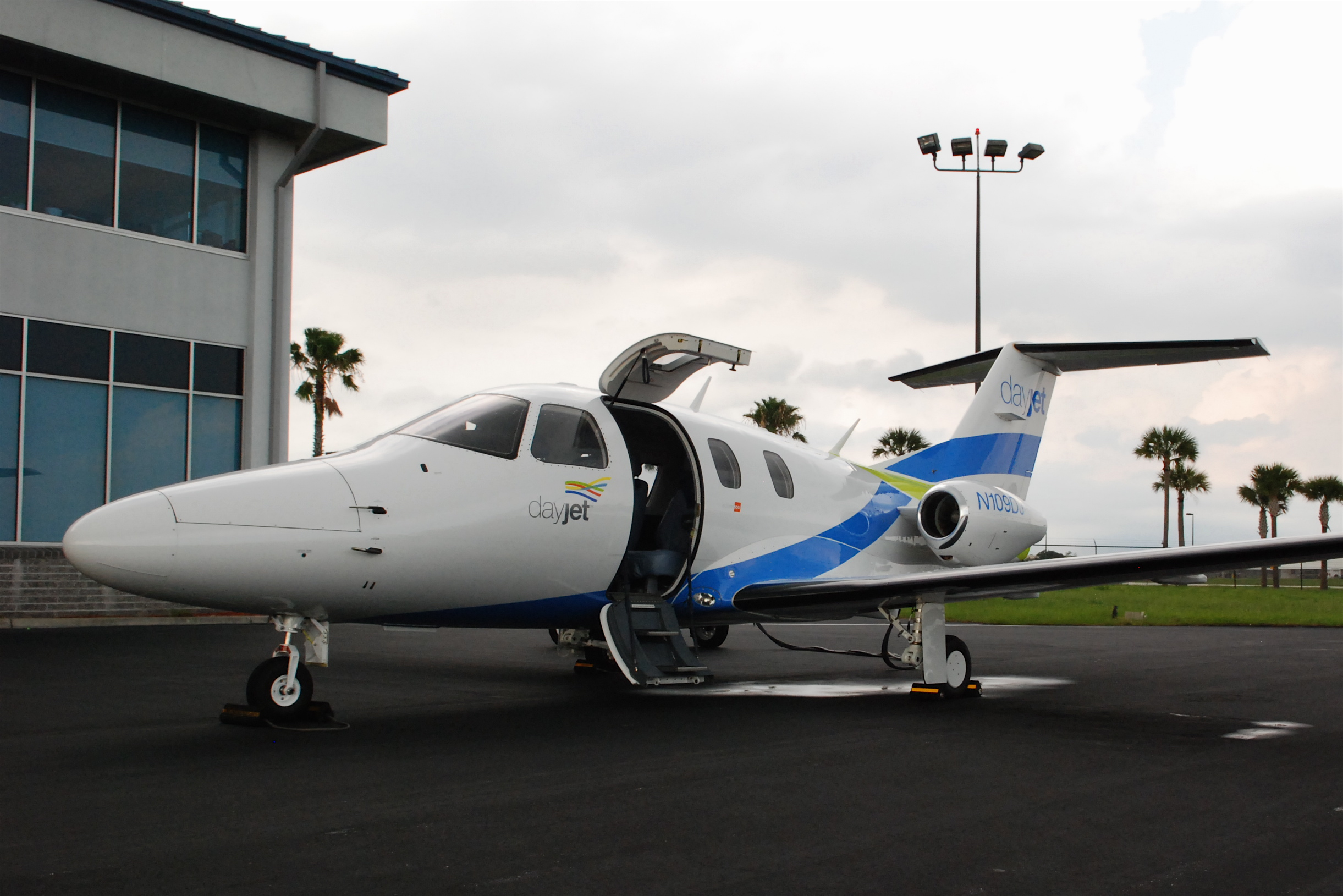
DayJet Eclipse 500 in 2007

On 6 May 2008, air taxi operator DayJet announced that it had scaled back its operations, laying off 100–160 employees in all segments of the company and selling or leasing out 16 of its fleet of 28 Eclipse 500s. DayJet founder and CEO Ed Iacobucci indicated at that time that the company needed US$40M to reach profitability, but the company couldn't raise that amount. Iacobucci stated that the company proved that the operational concept is sound, but that the DayJet fleet of 28 Eclipse 500s needed to be quickly expanded to 50 aircraft to attain profitability. With 1400 500s on order out of a claimed order book of about 2500 aircraft DayJet represented 58% of all Eclipses that had been ordered.

On September 19, 2008, DayJet suspended all passenger operations due to its inability to raise operating funds, and stating: The company's operations have also suffered as a result of Eclipse Aviation's failure to install missing equipment or functionality or repair agreed technical discrepancies in accordance with the terms of DayJet's aircraft purchase contract.

In October 2008, Eclipse Aviation put for sale the entire DayJet fleet of 28 aircraft.

Canadian light aircraft fractional aircraft company OurPlane bid on the entire DayJet fleet of aircraft, offering more than "$500,000 each but less than $1.5 million" each. OurPlane operated a fleet of mostly Cirrus SR22 aircraft up until its entry into bankruptcy in October 2010. The transaction was not completed, and OurPlane operated one Eclipse 500 up until its entry into bankruptcy.

=== Customer reception ===
Customer reception of the aircraft has been mixed. Industry analyst Richard Aboulafia wrote, despite some serious and expensive teething problems with many of the EA500s built so far, some pilots are quite enthusiastic about its flying characteristics and economical operating costs (although many other pilots consider it a dysfunctional mass of parts flying in loose formation).

Some owner-pilots have been quite enthusiastic about the aircraft. In a September 2008 article Eclipse 500 owner Ken Meyer wrote:

In a nutshell, while you can say any number of things about Eclipse Aviation and its many missteps, the plane is a great plane. It is folks. And whether you like the manufacturer or not, the plane will be around for a very long time to come because it's a very good, very efficient, very fast design.

You see, by the numbers alone, the plane is everything it was advertised to be...But what I didn't anticipate was how much raw fun the Eclipse would be to fly. Sure, every airplane is fun to fly, but the Eclipse makes you feel like a fighter pilot. It handles like a Mooney with jet engines. Tight and crisp, a sports car of the air...

361 knots, cruising in jet comfort above the weather at 37,000 feet while burning just 209 pounds per hour per side, a total of less than 62 gph. Fuel efficiency: 6.7 statute MPG. Know any other jets that can do that? That's better fuel efficiency than I was getting in my old piston plane!...

...Reliability? I've got over 40,000 miles on my plane since taking delivery in April. It's had maintenance—there were several delivery squawks that had to be fixed—but not a single flight has been cancelled due to a maintenance issue. I flew to Mexico in July with an author and photographer onboard. In my previous plane, I'd have worried that the story and photos would be about our breakdown in a foreign country. In the Eclipse, I had no doubt whatsoever the flight would go well. And sure enough it did.

Some aircrew flying the aircraft have been critical of the Eclipse 500, its systems and frequent failures. One corporate pilot who is captain type-rated in several FAR 121 and 135 aircraft and who has extensive flight hours on the Eclipse 500 said: When I have to fly the Eclipse, I am on the edge of my seat waiting for the next disaster to take place. For instance, I've been flying for over 30 years and have never had to go on emergency oxygen, except during routine training. Since flying the Eclipse, I've had to go on emergency oxygen twice now due to fumes in the cockpit and in the cabin. Eclipse seemingly has no idea how to fix these aircraft problems. Flying at 41,000 feet, you don't have much time to deal with these continuous, on-going, very serious issues. All I know is that every time I've had to fly the Eclipse, I'm truly scared.

== Specifications ==
Data from Eclipse Aviation: Specifications, Performance

General characteristics

- Crew: one or two pilots
- Capacity: 6 seats max (including flight deck) / 2,400 lb (1,089 kg) useful load
- Length: 33.5 ft (10.2 m)
- Wingspan: 37.9 ft (11.6 m)
- Height: 11.0 ft (3.4 m)
- Empty weight: 3,634 lb (1,648 kg)
- Max takeoff weight: 6,000 lb (2,722 kg)
- Fuel capacity: 251 US gal (950 L), 1,698 lb (770 kg)
- Powerplant: 2 × Pratt & Whitney Canada PW610F turbofan engines, 900 lbf (4.0 kN) thrust each ISA+15°C (86°F)

Performance

- Maximum speed: 370 kn (430 mph, 690 km/h) Max Cruise
- Stall speed: 69 kn (79 mph, 128 km/h) Vso
- Never exceed speed: 285 kn (328 mph, 528 km/h) indicated airspeed, Mmo 0.64 Mach
- Range: 1,125 nmi (1,295 mi, 2,084 km) NBAA: 100 nm alternate, 4 occupants
- Service ceiling: 41,001 ft (12,497 m)
- Rate of climb: 3,424 ft/min (17.39 m/s)
- Fuel consumption: 1.10 lb/mi (0.311 kg/km) (750 nmi trip at FL400)
- Takeoff distance: 2,345 ft (715 m)
- Landing distance: 2,250 ft (686 m)

== See also ==
- History of Eclipse Aviation

Related development

- Williams V-Jet II

Aircraft of comparable role, configuration, and era

- Adam A700
- Cessna Citation Mustang
- Cirrus Vision SF50
- Diamond D-Jet
- Embraer Phenom 100
- Honda HA-420 HondaJet
- Piper PA-47 PiperJet
- Stratos 714

Related lists

- List of very light jets
