= Goode Ski Technologies =

Sporting goods manufacturer based in Ogden, Utah

GOODE Ski Technologies
- Company type: Corporation
- Industry: Snow skiing / water skiing equipment
- Founded: 1975
- Founder: Dave Goode
- Headquarters: Ogden, Utah
- Products: Carbon fiber Skis and Ski Poles; Water Skis
- Owner: Chris Roberts
- Number of employees: 20-40
- Website: goode.com

GOODE Ski Technologies is a sporting goods manufacturing corporation headquartered in Ogden, Utah. Its main products are carbon fiber-based snow skis, ski poles, water skis, and accessories.

== History ==
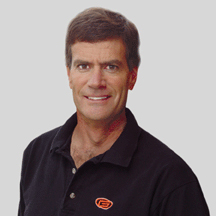
Dave Goode

Dave Goode founded GOODE Ski Technologies in 1975. During the first fifteen years, the then-Michigan-based company manufactured and marketed a full line of ski accessories.

In 1989, Goode patented a method for making carbon composite ski poles, and then in 1996, the company patented a carbon fiber composite ski.

In 2001, the company expanded its factory and purchased the production assets of Volant skis, and currently produces a full line of carbon fiber snow skis.

In 2004, the corporate headquarters was relocated to Ogden, Utah to be closer to world-class snow and water skiing facilities and culture.

In 2008, the company was granted a 30-year lease of Ogden's 21st Street Pond at no cost. In exchange, the company agreed to maintain their headquarters in Ogden, and use the pond for research and development activities. This agreement has been a point of contention in the local government since it largely restricts the public's access to a city-owned body of water.

On January 15, 2020, the founder, Dave Goode, died in a small plane crash near Roy, Utah. Goode is survived by his parents, wife, four children, and two granddaughters.
