= Williams EJ22 =

Small turbofan engine

EJ22
- Type: Turbofan
- National origin: United States
- Manufacturer: Williams International
- First run: 2000

The Williams EJ22 was a small turbofan engine that was being developed by Williams International for very light jet (VLJ) aircraft applications.

== Development ==
Williams International had been building small turbofan engines for cruise missile applications since the 1960s, and had successfully entered the general aviation market in 1992 with the FJ44 engine. That same year, NASA initiated a program, Advanced General Aviation Transport Experiments (AGATE), to partner with manufacturers and help develop technologies that would revitalize the sagging general aviation industry. In 1996, Williams joined AGATE's General Aviation Propulsion (GAP) program to develop a clean-sheet fuel-efficient turbofan engine that would be even smaller than the FJ44 and designated the FJX-2 engine. This provided $100 million in research and development funding for the new engine.

Initially, Williams contracted with Burt Rutan's Scaled Composites to design and build the Williams V-Jet II, a Very Light Jet (VLJ) to use as a testbed and technology demonstrator to showcase the new engine. The aircraft, powered by two interim FJX-1 man-rated version of Williams' cruise-missile engine, debuted at the 1997 Oshkosh Airshow. Development of the FJX-2 engine progressed, most of the design work was completed during 1998 with initial prototype parts being delivered in the second quarter of that year. The program ultimately culminated with altitude testing at the NASA Glenn Research Propulsion Systems Laboratory from March - April 2000.

In 2000, Williams joined with Eclipse Aviation to develop an FAA-certified version of the FJX-2, designated the EJ22, to be used on the Eclipse 500 VLJ due for first flight in June 2002. The new EJ22 powered the Eclipse 500 prototype on its first flight in the summer of 2002, but never flew with the EJ22 again and Eclipse terminated their contract in late 2002, stating: "The EJ22 is not a viable solution for the Eclipse 500 aircraft, and Williams International has not met its contractual obligations", while Williams acknowledged "a number of challenges" with the EJ22 but viewed its obligations as accomplished, implying that the aircraft was too heavy. Eclipse switched to the more powerful Pratt & Whitney Canada PW600 series. Following termination of the contract, development work and FAA certification was halted shortly thereafter. Eclipse initially required the engine to produce 770 lbf (3,400 N) thrust, exceeding the 700 lbf (3,100 N) rating of the FJX-2 by 10%.

== Design ==
The FJX-2 engine was designed with many experimental systems and manufacturing processes to minimize parts count, lower production costs and have a bypass ratio of 4:1. As a result, there were many technical difficulties and failures of the initial prototype hardware. However, subsequent re-designs and the incorporation of more conventional systems resulted in the engine eventually meeting the NASA requirement of 700 lbf (3,100 N) thrust.

To achieve the required thrust-specific fuel consumption, the EJ22 turbofan was designed as a three spool engine having a fan, two axial compressors and three expansion turbines. As a result, the engine was significantly more complicated than any prior Williams International engine. While very impressive on the test stand, the EJ22 proved quite temperamental during the two years of its development process and it was frequently subject to problems starting, overheating, part failures and various subsystem issues.

== Specifications ==
Data from NASA

==== General characteristics ====
- Type: 3-spool medium-bypass ratio turbofan
- Length: 41 in (104 cm)
- Diameter: 14.5 in (37 cm)
- Dry weight: 96 lb (44 kg)

==== Components ====
- Compressor: 1 fan, nine stages of axial compression, 5-stage HP
- Combustors: annular
- Turbine: LP, IP and HP axial turbines
- Fuel type: aviation kerosene

==== Performance ====
- Maximum thrust: 722 lbf (3,210 N)
- Bypass ratio: 4:1
- Thrust-to-weight ratio: 7.52
