= Embraer Phenom 100 =

Very light business jet

EMB-500 Phenom 100
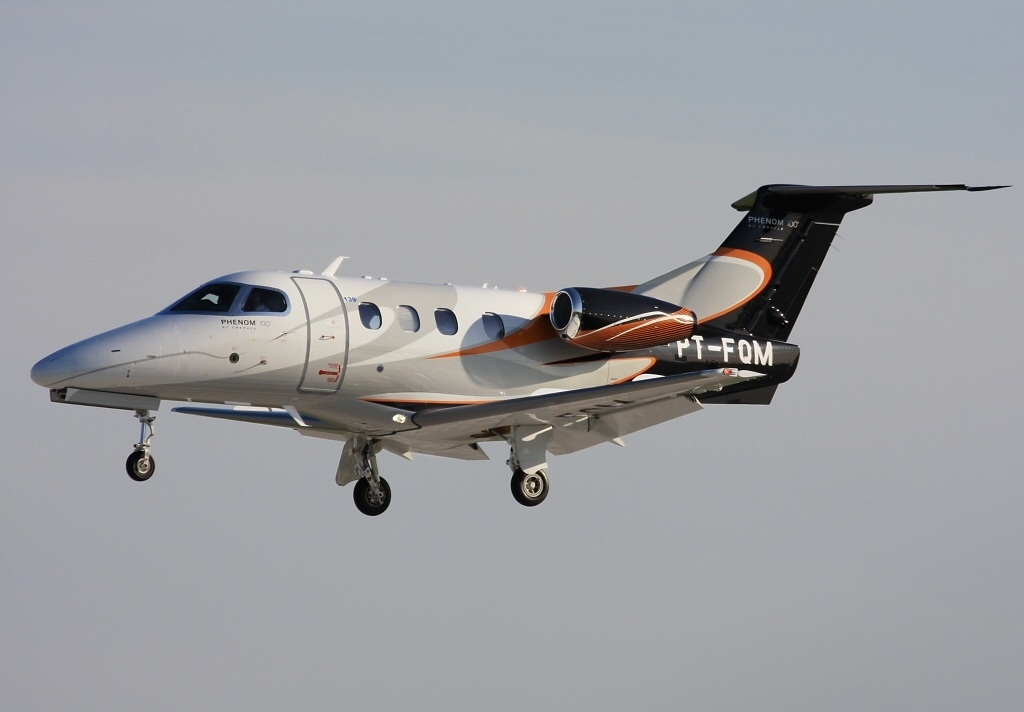
- Phenom 100 with gear and flaps deployed

General information
- Type: Very light business jet
- National origin: Brazil
- Manufacturer: Embraer
- Status: In production, in service
- Number built: 441 (as of Q3 2026)

History
- Manufactured: December 2008–present
- First flight: 26 July 2007
- Variant: Embraer Phenom 300

The Embraer EMB-500 Phenom 100 is a very light (VLJ) business jet designed and produced by the Brazilian aircraft manufacturer Embraer. Announced in November 2005, it made its first flight on 26 July 2007 and was awarded a type certificate in December 2008; the first aircraft was delivered the same month. The Phenom 100 has been stretched into the larger Embraer Phenom 300. Powered by two rear-mounted Pratt & Whitney Canada PW600 turbofan engines, it can transport four to seven passengers, with a range of 1,178 nautical miles [nmi] (2,182 km; 1,356 mi) with four occupants.

== Development ==
During April 2005, Embraer's board of directors approved the development of very light and light jets. Within ten years, it was hoped that the company could become a major provider for the global business jet market. On 9 November of that year, the company announced at the annual NBAA convention the name of its very light jet, the Phenom 100, and displayed a full-scale mock-up of the aircraft. The company stated that it was actively exploring opportunities for the Phenom 100 to be used as an air taxi. Embraer also opted to increase personnel on its business jet division. That same month, Embraer announced that it had selected Garmin Aviation's G1000 electronic flight instrument system (EFIS) to be installed in the cockpit of its new jet.

In March 2006, Embraer announced it had completed the aircraft's digital definition phase of development. That same month, the company augmented its sales efforts with several full-sized mockups of the Phenom 100. That April, expanded plans for the aircraft's production were revealed along with a 3.5% increase in the unit price. The company reportedly aimed to secure 30% of the global market for very light jets. In May 2006, it was announced at the EBACE conference that 50 orders for the Phenom 100 had been secured. Two months later, Embraer released more details on the pending initial operators for the aircraft. In August 2006, the first order from a customer in Latin America was received.

During October 2006, the American engine manufacturer Pratt & Whitney had commenced testing of the PW617-F turbofan engines intended for the Phenom 100. In March 2007, development of the aircraft was reportedly proceeding to schedule, Embraer took delivery of the first PW617-F engines that same month. The following April, the mating between the wing and fuselage of the first aircraft occurred as its assembly neared completion. In June 2007, the prototype was officially rolled out and ground testing of the aircraft commenced shortly thereafter.

On 26 July 2007, the prototype Phenom 100 performed its maiden flight from the company's facility in São José dos Campos, Brazil. Two weeks later, it was transferred to Gaviao Peixoto, where the majority of the flight test programme was conducted. In March 2008, it was announced that serial production of the aircraft would commence in the following month. During flight testing, issues with the aircraft's ice protection system and flaps were uncovered. During December 2008, the Phenom 100 was awarded its type certificate by both Brazil's National Civil Aviation Authority and the United States' Federal Aviation Administration. The aircraft is certified as the EMB-500. The first Phenom 100 delivery took place on 24 December 2008.

== Design ==
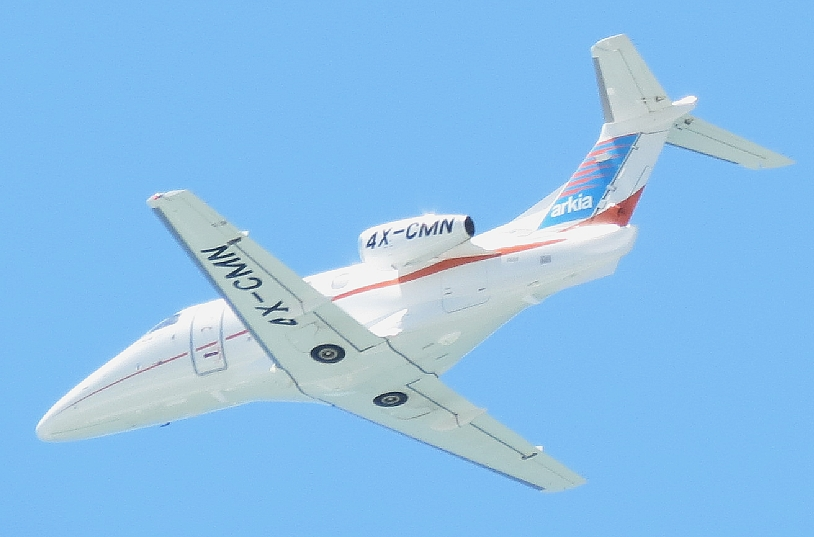
Airborne from below, clean configuration, showing its straight wing

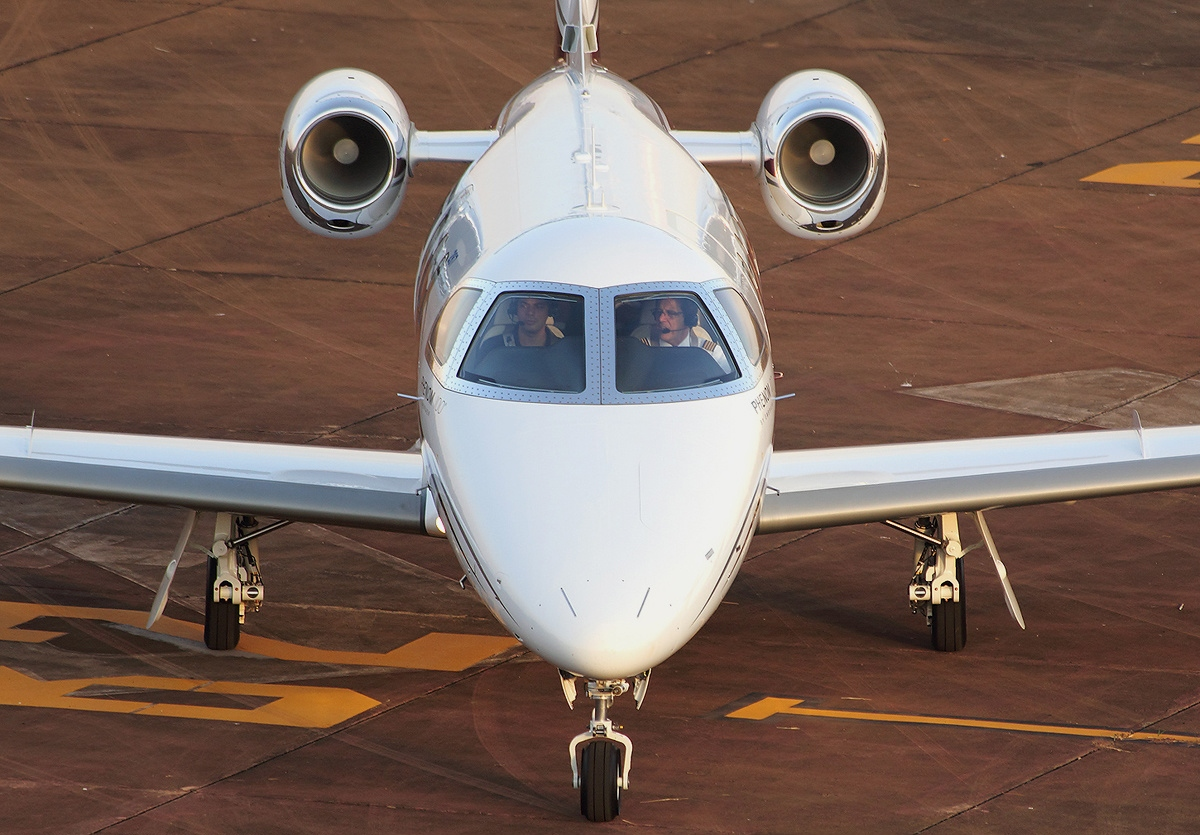
Front view

The Embraer Phenom 100 is a low wing cantilever monoplane with a T-tail and a retractable tricycle landing gear. It has an oval fuselage with a 7.985 m^{3} (282 ft^{3}) passenger cabin, a 1.47 m-high by 0.74 m-wide (4.5'x2.1') door and 1.2'x1' windows. Its unpressurized cargo hold is 1.56 m^{3} (54.9ft^{3}). Its structural life is 28,000 flight cycles or 35,000 hours, and it is built of 20% composite materials. Although the Phenom 100 has capacity for four passengers in its normal configuration, it can carry up to seven passengers with a single crew, with an optional side-facing seat and belted toilet. The cabin interior is designed by BMW DesignworksUSA.

The aircraft is powered by a pair of rear-mounted Pratt & Whitney Canada PW617-F turbofan engines, each rated to generate a takeoff thrust of 7.2 kN (1,695 lb) at ISA+10 °C. These engines have dual full authority digital engine controls (FADEC). In the event of a single engine failure during takeoff, an automatic performance reserve (APR) function augments engine output to 1,777 lb. Later model PW 617 F–E models have a ten-minute thrust rating at 1,820 lb. To reduce operator costs, condition-based maintenance practices have been explored in addition to traditional scheduled routines. The Phenom 100 has a maximum flying range of 1,178 nmi (2,182 km; 1,356 mi) with four occupants and NBAA IFR Reserves.

== Variants ==
EMB-500
Embraer designation.
Phenom 100
Initial production variant, marketing name for the EMB-500 with G1000 Avionics and two PW617F-E engines.
Phenom 100E
Updated variant including multifunction spoilers. Marketing name for the EMB-500 with G1000 avionics and PW617F-E engines and spoiler panels.
Phenom 100EV Evolution
Weight savings and thrust increase from 1,695lb to 1,730lb shortening time to climb to 41,000ft from 33min to 25min and reducing takeoff distance at high-altitude and high-temperature airports from 6,609ft to 5,663ft, Garmin G3000 touch-screen flightdeck at a $4.495 million list price. It was first delivered on 31 March 2017. Marketing name for the EMB-500 with G3000 avionics and PW617F1-E engines.
Phenom 100EX
Updated in 2023 with cabin and avionics improvements including runway overrun awareness and alerting system (ROAAS).

U-100
Brazilian military designation for two Phenom 100EVs.

Phenom T1
United Kingdom military designation for Phenom 100s operated by the Royal Air Force.

== Operators ==
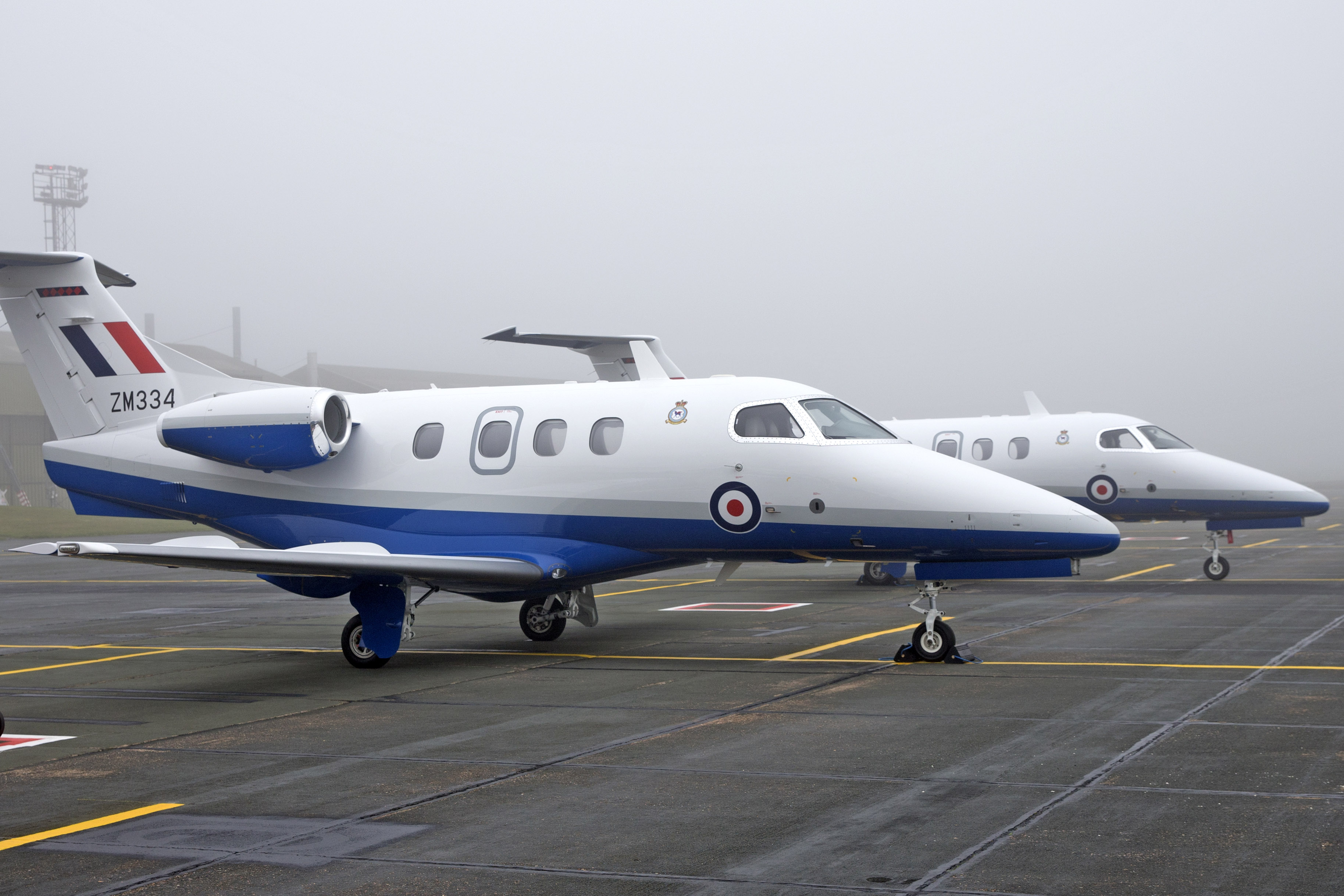
No. 45 Squadron RAF in 2018

The Phenom 100 has been operated by a variety of users, including private individuals, companies, fractionals, charter operators, aircraft management companies, and military operators.

=== Civilian ===
United Arab Emirates

- Emirates – five Phenom 100EV aircraft for cadet training. Used for charter operations beginning in 2023.

=== Military ===
Brazil

- Brazilian Air Force – two aircraft delivered in October 2019 and designated U-100.

Pakistan

- Pakistan Air Force – four aircraft for transporting VIPs.

United Kingdom

- Royal Air Force – Operated as part of the UK Military Flying Training System. On 2 February 2016 the UK Ministry of Defence signed a contract with KBR-Elbit Systems for the procurement and support of five Embraer Phenom 100 jets to train Royal Air Force and Royal Navy air crew until 2033.

=== State ===
The Texas Department of Transportation operates a fleet of four.

== Deliveries ==
Embraer was originally planning to deliver 15 Phenom 100s during 2008 and 120–150 aircraft in 2009, however, the company would actually deliver only two aircraft in 2008 and had to reduce its 2009 plan to 97 aircraft. By late 2014, Embraer reportedly had roughly 30 orders outstanding for the aircraft.

In mid-2008, it was announced that a new Phenom assembly line would be established in Melbourne, Florida, to serve the North American market. It was subsequently announced that all final assembly work would be transferred to the Florida facility from July 2016; it is reportedly capable of assembling up to 96 Phenoms and 72 Embraer Legacy 450/Embraer Legacy 500 annually. More than 170 Phenom jets have been produced at the site until June 2016, mainly for the US market. The company had two production lines for the Phenom 100EV, the other in Brazil. By November 2016, Brazilian production was on track to be entirely replaced by the Melbourne line.

Year	2008	2009	2010	2011	2012	2013	2014	2015	2016	2017	2018	2019	2020	2021	2022	2023	2024	2025	2026	Total
Number of deliveries	2	97	100	41	29	30	19	12	10	18	11	11	6	6	7	11	10	14	7	441

== Incidents and accidents ==
The Phenom 100 was involved in nine hull losses, including a single fatal accident.

On 8 December 2014, a Phenom 100 with tail number N100EQ crashed into a suburban home in Gaithersburg, Maryland, while on approach to the runway at Montgomery County Airpark. Six people were killed; all three on board the plane, and three more in the home on the ground. The National Transportation Safety Board (NTSB) investigation have concluded that the probable cause of the accident was a pilot's misconduct related to not turning the deice system and inappropriate landing performance speeds for the weather conditions and airplane weight. They recommended the development of a system that can automatically alert pilots when the ice protection should be activated on turbofan airplanes that are certified for single-pilot operation.

== Specifications (Phenom 100EV) ==
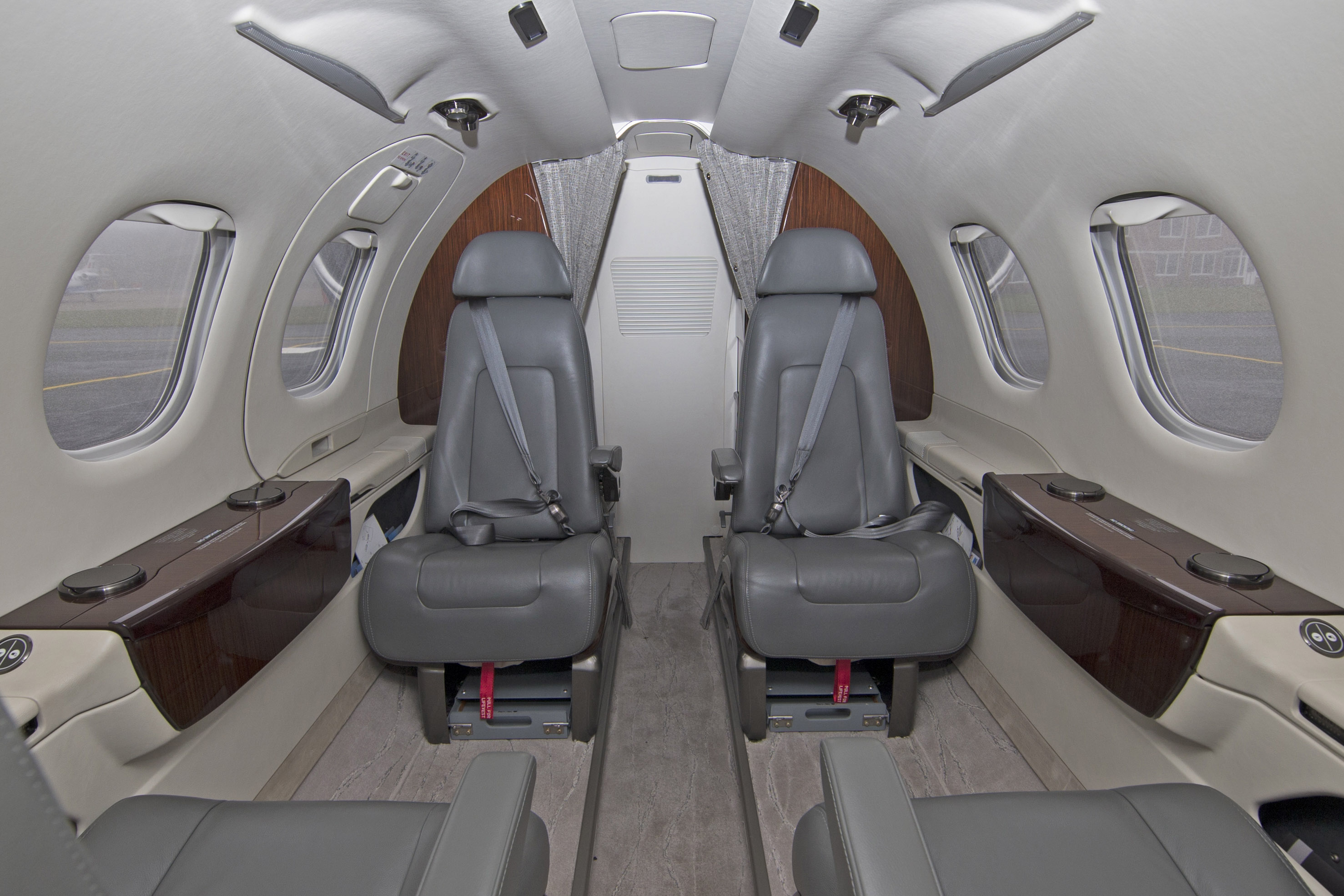
Cabin

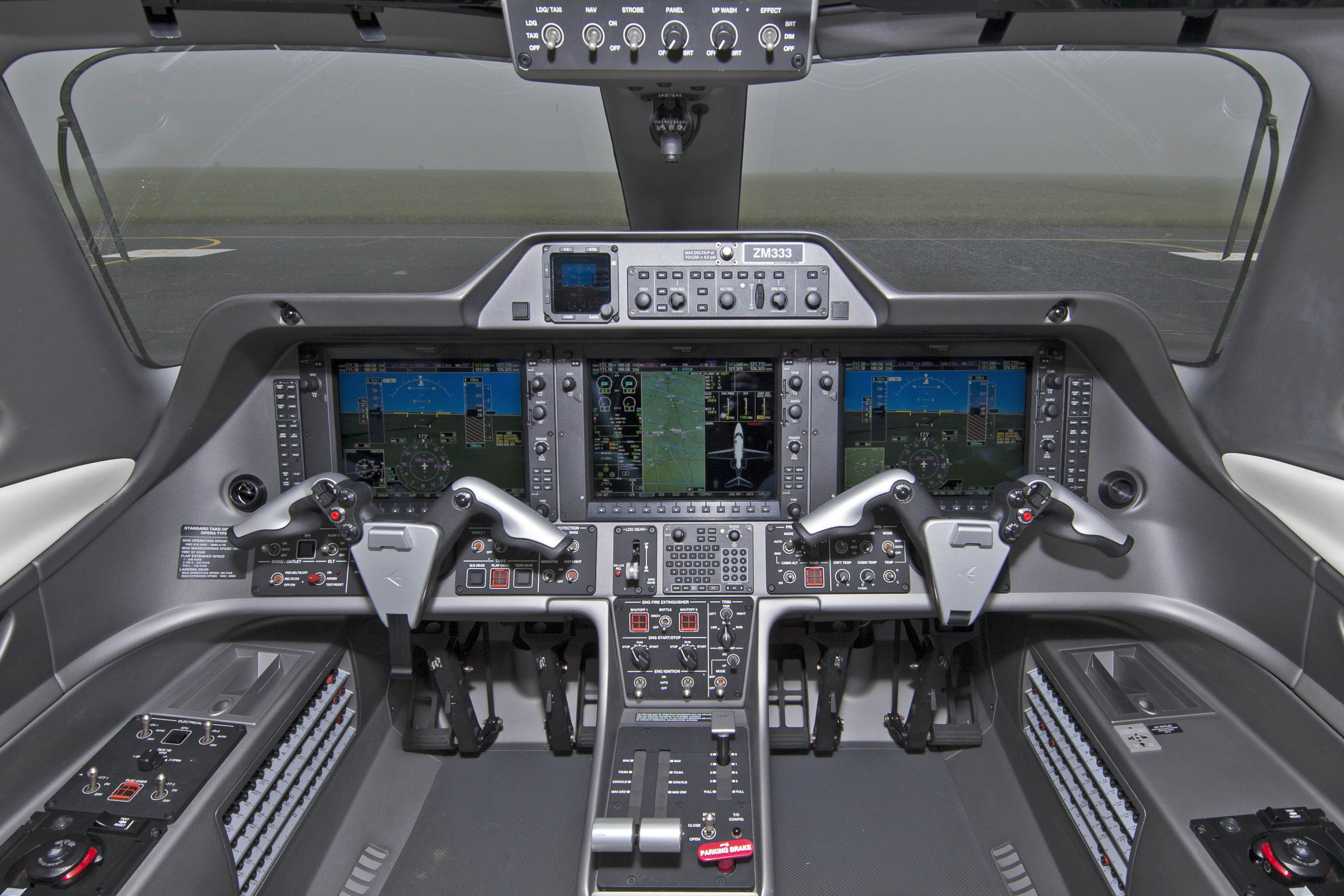
Phenom 100 cockpit

Data from Embraer Phenom 100EV brochure

General characteristics

- Crew: 1 or 2 pilots
- Capacity: 4 or 5 passengers (standard configurations); 7 passengers maximum (with passenger in cockpit, optional side-facing seat, and optional belted lavatory)
- Length: 12.82 m (42 ft 1 in)
- Wingspan: 12.3 m (40 ft 4 in)
- Height: 4.35 m (14 ft 3 in)
- Wing area: 18.76 m^{2} (201.9 sq ft)
- Empty weight: 3,275 kg (7,220 lb)
- Max takeoff weight: 4,800 kg (10,582 lb)
- Fuel capacity: 1,272 kg (2,804 lb)
- Cabin height: 1.5 m (4 ft 11 in)
- Cabin length: 3.35 m (11 ft)
- Powerplant: 2 × Pratt & Whitney Canada PW617F1-E turbofan engines, 7.7 kN (1,730 lbf) thrust each at ISA + 8°C

Performance

- Maximum speed: Mach 0.7
- Cruise speed: 750 km/h (470 mph, 400 kn)
- Minimum control speed: 180 km/h (110 mph, 97 kn)
- Range: 2,182 km (1,356 mi, 1,178 nmi) (LRC, four 91 kg (200 lb) occupants, NBAA IFR reserves with 185 km (115 mi; 100 nmi) alternate)
- Service ceiling: 12,497 m (41,001 ft)
- Cabin altitude: 2,438 m (8,000 ft) at 12,497 m (41,000 ft)
- Take-off run: 975 m (3,199 ft) (MTOW, SL, ISA)
- Landing run: 741 m (2,431 ft) (SL, ISA, four 91 kg (200 lb) occupants, NBAA IFR reserves with 185 km (115 mi; 100 nmi) alternate)
- Hourly fuel burn (1,111 km (690 mi; 600 nmi) trip, four 91 kg (200 lb) occupants, NBAA IFR Reserves. SL Takeoff, ISA)
  - 1st hour – 414 L/h (109 gal/h; 91 imp gal/h) (take-off and climb to cruise)
  - 2nd hour – 292 L/h (77 gal/h; 64 imp gal/h) (cruise)

Avionics
Embraer "Prodigy Touch" Flight Deck (based on Garmin G3000)

== See also ==
Related development

- Embraer Phenom 300

Aircraft of comparable role, configuration, and era

- Eclipse 500 / 550
- Cessna Citation Mustang
- Cessna Citation M2
- HondaJet

Related lists

- List of very light jets
