= Pratt & Whitney Canada PW600 =

Canadian series of aircraft engines

PW600
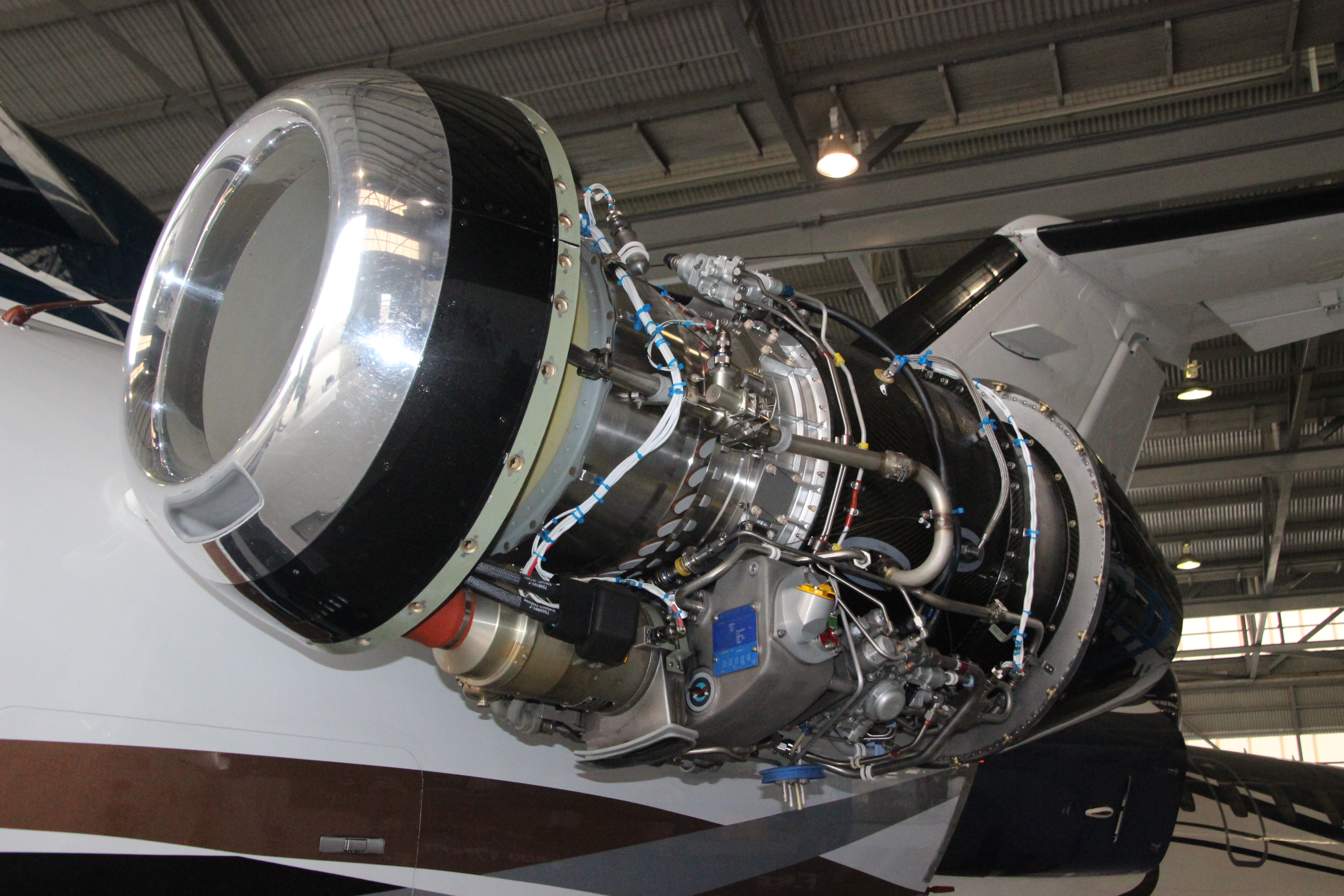
- PW615F-A with some of its cowlings removed for maintenance
- Type: Turbofan
- National origin: Canada
- Manufacturer: Pratt & Whitney Canada
- First run: 31 October 2001
- Major applications: Cessna Citation Mustang; Eclipse 500; Embraer Phenom 100

The Pratt & Whitney Canada PW600 series is a family of small turbofan engines developed by Pratt & Whitney Canada producing between 900 to 3,000 lbf (4.0 to 13.3 kN) of thrust and powering the Eclipse 500/550, the Cessna Citation Mustang and the Embraer Phenom 100.

== Development ==
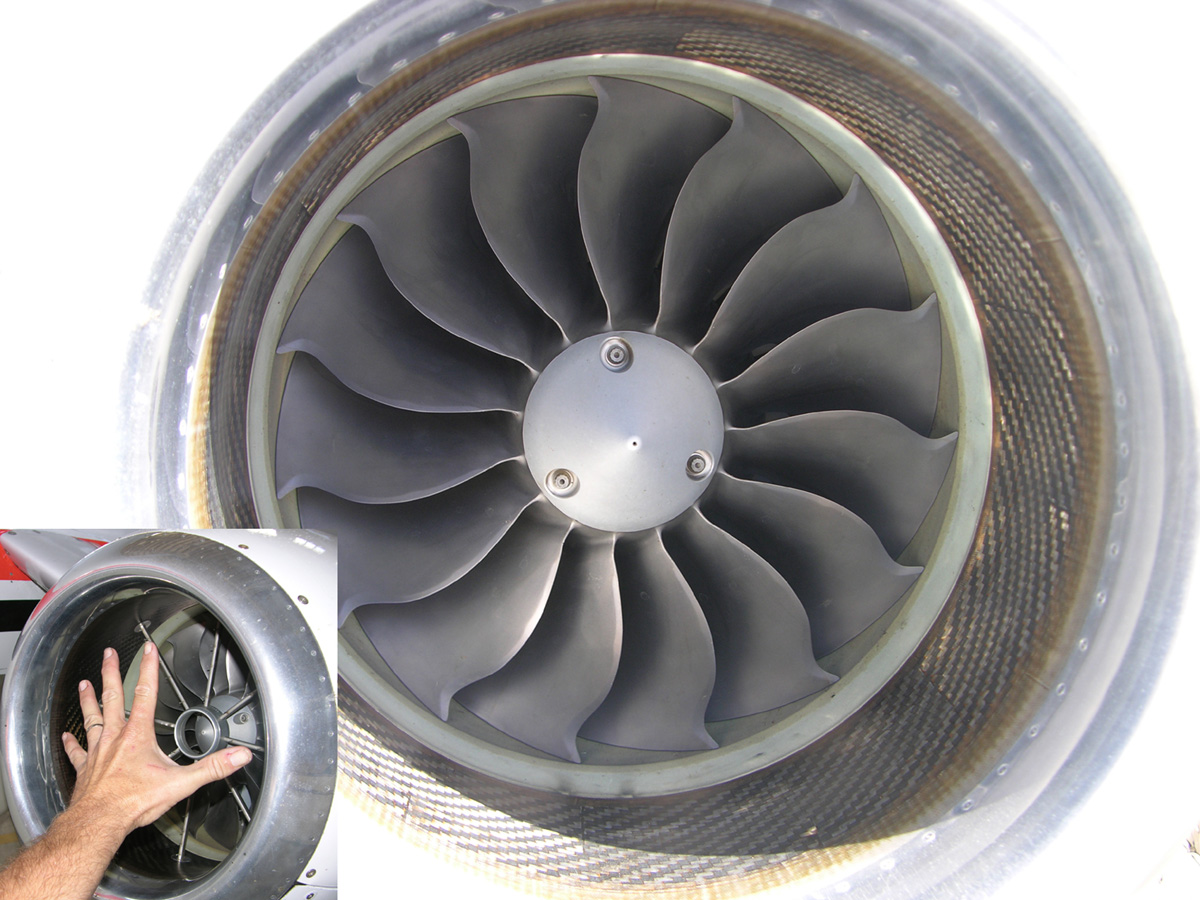
PW610F fan, human hand for scale in inset

The 2,500 lbf (11 kN) thrust PW625F demonstrator engine was first run on 31 October 2001. It flew in late 2002.

In 2002, the PW610F was selected for the Eclipse 500 twinjet, replacing the EJ22 as Williams was unable to reach sufficient reliability. The 950 lbf (4.2 kN) thrust engine was certified by Transport Canada on 27 July 2006. The aircraft received a preliminary certification on 27 July 2006 and was first delivered on 31 December 2006. The Eclipse 500 production was halted in October 2008 after 260 were delivered, and 33 of the updated Eclipse 550 were delivered between 2014 and 2017.

The larger PW615F was selected to power the Cessna Citation Mustang in January 2003. The 1,460 lbf (6.5 kN) thrust engine was certified on June 26, 2006. The aircraft was certified on 8 September 2006, and deliveries began on November 22. Production ended in 2017 after 479 aircraft were built. This engine was to be used in the Eclipse 400 before it was cancelled, derated to 1,200 lbf (5.3 kN) thrust.

The largest PW617F was selected for the Embraer Phenom 100 in May 2005, design work began in July 2005, it first ran on 29 June 2006 and first flew in mid-October 2006. The 1,615 lbf (7.18 kN) thrust engine was certified on 9 september 2008. The aircraft was certified in December 2008 and was first delivered on 24 December. By the end of 2021, 392 Phenom 100s had been delivered.

== Design ==
The two spool turbofan has a single front fan powered by a single stage turbine, a compressor with a mixed flow first stage (a diagonal compressor) and a centrifugal second stage powered by a single stage HP turbine and a reverse flow combustor. This configuration was described in a PW&C patent filed on 6 October 2000.

The fan is a snubberless design, with wide chord blades integral with the rotor hub, and the design features a forced mixer/common exhaust. Hispano-Suiza Canada designed and manufactures the dual channel FADEC.

== Variants ==
PW610F
PW615F
PW617F

== Applications ==
- Cessna Citation Mustang
- Eclipse 400
- Eclipse 500
- Embraer Phenom 100

== Specifications ==
Model	PW610	PW615	PW617
Configuration	two spool, reverse flow combustor, dual channel FADEC		
Compressor	LP: single front fan, HP: one stage mixed flow and one stage centrifugal		
Turbine	single stage LP, single stage HP		
Thrust	4.226 kN (950 lbf)	6.49 kN (1,460 lbf)	8.411 kN (1,891 lbf)
Weight	115.7 kg (255 lb)	140 kg (310 lb)	172 kg (379 lb)
Diameter	704 mm (27.7 in)	750 mm (30 in)	
Length	1,153 mm (45.4 in)	1,258 mm (49.5 in)	1,360 mm (54 in)
RPM (100%)	LP 22100, HP 48000	LP 21830, HP 44040	LP 19845, HP 40040
Bypass ratio	1.83	2.8	2.7
Fan diameter	14.5 in (368 mm)	16.03 in (407 mm)	17.7 in (450 mm)
Application	Eclipse 500/550	Citation Mustang	Phenom 100

== See also ==
Related lists

- List of aircraft engines
