= History of Eclipse Aviation =

American aircraft manufacturer history

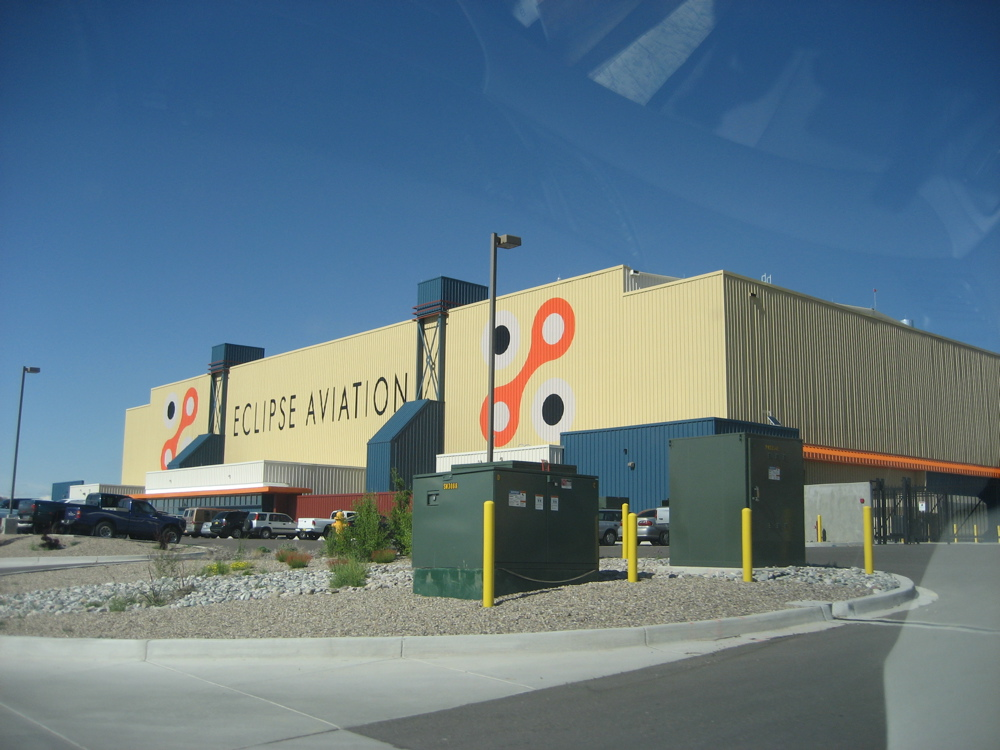
Eclipse Aviation plant, Albuquerque, New Mexico, September 2007

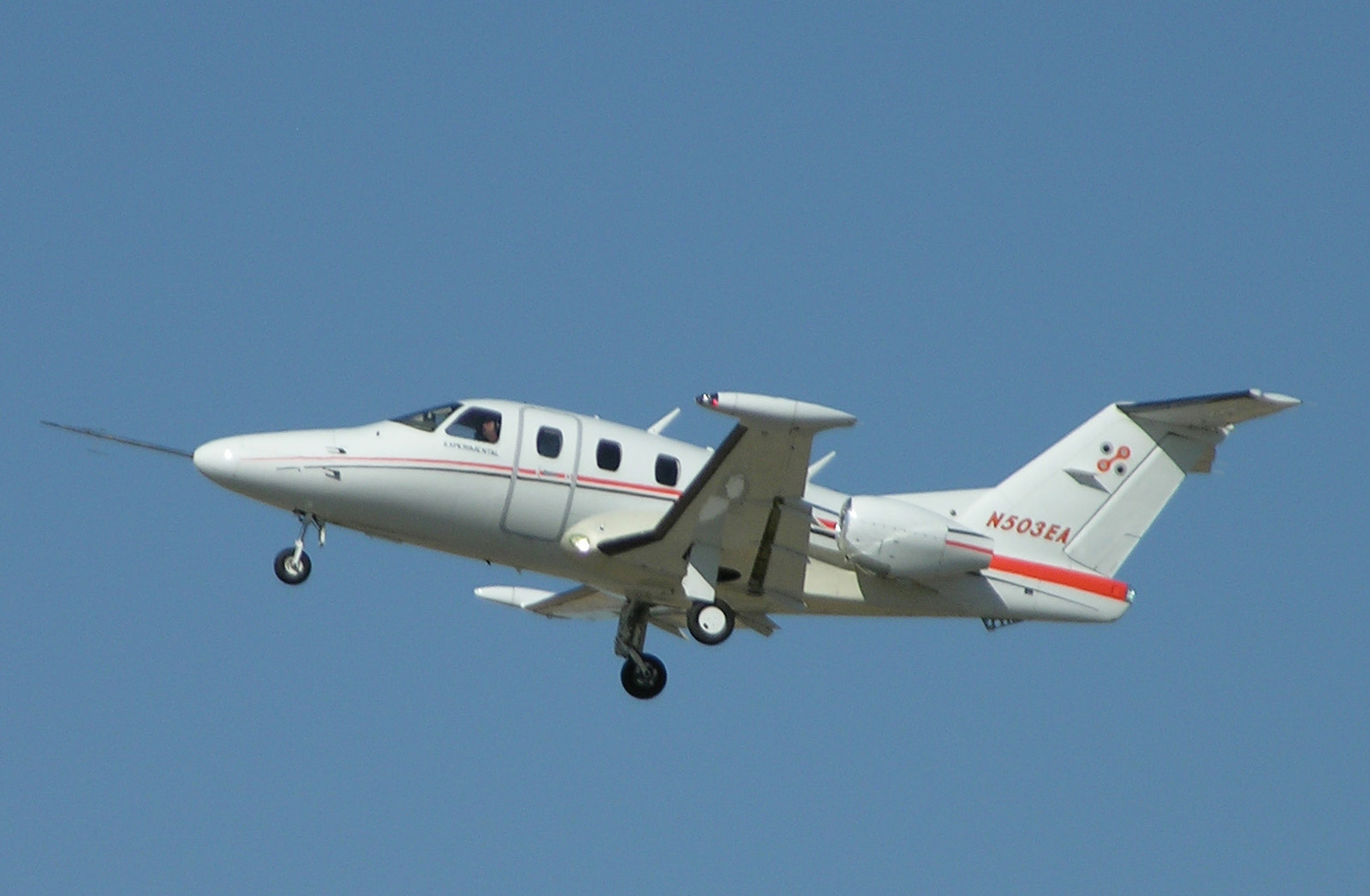
Eclipse 500

The history of Eclipse Aviation is the story of the largest financial failure in the history of general aviation, one that experts have predicted will leave a lasting impact on the aerospace industry.

It runs from the company's startup in 1998 to the design and testing of the Eclipse 500 very light jet (VLJ) through 2006, to the production of 260 examples from 2006–2008, development of the Eclipse 400 single-engined jet from 2007–2008, the most deliveries of a VLJ in a single year to date with over 150 Eclipse 500s sold in the first three quarters of 2008, and ultimately to the company's downfall in the latter part of 2008 and dissolution in bankruptcy in 2009, referred to by many in the media at the time as the "billion-dollar debacle". The story also involves shorter-lived ventures following its 2009 bankruptcy, as well as the introduction of the Eclipse 550 VLJ in 2014.

== Significance ==
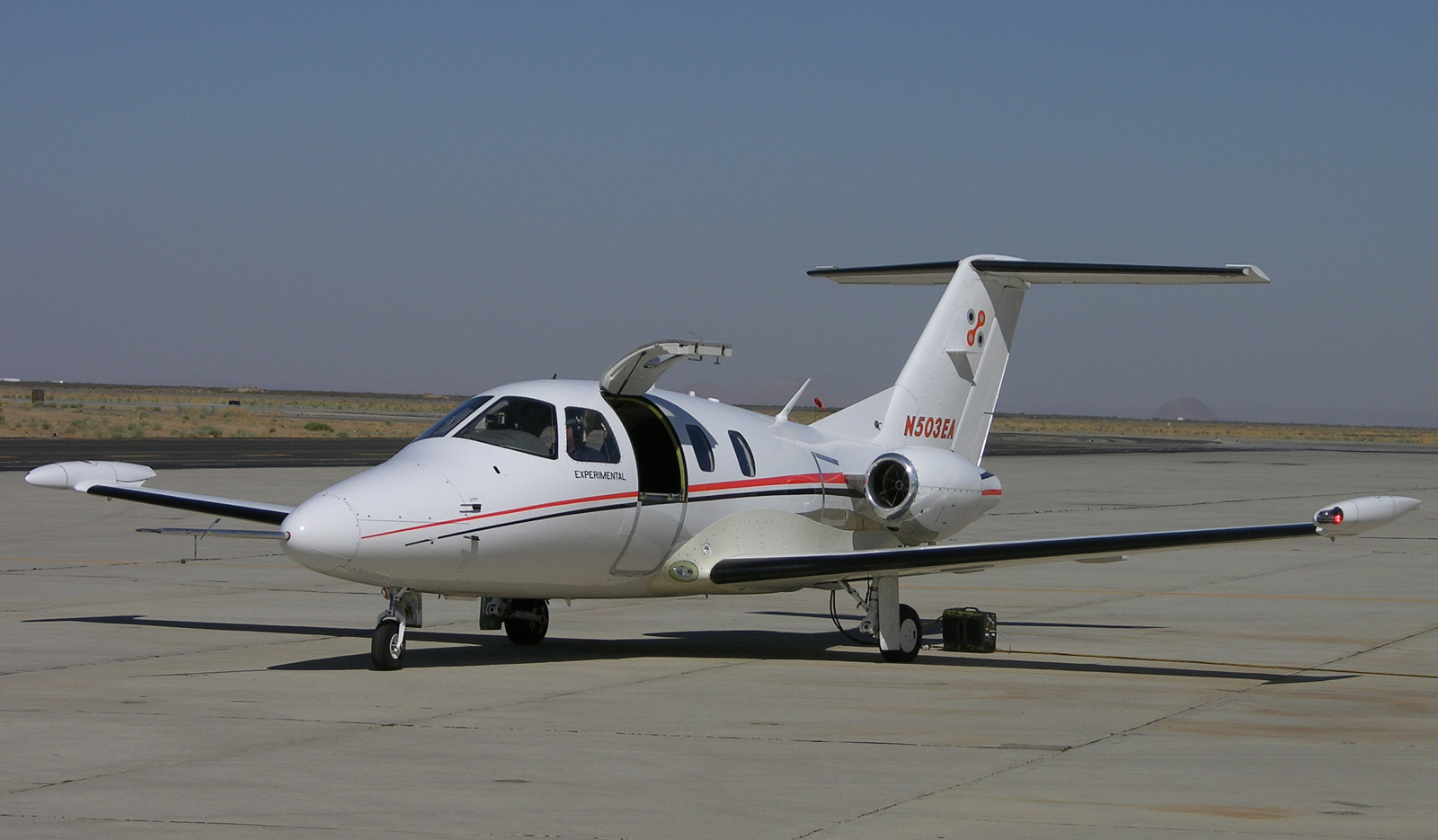
Eclipse 500 flight test aircraft at Mojave

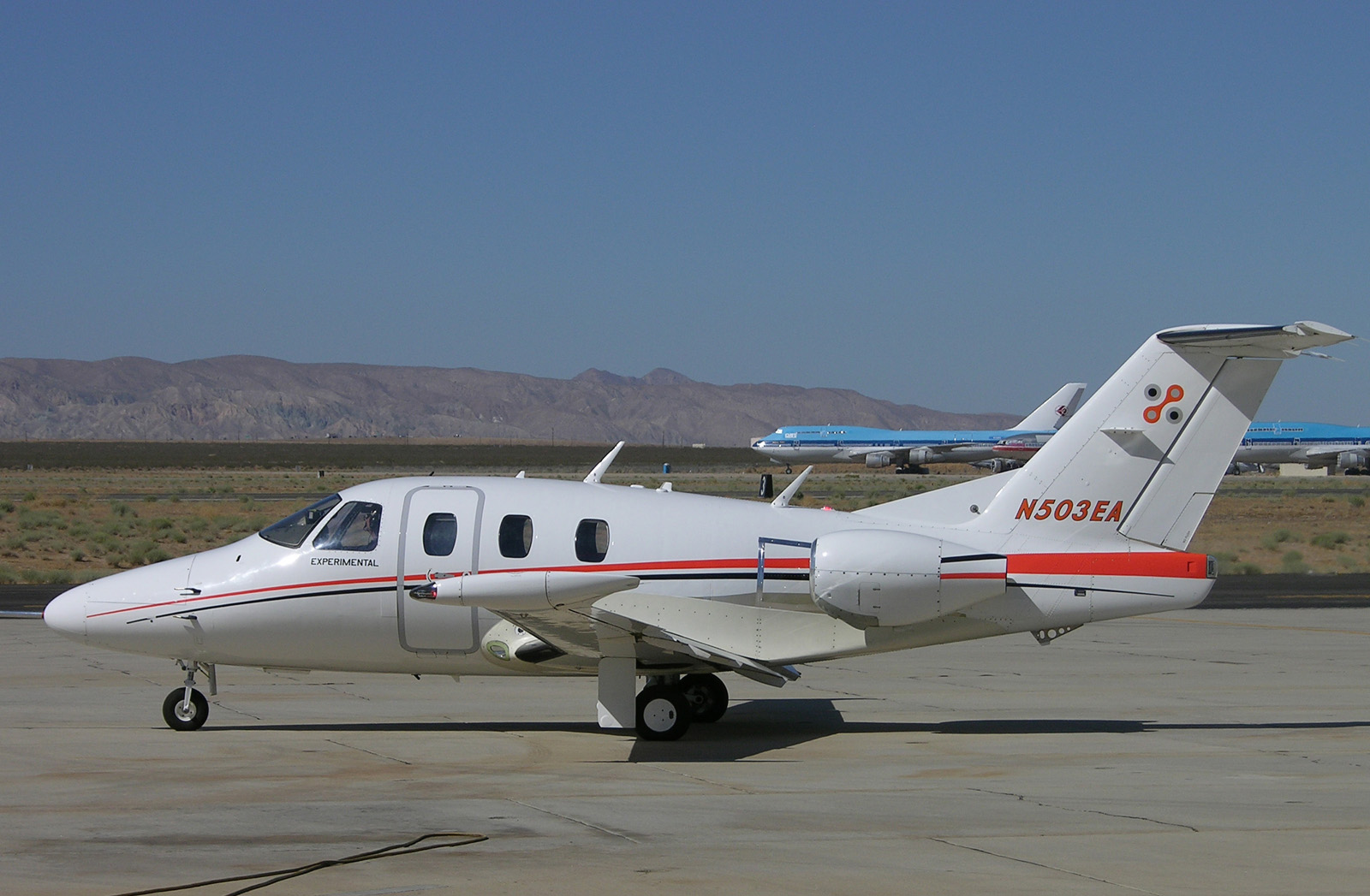
Flight test aircraft at Mojave

Aviation analysts are still tallying the impact that the company will have on 21st Century aviation.

J. Mac McClellan, Editor in Chief of Flying Magazine, in February 2009 summarized the significance of Eclipse:

... investors, suppliers, Eclipse 500 owners and order holders lost well over $1 billion. There has never been a financial failure of this scale in the entire history of general aviation. Eclipse investors have lost hundreds of millions, but individuals are also big losers. Anybody who had a deposit for an airplane lost the money. And anybody who took delivery of the 260 or so airplanes to leave the factory has lost all warranties and the promises to modify the airplane to a final and usable status ... The Eclipse episode is the biggest disaster in memory for GA because it took more than a billion dollars that could have been used to create new and viable airplanes and wasted it. And the trauma will linger for years as investors, rightly terrified by the Eclipse disaster, refuse to put money into new airplane programs that can really work.

Richard Aboulafia, Vice President, Analysis, Teal Group in his consultant's report on Eclipse of October 2008 said:

The Eclipse program was designed from the outset to be revolutionary and unique. In Teal Group's estimation, the people behind Eclipse have attained this objective. This program is the single worst aviation program Teal Group has ever covered.

It isn't the aircraft itself. Rather, it was a business plan that makes no sense, except to attract investors who don't know much about the aviation business. The plan called for 1,000 deliveries per year. As a reference point, in 2007 the world's manufacturers delivered a total of about 4,000 turbine-powered aircraft of all types and models. This one company, an unknown start-up, proposed to grow that global figure by 25%, admitting that it couldn't survive if it merely built 450 planes per year (100 aircraft more than any other turbine-powered aircraft model).

The formula was remarkably simple. A completely unrealistic production rate was predicated on an unrealistically low price (less than $800,000, at first). That impossibly low price was predicated on the unrealistically high production numbers. This formula (promoted as a revolutionary paradigm) worked, as long as people gave Eclipse money. As soon as they stopped (which has been happening for the past 12 months), reality caught up to Eclipse ...

AVweb Editor-in-Chief Russ Niles stated:

[Eclipse CEOs] Raburn and then Roel Pieper, who toppled him in a palace coup worthy of the finest Flashman novel, have spent the last six years explaining, apologizing, maneuvering and, ultimately, cutting and running on buyers, investors and employees who believed an impossible dream.

The failure of Eclipse has even changed the language of aviation. By late 2009 the term Very Light Jet had become so tainted by Eclipse's "billion-dollar debacle" who trumpeted that term widely, that most manufacturers were avoiding use of the term to describe their products. The NBAA's Brian Foley explained "The term VLJ was at times tainted by ... unrealistic expectations and even failure. The industry would do well to drop hyped words in order to improve credibility with users." Cessna never used the term to describe its Mustang, Embraer labels its Phenom 100 an "entry-level jet" and Stratos has described its jet as "not a VLJ ... but a very light personal jet." In December 2010 AVweb's Paul Bertorelli added, "personal jet is the description du jour. You don't hear the term VLJ—very light jet--much anymore and some people in the industry tell me they think it's because that term was too tightly coupled to Eclipse, a failure that the remaining players want to, understandably, distance themselves from."

== Timeline ==
1998–2002

Eclipse Aviation Corporation was founded in 1998 by Microsoft employee #18 Vern Raburn. Due to Raburn's relationship with Microsoft, Bill Gates became a major stakeholder early in the Eclipse project. Raburn and his team initially based the company in Scottsdale, Arizona, formed a board of directors in 1999 and started design work on the first aircraft. Due to investments made by the State of New Mexico and incentives and concessions from the City of Albuquerque, the company decided to set up its production facilities in Albuquerque, and also moved its headquarters there in 2000.

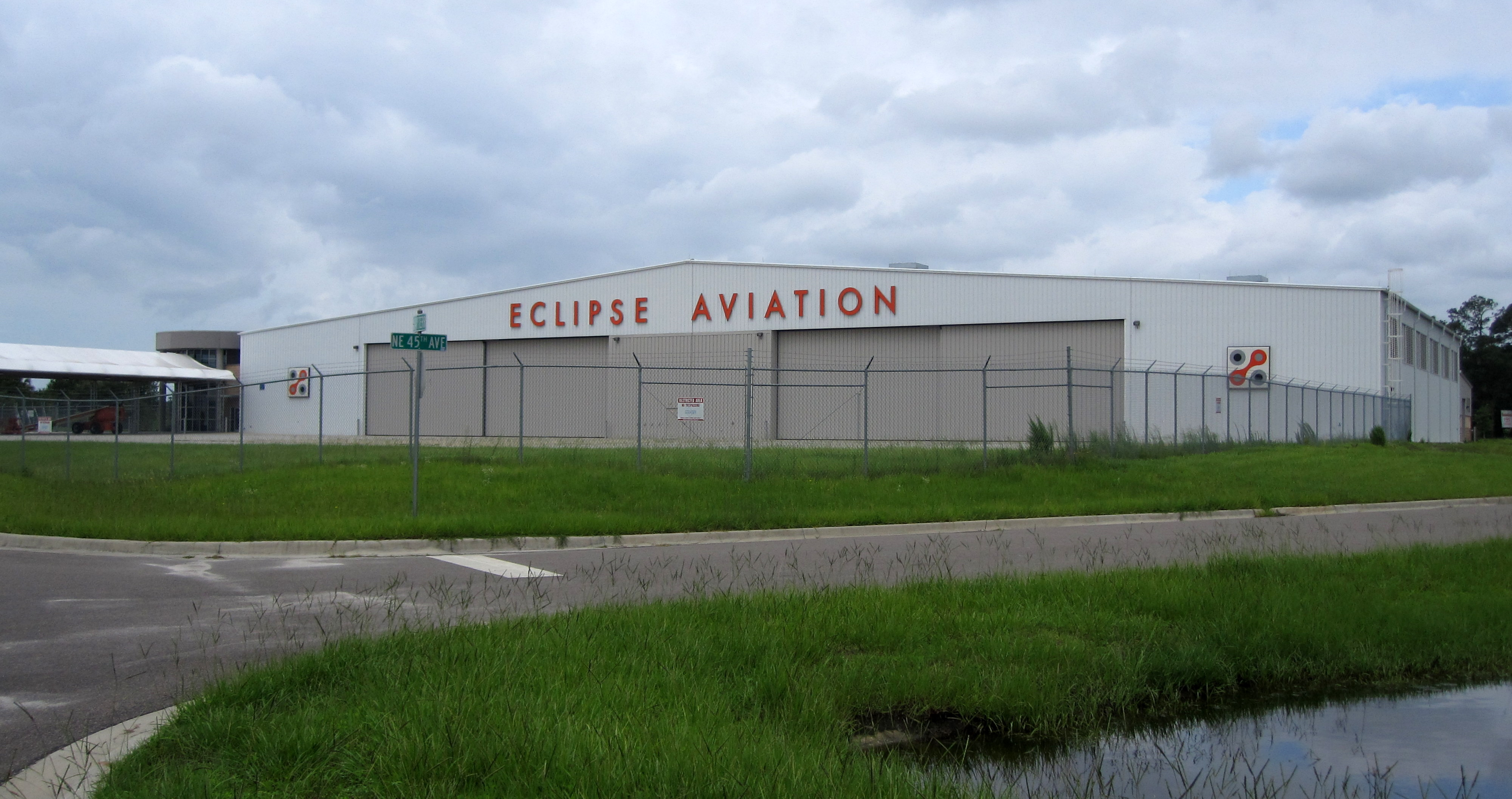
The Eclipse service center at Gainesville Regional Airport

In addition to its factory in Albuquerque, Eclipse established three service centers, at Albuquerque, at Gainesville Regional Airport in Florida, and at Albany International Airport in New York.

Preliminary design work on the Eclipse 500 was completed in 2000. The design was finalized in 2001 and construction of the first prototype commenced that year. The prototype first flew on 26 August 2002, powered by two Williams International EJ22 turbofans.

November 2002

The Eclipse 500 had been designed around the Williams International EJ22 turbofan engine and the aircraft's selling price and operating economics hinged on the use of that engine. The prototype Eclipse 500 only flew once with the EJ22s installed. Eclipse CEO Vern Raburn said that the engines never delivered the rated thrust and that the problems were not just developmental in nature. Williams International responded by stating that the engines met all the contractual obligations and that Eclipse simply demanded more thrust than the engine was capable of providing.

December 2004

As a replacement powerplant Eclipse selected the Pratt & Whitney Canada PW610F-A turbofan. This change required significant airframe redesign and introduced integration challenges. The prototype equipped with the PW610F engines first flew on 31 December 2004. The engine change caused a thirty-month delay in the Eclipse program and the forecast first customer deliveries.

February 2006

In February 2006 the National Aeronautic Association named Eclipse Aviation as the winner of the prestigious Collier Trophy for 2005. Specifically the award was for:

... applying innovations created in the technology industry to drive down cost, increase performance, improve safety, and spur a new type of air travel -- the air taxi. ... the selection committee's criteria included recognition of the rich heritage of the Collier Trophy, and 'the spirit of entrepreneurship, technical innovation, and the impact on American aviation,' exemplified by the Eclipse 500.

The award was controversial, as the NAA states that the prize is awarded "for the greatest achievement in aeronautics or astronautics in America, with respect to improving the performance, efficiency, and safety of air or space vehicles, the value of which has been thoroughly demonstrated by actual use during the preceding year." At the time of the award, prototype EA500s were flying but certification by the FAA was still 9 months away. The aircraft was not fully certified until 30 September 2006 and the first customer aircraft was not delivered until 2007. Critics indicated that the EA500 did not meet the stated criteria, although Eclipse Aircraft defended the award as justified. Richard Aboulafia termed it "a highly suspect award decision that managed to demean all the other worthy recipients and the Collier itself."

September 2006

The Eclipse 500 was FAA certified on 30 September 2006 under the official designation Eclipse Aviation EA500.

January 2007

The first customer EA500 was delivered in early January 2007.

July 2007

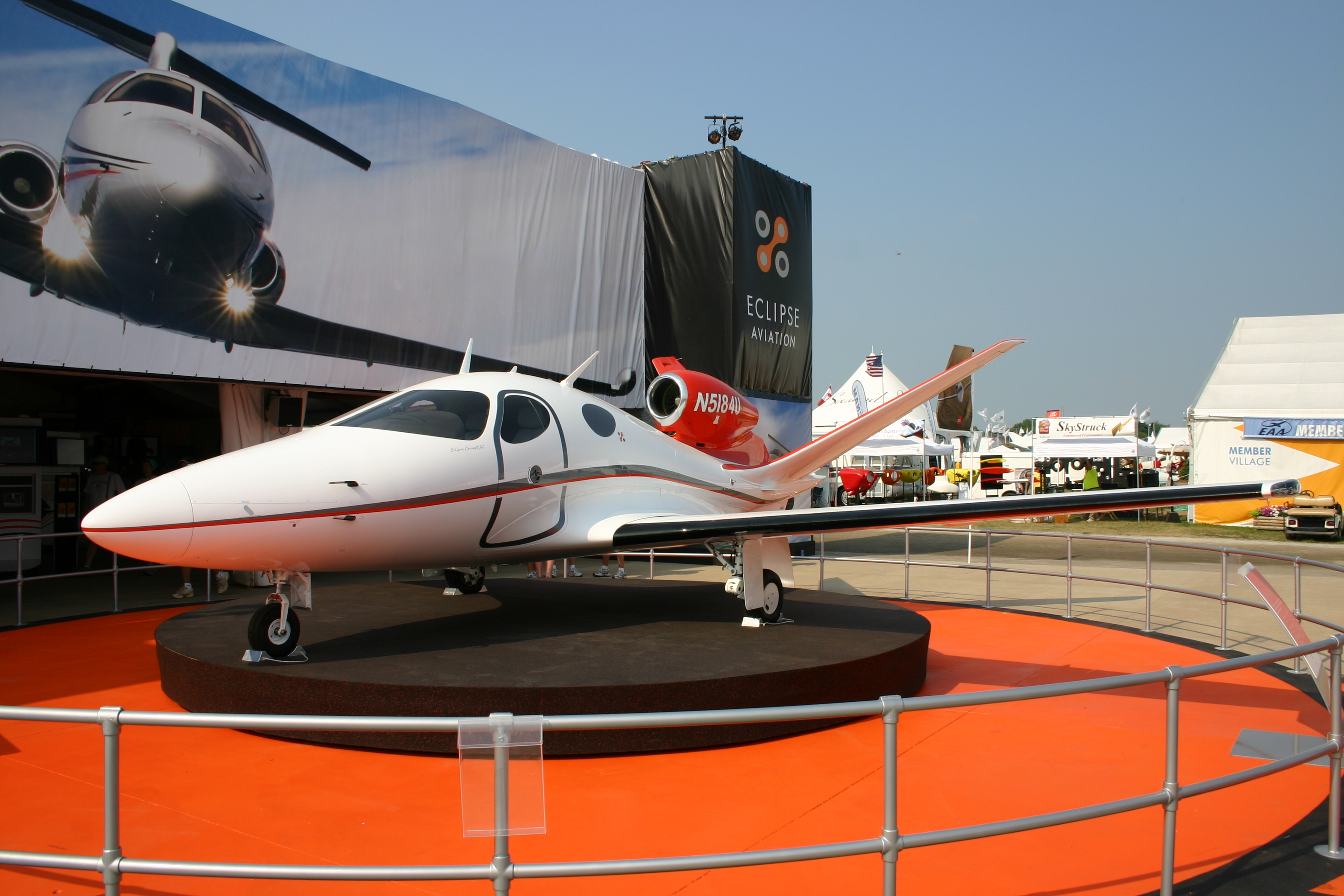
Eclipse Concept Jet (Eclipse 400)

On 23 July 2007 at AirVenture in Oshkosh, Wisconsin Eclipse unveiled the already flying prototype of a second company design initially called the Eclipse Concept Jet. The four-seat aircraft was powered by a single Pratt & Whitney Canada PW610F turbofan and was built in secrecy at NASA's Wallops Flight Facility in Virginia by Swift Engineering and Basis.

The ECJ had first flown on 2 July 2007. At the time of its announcement the aircraft was expected to have a cruise speed of 345 kn (639 km/h) at 41,000 ft (12,497 m) with an IFR range of 1,250 nmi (2,315 km). The aircraft was intended to have a 4,800 lb (2,177 kg) gross weight, 2,480 lb (1,125 kg) empty weight, 2,000 lb (907 kg) useful load and a fuel capacity of 1,261 lb (572 kg).

At the time of its announcement the company said that it did not intend to produce the aircraft. Eclipse CEO Vern Raburn said "The Eclipse Jet will allow us to obtain real, quantifiable data that looks at this developing category. While today we have no production plans for the ECJ, we are constantly evaluating markets for future Eclipse products ... we are anxious to reveal the potential of this emerging category, and our opportunity to add real value to it."

October 2007

In October 2007 the company furloughed some 100-150 contract workers and employees, about 10% of its workforce.

November 2007

In November 2007 Eclipse subcontractor Hampson Aerospace, which built the tail assembly, including the fin, horizontal stabilizers, rudder and elevators for the Eclipse 500, filed suit against Eclipse alleging that Eclipse had not paid for parts which had been delivered to Eclipse.

At the time Eclipse CEO Vern Raburn said of the issue:

You may have heard that a supplier of ours, Hampson Aerospace, has filed a lawsuit against Eclipse Aviation. Hampson manufactures the Eclipse 500's tail section, including the vertical and horizontal, rudder and elevators. I want to assure you that aircraft production has not stopped, and Hampson remains a supplier. Our number one priority continues to be delivering outstanding aircraft to you. While I cannot go into too much detail on pending litigation, I will say that as in most production situations, occasionally we get into a dispute with a vendor. However, we almost always work the differences out and very few disagreements end up in the public domain as legal action. Prior to Hampson's filing, we sent them a notice outlining a number of recurring quality issues. These concerns have led to a discrepancy on what parts should be paid for, and which should not. Contrary to wishful speculation by our competitors and critics, this issue has absolutely nothing to do with the financial health of Eclipse Aviation. In short, it is about our refusal to accept and pay for sub-standard material. I am very hopeful that we will be able to work through our differences, and that our partnership with Hampson will continue.

The suit was resolved in February 2008 in a confidential agreement.

December 2007

During 2007 Eclipse produced 104 aircraft and proclaimed a record for building its "first 100 airplanes faster than any GA jet aircraft manufacturer in history." CEO Vern Raburn described the accomplishment as "audacious" and added "We're transforming how jets are built, and how people travel. It's an audacious goal, and one that stretches us every day to go beyond what seems possible. Day-to-day setbacks are inevitable, but the reality is that we have created a new aircraft category and are bringing a new breed of jet to market at a rate never before seen in general aviation."

February 2008

In February 2008 the company purchased a 2005 model Cirrus SR20 light single-engined piston aircraft to be used as a company employee flying club aircraft.

April 2008

In April 2008 Eclipse obtained a court order in California ordering Google to provide the IP addresses of 29 anonymous contributors to the Eclipse Aviation Critic NG blog, which is hosted on Google's Blogger service. The blog, run by Shane Price of Dublin, Ireland is a forum for those who are critical of the company and its treatment of employees, customers and suppliers. Eclipse CEO Vern Raburn said that the pursuit of blog contributors was not to suppress criticism, stating: "We're not trying to suppress dissension or criticism. We're just trying to find out where it's coming from." Raburn stated that since Eclipse employees and suppliers are bound by non-disclosure agreements he wanted to ensure that these are not being broken.

Price indicated that some of the identities named in the court subpoena had not posted on the blog and that these names may have come from a previous blog that was critical of Eclipse and was no longer active. The subpoena was opposed by several people in court on the basis that, since they have no connection to the company, the disclosure of their identities would violate their First Amendment rights.

One contributor to the blog, Rich Lucibella, told CharterX Industry Headline News that he found Eclipse's actions "outrageous." Lucibella said: "What Eclipse is attempting to do is just wrong, they want to take advantage of people's rights; I can't stand by and let them do that ... Eclipse doesn't have the right to access other people's private information. For example, if three bloggers are or were employed by Eclipse but others aren't, then the rest of the people's privacy rights are violated under the First Amendment. Eclipse hasn't appeared to invoke the rule of reason."

Lucibella retained attorney Norman Malinski and filed a motion in the Superior Court of California to prevent Google from releasing contributors' private information.

May 2008

Despite earlier claims that the company would not produce the aircraft, on 30 May 2008 Eclipse Aviation began taking orders for a production version of the Eclipse Concept Jet, now designated the Eclipse 400. The 400 was at that time priced at $1.35 million and deliveries were expected to begin by the fourth quarter of 2011.

July 2008

Founding President and CEO Vern Raburn resigned as a condition of a financing package by European Technology and Investment Research Center (ETIRC) Aviation, the company that had invested more than US$100 million in Eclipse in 2008. Raburn announced his resignation in an unexpected public event at AirVenture on Monday 28 July 2008. In departing Raburn stated that he believed Eclipse fundamentally changed aviation but he did acknowledge that events did not occur as quickly or as smoothly as he had planned.

Raburn was replaced as CEO by Roel Pieper, the chairman of the board of directors and president of ETIRC. Raburn was initially offered an executive position at ETIRC; he turned it down, thus ending his relationship with Eclipse.

At the time of Raburn's departure, Pieper paid tribute to Raburn saying:

He has built up the company. Now you have to move to a different stage in the business where it's about operations, it's about quality, it's about efficiency. The board, the investors, the note holders, everybody has agreed that this is the moment to do that.

Pieper also said of the company in July 2008:

The entire layout of the factory was built to get to 2.0 [aircraft per day production] without problems. I think the whole goal of getting to 1.7, 1.8 is a reasonable goal. It doesn't say 2 and a half. I don't want to overstress it, but that will give us an opportunity to get to profitability in Q1, March of next year.

August 2008

On August 3, 2008, after Vern Raburn's removal from the company, the new management at Eclipse dropped the non-disclosure legal actions against Google and the bloggers, under terms set by defending attorney Malinski. "If Eclipse ever goes after these 29 bloggers again, Eclipse could face financial penalties in advance of proceedings," Malinski said. He also stated: "Freedom of speech rights includes being able to keep your identity anonymous, to be able to express freedom of speech, to have the freedom to disagree with someone else's opinion without being harassed."

In response to frequent rumors in the summer of the 2008 that the company would close its Albuquerque plant and relocate the operation, Eclipse issued the following statement on 14 August 2008:

Today, Eclipse Aviation confirmed that the executive management team is working diligently to develop a plan to achieve operational excellence. We are evaluating every aspect of the company and we will announce a plan to profitability by the end of the month. Eclipse also confirms it has no intention to move its production facilities outside of the United States in contrast to some current media speculation. Eclipse will not be releasing any further information or conducting interviews surrounding this media alert at this time.

On 19 August 2008 Albany International, an Eclipse supplier, announced that production of the Eclipse would soon be dropping significantly.

On Wednesday 20 August 2008 Hampson Aerospace closed its Grand Prairie production plant, leaving Eclipse without a supplier of tail sections. In late September Hampson revised its webpage to remove details of its relationship with Eclipse.

On 22 August 2008, Eclipse announced that it would be laying off 650 of its workforce of 1800 people (38% of its work force).

Company President and CEO, Roel Pieper, said: "Financial stability is critical for this company and unfortunately, a reduction in workforce was necessary to achieve it. I am confident this action will set the company on the path to profitability so that we can continue to lead the very light jet category."

Albuquerque Mayor Martin Chavez reacted to the layoff notice saying: "This is quite serious news from Eclipse that 600 jobs will be lost. The city of Albuquerque and the state of New Mexico intend to work together to try and place those impacted by those decisions. It is our hope that in the near future, Eclipse becomes a community leader once again in Albuquerque." Chavez expressed confidence in the new company management and that the company will be turned around by the end of 2008. Chavez stated: "In the end, if everything goes right, it will lead to even more jobs in Albuquerque. We'll see how it works out." The city previously provided a number of incentives to convince Eclipse to locate in Albuquerque, including $45 million in industrial revenue bonds issued in 2004 and $770,000 in property tax abatements. The city's Economic Development Department said that Eclipse, and not the city, was responsible for the industrial revenue bonds.

New Mexico had invested US$19 million in Eclipse as part of a package to get the company to locate in the state. Governor Bill Richardson indicated on 22 August 2008 that he didn't believe the situation was hopeless, stating: "I've been assured by the president of Eclipse that these jobs will eventually come back ... But I am concerned about the viability, in the future, of Eclipse ... I will try to help them seek additional funding and investors, but I like their long-term game plan and their short-term game plan."

In late August the company held a meeting for 90 of its suppliers. The meeting was intended to gather support for the company following the removal of Raburn and the layoff of the 650 employees. However by this time the majority of suppliers had already put the company on credit watch for non-payment of invoices and required cash-in-advance payments for all parts to be delivered. Ironically at his departure Raburn had laid the blame for much of the company's failures on its suppliers.

On 29 August 2008 Pratt & Whitney Canada repossessed 24 engines sold to Eclipse, valued at $5,165,744.

In August 2008, in a communication to position holders, the company indicated that development of the Eclipse 400 was on hold.

In August 2008 Eclipse was sued for failing to provide a refund on a cancelled order by its due date of 1 August 2008. Ice Blue Air, of London, had ordered an Eclipse 500 in 2006 and indicated that, due to the price increases, they were entitled to a refund as stipulated in the purchase agreement. The purchase agreement permitted cancellation and a full refund if the aircraft's price was raised. Eclipse disagreed and responded that no refunds would be possible until further financing was in place, anticipated at that time for the end of 2008. Eclipse was the subject of several similar delivery-related lawsuits and as many as 300 customer orders were cancelled and awaiting refunds.

September 2008

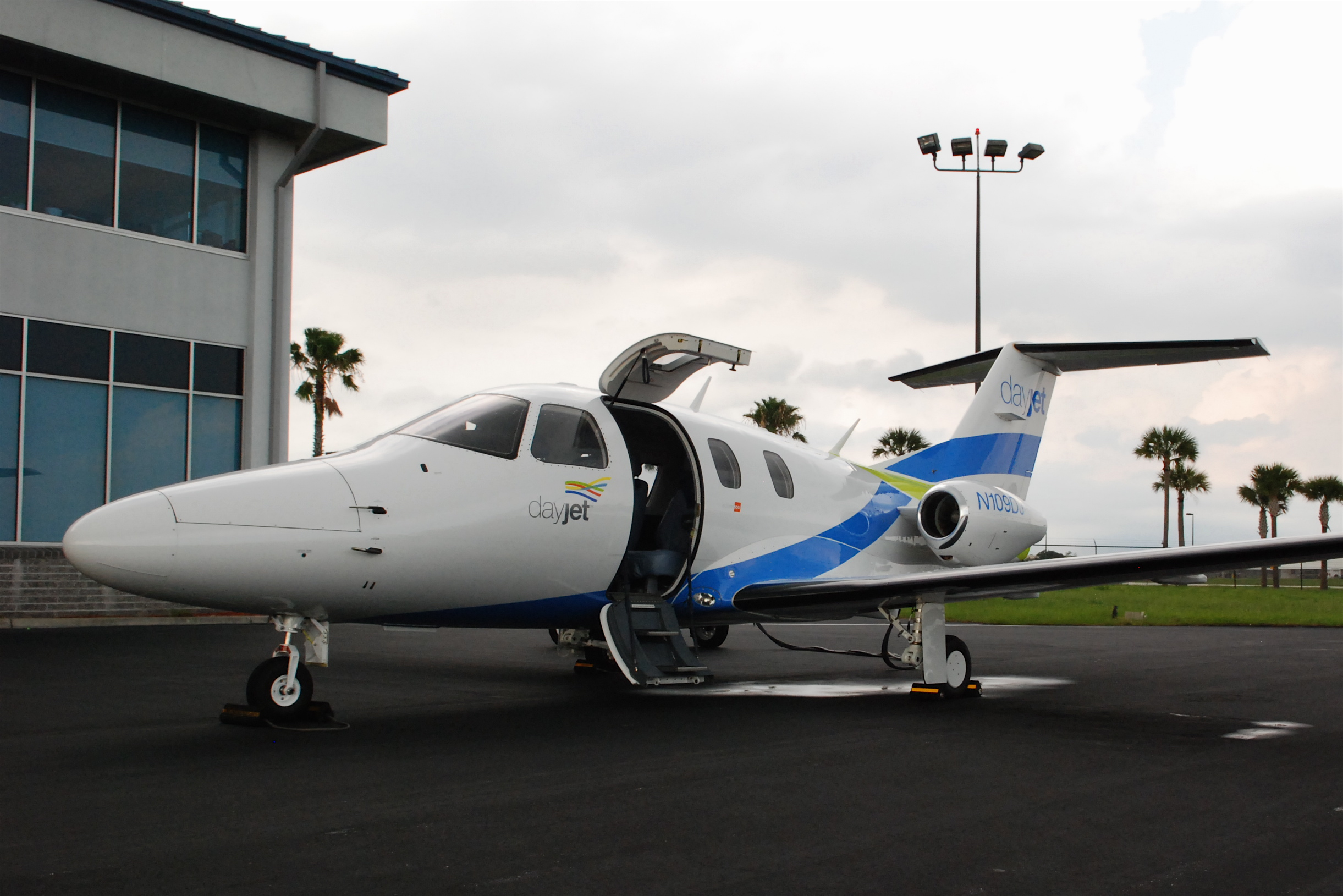
DayJet Eclipse 500

On 25 September 2008 Robert Bigler of Cupertino, California filed suit against Eclipse for not returning his deposit of US$182,000. Eclipse filed a motion in response indicating that the "Plaintiff did not comply with the contract requirements for obtaining a refund, and therefore has not yet given the required 'effective notice' under the contract at issue. Plaintiff's claims therefore are premature."

In September and again in October 2008, Eclipse indicated that unless it received "funding in October or November," it would not have the ability to refund customer deposits.

On 19 September 2008, during the 2008 financial crisis, Eclipse's largest customer, DayJet, representing 1430 orders for the Eclipse 500, ceased flying operations for financial reasons and indicated that a return to flying was "unlikely". The company's operations also suffered as a result of Eclipse Aviation's alleged failure to install missing equipment or functionality or repair agreed technical discrepancies in accordance with the terms of DayJet's aircraft purchase contract.

In October 2008, Airport Journals reported more detail on the DayJet order for 1400 aircraft:

On May 2, 2007, for the first time, Traver-Gruen-Kennedy, vice president of strategic operations at DayJet, confirmed to this journalist that in 2002, under the name of Jetson Systems, not DayJet, 1,400 EA-500 orders were placed. During that time, Gruen-Kennedy said that although the colossal order was placed, the company would first operate 300 VLJs within a two-year period. But because the 1,400 orders existed, at least on paper, they were used during a 2005 New Mexico State Investment Council meeting, which prompted the state's private equity program to purchase more than $3 million of Eclipse Series F preferred stock. Since that funding, the state invested much more into Eclipse. For years, aviation analysts have said they doubted there was any substance behind the 1,400 orders. To this day, Eclipse has refused to make its order book available, for verification of orders and cancellations. With the Eclipse 500's price now reaching $2.5 million, and with the 1,400 orders gone, aerospace analysts are skeptical about the company's likelihood of survival. Eclipse's marketing plan was based on mass production with a VLJ in the $1 million range.

Eclipse Aviation announced in October 2008 that it was acting as "the exclusive broker" and was advertising the entire DayJet fleet of 28 aircraft for sale.

Canadian light aircraft fractional aircraft company OurPlane bid on the entire DayJet fleet of aircraft, offering more than "$500,000 each but less than $1.5 million" each. OurPlane operates a fleet of Cirrus SR22 aircraft and one current Eclipse 500. OurPlane planned to offer its customers one-quarter shares in the Eclipse 500s for less than US$449,000. The sale was never completed and OurPlane went into Chapter 7 liquidation in October 2010 after selling all its customer's "fractional ownership" aircraft.

Eclipse Aviation announced on 23 September 2008 that it planned to establish a factory in Ulyanovsk, Russia to assemble the Eclipse 500. The Russian State Bank Vnesheconombank agreed to finance 100% of the project, providing US$205 million and would be a part-owner of the operation. The Russian State Bank supervisory board is chaired by Russian Prime Minister Vladimir Putin. The Russian-based operation was intended to be jointly operated by the European Technology and Investment Research Center (ETIRC) Aviation, the Russian Federation, the Commonwealth of Independent States and the Republic of Turkey.

October 2008

On 8 October 2008, the Belgian company Royal Properties filed a lawsuit, alleging that Eclipse Aviation failed to return "the deposit it paid despite the occurrence of a Refund Event and Royal Properties' effective notice of demand for a refund."

In October 2008 when asked "if the Eclipse 400 project was a go or not, Eclipse said it has not begun the certification process. The company also said it has not spent any of the deposit money for the four-place, single-engine VLJ."

Eclipse halted production of the EA500 in October 2008 at serial number 267, although serial number 266 was completed much earlier in the year. The company indicated that it lacked the funds to continue production or to refund customer deposits for the EA500 and 400 that were owed and were the subject of outstanding lawsuits.

In October 2008 a number of industry analyses and media reports were released all predicting that Eclipse would soon enter bankruptcy, production of the Eclipse 500 would end and development of the Eclipse 400 would cease.

In an analysis of the company and its situation in October 2008 Richard Aboulafia, Vice President, Analysis, Teal Group in his consultant's report on Eclipse said: "With numerous lawsuits from suppliers and customers, Eclipse faces the prospect of involuntary or voluntary bankruptcy ... we doubt that Eclipse can survive as an ongoing business. There is a chance that additional cash injections would keep it alive for another year or two. But for now, our forecast calls for production to end in 2009."

On 28 October 2008 Forecast International released a report on Eclipse projecting "that production of the Eclipse 500 will soon end". They also stated: "Eclipse continues to produce aircraft at a low rate as it seeks to preserve cash. We have forecast production of 162 Eclipse 500s during 2008. We believe that the company will be able to push production out into early 2009 but will be forced to cease production within the first quarter of 2009 ... even this forecast may prove too optimistic ... To restructure its operations and reach profitability, Eclipse Aviation has said publicly that it needs $200–$300 million in new equity investment. With credit markets in the midst of a major crisis, Eclipse Aviation is seeking funding at a time when bankers and investors are reluctant to pour hundreds of millions of dollars into a company facing an uncertain future." Forecast International predicted that Eclipse would not be successful in attracting the new investment it needed to continue production past March 2009.

Responding to the Teal Group and Forecast International outlooks for Eclipse, Serge Le Guellec, president and CEO of Mecaer America, a Montreal-based subcontractor who built the landing gear for the Eclipse 500, on 4 November 2008 said: "We are following the situation very closely. We understand that for Eclipse there are difficulties securing financing. I think we must be prudent, but I also think it is a bit premature to predict its (Eclipse's) demise by the end of the first quarter of 2009."

Composite manufacturer and Eclipse subcontractor Albany International indicated in its fourth quarter report, issued on 4 November 2008, that it expected Eclipse's prospects to improve in 2009: "... in August [2008] we announced that at Eclipse Aviation, AEC's largest customer, was substantially cutting back production. For AEC, this meant a complete stoppage of production of parts for Eclipse. We also stated in August that we expected Eclipse to ramp back up in 2009. Indications from Eclipse are that they are on track for a 2009 recovery, which would mean that AEC Production of Eclipse components would return to at least Q2 2008 rates by Q3 of 2009."

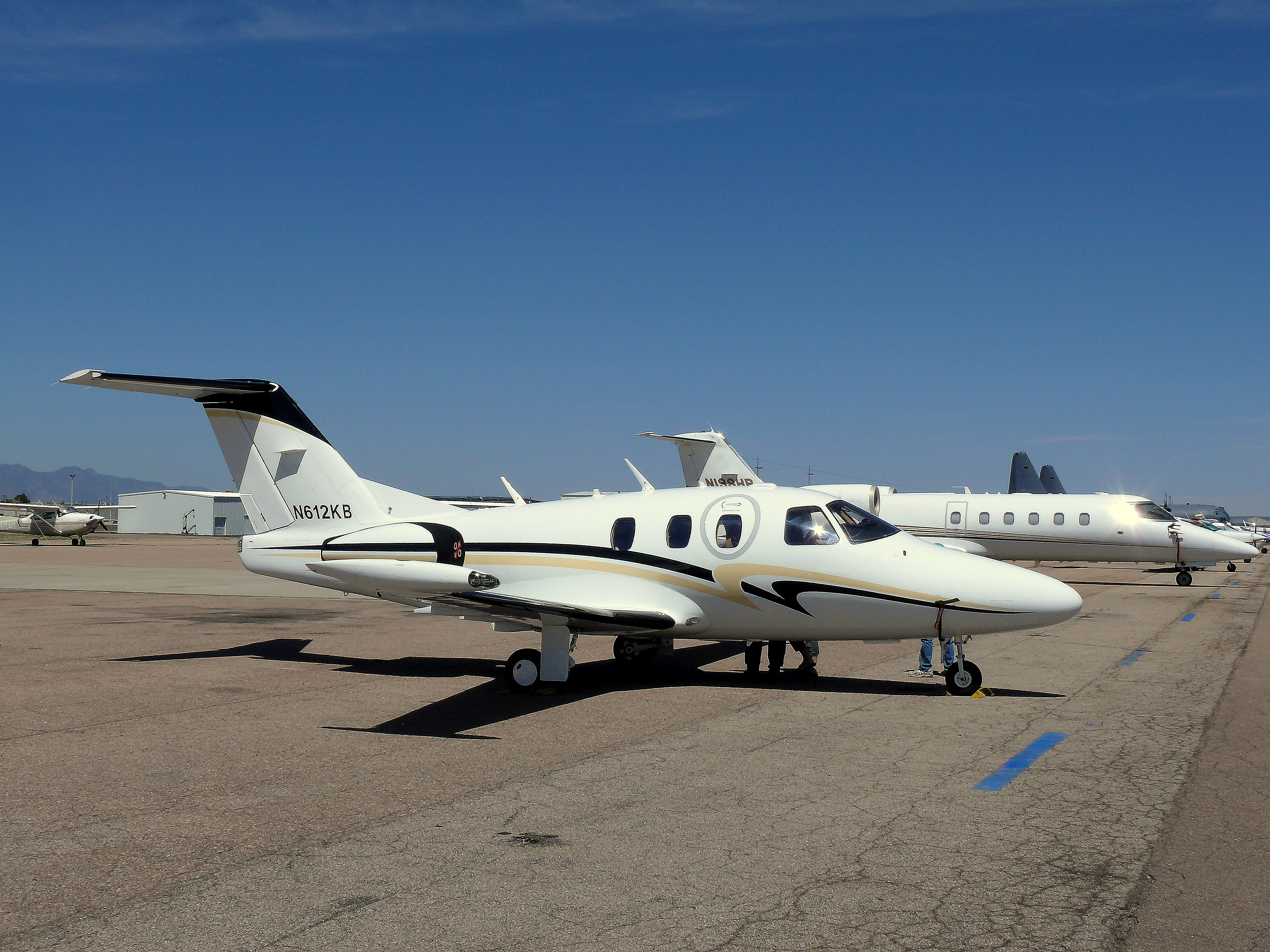
A customer-owned EA500 at Colorado Springs Airport

November 2008

In early November 2008 a group of Eclipse 500 deposit-holders proposed forcing Eclipse Aviation into involuntary bankruptcy. Their plan was to apply to a Delaware court, Eclipse's state of incorporation, indicating that the company had defrauded customers by their actions of accepting deposits for aircraft that were supposed to be delivered within six months of the deposit payment being made, but had not been delivered.

Eclipse CEO Roel Pieper responded to this story saying: "I think there will be no judge who will do that. I'm disappointed that these people think that way, but that is because of the previous culture and attitude around Eclipse, and I would have hoped that these people would give us the time to fix what needs to be fixed and then come back to us. I think most of them will understand that there are so many other financial obligations that doing something like this makes no sense, just causes more damage, and then they're not going to get any money anyway. I would be surprised if a bankruptcy judge would even go there with all the jobs at stake and all the other obligations at stake. I'm disappointed that these people hold a grudge against the company while they see the company changing."

On 11 November 2008 EPAC Aviation, an Australian Eclipse 500 distributor filed suit against the company for unreturned deposits.

In November 2008 it was announced that Eclipse had become a "strategic sponsor" of the Amsterdam-based EclipseJet MyGuide Amsterdam basketball team with Eclipse CEO Roel Pieper as the team's new president, indicating that the company had some monetary resources available for some projects.

Former CEO Vern Raburn spoke at the VLJ forum held in West Palm Beach, Florida on 12 November 2008, indicating that he no longer had any connection to the company. In his keynote address to the conference he provided further information on the events at Eclipse Aviation in 2008. Of the aviation industry he said, "It's fraught with people whose comment to anything new is, 'It can't be done. It hasn't been done, so it shouldn't be done.'" and termed the industry, "phenomenally sad". He said that the FAA is "100 percent political" and placed the blame for the Eclipse congressional hearings on unions. On his departure from Eclipse, Raburn stated that it was not voluntary: "I got fired. The reason I got fired was simple: I pissed off the investors." Raburn went on to criticize anonymous bloggers, alluding to Eclipse Aviation Critic NG and the legal action he tried to take against them. He termed the bloggers "idiots and cowards ... They do it through anonymity ... They're cockroaches trying to hide under rocks."

On 13 November 2008 the company employees were called to a 6 am meeting by Eclipse President of Manufacturing, Peg Billson and told that they would not be paid for the past two weeks' work. Billson informed the employees that the problem was in obtaining financing from Europe and that employees should go home and await further notice. Employees "expressed anger, frustration and uncertainty before speeding out of the facility's parking lot."

State of New Mexico Economic Development Secretary Fred Mondragon said that there were indications that the banks had frozen the assets of Eclipse Aviation, saying "I understand the banks put a squeeze on the company, freezing their cash assets. The news is not good."

The Eclipse service facility in Gainesville, Florida was closed and locked up on 14 November 2008 and calls made to that company location by the media were not returned.

On 14 November 2008 Albuquerque Mayor Martin Chavez stated that he had spoken with Peg Billson, Eclipse's President of Manufacturing, and she told him that Eclipse expects to remain solvent, despite the current payroll shortfall and that funding should become available soon. The mayor indicated that he could not support the city bailing out the company at that time.

On the same day, Eclipse stated that it would pay its workers on Tuesday 18 November 2008 and that all employees were to report to work on Monday 17 November 2008. Company employees confirmed on 18 November 2008 that they had been paid for the previous two weeks' work, but expressed concerns about the next payday and whether the situation would be repeated.

Also on 14 November 2008 there were a total of seven parties who had filed deposit-related lawsuits against Eclipse. By 18 November 2008 the number of lawsuits for unpaid deposit refunds had grown to ten, totaling US$7 million.

On 20 November 2008 Eclipse announced a reduction in company hours for maintenance scheduling, technical services and customer care to Monday to Friday 0700-1900 MST. Outside those hours customers were asked to leave a message to be returned during business hours. The company did indicate that it would provide higher priority service for owners of aircraft that were grounded.

Aviation Week & Space Technology noted that "regardless of technical support, several critical spare parts are no longer in inventory because many vendors have stopped shipping spares to Eclipse until they receive payment for past due bills. And they won't ship more spares to Eclipse except on a COD basis. Notably, only a few vendors will sell parts directly to customers because of previous exclusive supply contracts with Eclipse."

European Aviation Safety Agency certification of the EA500 for private use was achieved on 21 November 2008. In conjunction with the announcement of EASA certification, Eclipse spokesperson Alana McCarraher indicated that the past two weeks had been challenging, but said of employee morale: "We're just all celebrating, today." Of the EASA certification she added: "We expect more orders to come from this."

On 25 November 2008 Eclipse Aviation filed for Chapter 11 bankruptcy protection. At the time of its bankruptcy filing there were 21 outstanding lawsuits for breach of contract regarding unrefunded deposits for Eclipse 500s. The company stated that it was "seeking court approval for debtor-in-possession (DIP) financing and procedures for the sale of substantially all of its assets under Section 363 of the U.S. Bankruptcy Code." The company also stated that it had found a buyer for the company's assets, an affiliate of ETIRC Aviation owned by Eclipse CEO Roel Pieper, the company that had made large investments in Eclipse. The buyout was subject to the receipt of other offers.

Documents filed by Eclipse pursuant to the bankruptcy indicated that it owed about US$577 million to its investors and US$135 million to its suppliers. The bankruptcy documents indicated that a total of US$702.6 million was owed and that the largest unsecured creditors were:

- King Road Investments US$92.3 million
- HBK Master Fund US$84.9 million
- Fuji Heavy Industries US$31.8 million - wings
- Hampson Aerospace US$31.3 million - empennage
- Pratt & Whitney Canada US$30.1 million - engines
- UT Finance US$13.5 million
- Albany Engineered Composites US$6.9 million
- DayJet US$6.2 million
- TW Metals US$5.9 million
- Chelton Flight Systems US$4.9 million
- Innovative Solutions & Support US$4.3 million - instrument panel
- Mecaer US$4.3 million - landing-gear.

The court documents filed by Eclipse stated that the bankruptcy occurred because the company "continued to lose larger than expected sums of money on each aircraft manufactured and has not reached cash flow positive in its operations." Total company liabilities were estimated at over US$1 billion.

In announcing the bankruptcy action, CEO Roel Pieper said: "In the face of unprecedented economic challenges, it is clear that the sale of the Eclipse business through the Chapter 11 process is the right course of action to maximize the value of the business, secure its future and protect the best interests of Eclipse's stakeholders, including customers, suppliers, employees and creditors. The successful sale will position the business for aggressive global expansion, allowing the company to fulfill its promise and solidify its position as the world's leading manufacturer of VLJs."

Peg Billson, president and manager of the company, resigned "to pursue other career opportunities."

The bankruptcy plan whereby the company would be sold to its largest shareholder, ETIRC, was criticized as an attempt by the current owners to liquidate the company and buy it back, while eliminating debts to suppliers and customers. Russ Niles of AvWeb said: "That sounds suspiciously like a Chapter 7 liquidation, except that in this case the winning bidder is preordained."

At the time of bankruptcy filing on 25 November 2008 Eclipse had delivered 259 EA500s. Aircraft serial number 260 had been paid for on the morning of and in advance of the filing. The company had signed the bill of sale for the aircraft, but refused to release the aircraft to its owner. The aircraft had actually been ready to be delivered to the owners on 21 November 2008, but remained at the factory to have some discrepancies rectified. The keys had been given to the owners prior to the bankruptcy filing, but company security refused to let the aircraft taxi for departure. The dispute resulted in a court filed motion as part of the bankruptcy proceedings. In addition to damages and a declaratory judgment of ownership of the aircraft or the return of the money paid, the plaintiffs in the case alleged unjust enrichment, conversion and tortious interference. The bankruptcy judge noted the fate of this particular aircraft and in the final bankruptcy judgment of 23 January 2009 ordered it released to its owner within five business days of the closing of the sale of the company assets. Due to the incomplete Chapter 11 procedure and move to Chapter 7, the order was delayed. The aircraft was finally released and was registered to its owner on 4 June 2009.

December 2008

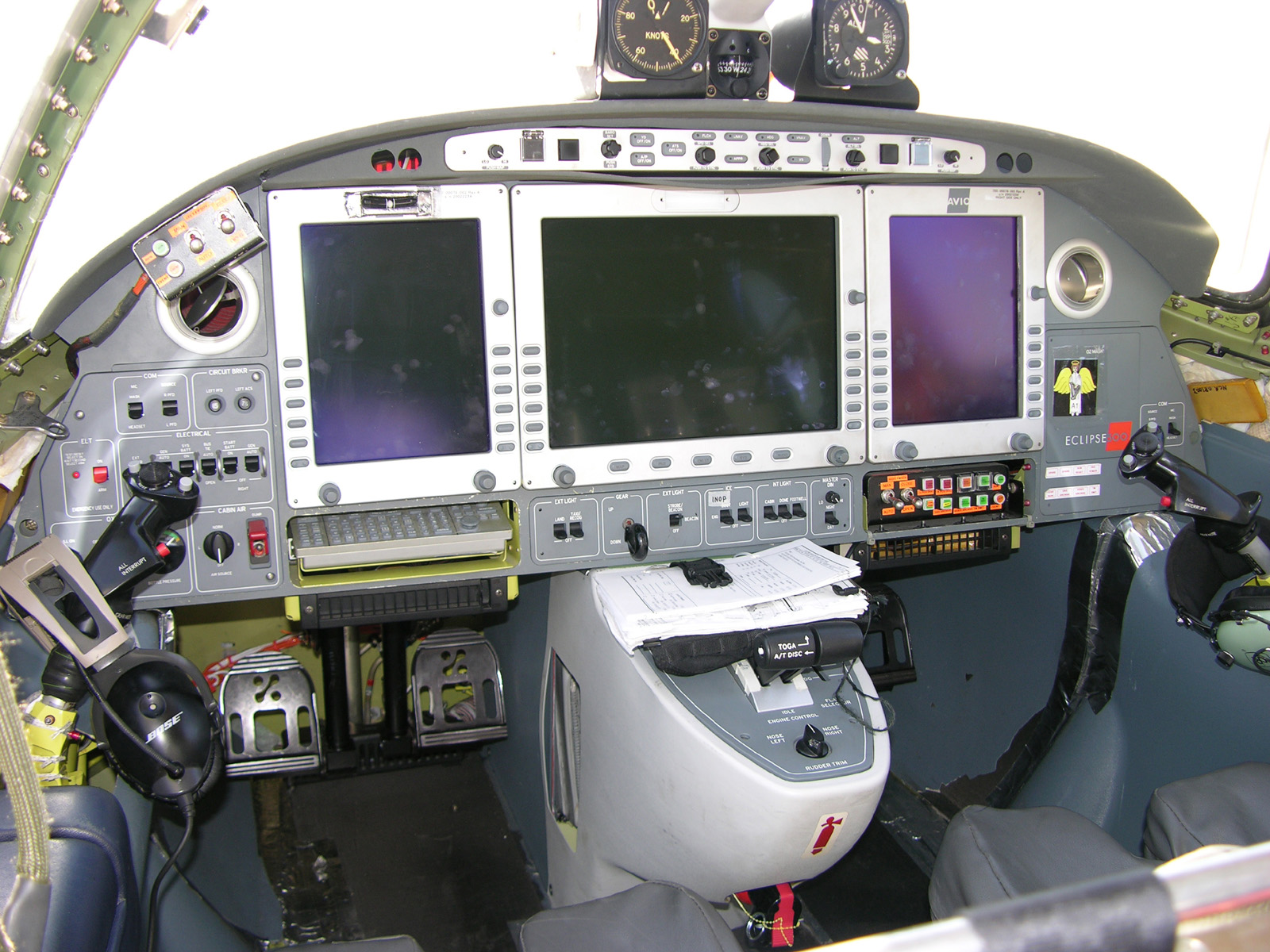
Eclipse 500 instrument panel

In December 2008 Eclipse 400 position holders requesting refunds reported that their deposits had not been refunded and that telephone calls to the company were not being returned. According to the purchase contracts the deposits were fully refundable until November 2009. Court documents filed by Eclipse 400 position holders as part of the bankruptcy hearings alleged that the company misappropriated the US$3.2M collected from depositors, did not escrow it as contracted to do so and refused to refund it when required to. The Eclipse bankruptcy judgment ordered the amount held in escrow, pending the outcome of an adversarial court action of the deposits.

On 17 December 2008 the existence of the Ad Hoc Customers Committee was announced. The group represented the rights of Eclipse 400 and 500 owners and position holders in the bankruptcy proceedings. The committee issued a statement saying: "Eclipse customers hold contracts under which Eclipse is obligated to provide warranty coverage, upgrades, uninstalled equipment, maintenance coverage, subscription services, and future aircraft deliveries. In terms of dollar amount, customers are likely the largest constituency in Eclipse's Chapter 11 case."

The committee was chaired by Eclipse Owners Club president David Green, who stated: "The Ad Hoc Customers Committee is funded by the owners and position holders in recognition that a unified voice is the most effective way to ensure that customers are fairly treated and that the Eclipse order book is preserved as one of the most valuable assets of Eclipse. Prospective purchasers of company assets must recognize that satisfied customers, many of whom have supported Eclipse for over eight years, can be the most effective marketing group for Eclipse aircraft. Finding a mutually beneficial outcome with the purchaser is our purpose; but all options are under consideration as we fulfill our mandate of protecting the interests of the customer group."

January 2009

A Delaware bankruptcy court scheduled an auction of the assets of Eclipse Aviation for 14 January 2009. EclipseJey International, the Luxembourg-based subsidiary of ETIRC Aviation, owned by Eclipse's Chairman of the Board Roel Pieper, announced that it intended to buy Eclipse, however there were indications at the time that other companies would bid on the assets as well. Former President and CEO Vern Raburn specifically stated that he would not enter a bid.

The intended auction was cancelled by the court when there was only one qualified bid submitted, by ETIRC Aviation subsidiary EclipseJet Aviation International Inc. ETIRC's intention was to buy the assets of Eclipse Aviation for US$188M, including US$28M in cash and US$160M in new notes. The company offered 15% equity to senior secured creditors. A group of existing position holders representing the 30 customers who had paid deposits on aircraft that were in various states of assembly at the time of the filing argued against the sale of the assets claiming that they are the rightful owners of those aircraft and not ETIRC.

On 20 January 2009 Federal Bankruptcy Court Judge Mary Walrath verbally approved the sale of the assets of Eclipse Aviation to EclipseJet Aviation International under Section 363 of the United States Bankruptcy Code over the objections of dozens of filed motions.

The court's final judgment document, which Judge Mary Walrath signed on 23 January 2009, stated that the bankruptcy sale was carried out in good faith, that there was no collusion or fraud, that the bid process was fair and that EclipseJet International's offer was the "highest and best offer". The order transferred all assets to the new buyer and extinguished all debts and obligations of the previous company. The position holders of the incomplete airframes under construction agreed to pay an additional US$1.375M to have their aircraft completed with the exception of one position holder, A.R Airways, who intended to commence an adversarial court action over Eclipse 500 serial number 273. The 30 Eclipse 400 position holders commenced an adversarial court proceeding to recover their deposits that were allegedly to have been held in escrow. The judge ordered US$3.2M be deposited in escrow against the outcome of that case. Other Eclipse position holders and depositors for aircraft of serial number 294 and higher, not yet started, were deemed unsecured creditors.

February 2009

A month after the sale to EclipseJet International had been approved the sale had not been completed due to lack of funds and, as a result, Eclipse Aviation's bridge financing ran out. Consequently the company sent most workers home on 18 February 2009, indicating that their employment would continue with EclipseJet International after the sale was finalized. In response New Mexico Governor Bill Richardson instructed the state Department of Workforce Solutions to provide extra resources to help the furloughed employees.

On 24 February 2009 a group of companies to whom Eclipse owed money applied to the court to force the unfinished Chapter 11 proceedings into Chapter 7 instead and to shorten the normal notice requirements, citing the continued daily loss of asset value, the lay-off of most workers on 18 February 2009 and the inability of EclipseJet International to secure financing.

On 25 February 2009 Eclipse Aviation issued a statement, signed by executives Mark Borseth and Michael McConnell and notably not signed by CEO and Chairman Roel Pieper, supporting the move to Chapter 7 liquidation. Judge Mary Walrath gave approval for the conversion to Chapter 7 on 4 March 2009. In a message to the employees the company executives said:

All of the executive management team at Eclipse gives you our most sincere and heartfelt thanks for your tenacity and perseverance in trying to deliver this dream we know as the Eclipse 500. We gave it one heck of a try. We are sorry that it came to this today ... Despite the efforts of many people at EclipseJet Aviation and ETIRC to obtain necessary funding to close the purchase of the assets of Eclipse Aviation, the closing of the sale transaction has stalled and our company is out of time and money.

Once the company assets were available though liquidation a number of potential buyers voiced their interest in buying the assets and providing support for the existing aircraft fleet. These included New Eclipse Acquisition LLC, a new company set up for this purpose by Phil Friedman, CEO of Harlow Aerostructures of Wichita, Kansas. Friedman's plans included supporting and upgrading the existing fleet and new production of Eclipse 500s at a rate of 100 per year for a price of about US$2.4M per aircraft. Friedman's plan specified mandatory upgrades for the older aircraft in the fleet, or, alternatively if some owners were unable to afford that, to help them sell their aircraft to new owners who can. Fearful that a new owner for the type certificate and tooling would hold a monopoly on maintaining the existing fleet the Eclipse Owners Club also organized a bid.

March 2009

With the Chapter 7 asset sale looming, a number of Eclipse owners expressed concern that two of the bids for the company assets, including the one from New Eclipse Acquisition LLC, planned to reestablish low-rate manufacturing of the Eclipse 500 primarily through forecast profits on mandatory upgrades to the existing fleet. The Eclipse Owners Group labeled these plans "predatory". "The idea in both of these plans is to exploit the captive market that the Eclipse customers represent," stated Randall Sanada, of Jet Alliance

By the middle of the month a number of plans and companies had been formed to purchase the assets. In addition to New Eclipse Acquisition LLC and Eclipse Owners Club bids, Eclipse Jet LLC which included former Eclipse CEO Roel Pieper as a director, Eclipse Services and Support LLC, a newly formed subsidiary of Linear Air. The China Commercial Aircraft Company indicated that it may submit a bid.

Despite being a competitor to the Eclipse 500 Owners Club, the bid by Eclipse Jet LLC claimed to have the endorsement of the club. Industry observers questioned the role of Roel Pieper in that company's bid as he was the subject of several legal actions in the failed Chapter 11 take-over and also for not meeting the federal 60-day notice regulations for laying off employees.

Despite entering Chapter 7 bankruptcy on 24 February 2009, by the end of March 2009 no date had been set for the auction of the company assets.

April 2009

With the Chapter 7 sale date still not set the various parties interested in acquiring the company assets continued to position themselves for the auction. The Eclipse Owners Group, representing members of the aircraft type club, announced that they had signed a Letter of Intent with Hawker Beechcraft to provide services in the event that the EOG wins the assets. The deal with Hawker Beechcraft would see that company provide maintenance for the existing fleet of 260 aircraft at their facilities around the country. Working with the EOG, Randall Sanada, chairman of Jet-Alliance, also stated that his company was planning to acquire the 28 ex-DayJet aircraft that remained unsold, with the aim of making them available to Eclipse position holders at a discounted price. Sanada indicated that these aircraft require many upgrades and that these may cost US$500,000 per aircraft.

On 7 April ETIRC declared bankruptcy. The Dutch newspaper de Volkskrant reported that Roel Pieper had personally invested US$146 million in Eclipse through ETIRC.

On 14 April it was confirmed that the China Commercial Aircraft Corporation intended to bid on the assets of Eclipse, subject to US export restrictions on the Eclipse technology and intellectual property.

June 2009

At the beginning of June 2009 the Chapter 7 bankruptcy trustee sought an extension of the date to complete the sale of the company assets after 1 July 2009.

On 24 June 2009 the European Aviation Safety Agency issued a statement suspending the Eclipse 500's type certificate, saying "The current Holder of the EASA Type Certificate EASA.IM.A.171 has been notified on 10 June 2009, of the Agency's decision to suspend the EASA Type Certificate EASA.IM.A.171 with effect from 12 June 2009." No reason for the suspension was announced.

July 2009

On 31 July 2009 Jeoffrey L. Burtch, the appointed Chapter 7 Trustee, filed a motion requesting the court's approval to sell the assets of Eclipse Aviation to Eclipse Aerospace a new company headed by Mike Press and Mason Holland, based in Charleston, South Carolina. The court-filed documents indicated that the assets would be sold for US$20M in cash and $20M in new notes, subject to other offers coming forth at an auction. The filing stated that if the directed sale to Eclipse Aerospace was not completed due to the auction proceeding, then Eclipse Aerospace would receive a US$1.6M "Break-Up Fee" instead. The trustee indicated to the court that he felt that this measure was justified to encourage movement towards an auction. He stated that 30 organizations had expressed interest in the assets, 12 had signed non-disclosure agreements and received complete information and six had completed tours of the Eclipse facilities, "however, prospective purchasers were either hesitant to make the first public bid, were unable to obtain financing, required unacceptable conditions to closing, or otherwise backed out." Without approval to pay for a bid and hopefully create an action "the Trustee will most likely be forced to abandon or liquidate the Eclipse Assets on a piece meal basis."

August 2009

The Chapter 7 sale hearing was heard in federal bankruptcy court on 20 August 2009, with Eclipse Aerospace as the sole and winning bidder. The previous bid by the Eclipse Owners Group was withdrawn and their support given to Eclipse Aerospace. Other parties that had previously expressed interest, including Daher-Socata, also did not submit bids. Eclipse Aerospace indicated that they intended to retain the company in Albuquerque, provide upgrades to the current Eclipse fleet and assess whether production can be restarted at some future point.

September 2009–December 2014

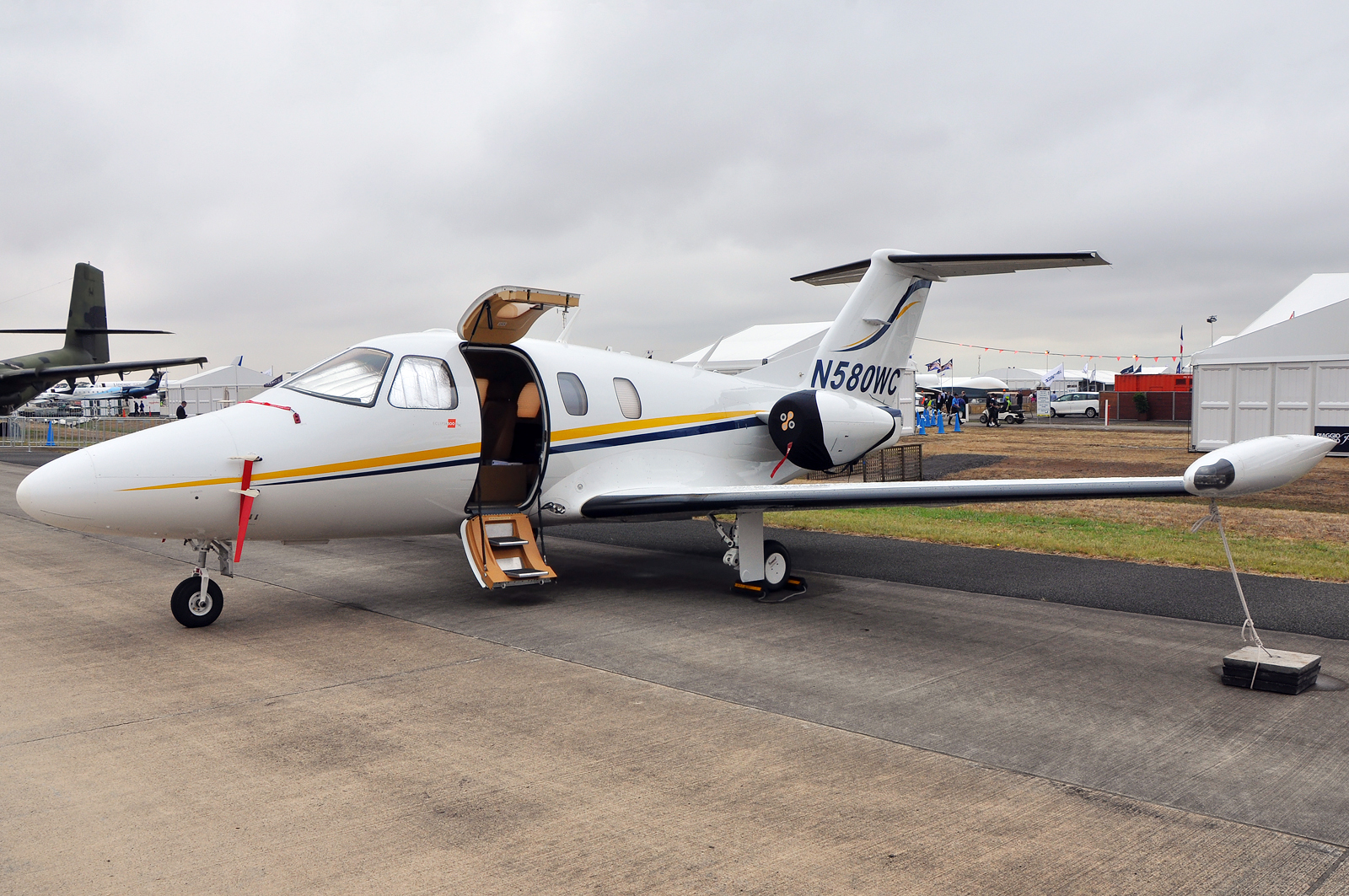
Eclipse 550

Eclipse Aerospace opened for business in the old Eclipse Aviation facilities on 1 September 2009, with 15 employees, and began deliveries of the Eclipse 550 in March 2014, completing a total of 12 deliveries by the end of the first year.

April 2015–present

In April 2015, Eclipse Aerospace merged with Kestrel Aircraft to form One Aviation, which subsequently went bankrupt in February 2021 after delivering a total of 33 Eclipse 550s from 2014–2017. One Aviation had announced plans in 2017 to develop a successor aircraft to the 550 called the Eclipse 700, though it was canceled upon the company's 2021 bankruptcy. AML Global Eclipse now maintains support for all Eclipse aircraft under the company name Eclipse Aerospace, Inc. In 2023, it restarted 550 production and delivered two examples that year.

== Conclusions ==
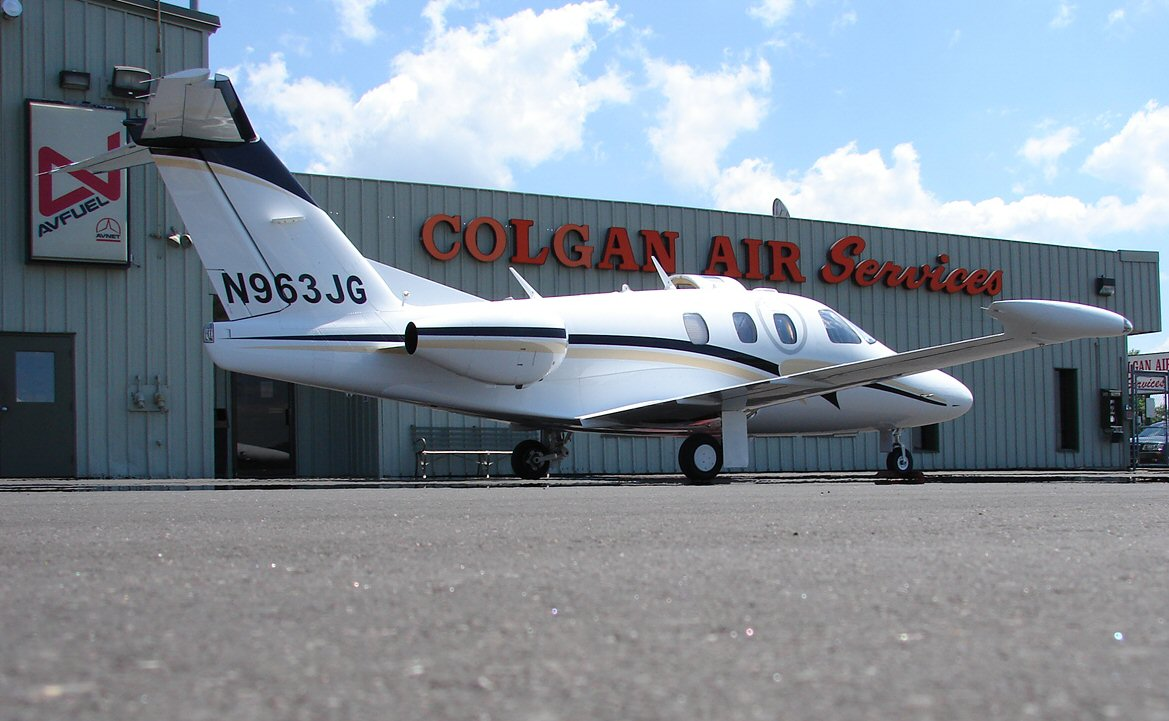
Eclipse 500

In analyzing the long-term results of the Eclipse Aviation development, Richard Aboulafia, Vice President, Analysis, Teal Group, stated:

In addition to the economic cost, this program and related air taxi schemes have had a toxic impact on a broad range of political and governmental entities. Somehow, the FAA got co-opted. If the [Inspector General's] report is correct, the FAA's actions were reprehensible, a threat to the principles of good governance that keep society safe. It would be akin to the FDA deciding to approve possibly tainted milk because it came from a well-connected dairy. During recent congressional hearings, New Mexico Gov. Bill Richardson implied that jobs were more important than honesty, safety and good government. For possibly the first time, a US government entity provided equity cash for a private business.

J. Mac McClellan, Editor in Chief of Flying Magazine concluded about the Eclipse case:

A disaster of this size has many causes, but the most fundamental was a fantasy about the economics of designing, building and supporting airplanes. The company also predicted impossibly low empty weights, which then led to unattainable performance and range predictions, and it expected to accomplish all of this in record setting time.

But Eclipse is, at its root, a financial failure first and foremost. It was costing the company more than twice as much to build an Eclipse 500 as it had sold the airplane for. And that was for an incomplete airplane lacking many basic functions and it would have cost many thousands more per airplane to eventually modify them to match the sales contract.

... Eclipse has provided yet another cautionary tale, and I do believe its effects will linger in the general aviation business for the rest of my career.

Russ Niles, Editor-in-Chief of AVweb offered this analysis:

While most of us are simply happy to see the end of a tortuous process, the timing is awful. With general aviation under the gun from all corners, this kind of collapse will only make it harder to rebuild an industry that has not only been pummeled by the market forces affecting all business but has been unfairly tarred as a symbol of greed and waste. Unfortunately, sometimes the shoe fits, and, fair or not, the industry as a whole will have to wear it for some time ... in aviation like anything else, we learn from our mistakes. Eclipse has certainly provided an education.

Writing in September 2009 after the bankruptcy sale of the company's assets, Paul Bertorelli, AVweb Editorial Director said:

The most spectacular [VLJ concept] failure has been Eclipse, which tanked for a multitude of reasons related to hubris, out-of-control costs, inappropriate technology and just ordinary mismanagement, in my estimation. But looming over the entire project was Eclipse's concept of building jets and selling them at or right around the $1 million mark. Among other things, Eclipse proved that this can't be done, or at least it can't be done the way Eclipse tried it.
