= Sloot =

Sloot may refer to:

- Sloot Digital Coding System, an alleged data sharing technique
- Courtney Vandersloot (born 1989), American basketball player

== See also ==
- Vandersloot
