= Eclipse Aviation =

Defunct American aerospace manufacturer

Eclipse Aviation Corporation
- Logo from 2000 to 2008
- Company type: Private
- Industry: Aerospace
- Founded: 1998; in Scottsdale, Arizona, United States
- Founder: Vern Raburn
- Defunct: 2009
- Fate: Chapter 7 bankruptcy
- Successor: Eclipse Aerospace
- Headquarters: Albuquerque, New Mexico, United States
- Key people: Roel Pieper (CEO from 2008); Vern Raburn (CEO from 1998–2008)
- Products: Very light jets
- Number of employees: 850 (February 2009)
- Website: Archives

The Eclipse Aviation Corporation was the Albuquerque, New Mexico, United States–based manufacturer of the Eclipse 500 very light jet (VLJ), and also at one time proposed developing the Eclipse 400 single-engined jet.

The company was founded in 1998 by early Microsoft employee and former Symantec CEO Vern Raburn. Due to Raburn's relationship with Microsoft, Bill Gates was a major stakeholder in the Eclipse project. The company was known for helping usher in a new category of VLJs when the Eclipse 500 was first delivered in late 2006.

In October 2008, production of the Eclipse 500 was halted due to lack of funding. The company entered an unsuccessful Chapter 11 bankruptcy in November 2008, which was converted into a Chapter 7 bankruptcy liquidation procedure in February 2009. In the final Chapter 7 procedure, completed on August 20, 2009, there was only one bidder, a new company formed to acquire the assets, Eclipse Aerospace.

Eclipse operated service centers at Albuquerque International Sunport, Gainesville Regional Airport in Florida, and Albany International Airport in New York.

== History ==
=== Startup and growth ===
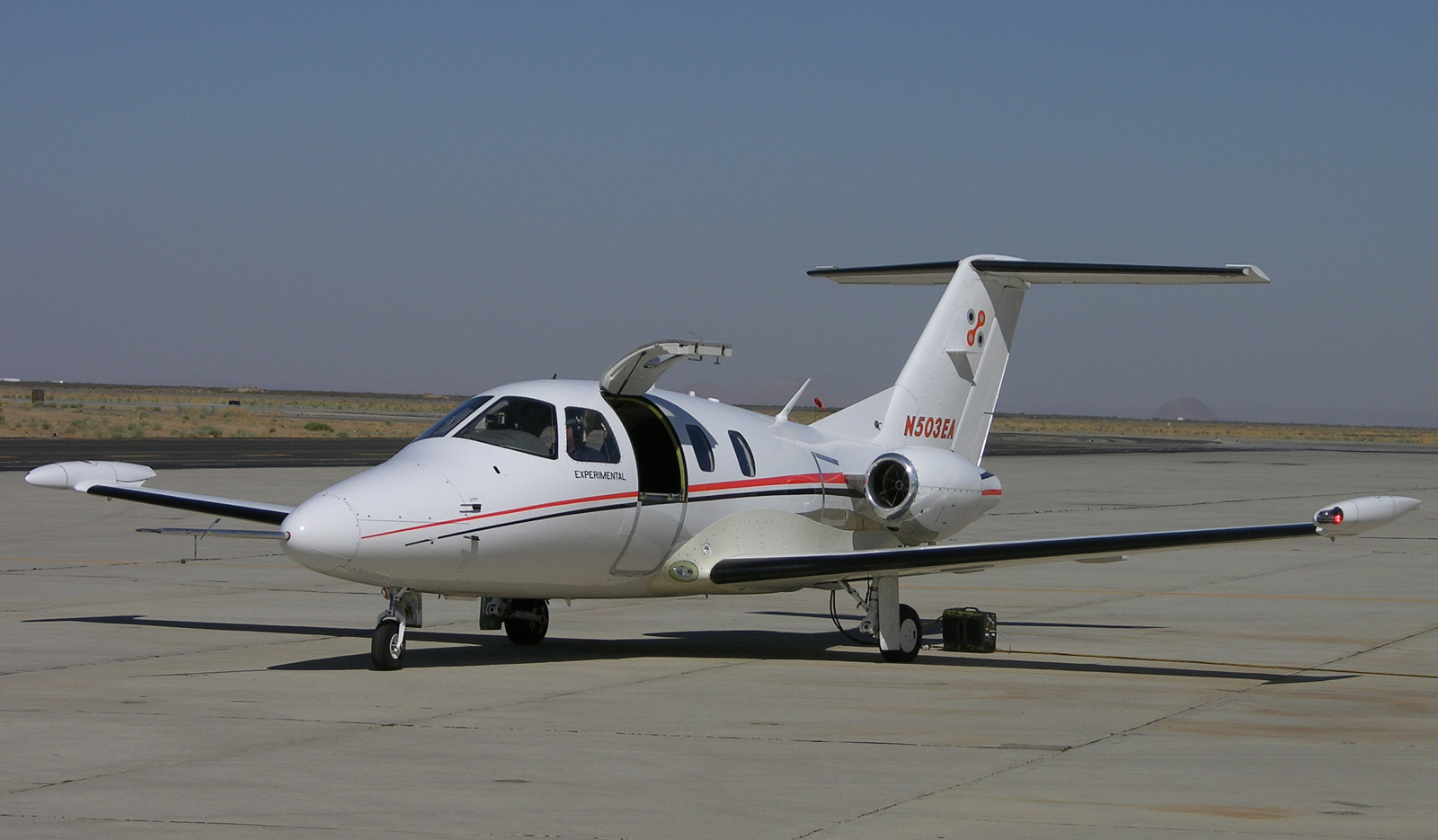
Eclipse 500 flight test aircraft at Mojave Airport in 2006

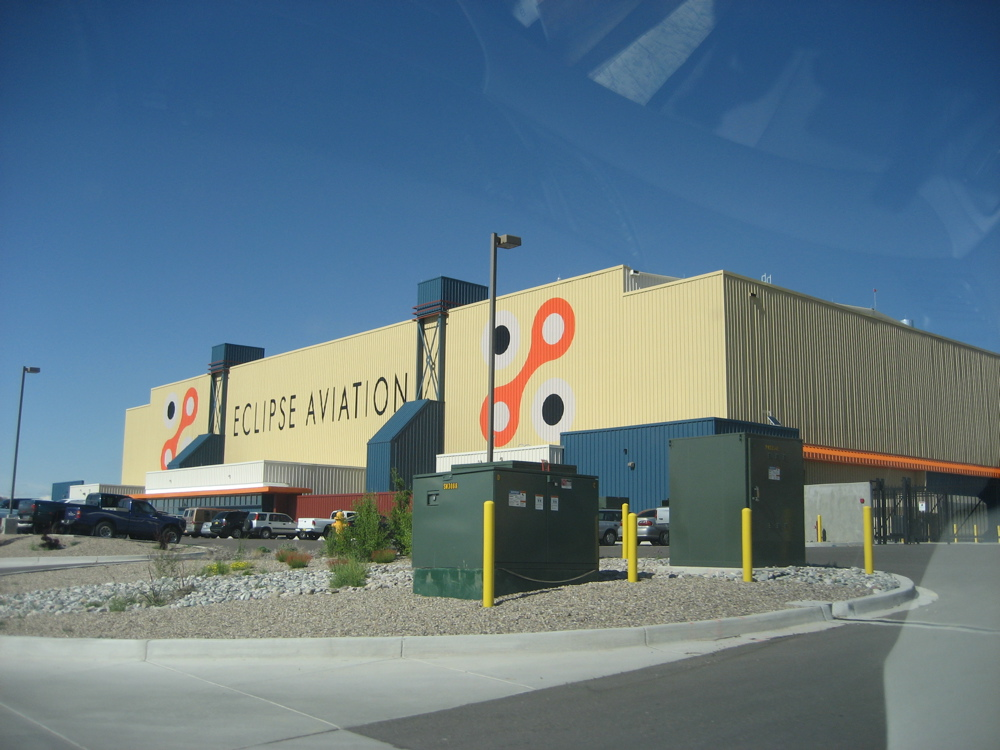
Eclipse factory in Albuquerque, New Mexico

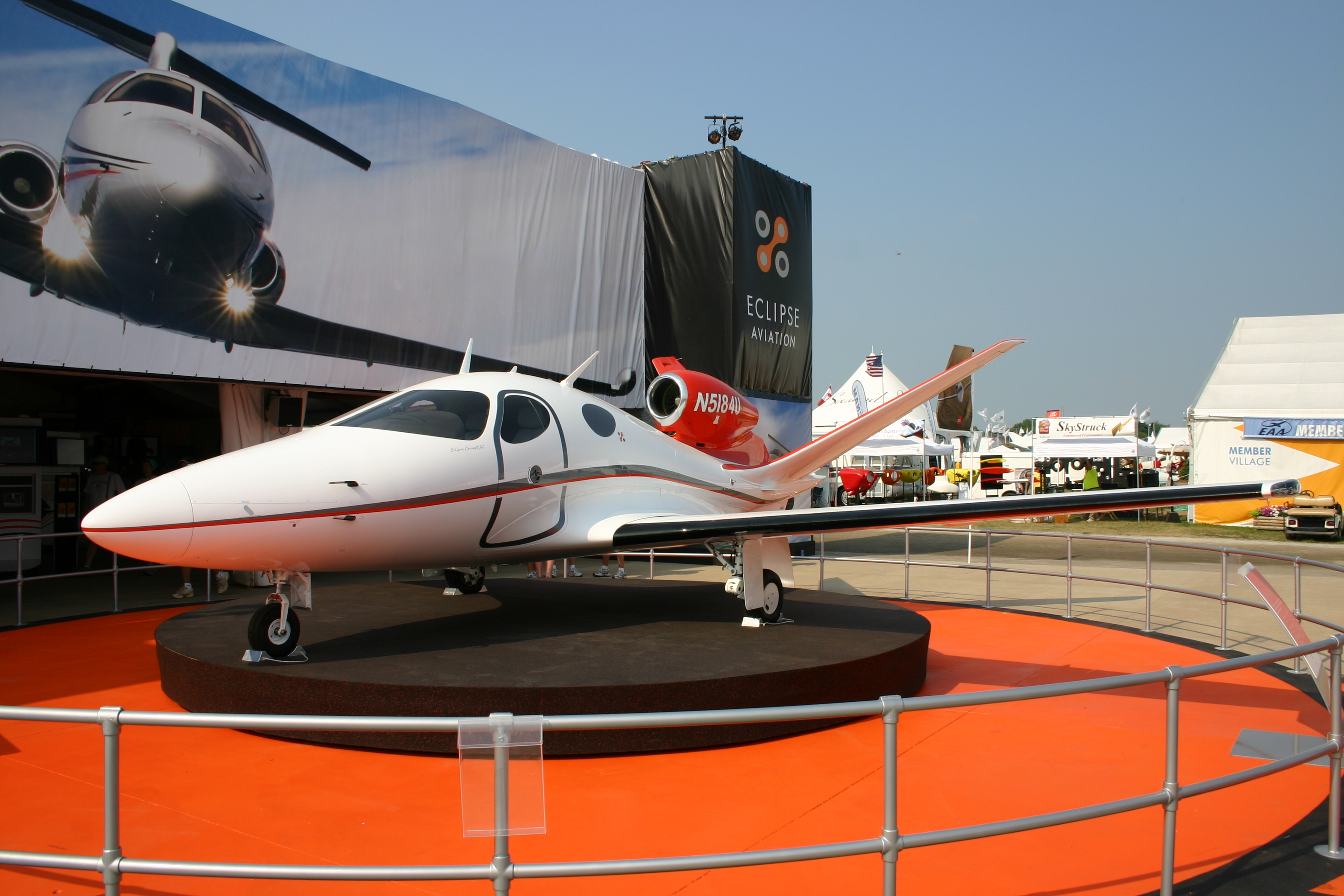
Eclipse 400 very light jet in 2007

Eclipse Aviation was founded by Vern Raburn in 1998 in Scottsdale, Arizona, and the company started to design the twin-engined Eclipse 500 very light jet. Due to investments by the State of New Mexico and incentives and concessions from the City of Albuquerque, the company set up its production facilities there and moved its headquarters in 2000. Construction of the prototype started in 2001, and it first flew on August 26, 2002. Originally powered by two Williams International EJ22 turbofans, these were found to be unsuitable, and the aircraft was redesigned to accommodate a pair of Pratt & Whitney Canada PW610F-A turbofans. The engine change caused a delay in the program, and the PW610F-equipped prototype first flew in 2004. The aircraft was FAA certified on July 27, 2006; the first customer aircraft was delivered in January 2007. European Aviation Safety Agency certification for private use was achieved on November 21, 2008.

In February 2006, the company was named the winner of the Collier Trophy for 2005 by the National Aeronautic Association for its work with the Eclipse 500. The award was controversial because only the prototype aircraft was flying.

On July 23, 2007, at AirVenture in Oshkosh, Wisconsin, Eclipse unveiled the already flying prototype of a second company design initially called the Eclipse Concept Jet. The four-seat aircraft was powered by a single Pratt & Whitney Canada PW610F turbofan and was built in secrecy at NASA's Wallops Flight Facility in Virginia by Swift Engineering and BaySys Technologies. The ECJ had first flown on July 2, 2007. The company said it did not intend to place the aircraft into production, but by May 2008, it began to take orders for a production version designated the Eclipse 400.

In October 2007, the company laid off between 100 and 150 contract workers and employees, about 10% of its workforce. In November 2007 subcontractor Hampson Aerospace, which built the tail assembly for the Eclipse 500, filed a suit against Eclipse alleging that Eclipse had not paid them for work completed.

During 2007 Eclipse produced 104 aircraft and claimed a record for building its "first 100 airplanes faster than any GA jet aircraft manufacturer in history."

=== Financial challenges and decline ===
Founding president and CEO Vern Raburn resigned as a condition of a financing package by European Technology and Investment Research Center (ETIRC) Aviation, which had invested more than US$100 million in Eclipse in 2008. Raburn announced his resignation at AirVenture on Monday, July 28, 2008. The new CEO, Roel Pieper, the chairman of the board of directors and president of ETIRC, said that the company should be profitable by the first quarter of 2009.

Despite orders for the aircraft, the company announced in August 2008 that development of the Eclipse 400 was on hold and it had not started the certification process. The company declared it had not spent any of the deposit money for the Eclipse 400, but the deposits were later the subject of legal action.

On Wednesday, August 20, 2008, Hampson Aerospace closed its Grand Prairie production plant, leaving Eclipse without a supplier of tail sections.

On August 22, 2008, Eclipse announced that it would be laying off 650 of its workforce of 1800 people (38% of its work force) and a week later Pratt & Whitney Canada repossessed 24 engines sold to Eclipse.

From August 2008 onwards, several customers filed lawsuits against the company for failure to return deposits for canceled and delayed orders. The company indicated that it needed more funding to be in a position to return deposits.

On September 19, 2008, Eclipse's largest customer, DayJet, representing 1400 orders for the Eclipse 500, ceased flying operations for financial reasons.

Eclipse Aviation announced on September 23, 2008, that it would establish a factory in Ulyanovsk, Russia to assemble the Eclipse 500, but then halted production of the 500 in October 2008, with the company indicating that it lacked funds to continue production or refund customer deposits.

=== Bankruptcy and liquidation ===
On November 21, 2008, the company announced that it had achieved EASA certification for the 500 and then just four days later, on November 25, 2008, filed for Chapter 11 bankruptcy protection. The company was "seeking court approval for debtor-in-possession financing and procedures for the sale of substantially all of its assets under Section 363 of the U.S. Bankruptcy Code." The company also stated that it had found a buyer for its assets, EclipseJet Aviation International, an affiliate of ETIRC Aviation, the company with significant investments in Eclipse.

Bankruptcy documents indicated that a total of $702.6 million was owed. The court documents filed suggested that the bankruptcy occurred because the company "continued to lose larger than expected sums of money on each aircraft manufactured and has not reached cash flow positive in its operations." Total company liabilities were estimated at over $1 billion. At the time of bankruptcy filing on November 25, 2008 Eclipse had delivered 259 EA500s.

On January 20, 2009, Federal Bankruptcy Court Judge Mary Walrath verbally approved the sale of the assets of Eclipse Aviation to EclipseJet Aviation International, headed by Eclipse Aviation's chairman, Roel Pieper, under Section 363 of the United States Bankruptcy Code. EclipseJet Aviation International was unable to secure the funding they had anticipated, and on February 24, 2009, a group of companies to whom Eclipse owed money applied to the court to force the unfinished Chapter 11 proceedings into Chapter 7, a move supported by the company management.

After a lengthy Chapter 7 process running from March to August 2009, only one bidder for the company's assets existed. Eclipse Aerospace, headed by Mike Press and Mason Holland, offered US$20M in cash and US$20M in new promissory notes, stating that they would locate the new company in the existing Eclipse facilities in Albuquerque. Eclipse Aerospace provided upgrades to the current Eclipse fleet and restarted production. Eclipse Aerospace was confirmed as the new owner of the assets of the former Eclipse Aviation on August 20, 2009, and opened for business on September 1, 2009. The company later merged to become One Aviation, and it subsequently went bankrupt in 2018.

== Other products ==
Eclipse Aviation pioneered the use of friction stir welding in aircraft structures, using it extensively in the primary structure of the Eclipse 500.

Eclipse also developed PhostrEx, a fire suppression agent for use in aviation applications to replace halon, a greenhouse gas. Eclipse Aviation developed it for use aboard their Eclipse 500 jets, and it is now being marketed to other aviation manufacturers.

== See also ==
- Aspen Avionics
- Williams V-Jet II
