= Aspen Avionics =

- Industry: Aerospace
- Founded: 2004
- Headquarters: Albuquerque, New Mexico, United States
- Key people: John Uczekaj, Peter Lyons, Jeff Bethel
- Website: www.aspenavionics.com

Aspen Avionics is an American aircraft avionics manufacturer.

Aspen specializes in producing aftermarket EFIS display systems that retrofit into certified general aviation aircraft. The Evolution Flight Display system family is the company's main product line.

Aspen was founded by former Eclipse Aviation employees Peter Lyons and Jeff Bethel in 2004. In 2007, Aspen expanded into a 27,000 sq ft (2,500 m^{2}) manufacturing plant in New Mexico.

Aspen entered into a co-operative agreement with avionics manufacturer Avidyne to produce compatible products. In 2012, the companies released the DFC90 Autopilot, which integrates with Aspen displays and shares AHRS signals.

In 2021, the company was acquired by AIRO Group.

== Major Products ==
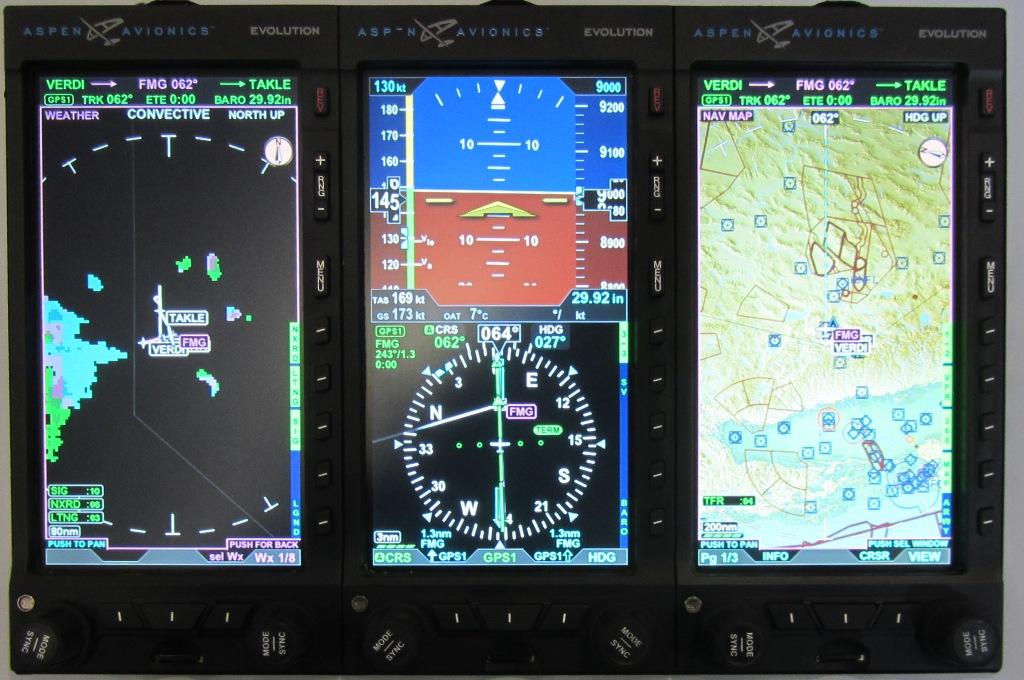
Aspen Evolution

- AT300 Hazard Awareness Display (2005) Electronic VSI and Terrain Avoidance system.
- Evolution EFD1000 (2008 FAA Certification) Drop-in EFIS display.
