= Eclipse 400 =

Prototype single-engine very light jet

Eclipse ECJ / 400
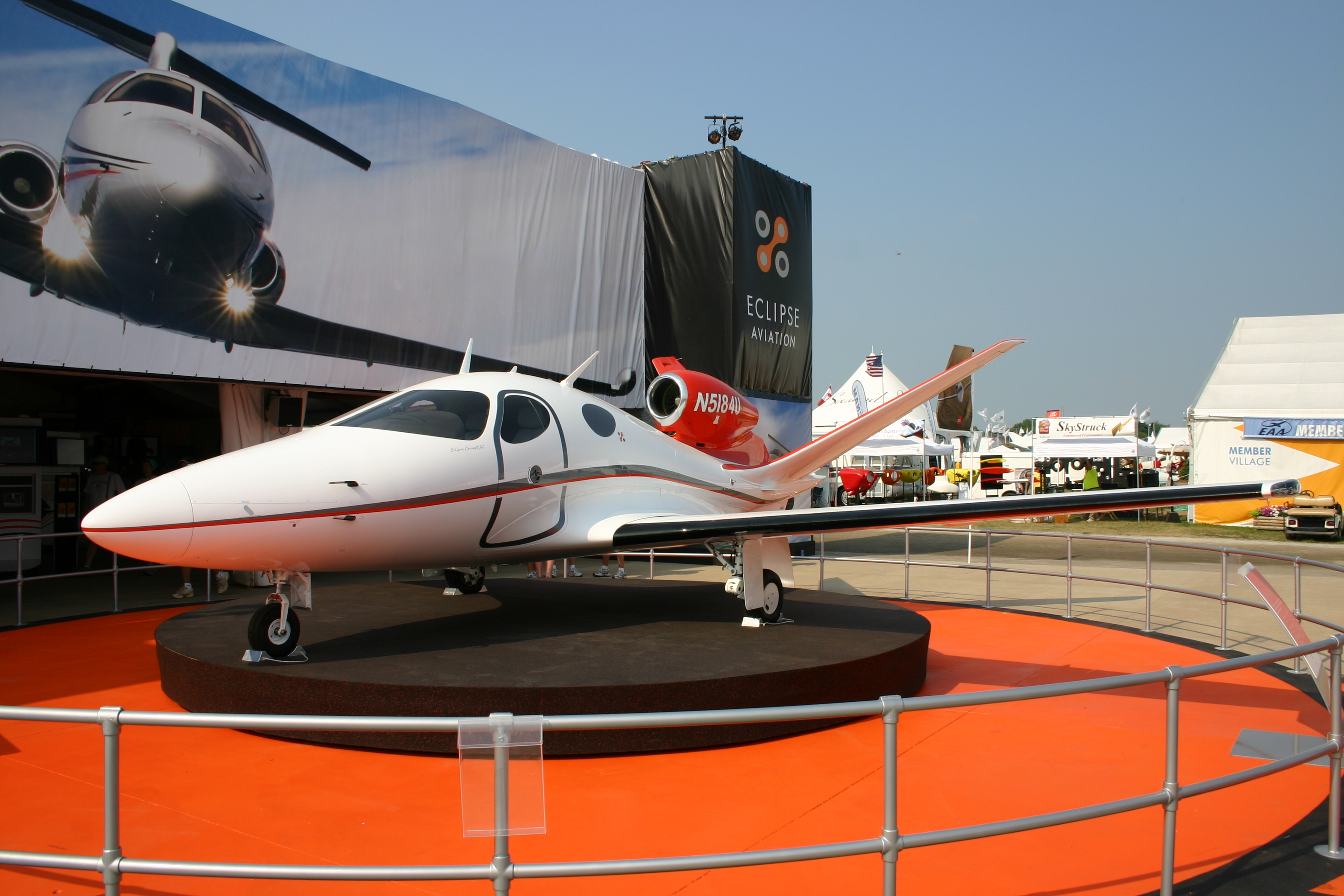

General information
- Type: Civil utility aircraft
- Manufacturer: Eclipse Aviation and Swift Engineering
- Status: Project cancelled after company bankrupted in November 2008
- Number built: One prototype

History
- First flight: July 2, 2007
- Developed from: Eclipse 500

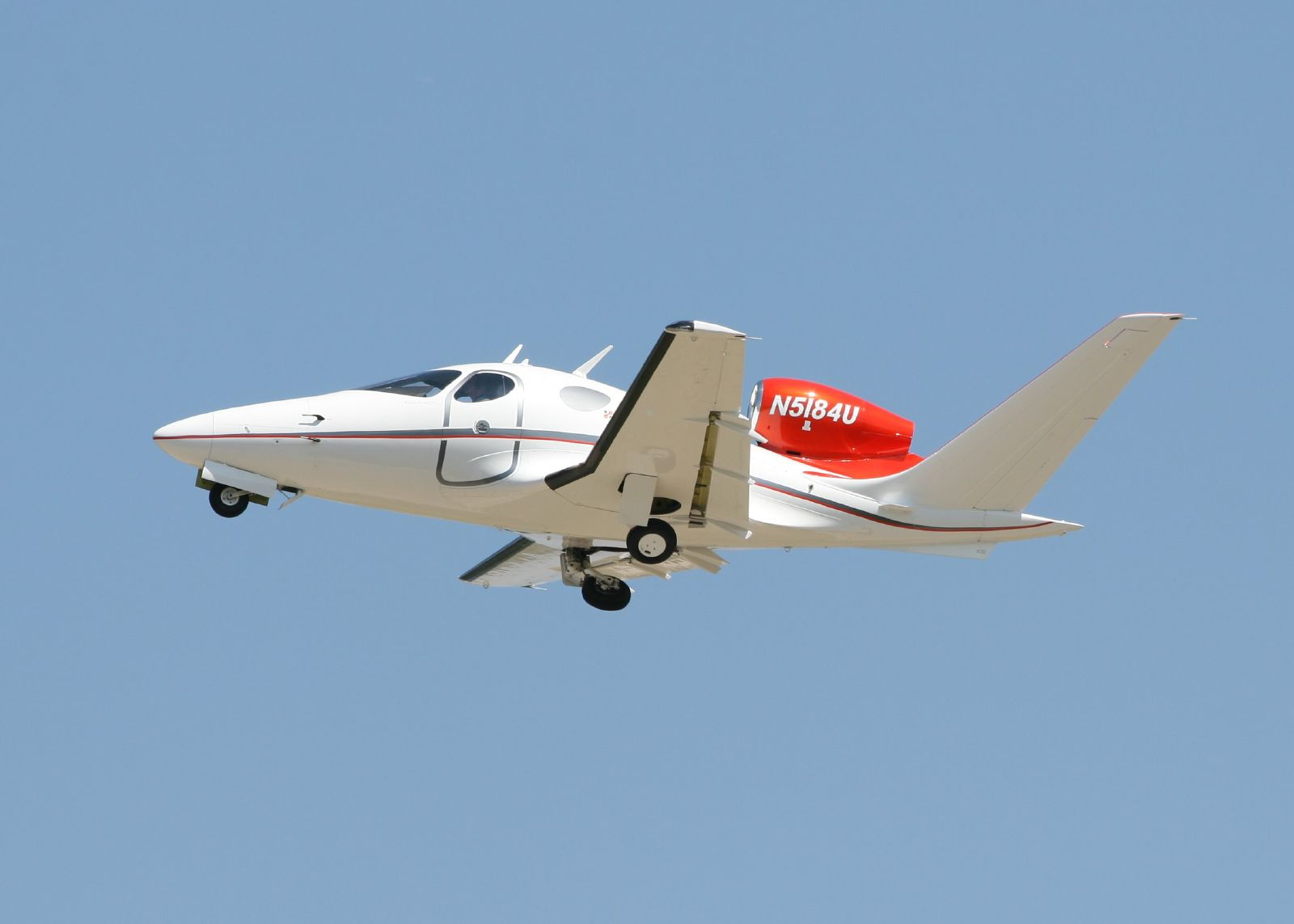
Eclipse 400 at the 2007 EAA Oshkosh Airshow

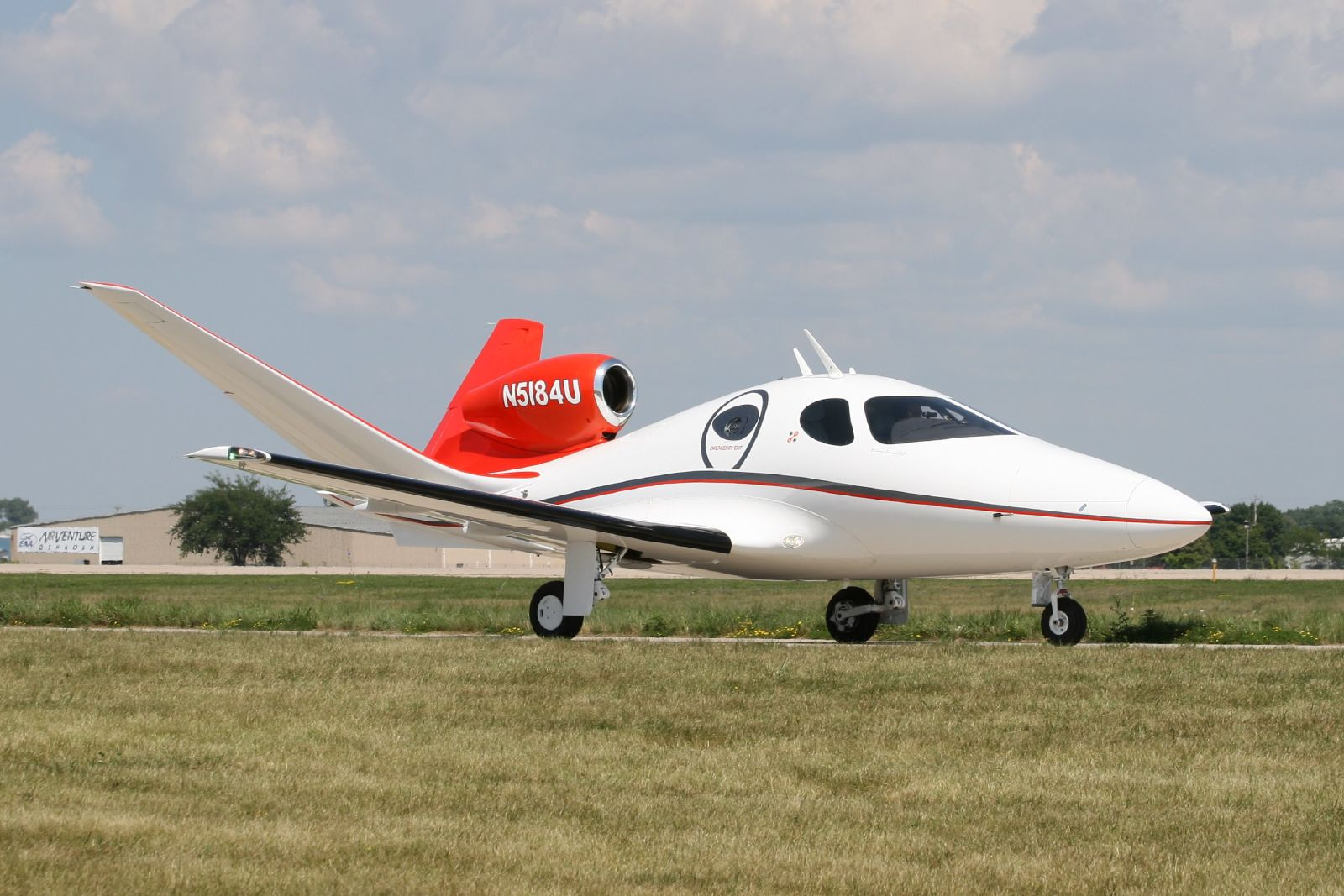
Eclipse 400 taxiing

The Eclipse 400 (formerly Eclipse Concept Jet, or ECJ) is a single-engine very light jet that was designed by Eclipse Aviation and Swift Engineering.

A development of the Eclipse 500, the Eclipse 400 prototype first flew in 2007 and was cancelled when the Eclipse company went bankrupt in 2008.

== Design and development ==
The Eclipse 400 was first publicly unveiled on 23 July 2007 at AirVenture as the Eclipse Concept Jet (ECJ). The aircraft was intended to compete with the Cirrus Vision SF50, the Piper PA-47 PiperJet, the Epic Victory, and the Diamond D-Jet in the single-engine jet market. The Eclipse 400 design featured one engine, four seats and a V-tail similar to the Cirrus Jet.

The four-seat prototype, registered N5184U, is powered by a single Pratt & Whitney Canada PW610F turbofan, first flown on 2 July 2007. It was built in complete secrecy at NASA's Wallops Flight Facility in Virginia by Swift Engineering and BaySys Technologies. Swift Engineering had been tasked with designing and building a single-engine business jet in just 200 days, up to the aircraft's first flight. The prototype aircraft has 60% parts commonality with its larger Eclipse 500 sibling.

At the time of its announcement the company said that the aircraft would have an expected cruise speed of 345 kn (639 km/h) at 41,000 ft (12,497 m) with an IFR range of 1,250 nmi (2,315 km). The aircraft was designed for a 4,800 lb (2,177 kg) gross weight, 2,480 lb (1,125 kg) empty weight, 2,000 lb (907 kg) useful load and a fuel capacity of 1,261 lb (572 kg).

When the prototype was initially unveiled the company said that it did not intend to produce the aircraft.

Eclipse CEO Vern Raburn said:

The Eclipse Jet will allow us to obtain real, quantifiable data that looks at this developing category. While today we have no production plans for the ECJ, we are constantly evaluating markets for future Eclipse products…we are anxious to reveal the potential of this emerging category, and out opportunity to add real value to it.

On 30 May 2008, Eclipse Aviation began taking orders for a production version of the ECJ, the Eclipse 400. The 400 was at that time priced at $1.35 million and deliveries were expected to begin by the fourth quarter in 2011.

At AirVenture in July 2008, new Eclipse CEO Roel Pieper confirmed that if sufficient orders were placed for the 400, production would commence in 2011. Pieper also stated: "If there's not sufficient interest we'll give their (deposits) back...The 400 will get a very specific program. It will not be allowed to influence the 500 in any way."

In August 2008 in a communication to position holders, the company indicated that development of the Eclipse 400 was on hold. In October 2008 when asked "if the Eclipse 400 project was a go or not, Eclipse said it has not begun the certification process. The company also said it has not spent any of the deposit money for the four-place, single-engine VLJ."

In October 2008 industry analysts The Teal Group and Forecast International both issued independent analyses indicating that Eclipse faced bankruptcy by the end of the first quarter of 2009 and this development was expected to terminate development of the Eclipse 400. Eclipse Aviation entered Chapter 11 bankruptcy on 25 November 2008. Even though the purchase agreements for Eclipse 400s stated that the US$100,000 deposit was refundable upon request anytime before November 2009, reports in December 2008 indicated that deposits were not refunded upon request and that the company did not return phone calls on the subject.

Court documents filed by Eclipse 400 position holders as part of the bankruptcy hearings allege that the company misappropriated the US$3.2M collected from depositors, did not escrow it as contracted to do so and refused to refund it when required to. The assets of the company were sold to EclipseJet Aviation International by court order on 23 January 2009 and the fate of the deposits became the subject of an adversarial court action at that time. The sale to EclipseJet was not completed and the company entered Chapter 7 liquidation, the company assets, including the Eclipse 400 prototype, going to Eclipse Aerospace. That predecessor company merged into a new company in 2015, One Aviation, which subsequently went bankrupt in 2021 without ever pursuing development of the Eclipse 400.

== Specifications ==
Reference: Eclipse website

General characteristics

- Crew: one-two pilots
- Capacity: two-three passengers
- Length: 29 ft 0 in (8.84 m)
- Wingspan: 36 ft 0 in (10.98 m)
- Height: 8 ft 10 in (2.69 m)
- Empty weight: 2,480 lb (1,125 kg)
- Gross weight: 4,480 lb (2,032 kg)
- Powerplant: 1 × Pratt & Whitney Canada PW615F turbofan , 1,200 lbf (5.3 kN) thrust

Performance

- Cruise speed: 380 mph (612 km/h, 330 kn)
- Range: 1,445 mi (2,315 km, 1,256 nmi)
- Service ceiling: 41,000 ft (12,500 m)

== See also ==
- Very light jet

Aircraft of comparable role, configuration, and era

- Cirrus Vision SF50
- Epic Victory
- Flaris LAR01
