= Ed Iacobucci =

American businessman and technologist (1953-2013)

Edward "Ed" E. Iacobucci
- Born: September 26, 1953; Buenos Aires, Argentina
- Died: June 21, 2013 (aged 59); Boca Raton, Florida, United States
- Occupation: Technology entrepreneur
- Known for: Cofounder of Citrix Systems

Edward E. Iacobucci (September 26, 1953 – June 21, 2013) was an Argentine-American businessman who founded VirtualWorks and co–founded Citrix Systems. He is also known for his work as the architectural designer of the OS/2 and IBM DOS systems and as a virtualization pioneer.

== Biography ==
=== Early years and education ===
Edward "Ed" E. Iacobucci was born September 26, 1953, in Buenos Aires, Argentina to Dr. Guillermo and Costantina Iacobucci. His father, a biochemist, moved his family to the U.S. in 1960 to work first for E.R. Squibb & Sons (a predecessor to pharmaceutical giant Bristol-Myers Squibb), and then Coca-Cola. Roberto Goizueta, then Chairman of Coca-Cola, became a close friend of the Iacobucci family and, subsequently, Ed's godfather.

Iacobucci graduated from Georgia Tech with a BSc in systems engineering in 1975.

=== Career ===
Iacobucci began his career at IBM in 1979 where he worked on the commercial software and personal computer business. While at IBM, Iacobucci held architecture and design leadership responsibilities for IBM DOS and OS/2, and led the joint IBM-Microsoft design for multi-tasking personal computer operating systems.

In 1989, Iacobucci left IBM to co-found Citrix Systems. He led the company as chairman and chief technology officer through its market and product development phases. Citrix grew and was named to both the Nasdaq 100 and S&P 500 indexes. In 1997, Iacobucci forged a five-year joint development agreement with Microsoft to include Citrix's multi-user capabilities within Microsoft Windows NT Server. He served as chairman of Citrix through 2000, when he retired.

In 2002, Iacobucci co-founded and served as president and CEO of DayJet Corporation, an on-demand airline service that sold individual seats via a time sensitive pricing scale and utilized the Eclipse 500 very light jet. Dayjet built a computer system for solving highly complex optimization problems, and announced a five-year strategic agreement with the U.S. Federal Aviation Administration (FAA). After starting operations in 2007, DayJet ceased operations in 2008 when it was no longer able to secure its planned growth capital.

Between 2002 and 2007 he was a member of the SCO Group's board of directors.

In 2011, Iacobucci founded VirtualWorks (later renamed to Ayfie), an enterprise search engine company. for which Iacobucci served as president and CEO until May 20, 2013, when he stepped down for personal health reasons.

== Awards ==
In 1998, Iacobucci received the Ernst & Young "International Entrepreneur of the Year" award.

Iacobucci sat on the engineering advisory board for Georgia Tech, his alma mater. He served as a technology judge at the state and national level for the Ernst & Young "Entrepreneur of the Year Awards", and he was active in the Junior Achievement organization.

== Death ==
He died of pancreatic cancer on June 21, 2013, at his home in Boca Raton, Florida, U.S.
