= DayJet =

American on-demand jet taxi service

DayJet Corporation
IATA	ICAO	Call sign
-	DJS	DAYJET
- Founded: January 2002; 24 years ago
- Ceased operations: September 19, 2008; 17 years ago
- Hubs: DayBases: Boca Raton, Gainesville
- Secondary hubs: Lakeland, Tallahassee, Saint Petersburg/Clearwater PIE, Orlando Executive Airport, Pensacola, Naples, Sarasota/Bradenton, Jacksonville, Savannah, Opa-locka/Miami-Dade County, Montgomery, Macon
- Focus cities: Jacksonville, St. Petersburg/Clearwater, Orlando, Lakeland, Macon, Miami/Opa-locka, Montgomery, Naples, Pensacola, Sarasota, Savannah, Tallahassee
- Subsidiaries: DayJet Technologies, LLC
- Headquarters: Boca Raton, Florida (2007-2008) Delray Beach, Florida (until 2007)
- Key people: Ed Iacobucci, founder Nancy Lee Iacobucci, founder
- Website: www.dayjet.com archives

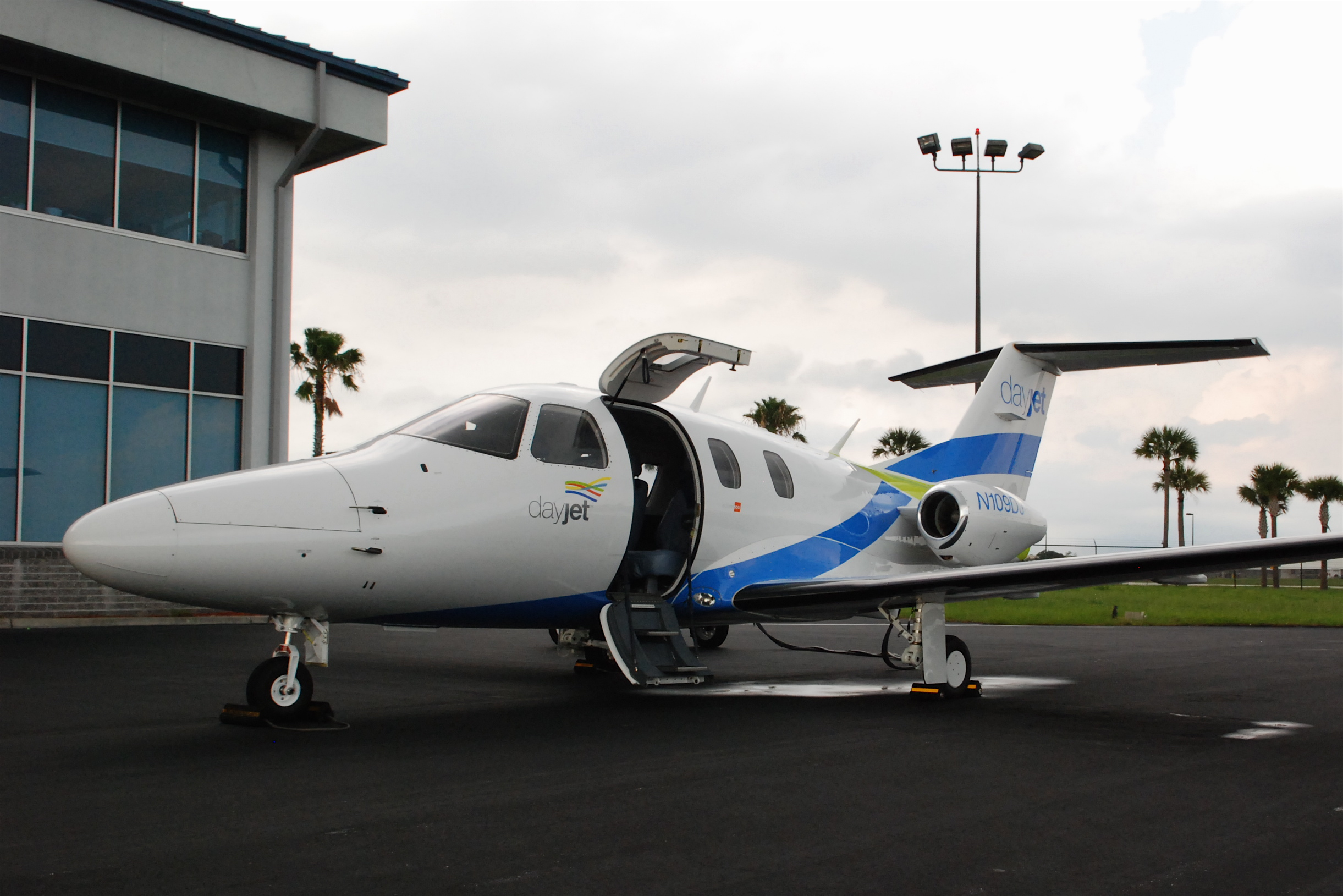
DayJet Eclipse 500

DayJet was an American commercial aviation operation that provided on-demand jet travel using Eclipse 500 very light jets. Founded by Ed Iacobucci, the former leader of the IBM-Microsoft Joint OS/2 development team IBM executive and the founder of Citrix Systems, and his wife, network architect Nancy Lee Iacobucci, DayJet launched in October 2007. It was based in Delray Beach, Florida.

Described by its founders as an on-demand jet taxi service, DayJet raised $61 million in venture funding, entered into a five-year agreement with the U.S. Federal Aviation Administration and purchased 28 Eclipse 500 jets (4- and 6-seaters) at the cost of $1.5 million each before suspending operations on September 19, 2008, during the height of the 2008 financial crisis.

DayJet was Eclipse Aviation's largest customer with a planned eventual delivery of 1,400 aircraft representing a majority of the estimated 2,500 Eclipse 500s on order.

Its headquarters were in Delray Beach, Florida.

DayJet had 239 orders for the Eclipse 500, and was expected to place 70 more by 2010. The first delivery of three Eclipse 500 aircraft took place on March 31, 2007.

== History ==
=== May 2008 financial problems ===
On 6 May 2008, DayJet announced a scaling back of its operations and the laying off of 100–160 employees in all segments of the company. The company also sold or leased out 16 of the 28 Eclipse 500s it owned.

DayJet founder and CEO Ed Iacobucci indicated that the company needed an investment of US$40M at that time to reach profitability, but that the economic climate did not permit the company to raise that amount. Iacobucci stated that the company had proven that the per seat time sensitive pricing air taxi operational concept is sound, but that the carrier's fleet needed to be quickly expanded to fifty aircraft to reach profitability.

Despite cutting its fleet, the air carrier announced on 21 May 2008 that they were expanding their service by making two more destinations in Florida, Jacksonville and Sarasota, into hub airports DayJet designates as "DayPorts". In July 2008, both Saint Petersburg/Clearwater and Orlando, Florida were added as hub DayPorts.

=== September 2008 suspension of operations ===
The company announced the following news on 19 September 2008:

DayJet Services, LLC, the world’s first operator of “Per-Seat, On-Demand” jet service, today announced that it has ceased jet services, pending further notice. The company today eliminated most employee positions. With the discontinuation of jet services and cancellation of all flights, DayJet is unable to honor any customer reservations.

The company indicated that given the current economic climate in the USA it is unlikely that flying operations will be resumed.

The company also announced a change in management on 19 September 2008, stating:

Iacobucci has stepped down as DayJet President and CEO but continues to serve as Chairman of the Board of Directors. John Staten has been named interim CEO with responsibility for managing the affairs of the company during the next phase of operations. Staten has served as DayJet CFO and Senior Vice President of Operations for the past six years.

In November 2008, Iacobucci indicated that he was still attempting to raise capital to restart the company and that it would be a smaller, scaled back operation. He also stated at that time that there were a number of problems that caused the company to cease operations, but that the key issue was the 2008 financial crisis.

In analyzing DayJet's situation Iacobucci said that problems with Eclipse had contributed, but that the Eclipse 500 was the best choice for DayJet when it was starting up due to its purchase price and projected maintenance costs. Using the Eclipse 500 also permitted DayJet to start with a single aircraft type for the whole fleet. Iacobucci indicated in November 2008 that he was still pursuing investors, but would not be committing more of his own money, having already invested US$20 million.

Iacobucci did not place blame for the company's problems on the choice of the Eclipse 500, saying, "It’s not the flippin’ airplane".

=== Sale of DayJet fleet ===
Eclipse Aviation announced in October 2008 that they were acting as "the exclusive broker" for the sale of the existing 28 DayJet aircraft.

Canadian light aircraft fractional aircraft company OurPlane bid on the entire DayJet fleet of aircraft, offering more than "$500,000 each but less than $1.5 million" each. OurPlane operated a fleet of Cirrus SR22 aircraft and one current Eclipse 500 until its bankruptcy in October 2010. OurPlane had planned to offer its customers one-quarter shares in the Eclipse 500s for less than US$449,000.

OurPlane did not complete the purchase of the DayJet fleet and the aircraft became the property of Eclipse Aerospace, the new company that purchased the assets of Eclipse Aviation from Chapter 7 bankruptcy in August 2009. Eclipse Aerospace indicated that they intend to upgrade and sell the aircraft.

== DayJet Technologies ==
At the time of DayJet's bankruptcy, a group of investors took control of DayJet Technologies, the technology subsidiary, and attempted to operate as a private technology company .

== See also ==
- List of defunct airlines of the United States
