= Sloot Digital Coding System =

Alleged data encoding technique

The Sloot Digital Coding System (SDCS) is an alleged technique for data encoding claimed to have been invented in 1995 by Romke Jan Bernhard Sloot (1944–1999), an electronics engineer in the Netherlands. Sloot claimed his system could represent an entire feature film with only one kilobyte of data, a level of compression which is mathematically impossible according to Shannon's source coding theorem.

Sloot demonstrated the technology by recording and playing back video, apparently using a small smart card which stored a unique identifier by which any possible video could be referenced. He convinced entrepreneurs Roel Pieper, Marcel Boekhoorn, and Tom Perkins to invest in the technology. However, several days before the conclusion of a contract to sell his invention, Sloot died of a sudden heart attack, and his source code was lost forever. His claims have never been reproduced or verified. Contrary to his claims, the playback device he used was discovered to contain a hard drive.

Software engineer Adam Gordon Bell speculated that Sloot had come upon a variation of shared dictionary compression, a known technique. He speculates that Sloot believed in his idea because he failed to understand its mathematical limitations, and faked the demonstrations in order to buy time while refining the details.

== Background ==
Sloot was born in Groningen on 27 August 1944, the youngest of three children. His father, a school headmaster, left his family quite soon after Sloot's birth. Sloot was enrolled at a Dutch technical school, but dropped out early to work at a radio station. After fulfilling mandatory military service, Sloot settled in Utrecht with his wife. He worked briefly for Philips Electronics in Eindhoven. He left this job in 1978 after a year and a half, starting his next job in Groningen at an audio and video store. A few years later he moved to Nieuwegein where he started his own company repairing televisions and stereos.

In 1984, Sloot began focusing on computer technology such as the Philips P2000, Commodore 64, IBM PC XT, and AT. Sloot developed the idea of a countrywide repair service network called RepaBase with a database containing details on all repairs carried out. This concept was the motivation to develop alternative data storage techniques that would require significantly less space than traditional methods.

== Sloot Encoding System ==
In 1995, Sloot claimed to have developed a data encoding technique that could store an entire feature film in only 1 kilobyte. For comparison, a very low-quality video file normally requires several megabytes, and a 1080p movie requires about 3 gigabytes (3,221,225,472 bytes) per hour of playing time. As of 2022, just the plain text alone of the Dutch Wikipedia page describing the film Casablanca occupies 29 kilobytes.

Roel Pieper, former CTO and board member of Philips, is quoted as saying (translated from Dutch):

It is not about compression. Everyone is mistaken about that. The principle can be compared with a concept as Adobe-postscript, where sender and receiver know what kind of data recipes can be transferred, without the data itself actually being sent.

Pieter Spronck rebuts Pieper's codebook analogy by pointing out that Sloot claimed his invention was capable of encoding any video, not only those videos composed from a particular finite set of "recipes".

In the [Sloot Digital Coding System], it is claimed that no movies are stored, only basic building blocks of movies, such as colours and sounds. So, when a number is presented to the SDCS, it uses the number to fetch colours and sounds, and constructs a movie out of them. Any movie. No two different movies can have the same number, otherwise they would be the same movie. Every possible movie gets its own unique number. Therefore, I should be able to generate any possible movie by loading some unique number in the SDCS.

Think of it: by placing the right number in the SDCS, I can not only get Orson Welles' Citizen Kane — I can get Citizen Kane in colour! Or Citizen Kane backwards! Or Citizen Kane where the credits misspell the name of Everett Sloane[!...] Or Citizen Kane where Charles Foster Kane is replaced by Jar Jar Binks!

How many movies are possible that are variations on Citizen Kane? More than fit in a number of one kilobyte, I can tell you.

In 1996, Sloot received an investment from colleague Jos van Rossum, a cigarette machine operator. The same year, Sloot and van Rossum were granted a 6-year Dutch patent for the Sloot Encoding System, naming Sloot as inventor and van Rossum as patent owner. The patent does not describe a compression scheme matching the claimed capabilities of the Sloot Encoding System.

Despite the impossibility of the encoding system, Sloot received further investment. In early 1999, Dutch investor Marcel Boekhoorn joined the group. In March 1999, the system was demonstrated to Pieper. Pieper resigned from Philips in May 1999 and joined Sloot's company as CEO, which was re-branded as The Fifth Force, Inc. The story — including an account of a demonstration in which Sloot apparently recorded and replayed a randomly selected 20-minute cooking program on a single smartcard — is told in modest detail in Tom Perkins' 2007 book Valley Boy: The Education of Tom Perkins.

== Death of Sloot ==
On July 11, 1999, Sloot was found dead, in his garden at his home in Nieuwegein, of an apparent heart attack. He died one day before the deal was to be signed with Pieper. The family consented to an autopsy, but none was performed.

Perkins, the co-founder of the Silicon Valley venture capital firm Kleiner Perkins, had agreed to invest in the technology when Sloot died. Perkins and Pieper would have proceeded after Sloot's death, but a key piece of the technology, a compiler stored on a floppy disk, had disappeared and, despite months of searching, was never recovered.

After his death, a software engineer Sloot had worked with analysed Sloot's demonstrations. Despite Sloot's claim that his coding system stored all of its data on smart cards, his demonstration device was found to contain a hard disk. Bell says that Sloot seems to have believed that he had created a novel encryption technology, but posthumous analysis suggests that he had actually created a variation of shared dictionary compression, a known data compression technique with predictable and finite mathematical limitations. Bell speculates that Sloot thought he could overcome these limitations with better coding, and faked the demonstrations to buy time to improve the code, but that the inherent mathematical limitations of the coding system would have inevitably proven impossible to overcome.

I think Sloot thought his system could work, that he could find a way to store all possible movies in his RepaBase encoding system and look each up with a key, but he just hadn't cracked it yet. And yet, in the meantime, to get people interested, while he worked out the details, Yeah, he faked some demos. He said it's not compression, this is a key to unlock the movie. But ... there are more possible movies than can be represented with a one kilobyte key. A one kilobyte key is like less than one bit per frame of a two hour movie. It's like trying to give a unique name to a billion people using just a thousand names. No matter how you rearrange it, you can't avoid some people getting the same name.

== See also ==
- Lost inventions
