= Vandersloot =

Vandersloot is a surname. Notable people with the surname include:

- Courtney Vandersloot (born 1989), American-Hungarian basketball player
- Joran van der Sloot (born 1987), Dutch convicted murderer
- Frank L. VanderSloot (born 1948), American entrepreneur, radio network owner, rancher, and political campaign financier
