= Roel Pieper =

Dutch IT-entrepreneur

Roland "Roel" Pieper (born 1956, Vlaardingen, Netherlands) is a Dutch IT-entrepreneur.

== Early life and education ==
Pieper was born (April 13, 1956) in Vlaardingen, son of an engineer at a car manufacturer. His father died when Pieper was 20, and on his 18th birthday he suffered a motoring accident which destroyed his sporting career as a player of the Juventus Schiedam basketball team. According to Pieper, both of these experiences instilled him with a certain toughness. Pieper obtained his MSc - Ir - degree from the Delft University of Technology, 1980, in computer science.

== Career in the United States ==
After graduation, he worked for ten years for Software AG (both in Germany and in the United States), where he became chief technology officer for the US branch. After leaving Software AG he was selected to be the chief executive officer (CEO) for Unix System Laboratories in the United States, a division of Bell Laboratories of AT&T. In 1993, after the resignation of co-founder Ralph Ungermann, Roel became the president and CEO of Ungermann-Bass. Ungermann was tied to Tandem Computers by an earlier White Knight deal and Ungermann resigned after his required term. Roel renamed the company UB Networks while it was a subsidiary of Tandem Computers. Roel restructured UB Networks research investments into ATM technology, which was popular at the time, instead of continuing Ralph Ungermann's earlier successful investments and leadership in Ethernet technology. Ungermann-Bass developed the first Virtual Network Architecture (VNA) in 1993. The ATM business was subsequently sold by Roel to Cisco. UB Networks itself was sold to Newbridge Networks successfully in 1996 after Pieper joined Tandem Computers as CEO. In 1996 Pieper became president and CEO of Tandem Computers where he was instrumental in repositioning the company. Under Pieper's leadership Tandem was sold to Compaq in 1997, and Pieper became a member of the executive board of Compaq. During his time in the US, Pieper gained a reputation as a successful restructurer. Under Pieper's leadership, USL, UB and Tandem Computer were successfully restructured and sold to strategic players in the industry.

== Career in the Netherlands ==
Pieper returned to the Netherlands in 1998. For one year he was board member of the Dutch electronics giant Philips by invitation of Cor Boonstra, then Philips' president. This involvement ended abruptly in May 1999 when Pieper got involved in the claimed coding technology of Jan Sloot, a connection Pieper made on behalf of Philips. Philips officially decided not to use the technology. Pieper then decided to support the invention as a private investor and later also as board member, though Sloot's claimed huge compression is mathematically impossible. The inventor died of a heart attack shortly after he demonstrated his technology to a group of 20 investors and technology companies in the summer of 1999. After one year, Pieper ended his employment at Philips with a severance package of undisclosed value.

In 1998, together with ex-minister of economy Hans Wijers, Pieper set up Twinning, an incubator for starting entrepreneurs, particularly in the IT and especially the Internet sector. The project received ninety Million Guilders of government subsidy, and as the Dot-com bubble burst, the ministry decided to sell Twinning to a group of private investors. Of the fifty companies that Twinning started, more than 35 are still operating and some very successfully.

Pieper also independently took part in more than 30 IT businesses all as investor and or adviser. On 1 September 1999 Pieper was appointed as a professor of Electronic Commerce, a newly created chair at the faculty of informatics and technology management of the University of Twente. Pieper ended as a professor of business administration and corporate governance at the university of Twente in 2013.

At the end of 1999, Pieper founded Insight Capital Partners Europe, a private investment fund for IT-businesses, later operating under the name of Favonius Ventures, particularly in the field of e-commerce. In November 2000 he became chairman of the board of Lernout & Hauspie, a Flemish company specializing in speech recognition technology. Pieper was instrumental in uncovering a financial scandal at this company, which took place in the period 1996–1999, before he joined the company. In cooperation with the Belgian authorities, Pieper helped to secure information that ultimately led to the formal charging of the founders Jo Lernout and Pol Hauspie. Pieper left as chairman of the board after the shareholders decided to appoint a new CEO and board.

In 2001, Pieper entered into the board of advisors of Nearshore IT services company, Levi9 Global Sourcing and conducted a study requested by minister Tineke Netelenbos for setting up a system for road pricing, called Mobimiles. Later that year he became president of Connekt, an organisation for addressing road tolling issues in the Netherlands. He presided as chairman for seven years.

== Favonius Ventures ==
In 2001 with financial backing from private institutions, ING, CalPERS, and ABN AMRO, he established Favonius Ventures with offices in London and Amsterdam. In July 2006, Favonius Ventures received all of the technology investments of ABN AMRO Capital which is the private equity business unit of ABN AMRO Bank N.V.

== Eclipse Aviation ==
In 2003, Pieper started a new venture involving Very Light Jets (VLJ), in cooperation with Albuquerque, New Mexico-based Eclipse Aviation Corporation.

After Semyon Bolotin (Russian: Семен Болотин; born 1985 or 1985) and a son of Roel Pieper, who had gone to school together and played on the same basketball team, introduced their fathers to each other, Roel Pieper and the Russian businessman Daniel Bolotin established in Luxembourg a joint venture investment business, which was headquartered in The Netherlands, called European Technology and Investment Research Center, or ETIRC BV. (Note: Daniel Bolotin was formerly known as Yevgeny Bolotin (Russian: Евгений Болотин; born in Mogilev, Byelorussian SSR, USSR), lived among Israel, Netherlands and Germany, and was very close to Alexander Korovnikov (Russian: Александр Коровников)) ETIRC, which had offices in Russia, Ukraine, Kazakhstan, Cyprus, Turkey and Israel, used The Netherlands as a gateway for investments between the West and eastern Europe, Turkey, Russia and countries of the CIS. Bolotin and Pieper had a 42.7% stake in ETIRC Aviation and a 14.6% stake was held by the Cyprus-firm Martilio Holdings Ltd. which was controlled by Svyaz-Bank.

In 2007, ETIRC launched a joint venture with the luxury goods provider Atasay whose founder Atasay Kamer's son Cihan Kamer is very close to Recep Tayyip Erdogan and is known as Erdogan's "Golden Man" (Turkish: Erdoğan'ın "Altın Adamı").

The main project of ETIRC was ETIRC Aviation, which sought to establish an Air Taxi network for Europe, Turkey and Russia and a second manufacturing location for the Eclipse 500 jet at Ulyanovsk Oblast in Russia for the European market. In July 2008, the Luxembourg-based ETIRC Aviation, which by then had become Eclipse Aviation's largest shareholder, ousted Eclipse Aviation founder Vern Raburn from his position as CEO. Pieper then took over the job of acting CEO for Eclipse Corporation at the request of the shareholders and bondholders.

Before the collapse of Svyaz-Bank and its subsequent takeover by VEB, both Bolotin and Pieper received a $150 million loan from Svyaz-Bank in December 2007 for their purchase of Eclipse Aviation to rebrand the company as Eclipse Aerospace.

In the autumn of 2008, after Pieper had decided to raise the price of the Eclipse 500 aircraft substantially, several Eclipse customers sued Eclipse for the return of their deposits, claiming they had waited years for the delivery of their Eclipse 500 jets. After the collapse of the financial markets in autumn of 2008, the company Eclipse needed to be restructured and filed for Chapter 11 bankruptcy, with the stated plan that a new company, headed by Pieper, would buy the assets of Eclipse and continue manufacturing. Pieper attempted to secure the necessary funds for this acquisition, but was unsuccessful largely due to the economic downturn, which led to several potential investors bowing out at the last moment. Eclipse Aviation ran out of money in mid-February 2009, ceased operations, and laid off its remaining 850 employees. On February 25, a group of creditors petitioned the Delaware bankruptcy court to convert Eclipse's bankruptcy to Chapter 7 liquidation. Soon thereafter, the board of directors (including Pieper) acknowledged the company had no other options but to file for Chapter 7, effectively ending the company's 10-year run, during which it spent an estimated $2 billion in investments and loans. Various reports following the Chapter 7 filing of the company insinuated financial problems for Pieper including an email from Pieper himself

On 7 April 2009, following the Chapter 7 filing of Eclipse Aviation, ETIRC BV in the Netherlands also declared bankruptcy. The Dutch newspaper de Volkskrant reported that Pieper had invested US$146 million in Eclipse through ETIRC. Roel Pieper has two lawsuits pending on the demise of ETIRC BV. The first case led by a group of consultants who claim to not have been paid for six months was lost. including a delay and review of a case by a legal firm that specialises in take-overs and bankruptcy claims, and Al Mann, who had Roel Pieper sign a 10 million collateral before he would invest 20 million in Eclipse. Al Mann and Roel Pieper have subsequently settled out of court Although in a court case of 2016 there were still outstanding issues with Mann. in 2019 documents revealed that Roel Pieper had an outstanding debt of 19 million euros and that assets in the Netherlands were being seized.

This investment was done with non-collateral US$150 million credit of Russian Sviaz-bank or Svyaz-Bank (Russian: Связь-банк). The Russian newspaper Vedomosti reported that this credit became later an object of an investigation in Russia, of which Pieper was not a part.

At the same time he was fighting to save Eclipse, Pieper was investing tens of millions of dollars in a Russian technology to extract diesel fuel from coal. The Coal to Liquid project is on hold and will restart when oil prices have reached prices again above 100 dollars per barrel.

== Failures and successes ==
Various successful companies include Veritas Software, Netwise, Quokka Sports, Google, TiVo, Netscape, General Instrument, Lost Boys, and various others. Some failures include a magazine, Opinio, much older projects such as a web site, Tradingcars.com, and the telecommunications company Stonehenge. Efforts to start MyGuide, a company specializing in GPS navigation units and meant to compete with TomTom, also failed. Roel Pieper has been held accountable by the receivership of MyGuide for the lack of an administration, a coherent strategy and inferior products. There is currently a claim of 2 million Euros pending, which Pieper claims to be erroneous. At the trial it was noted that he maintained bad bookkeeping but due to the nature of the law was unable to be held personally accountable. As a result, all cases around MyGuide have been closed.

As of 2015 Roel Pieper had a court case pending regarding outstanding legal fees from Goodwin Procter which as of 2016 has been ruled in favour of Goodwin Proctor. In 2016 the Goodwin Proctor lawsuit was settled out of court in a mutual agreement between all parties.

== Pursuit Dynamics ==
In 2009 Pieper was appointed CEO of UK-based production technology firm, Pursuit Dynamics. He subsequently left the firm on 15 December 2011 as a result of a conflict with some shareholders who forced a rights issue which was announced after the company failed to meet revenue targets. Pieper resigned after the board of directors decided to support the rights issue strategy demanded by one group of shareholders. The company subsequently was unable to return to its full potential as the rights issue created a period of high volatility and uncertainty. The company in fact never survived that decision and was unable to attract any substantial new business. The company sold its assets and was effectively liquidated.

== RiRo Ventures ==
Since 2002 the Pieper family has invested in a number of high tech ventures. The investments are not limited to a geography or to a specific sector. In a number of these ventures the strategic direction of the investments becomes evident. New energy, engines, propulsion and a number of unique IT technologies such as the Antenna Company which was founded and funded together with Marcel Boekhoorn who is a long-term business partner and friend of the family. Since the failure of Eclipse Aviation due to the financial crisis in 2009, most of Pieper's activities have been related to the RiRo Ventures main investments. A new website describing these activities has been created recently named after the successor company BJMD Ventures. Both RiRO Ventures and BJMD Ventures are part of a family fund structure created to support investments globally.

== Personal life ==
In May 2003, Pieper was target of an attack by a confused deranged man who broke into his house in Aerdenhout, and stabbed his wife who made a full recovery. Pieper publicly blamed the Dutch police as the attacker was caught trespassing on the property, including with video proof, on previous occasions. The Dutch police refused to act until the attack almost killed Pieper's wife. The man who stabbed Pieper's wife was convicted and sentenced to compulsory psychiatric treatment in a closed judicial institute (Terbeschikkingstelling in the Dutch language). He then was granted a temporary leave in 2007. The man has since been reinstated into supervised custody. Pieper emigrated to Monaco in March 2008. The stated reason being that he was not informed, or was informed far too late, by the police or Ministry of Justice of this temporary leave of the attacker, although the government officials had promised to do so in writing.

In the summer of 2007, Pieper became one of the major stakeholders of the Amsterdam Basketball Club and was also working with the city of Amsterdam on a new youth project for integration and education focuses on sports. After Pieper emigrated in March 2008, Pieper no longer was involved with Amsterdam Basketball which closed its doors in April 2011 after it was unable to attract new sponsors to remain in the first league of basketball in the Netherlands. The club BC Apollo has since been revived to become the largest basketball club in the Netherlands with plans to return to the first (ere-) division of basketball after winning the championship in the second division. In the years after, the BC Apollo has returned successfully to first premier league of basketball in the Netherlands.

In the summer of 2008, Pieper was helmsman on the Favonius yacht (Swan 82) and he successfully claimed the Swan World Cup in Porto Cervo, Italy. Together with his longtime associate and navigator Roy Heiner, Pieper finally won this event after various attempts. The hobby of sailing and regattas were given to Pieper by his father who taught him sailing and racing at a very young age. Pieper's father bought a small yacht called Favonius in 1974 and as a remembrance Pieper always tried to use that name as part of his memories of his father. In 2013 Pieper has assisted in creating the K3 Foundation in Portland, Oregon, USA. The target of the foundation is to restore and maintain the globally well known sailing yacht Kialoa III. The yacht has successfully returned to the racing scene in 2015.

In the years after 2014, Pieper has been active in Ukraine in a number of investment projects. One of the projects is related to establishing the bio ethanol market based on the huge supply of corn in Ukraine. In addition, several high tech agricultural projects have been started to determine if a cooperation between the Netherlands and Ukraine could be established successfully. One of the projects Agri Cooperative Europe has been created in 2017.

Pieper had three sons in his first marriage, three sons in his second marriage and currently lives with his third family in Kyiv, Ukraine. His 7th son Roland Pieper Jr, was born in August 2017, in Kyiv.
