= Hampson Industries =

Hampson Industries plc
- Company type: Public (LSE: HAMP)
- Industry: Aerospace; Automotive
- Founded: 1947
- Headquarters: Brierley Hill, UK
- Key people: Norman Jordan, (Chairman); Kim Ward, (CEO)
- Revenue: £157.9 million (2008)
- Operating income: £22.4 million (2008)
- Net income: £5.3 million (2008)
- Number of employees: 1,830 (2008)
- Website: www.hampsonindustries.in

Hampson Industries plc was a large British provider of engineering services to the aerospace and automotive industries. The company was listed on the London Stock Exchange and was a constituent of the FTSE Fledgling Index. It was placed in administration in November 2012.

== History ==
The company was founded by Thomas "Tommy" Hampson Silk in 1947 in West Bromwich as an electrical engineering concern. It was first listed on the London Stock Exchange in 1966. In 1997 it acquired Arabis Machining Group.

It expanded into the United States in 2004 with the acquisition of Texstars Inc. Further acquisitions in the United States followed in 2005 with Coast Composites Inc. and Lamsco West Inc., in 2007 with Composites Horizon Inc. and in 2008 with Odyssey Industries Inc. and Global Tooling Systems Inc. for £158m.

In November 2012, American Industrial Partners (AIP) acquired the five U.S. operating aerospace subsidiaries of Hampson Industries and formed AIP Aerospace, LLC. Coast Composites, Global Tooling Systems, Odyssey Industries, and Texstars now trade under Ascent Aerospace. The company, having got into financial difficulties, then appointed an administrator later that month.

== Operations ==
The company was organised as follows:

- Aerospace components and structures - includes engine casings for the Eurofighter Typhoon
- Automotive - includes components for turbochargers for Audi and other makes of car
