= Diamond D-Jet =

Very light jet in Austria

D-JET
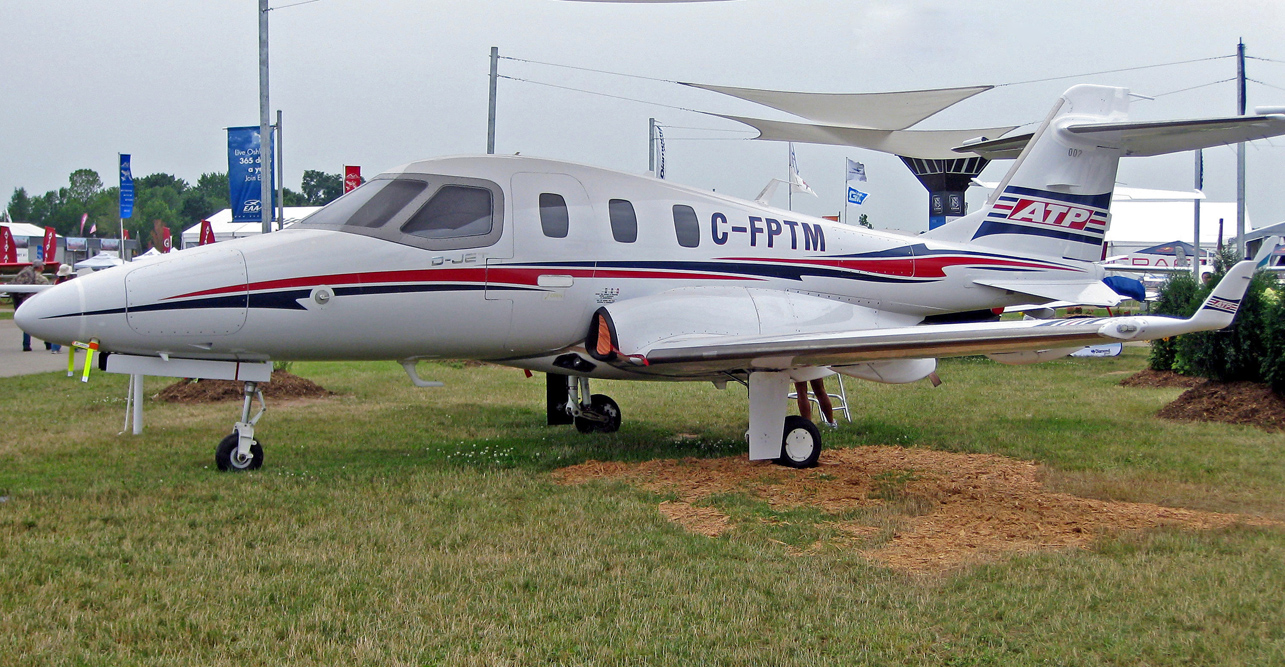
- The second prototype D-jet exhibited at EAA AirVenture Oshkosh in July 2010

General information
- Type: Very light jet
- National origin: Austria
- Manufacturer: Diamond Aircraft Industries
- Status: Development suspended (Feb 2013)
- Number built: 3 prototypes

History
- First flight: 18 April 2006

The Diamond D-JET is a composite, five-seat, single-engine very light jet developed by Austrian aircraft manufacturer Diamond Aircraft Industries. The intended cost for the aircraft was advertised by the company as being US$1.89 million dollars in March 2009.

Development of the D-JET has been disrupted by funding shortfalls during the Great Recession. By February 2013, the development program had been suspended pending company reorganization, which included the workforce related to the D-JET being laid off. During May 2014, Diamond confirmed the continued suspension of the programme, but stated that it had not been cancelled. During December 2016, a majority share of Diamond Aircraft Canada was sold to Chinese firm Wanfeng Aviation; reportedly, this shall result in a detailed re-assessment of the D-JET program, including options for the potential resumption of its development.

== Development ==
=== Early development ===
During 2006, Austrian aircraft company Diamond Aircraft announced that it was engaged in the development of a very light jet, which it referred to as the D-Jet. At the time, the company stated that it had targeted the design at the owner-pilot market, viewing the type as possessing greater practical for single-pilot operations than competitive jets, such as the Eclipse 500 and the Cessna Citation Mustang. By limiting the maximum altitude of the D-JET to 25,000 feet, any instance of a pressurization failure would be rendered as less critical emergencies. Diamond intended for the D-JET to possess a lower operating cost than other very light jets.

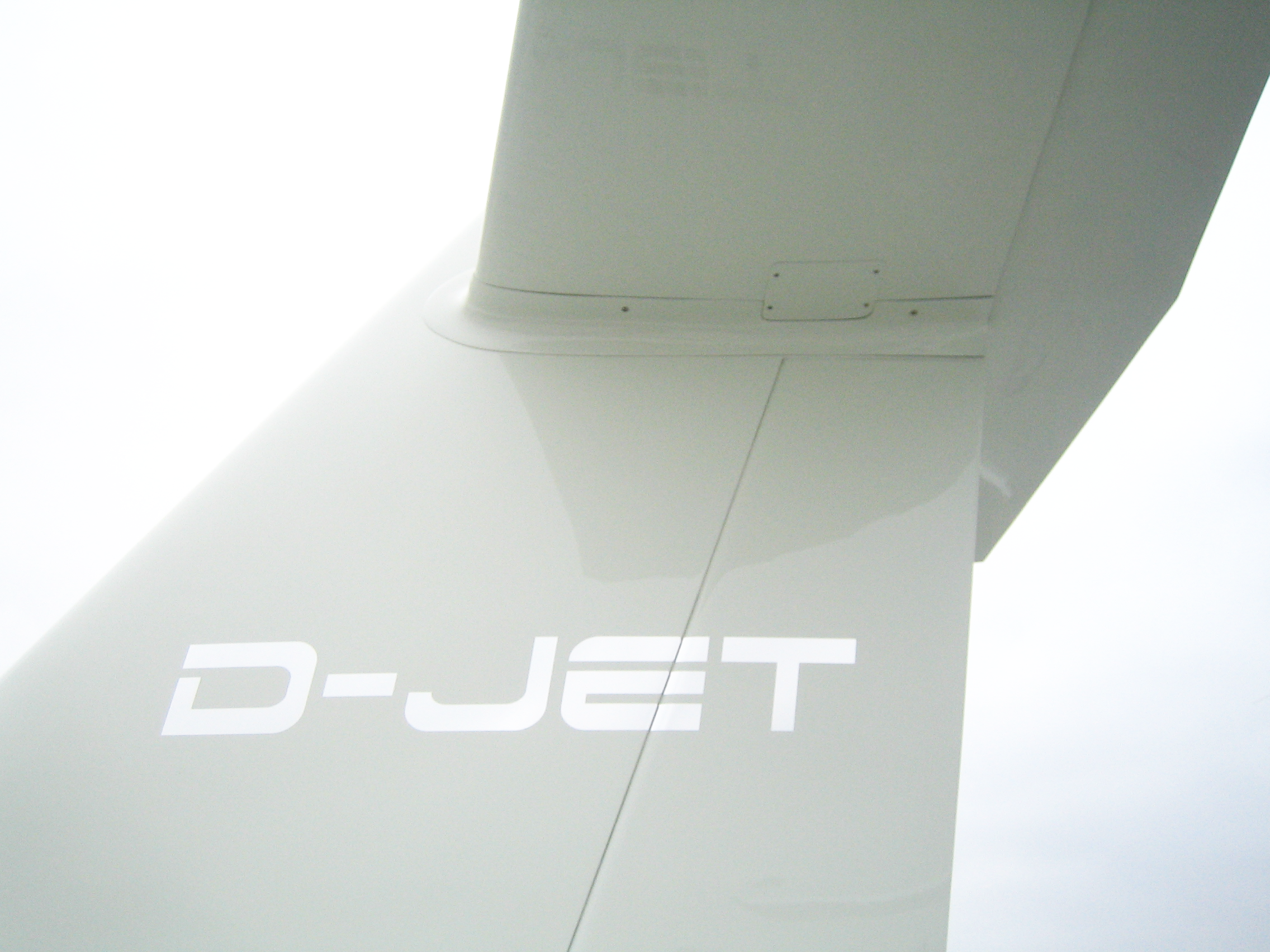
The Diamond D-JET, partially assembled at the Oakland NBAA, 8 November 2007

On 18 April 2006, the maiden flight of the D-JET was conducted from the London International Airport (ICAO: CYXU) in Ontario, Canada the homebase of Diamond's North American division. The flight was piloted by test pilot Gérard Guillaumaud and lasted 1:06 hours. The aircraft's public debut was at Oshkosh in July 2006. At that time Diamond expected certification to be complete by the middle of 2009 with deliveries starting at the same time.

On 9 November 2006, at the AOPA Expo in Palm Springs, California, United States, Diamond announced that ATP Flight School (ATP) had placed the first fleet order for 20 D-JETs. At that point, the declared intention was that ATP would provide factory-approved training to D-JET purchasers beginning in 2008. Toronto-based Chartright Air Group also placed an order for 10 D-JETs, it was announced that this order came with an expected delivery window set to occur during 2010.

On 20 July 2007, Diamond Aircraft announced the roll out of its second D-JET, serial number 002. Serial number 002 is the first D-JET intended to conform to the expected production configuration in its structural layout and aerodynamic design. D-JET prototype serial number 002 first flew on 14 September 2007. It was joined by D-JET Serial Number 003, which first flew on 15 April 2008.

During February 2008, Diamond announced that the aircraft was to be manufactured in a new facility located in London, Ontario, Canada. At the time, Diamond claimed that total research and development costs for the D-JET were set to be around Cdn$95.2 million and that the plant to construct the type had been anticipated to cost an additional $100 million. This announcement of the manufacturing details came shortly after an announcement by the Government of Canada that it had issued the company with a "Cdn$19.6 million strategic, repayable investment", while the Government of Ontario had separately announced that it had given Diamond Cdn$11 million. The Government of Ontario loan was contingent on a matching loan from the federal Canadian government, however, this was ultimately not approved; this failure to emerge was attributed as having heavily impacted efforts to progress the D-JET programme.

The D-JET was initially to be powered by a single Williams FJ33-4A-15 turbofan engine, capable of producing 1,564 lbf (6.96 kN) of thrust. However, during early 2008, the engine was determined to produce insufficient bleed air to feed systems such as cabin pressurization and other functions; as a result, a decision was made to switch to a more powerful version of the same powerplant, designated as the FJ33-4A-19, which was capable of producing 1,900 lbf (8.5 kN) of thrust. The switch in engines was responsible for a delay in the D-JET's certification schedule which then resulted in the projected first customer deliveries being pushed back into the spring of 2009.

During October 2008, Canadian charter operator SwiftJet announced that they had ordered five D-Jets with options for ten more. SwiftJet's intention is to offer air taxi service "anywhere and anytime to destinations around the world." At the time, SwiftJet operated a single Dassault Falcon 20 in the charter role. During 2010, it was revealed that Diamond was also undertaking development work upon a military trainer variant of the D-JET, which was reportedly intended to be sold for under US$3M; amongst the believed changes intended for the trainer role included the installation of Martin-Baker-built lightweight ejection seats.

=== Funding shortfalls and suspension ===
Flight testing and program development was halted in the spring of 2011 as the company lacked funds to proceed. After a failed campaign for federal government support, private investment was found and test flight resumed in September 2011.

During July 2012, the company announced that 700 hours of flight testing had been completed, during which the prototypes had attained a top speed of Mach 0.56 (346 kn (641 km/h) true airspeed) along with 30,000 pressurization cycles on a test fuselage. Around this time, a set of winglets were installed upon the prototype with the aim of improving roll control throughout the entirety of its speed range, especially during stall conditions. Following this addition, the design was frozen and the company proceeded to commence the construction of production tooling for the fourth serial aircraft. At this time, certification of the D-JET was forecast to occur during late 2013, while the first deliveries of production aircraft were to commence during the third quarter of 2014.

During April 2012, Maurer indicated that other companies had been hiring their laid-off workers, especially engineers. American manufacturer Piper Aircraft announced that as many as 25 engineers may be moving to Vero Beach, Florida to work on their own personal jet programme, the Altaire. Media reports also indicated that Canadian conglomerate Bombardier Aerospace may have issued offers to up to 85 workers to work on the Learjet 85 in Wichita, Kansas. Maurer said that the loss of laid-off workers will hurt a restart of the D-Jet program should government funding be approved and described the situation as "dire".

At the end of April 2011, Maurer issued a public appeal in the London Free Press for the C$35M loan from the Government of Canada, indicating that if it was not forthcoming that the company might cease operations. Maurer also indicated that the hiring of his laid-off staff by competing firms might lead to its termination regardless, saying "With the loss of this team, the building of a replacement team would add cost and time that the program and company may not survive." By mid-May, the company had hired back 11 engineers to prevent other companies picking them up and was hoping to have a decision on the federal loan request after a new cabinet is sworn in.

In analyzing the declining of the loan, Joseph D'Cruz of the University of Toronto Rotman School of Management indicated that in his opinion the government made the right decision in turning Diamond down. He said, "It's such a high risk, nobody in their right mind would invest...That particular market for that aircraft is a relatively small market and it's unproven....Could this jet go ahead without government assistance? The answer is a definite 'no,' because it's not viable without the federal government."

During May 2011, Maurer said that he had always considered the Canadian government loans a "long shot" and that the company was looking at other sources of funding to bring the D-Jet to market, including potential Chinese investment. On 14 June 2011, the company announced that it secured private financing from an unnamed source and started recalling its workers, indicating that it would build an extra test aircraft and resume flight testing. Flight testing started again in early September 2011.

During February 2013, having not located further operational funding after the failed sale of the company to Medrar in 2011, the company laid off the majority of its Canadian staff and suspended work on the D-Jet program, indicating that the company needed to reorganize. By May 2014, work on the D-Jet remained suspended, but the project had not been cancelled. The program remained suspended in February 2016. Following the sale of a majority share of Diamond Aircraft Canada to Wanfeng Aviation of China in December 2016, a re-assessment of the D-Jet program for possible resumption of development will be conducted.

== Design ==
The Diamond D-JET is a very light jet aircraft, seating up to five personnel and powered by a single engine. A key attribute of the design was its high level of stability during flight, which was reportedly present through its full envelope even during challenging manoeuvres. As a result of its clean exterior design, the D-JET possesses relatively low drag, enabling the aircraft to glide in excess of 65 miles from its 25,000-foot ceiling altitude. The cabin of the D-JET was intended to feature various design elements to enhance onboard comfort, such as the proposed seating layout and the low vibration levels present during flight, for both passengers and crew. The center cockpit pedestal is cantilevered to ease entrance and egress in comparison to some competitors. Separated baggage compartments are located within the interior of the aircraft's nose and to the aft of the main cabin, both of which being externally accessed.

The D-JET is powered by a single Williams FJ33-4A turbofan engine, which is equipped with an electronically controlled full-authority digital engine control (FADEC) system. Various functions, such as engine startup and over-speed selection prevention, have been automated and are seamlessly performed by the FADEC system. For redundancy, the dual-channel FADEC system uses four independent electrical power sources in addition to battery backup. Diamond opted to adopt a centerline location for the engine, air for which is fed through inlets embedded into the wing roots. The central location of the engine places makes it close to the center of gravity of the D-JET, reducing pitch forces, however, there are some drawbacks to this approach, including elevated air losses within the ducting arrangement used and a greater likelihood of foreign object ingestion.

According to aviation publication Flying Magazine, the controls of D-Jet "feel completely natural...stability is excellent, and I found the workload to be very low". Akin to most jet aircraft, possessing a wide range between minimum and maximum airspeeds, the D-Jet has a larger pitch trim range than a piston-engined counterpart, thus use of the trim control through the takeoff and landing procedures is necessitated to a greater degree than propeller-driven aircraft. The D-Jet is outfitted with relatively large slotted flaps, which were reportedly crucial to achieve the 61-knot maximum stall speed certification required by any single-engine aircraft. These flaps, which resulted in no meaningful pitch changes during retraction or extension, were designed to ease their usage.

The avionics of the D-JET comprise a Garmin G1000 glass cockpit, the large multi-function display of which taking center-place on the cockpit dashboard, akin to aircraft such as the Citation Mustang. For de-icing purposes, Diamond opted for pneumatic boots on the wing's leading edges, bleed air for heating the inlets and ducts, and electric heating for the windshields and probes; in particular, Goodrich developed a considerably thinner de-icing system for the D-JET. The landing gear is electrically actuated on later-built prototypes; atypically, the landing gear is designed to be used as an air brake during landing approaches, being deployable at speeds as high as 200 knots. Maneuvering on the ground was achieved via a nosewheel steering system, actuated via a mechanical linkage to the pedals. According to Diamond, the D-JET could be operated from 3,000-foot runways, assuming that they are both dry and uncontaminated.

== Specifications (D-JET) ==
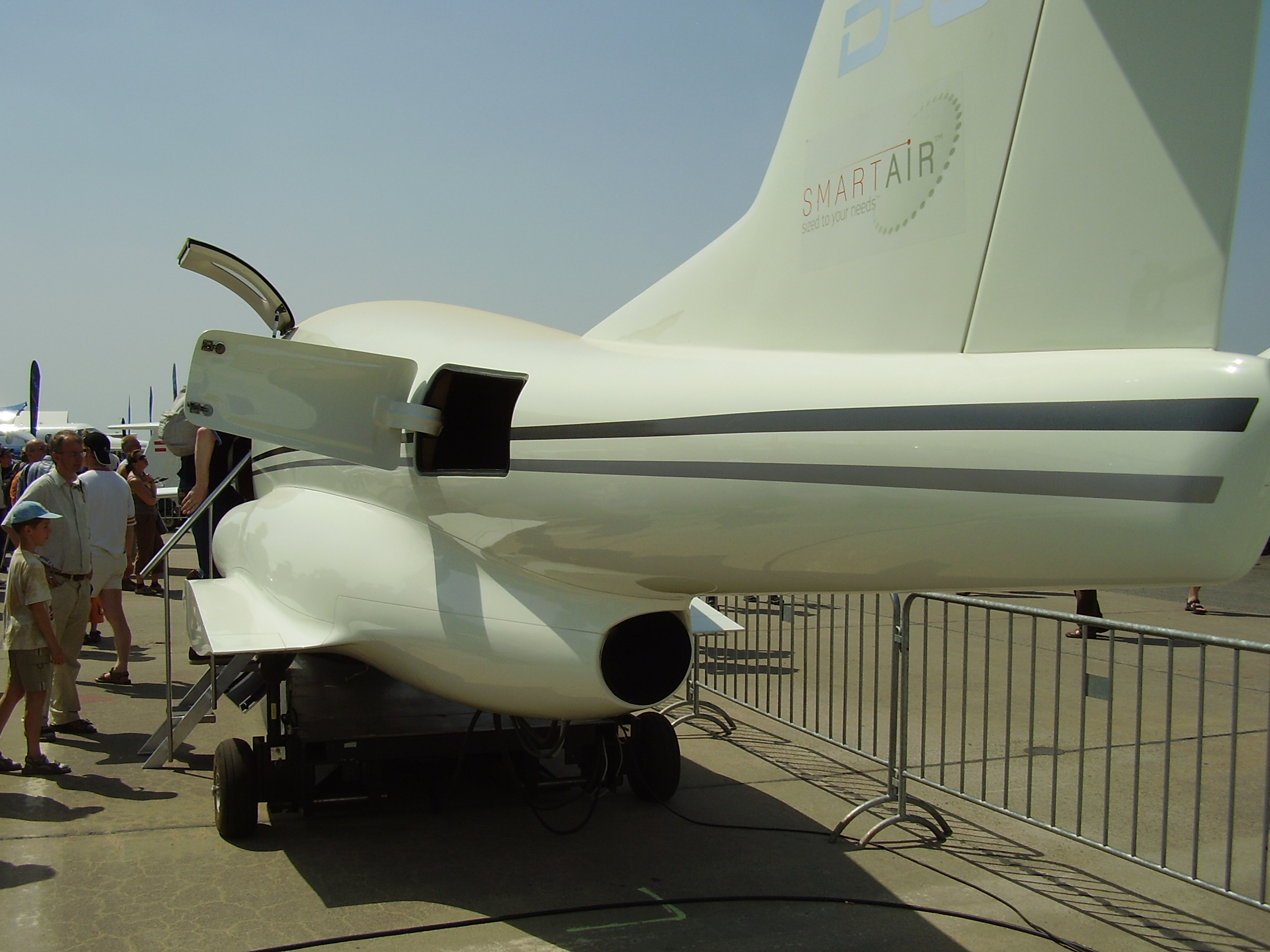
Rear fuselage with engine exhaust below the tail

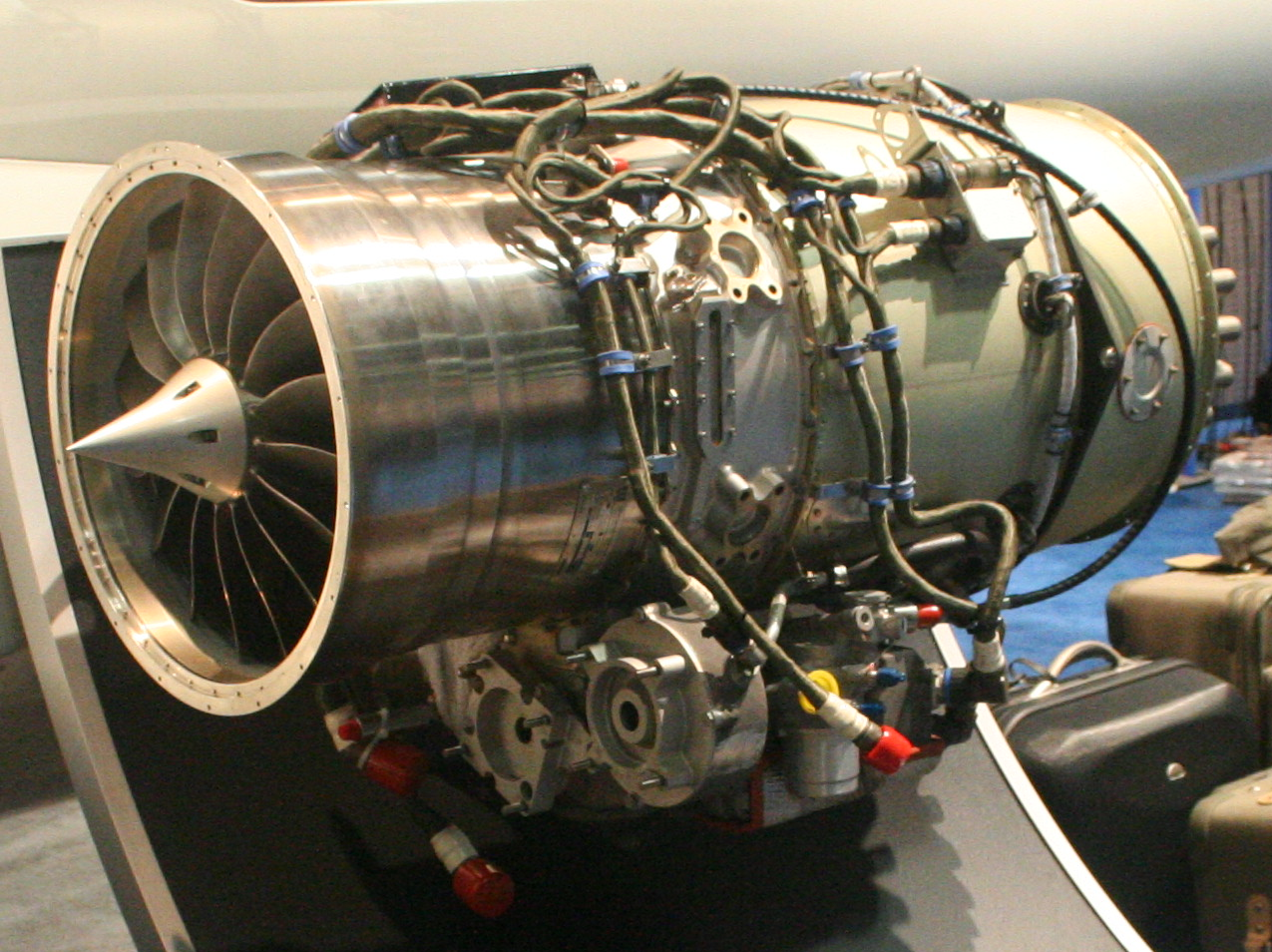
A mockup of the D-JET's engine, the Williams FJ33-4A turbofan

Data from Diamond Aircraft

General characteristics

- Crew: one, pilot
- Capacity: four passengers
- Length: 10.7 m (35 ft 1 in)
- Wingspan: 11.5 m (37 ft 9 in)
- Height: 3.6 m (11 ft 10 in)
- Gross weight: 2,320 kg (5,115 lb)
- Fuel capacity: 789.25 kg (1,740 lb)
- Powerplant: 1 × Williams FJ33-4A-19 turbofan, 8.5 kN (1,900 lbf) thrust

Performance

- Maximum speed: 583 km/h (362 mph, 315 kn)
- Cruise speed: 444 km/h (276 mph, 240 kn)
- Range: 2,500 km (1,600 mi, 1,300 nmi)
- Service ceiling: 7,600 m (24,900 ft)
- Rate of climb: 8.467 m/s (1,666.7 ft/min)
- Time to altitude: 7,620 m (25,000 ft) in 15 minutes

== See also ==
Aircraft of comparable role, configuration, and era

- Adam A700
- Cirrus Vision SF50
- Embraer Phenom 100
- Piper PA-47 PiperJet
