= Williams FJ33 =

Family of jet engines

FJ33
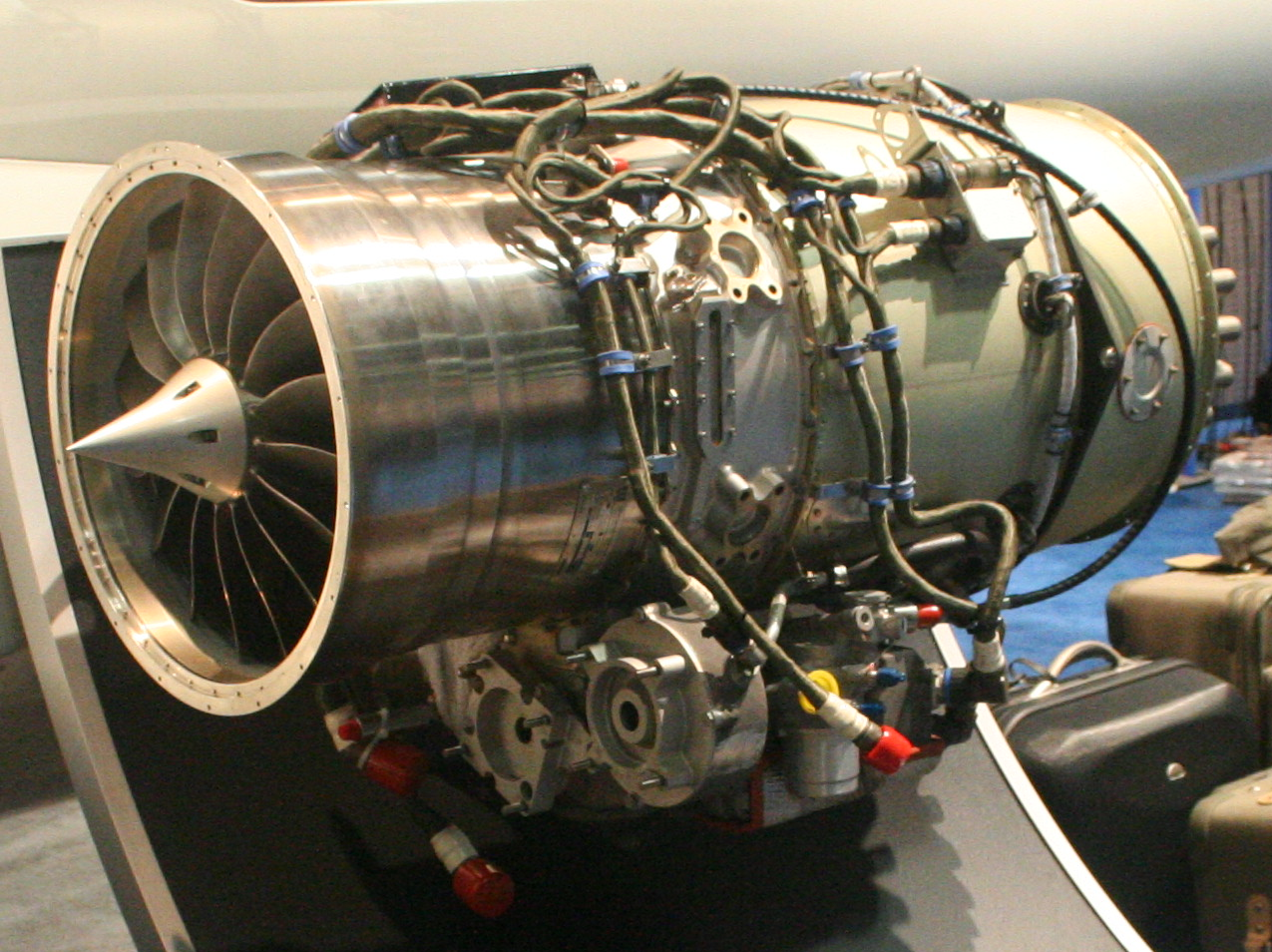
- Type: Turbofan
- National origin: United States
- Manufacturer: Williams International
- First run: 1998
- Major applications: Cirrus Vision SF50; Diamond D-Jet
- Developed from: Williams FJ44

The Williams FJ33 is an American family of turbofan jet engines intended for use in very light jet aircraft. The FJ33 is a scaled-down version of the FJ44 engine. The FJ33-5A is the latest version certified in June 2016.

== Design ==
Engine configuration is a single stage fan, with booster stage, driven by a two-stage LP turbine, supercharging a centrifugal HP compressor, driven by a single stage HP turbine. An annular combustor is featured.

The FJ33 has a dry weight of less than 300 lb (140 kg), overall diameter of 18.36 in (466 mm), 38.43 in (976 mm) overall length, and produces between 1,000 lbf (4,400 N) and 1,800 lbf (8,000 N) static thrust. Specific fuel consumption at 1,200 lbf (5,300 N) thrust (SLS, ISA) is understood to be 0.486 lb/(lbf⋅h) (13.8 g/(kN⋅s)).

== Variants ==
- FJ33-1
- FJ33-2
- FJ33-3
- FJ33-4-A11
- FJ33-4
- FJ33-4-17M
- FJ33-4-18M
- FJ33-4A-19
- FJ33-5A
- Jahesh-700

Iran apparently reverse engineered a variant, and is using it as high endurance UAV powerplant.

== Applications ==
- Adam A700
- ATG Javelin
- Cirrus Vision SF50
- Diamond D-Jet
- Epic Elite
- Flaris LAR01
- Kratos XQ-58 Valkyrie
- Spectrum S-33 Independence
- Sport Jet II
- Eclipse 700

== Specifications (FJ33-5A) ==
==== General characteristics ====
- Type: turbofan
- Length: 38.43 in (976 mm)
- Diameter: 18.36 in (466 mm),
- Dry weight: less than 300 lb (140 kg)

==== Components ====
- Compressor: 2 spool, 1-stage fan and 3-stage LP axial, 1 HP centrifugal
- Turbine: 2 spool, 1 HP and 2 LP

==== Performance ====
- Maximum thrust: 1,846 lb_{f} (8.21 kN)
- Specific fuel consumption: 0.486 lb/lbf/h (13.77 g/kN/s)
- Thrust-to-weight ratio: 6

== See also ==
Related development

- Williams EJ22
- Williams FJ44

Related lists

- List of aircraft engines
