= Williams FJ44 =

Small turbofan engine

FJ44
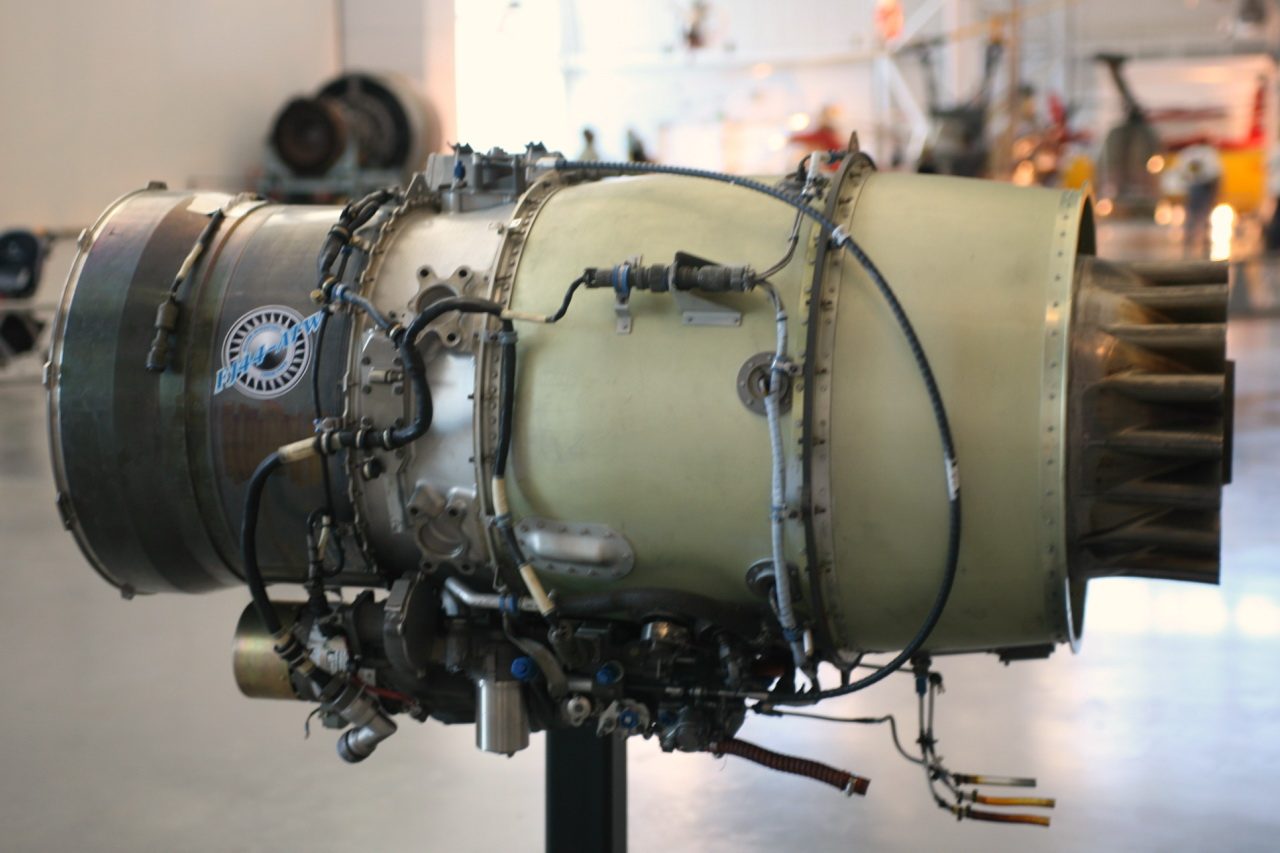
- A Williams FJ44-3ATW turbofan engine
- Type: Turbofan
- National origin: United States
- Manufacturer: Williams International
- First run: 1985
- Major applications: Beechcraft Premier I; Cessna CitationJet; Piper PiperJet Altaire; Saab 105; Grob G180 SPn; Pilatus PC-24
- Developed into: Williams FJ33

The Williams FJ44 is a family of small, two-spool, turbofan engines produced by Williams International for the light business jet market. Until the recent boom in the very light jet market, the FJ44 was one of the smallest turbofans available for civilian applications. Although a Williams design, Rolls-Royce was brought into the project at an early stage to design, develop, and manufacture an air-cooled high-pressure (HP) turbine for the engine. The FJ44 first flew on July 12, 1988 on the Scaled Composites/Beechcraft Triumph aircraft.

The Williams FJ33 is a newer, smaller engine based on the basic FJ44 design.

== Development ==
Production started in 1992 with the 1,900 lbf (8.5 kN) thrust FJ44-1A. The FJ44-1C is derated to 1,500 lbf (6.7 kN). The uprated to 2,300 lbf (10 kN) FJ44-2A was introduced in 1997. The 2,820 lbf (12.5 kN) thrust FJ44-3A was introduced in 2004. In 2005, a new low end version, the FJ44-1AP, was introduced, with a 1,965 lbf (8.74 kN) takeoff thrust. Released in 2007 was the new 3,600 lbf (16 kN) thrust FJ44-4. In 2010 this engine was in use on the Cessna CJ4, and since 2018 also on the new Pilatus PC-24.

== Design ==
The FJ44-1A has a single stage blisk fan plus a single intermediate pressure (IP) booster stage, both driven by a 2 stage low pressure (LP) turbine, and supercharging a single stage centrifugal high pressure (HP) compressor, driven by a single stage uncooled high pressure (HP) turbine. The combustor is an impingement cooled annular design. Fuel is delivered to the combustor through an unusual rotating fuel nozzle system, rather than the standard fuel-air mixers or vapourisers. The bypass duct runs the full length of the engine. The FJ44-2A has two additional booster compressor stages.

== Variants ==
FJ44-1A
1,900 lbf (8.5 kN) thrust, production started in 1992, 20.9 in (530 mm) diameter fan, SFC at full thrust at SLS, ISA is understood to be 0.456 lb/(hr lbf),
FJ44-1AP
1,965 lbf (8.74 kN) takeoff thrust, introduced in 2005, 5% better specific fuel consumption, lower internal temperatures, similar to the -1A with a higher pressure ratio fan, a new combustor and LP turbine, a new full length bypass duct/exhaust mixer and a dual channel FADEC.
FJ44-1C
1,500 lbf (6.7 kN) thrust, derated version of the FJ44-1A, SFC of 0.460 lb/lbf/h (46.9 kg/kN/h).
FJ44-2A
2,300 lbf (10 kN) thrust, introduced in 1997, larger 21.7 in (550 mm) diameter fan, with two additional booster stages to increase core flow, centrifugal compressor throttled-back aerodynamically to a lower HPC pressure ratio than the -1, exhaust mixer and a fuel electronic control unit.
FJ44-2C
2,400 lbf (11 kN) thrust, similar to the -2A with an integrated hydromechanical fuel control unit.
FJ44-3A
2,820 lbf (12.5 kN) thrust, 2004 introduction, similar to the -2A with a larger fan and dual channel FADEC unit.
FJ44-3A-24
2,490 lbf (11.1 kN) thrust, derated -3A.
FJ44-3AP
3,000 lbf (13 kN) thrust.
FJ44-4A
3,600 lbf (16 kN) thrust, released in 2007, hi-tech fan of larger diameter than the -3 unit. Used on the Cessna CJ4 and the Pilatus PC-24.
FJ44-4C
3,450 lbf (15.3kN) thrust. Used on the upcoming Honda HA-480 Echelon.
FJ44-4M
Williams-Rolls F129
Military designation for the derated FJ44-1C with 1,500 lbf (6.7 kN) thrust.

== Applications ==
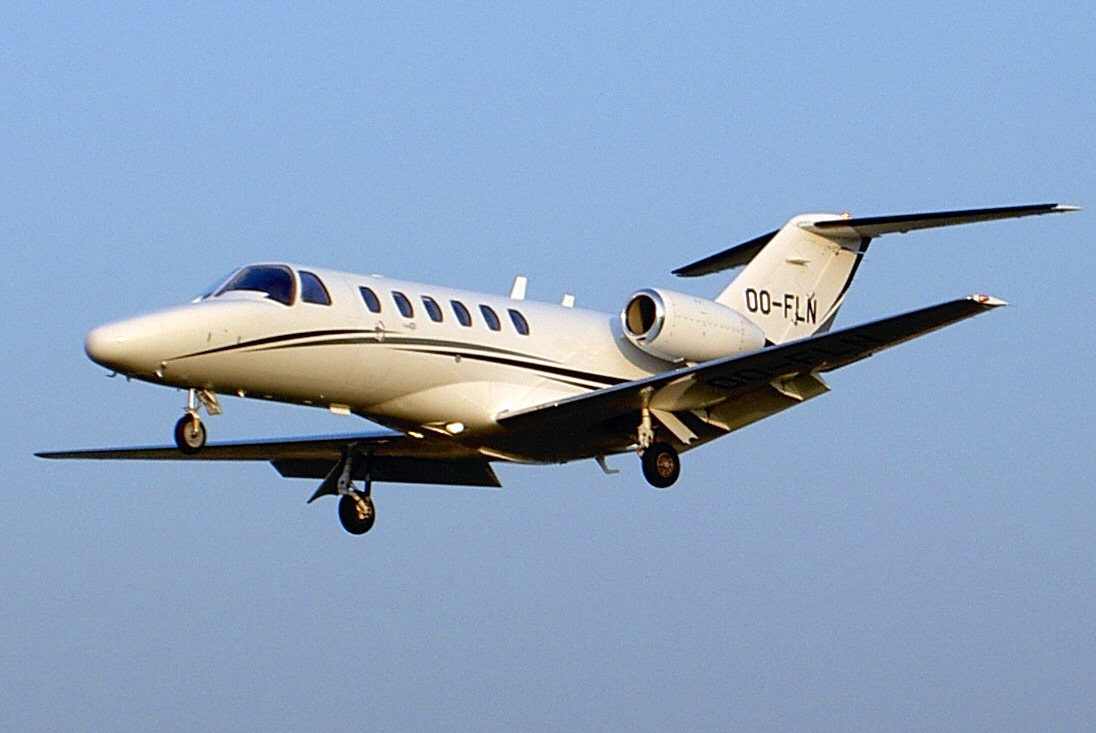
2,000 CitationJets have been delivered by June 2017

Australian Boeing MQ-28 Ghost Bat, a stealth, multirole, unmanned combat aerial fighter use Williams FJ44 engine

Variant	Application	Type	Deliveries
FJ44-1	Cessna CitationJet CJ1/CJ1+/M2	Business jet	1993-
FJ44-1	SAAB Sk60	Jet trainer	re-engine
FJ44-2	Beechcraft Premier 1A	Business jet	2001-2012
FJ44-2	Cessna CitationJet CJ2	Business jet	2000-2005
FJ44-2	Cessna Citation 501SP	Business jet	re-engine (Note: Sierra Industries FJ44 Stallion)
FJ44-2	Cessna Citation 550	Business jet	re-engine (Note: Sierra Industries FJ44 Eagle II)
FJ44-2	Scaled Composites Proteus	Experimental	1998
FJ44-2	Syberjet SJ30	Business jet	2007-2009
FJ44-2	Learjet 25	Business jet	re-engine (Note: SpiritWing)
FJ44-2	Virgin Atlantic GlobalFlyer	Experimental	2005
FJ44-3	Cessna CitationJet CJ2+/CJ3+	Business jet	2004-
FJ44-3	Cessna Citation 550	Business jet	re-engine (Note: Sierra Industries Super II/S-II)
FJ44-3	Nextant 400XTi	Business jet	re-engine
FJ44-4	Cessna CitationJet CJ4	Business jet	2010-
FJ44-4	Hawker 400XPR	Business jet	re-engine
FJ44-4	Pilatus PC-24	Business jet	2018-
FJ44-4	Boeing MQ-28 Ghost Bat	UCAV	2021-
FJ44-4M	Aero L-39 Skyfox	Jet trainer Light attack aircraft	2022-
FJ44-4M	Anduril YFQ-44	UCAV	2025-
FJ44-4M-34	Alenia Aermacchi M-345	Jet trainer	2018-
not delivered	Cessna 526 CitationJet (Note: as Williams-Rolls F129)	Jet trainer	2 prototypes
not delivered	Eviation Jets EV-20 Vantage Jet	Business jet	1 prototype
not delivered	Grob G180 SPn	Business jet	4 prototypes
not delivered	Hawker 200	Business jet	Cancelled
not delivered	Lockheed Martin Polecat	Drone	Crashed
not delivered	Lockheed Martin RQ-3 DarkStar	Drone	Cancelled
not delivered	Piper PA-47 PiperJet/Altaire	Business jet	1 prototype
not delivered	Scaled Composites Triumph	Business jet	1 prototype

== Specifications ==
Type Certificate Data Sheet
Variant	FJ44-1AP	FJ44-2	FJ44-3	FJ44-4
Configuration	Twin-spool turbofan with 1-stage fan and annular combustor			
LP compressor	1-stage axial	3-stage axial		
HP compressor	1-stage centrifugal			
Turbine	1-stage HP, 2-stage LP			
Thrust	1,900–2,100 lbf (8.5–9.3 kN)	2,300–2,400 lbf (10.2–10.7 kN)	3,000 lbf (13.3 kN)	3,600 lbf (16.0 kN)
Weight	460 lb (209 kg)	520–530 lb (236–240 kg)	516–535 lb (234–243 kg)	658 lb (298 kg)
T/W ratio	4.13–4.57	4.42–4.53	5.81–5.61	5.47
Length	41.4 in (105 cm)	47.2 in (120 cm)	48.0 in (122 cm)	52.8 in (134 cm)
Diameter	20.7 in (53 cm)	21.8 in (55 cm)	23.0 in (58 cm)	25.3 in (64 cm)

== See also ==
Related development

- Williams FJ33

Related lists

- List of aircraft engines
