= Diamond DART 280 =

DART 280

General information
- Type: four-seat light-single piston-engined helicopter
- National origin: Austria
- Manufacturer: Diamond Aircraft

The DART 280 is a four-seat light-single piston-engined helicopter concept by Austrian Diamond Aircraft.

== Development ==
Launched at the April 2017 AERO Friedrichshafen, its first flight was scheduled for October 2018 and certification a year later. Its development was later put on hold until it has a viable market.

== Design ==
Intended to compete with the Robinson R44, the composite aircraft will have a 280shp (208kW) four-stroke jet-fuel engine, energy absorbing retractable landing gear and a shrouded electric tail rotor. The 1,350 kg (2,980 lb) MTOW helicopter could haul a 556 kg (1,226 lb) payload, cruising at 145 kn (269 km/h) while burning 35 L (9.2 US gal) of fuel per hour.

== Specifications ==
Data from Flight Global April 2017

General characteristics

- Crew: Two
- Capacity: four
- Max takeoff weight: 1,350 kg (2,976 lb)
- Payload : 556 kg (1,226 lb)
- Powerplant: 1 × Safran SMA four-stroke jet-fuel engine, 210 kW (280 hp)

Performance

- Cruise speed: 269 km/h (167 mph, 145 kn)
- Fuel consumption: 35 L (9.2 US gal) per hour

== See also ==
Aircraft of comparable role, configuration, and era

- Robinson R44
