= Sport Jet II =

American homebuilt aircraft

General information
- Type: Amateur-built aircraft
- National origin: United States
- Manufacturer: Excel Jet; Sport-Jet, Limited
- Designer: Bob Bornhofen
- Status: Development ended (2015)
- Number built: 1

History
- First flight: May 12, 2006

The Sport Jet II was an American amateur-built aircraft that was under development by Sport-Jet, Limited. The Sport Jet was designed by Robert Bornhofen who licensed the intellectual property to Excel Jet. The aircraft was intended to be supplied as a kit for amateur construction. The first Sport Jet built crashed on takeoff after logging 23.8 hours of flight time.

== Design and development ==
The Sport Jet II featured a cantilever mid-wing, a four-seat enclosed and pressurized cabin, retractable tricycle landing gear, a T-tail and a single jet engine.

The aircraft fuselage was made from composites, with the wing fashioned from aluminum sheet. Its 34 ft (10.4 m) span employed a NACA 64-415 airfoil, had an area of 165 sq ft (15.3 m^{2}) and mounted flaps. The standard engine recommended was the 2,200 lb (998 kg) thrust Pratt & Whitney Canada JT15D turbofan, although when under development by Excel Jet a Williams FJ33 4A was used. The engine was mounted in the aft fuselage and was provided air by two intakes, one on each side of the fuselage.

The prototype aircraft's Federal Aviation Administration aircraft registration was cancelled on 4 June 2013. By May 2017 the company website had been blanked and it is likely that the project has been cancelled.

== Accident ==
On 22 June 2006 at 0953 hours local time, the Sport Jet prototype was destroyed in a crash just after take-off at Colorado Springs Municipal Airport (COS). According to reports, the plane lifted approximately fifteen feet into the air before rotating left to 90° of bank, at which point the left wing contacted the ground, causing the plane to cartwheel off the runway before coming to rest 454 feet from the initial point of impact. The National Transportation Safety Board (NTSB) investigation concluded it could find no cause for the accident, focusing mostly on disproving the pilot and owner's assertions that the crash was caused by wake turbulence. The NTSB used NASA's APA program to compute the location and strength of the wake turbulence the previous plane (a de Havilland Dash-8-200) would have left behind, and found there was no contributing wake involved in the crash.

Excel-Jet filed a lawsuit against the FAA stating that the crash was a direct result of the wake turbulence from the DHC-8, and that the NTSB findings were incorrect. Bornhofen believed the FAA air traffic control clearance of the Sport-Jet for take-off was in violation of the FAA's regulations "and caused it to crash", according to lawyer Frank Coppola. At the conclusion of the case, US District Judge Kathryn H. Vratil found that "in electing not to apply the three-minute separation interval, [the air traffic controller] did not breach her duty of care or violate FAA orders. Furthermore, even if a breach occurred, a wake turbulence encounter did not cause the accident. Therefore the Court finds in favor of the United States of America." A judgment was entered in favor of the defendant and the case was closed on 17 June 2010.

== Specifications (Sport Jet II) ==
Data from Bayerl and Sport-Jet, Limited

General characteristics

- Crew: one
- Capacity: four-five passengers
- Length: 30 ft (9.1 m)
- Wingspan: 34 ft (10 m)
- Height: 9.6 ft (2.9 m)
- Wing area: 165 sq ft (15.3 m^{2})
- Airfoil: NACA 64-415
- Empty weight: 2,900 lb (1,315 kg)
- Gross weight: 5,250 lb (2,381 kg)
- Fuel capacity: 220 U.S. gallons (830 L; 180 imp gal)
- Powerplant: 1 × Pratt & Whitney Canada JT15D turbofan, 2,200 lbf (9.8 kN) thrust

Performance

- Maximum speed: 420 kn (480 mph, 780 km/h)
- Cruise speed: 380 kn (440 mph, 700 km/h)
- Stall speed: 67 kn (77 mph, 124 km/h)
- Range: 1,200 nmi (1,400 mi, 2,300 km)
- Service ceiling: 28,000 ft (8,500 m)
- Rate of climb: 3,000 ft/min (15 m/s)
- Wing loading: 30 lb/sq ft (150 kg/m^{2})
