= Grob G180 SPn =

Type of aircraft

G180 SP^{n}
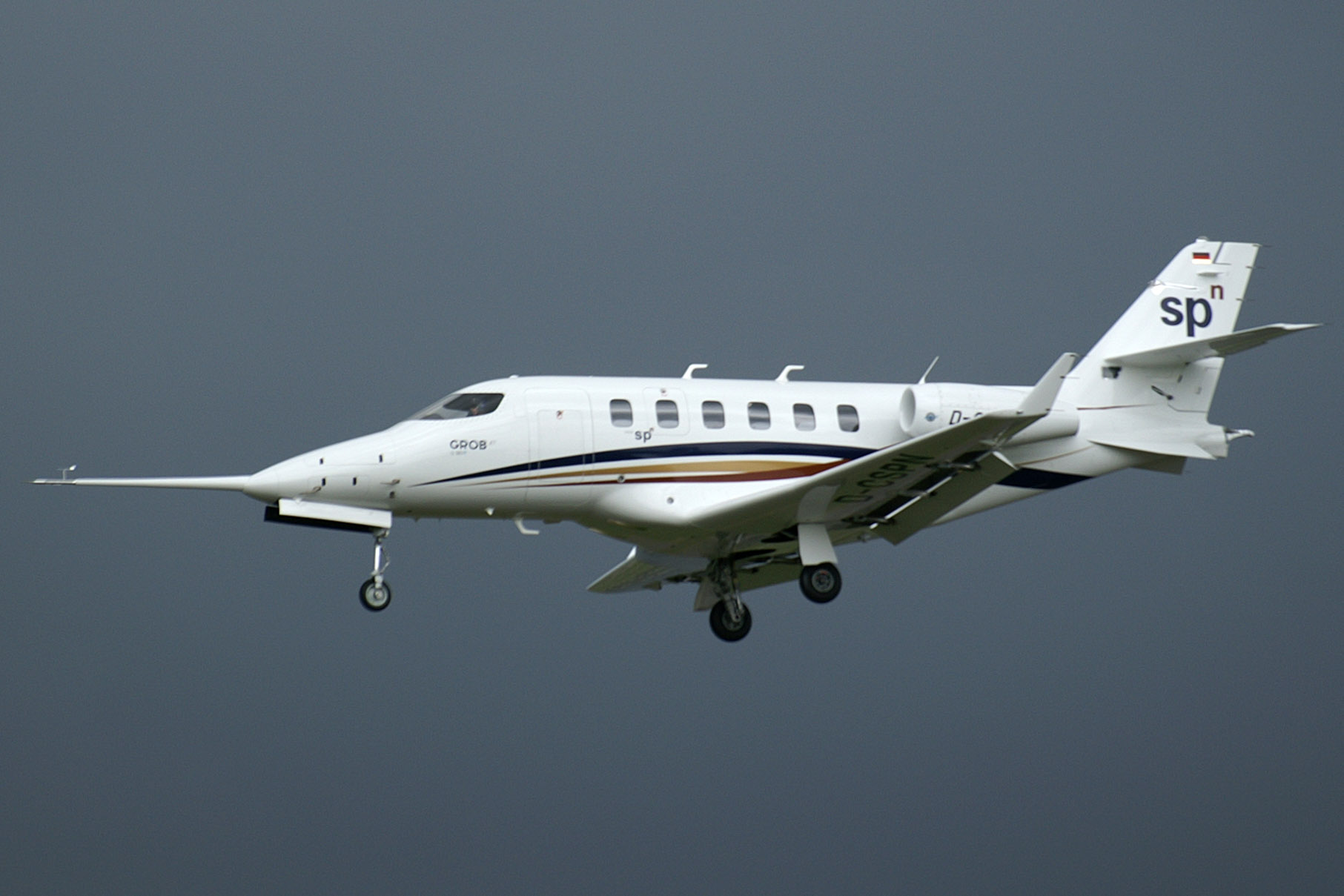
- Grob G180 SP^{n} at ILA 2006

General information
- Type: Corporate jet
- National origin: Germany
- Manufacturer: Grob Aircraft Tata Advanced Systems Limited
- Status: Operative
- Number built: 4

History
- Introduction date: 2006
- First flight: 20 July 2005

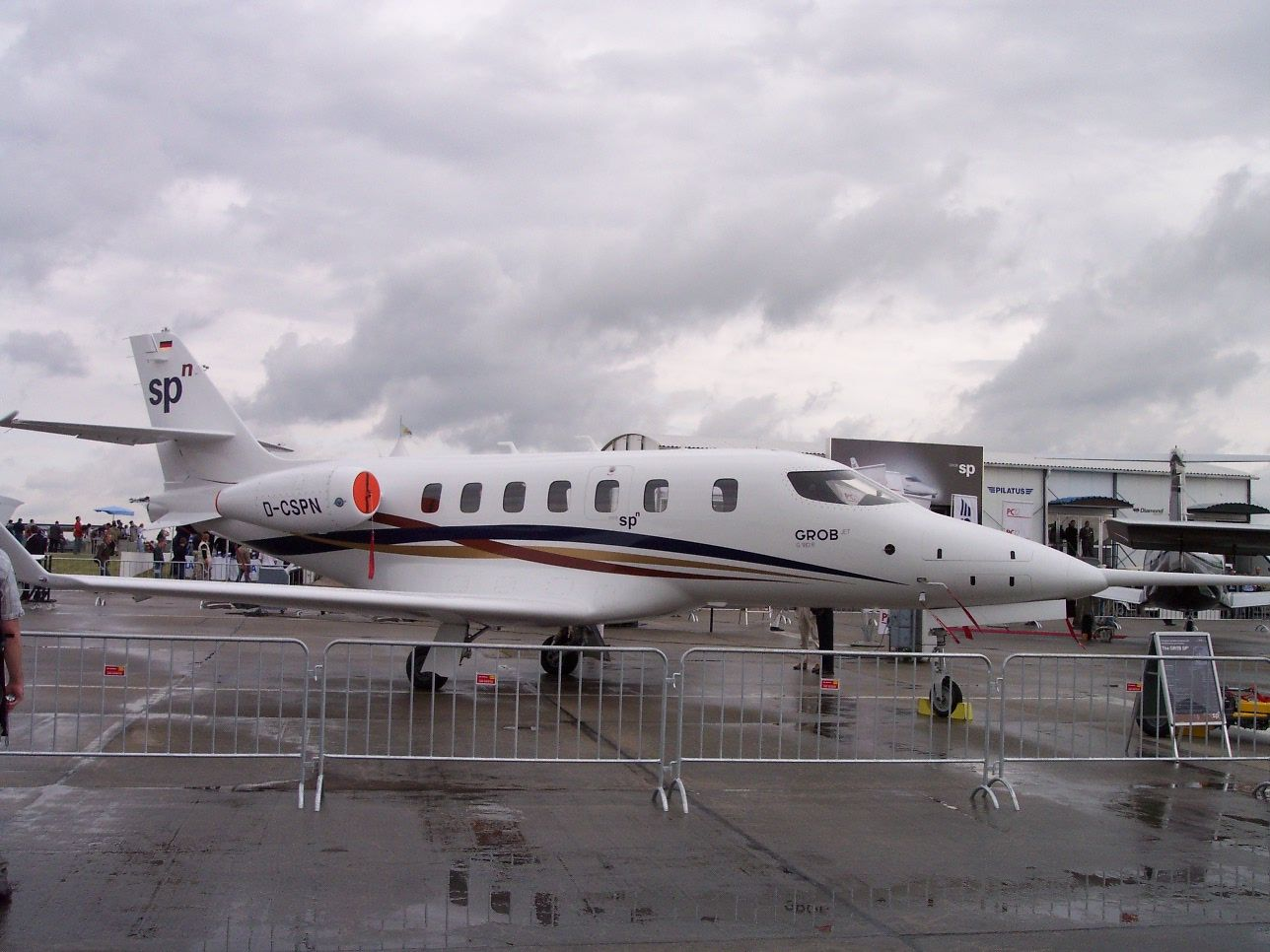
Grob G180 SP^{n} at ILA 2006

The Grob G180 SP^{n} is a low-wing twin-engined composite corporate jet designed and built by German aircraft manufacturer Grob Aerospace. Development was suspended during 2008 in response to Grob's insolvency; since then, multiple efforts have been made to re-launch the programme. Tata Advanced Systems Limited (TASL) has bought the Intellectual Property rights of the aircraft and will manufacture it in India.

== Design and development ==
By the turn of the century, German aircraft manufacturer Grob Aerospace had established itself as a producer of motor gliders and trainer aircraft. However, during the mid-2000s, the company decided to embark on designing a jet-powered light aircraft; development work was carried out in relative secrecy at Grob's Tussenhausen-Mattsies facility. In response to perceived market demand, this aircraft would possess both the short-field and cargo-carrying performance traditionally associated with turboprop-powered aircraft, as well as the extensive use of composite materials. The requirements of the aircraft were defined in close collaboration with the Swiss-based company ExecuJet Aviation Group. Grob Aerospace president Dr Andreas Plesske stated of the design: "We have created a new category of jet aircraft".

It was initially referred to as the 'SPn Utility Jet. In a standard layout, the cabin seated a maximum of eight passengers; a typical cabin configuration would have included a forward toilet and a basic galley. The cabin, which had a volume of 11.5m3 (405ft3) and headroom of 1.64m, could be converted within an hour from a passenger to cargo configuration or vice versa, as well as accommodating a combi configuration that shared the space between passengers and cargo. Both the wings and fuselage were composed of a rugged carbon fibre reinforced plastic (CFRP) composite, which were combined with a highly-reinforced undercarriage. This undercarriage was equipped with anti-lock brakes, large wheels and low-pressure tyres, aimed at making the aircraft capable of hassle-free routine operations from austere and unimproved landing strips. The aircraft was powered by a pair of Williams FJ44-3A turbofan engines, capable of generating up to of 2,800lb (12kN) of thrust; the cockpit was furnished with Honeywell's APEX integrated avionics suite, comprising a pair of 15in (0.4m) primary flight displays and two 10in multi-function displays. The avionics were designed to accept various optional items, including an enhanced vision system, auto-throttle, emergency descent mode and an electronic flight bag.

During May 2005, the first prototype was completed; the first handful of sales were secured within the following weeks. During June 2005, the programme's existence was publicly revealed. On 20 July 2005, the first prototype performed its maiden flight, flown by chief test pilot Gérard Guillaumaud, who later commented that: "During the flight, all systems and controls performed as expected...The aircraft was easy to handle and was a pleasure to fly". By this point, ExecuJet Aviation Group has been appointed the exclusive worldwide sales distributor and maintenance support partner for the aircraft; Execujet stated it had forecast sales of roughly 400 aircraft over the next 10 years within the utility business jet market, for which the SPn was viewed as the sole option available. During May 2006, a six-seat VIP cabin configuration was revealed for the type. During November 2006, Grob stated that it had received significant interest in the development of a stretched variant of the aircraft being produced, including for surveillance purposes as a cost-effective alternative to the Northrop Grumman RQ-4 Global Hawk unmanned aerial vehicle. Plans for a family of aircraft based on the type were mooted.

On 29 November 2006, the second prototype was destroyed by a crash that resulted in the death of chief test pilot Gérard Guillaumaud; it had been performing a demonstration flight at the time of the accident. A subsequent investigation determined the primary cause of the accident was due to flutter in the elevators and tailplane. Despite the accident, work continued on the production of a third prototype. The crash impacted the company's certification timetable, which called for European Aviation Safety Agency (EASA) type certification to be achieved during the first quarter of 2007. During February 2007, following a three month break, flight testing resumed using the third prototype; by this point, certification was targeted for early 2008.

During November 2008, development of the G180 was put on hold by the insolvency of Grob Aerospace. The company's finances had been badly affected by the withdrawal of a major investor in the venture, aggravated by delays to the programme. While subsequent attempts had been made to raise investment amid the Great Recession, these had been unsuccessful. While Grob's existing product range became the property of the newly-formed Grob Aircraft, the G180 programme fell under the ownership of the company's largest creditor. Prior to the company's collapse, around 100 orders had been secured for the G180, which had a list price of €5.9 million ($8.7 million).

The rights to the aircraft were acquired by Allied Aviation Technologies as a result of Grob's insolvency. During March 2009, it was announced that the programme was intended to be reactivated. During September 2010, DAHER subsidiary SOCATA announced that it would be evaluating the G180 SP^{n} during the next few months, and was considering the programme's acquisition from Allied Aviation Technologies. However, during 2012, DAHER-SOCATA stated that, following its year-long evaluation of the aircraft, it had identified several shortcomings and would not be participating in its development; the company stated that it would prefer to pursue its own clean-sheet twin-engine design instead. After several years of quiet, reports emerged of a potential revival around 2015, some claiming that the recent success of the Pilatus PC-24 had stimulated such interest.

In late 2020 it was reported that Tata Advanced Systems of India had likely bought the intellectual property rights of the aircraft for the development of a military variant to be offered to the Indian army as a signals intelligence gathering and surveillance platform.

== Specifications ==
Data from Flug-Revue

General characteristics

- Crew: 1 pilot
- Capacity: 9 passengers
- Length: 14.81 m (48 ft 7 in)
- Wingspan: 14.86 m (48 ft 9 in)
- Height: 5.12 m (16 ft 9.5 in)
- Gross weight: 6,300 kg (13,889 lb)
- Powerplant: 2 × Williams FJ44-3A turbofans , 12.44 kN (2,800 lbf) thrust each

Performance

- Maximum speed: 753 km/h (468 mph, 407 kn)
- Maximum speed: Mach 0.70
- Stall speed: 143 km/h (89 mph, 77 kn)
- Range: 3,425 km (2,128 mi, 1,849 nmi)
- Service ceiling: 12,500 m (41,000 ft)
- Rate of climb: 22 m/s (4,360 ft/min)

== See also ==
Aircraft of comparable role, configuration, and era

- Learjet 40
- Learjet 70
- Cessna CitationJet
- Embraer Phenom 300
- Emivest SJ30
- Hawker 400
- Pilatus PC-24
- Spectrum S-40 Freedom
