= Gérard Guillaumaud =

French test pilot (1961–2006)

- Born: Paris, France
- Died: Tussenhausen, Bavaria, Germany
- Cause of death: Aviation accident

Gérard Guillaumaud (May 17, 1961 – November 29, 2006) was a French Air Force test pilot.

== Career ==
Guillaumaud was born in Paris, France and was a graduate of the National Test Pilot School (NTPS) in Mojave, California.

He holds a number of world records in aviation according to the Fédération Aéronautique Internationale (FAI). On 16 August 2004 he completed a non-stop crossing of the north Atlantic in a Diamond DA42 Twin Star, a first for a diesel-powered general aviation aircraft.

Guillaumaud flew the maiden flight of several aircraft in his career including:

- the HPA TT62 Alekto on 22 February 2005,
- the Grob G180 SPn on 20 July 2005,
- and the Diamond D-Jet on 18 April 2006.

== Accident and death ==
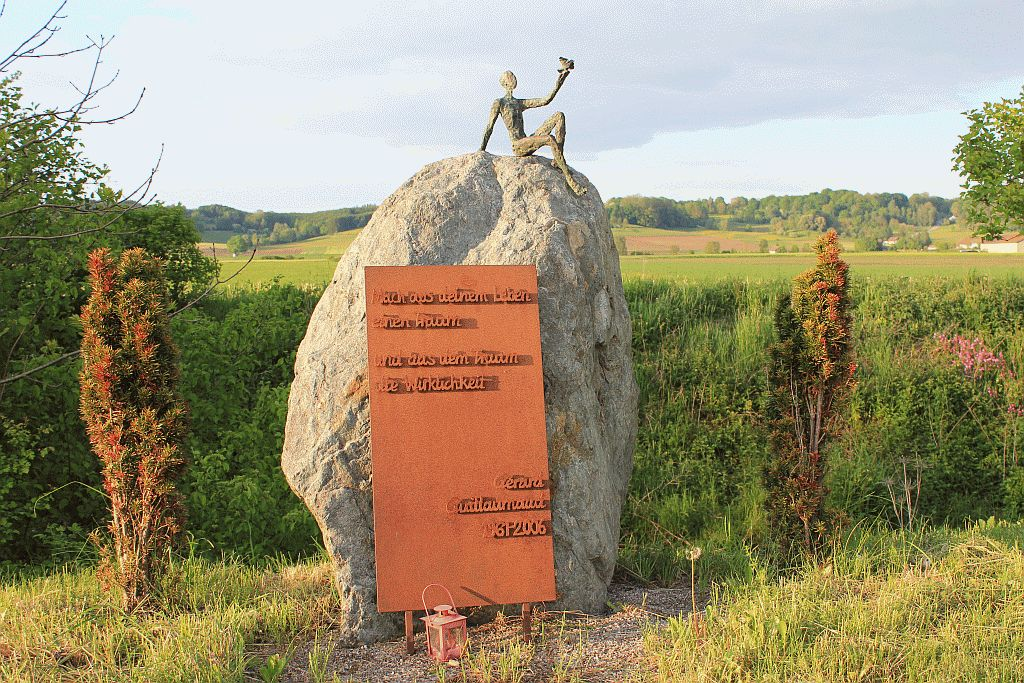
Memorial site in Mattsies reading "Make of your life a dream and of a dream a reality” in German.

Guillaumaud was piloting a demonstration flight aboard the second Grob G180 SPn test aircraft (Aircraft registration: D-CGSP) on 29 November 2006. When he was approaching the Mindelheim-Mattsies airport in Germany, both elevators and the left horizontal stabilizer separated from the aircraft. The G180 hit the ground and Guillaumaud died in the impact.

The European Flight Test Safety Award was established by his fiancée Heidi Biermeier to honour him and his life’s work.
