= Diamond Aircraft Industries =

Aircraft manufacturer located in Austria

Diamond Aircraft Industries GmbH
- Formerly: Hoffmann Flugzeugbau (1981–1985); Hoffman Aircraft Limited (1985–1992); Dimona Aircraft (1992–1996)
- Type: GmbH
- Industry: Aerospace manufacturer
- Predecessor: HOAC
- Founded: 1981; 45 years ago in Friesach, Carinthia, Austria
- Founder: Wolf Hoffmann
- Headquarters: Wiener Neustadt, Lower Austria, Austria
- Key people: Bin Chen (Chairman); Frank Zhang (CEO, Austria division); Kevin Sheng (CEO, Canada division); Joyce Li (CEO, China division); Luca Giaquinta (CEO, Germany division)
- Products: Light aircraft Simulators
- Number of employees: 1,300+ (2023)
- Parent: Wanfeng Aviation
- Website: www.diamondaircraft.com

Diamond Aircraft Industries is a manufacturer of general aviation aircraft and motor gliders, based in Wiener Neustadt, Lower Austria, Austria. It has been a subsidiary of the Chinese company Wanfeng Aviation since 2017. It is the third largest manufacturer of aircraft for the general aviation sector, and has operational facilities in both Lower Austria and Ontario, Canada, as well as further production lines operated as joint ventures in other nations, such as China.

The company was founded by Austrian aircraft designer Wolf Hoffmann in 1981, at which point it was known as Hoffmann Flugzeugbau. Its first aircraft, a motor glider initially known as the HK36 Dimona, became a commercial success and led to improved models and further types of aircraft derived from it. Following several changes in ownership and naming, the company received the name Diamond Aircraft Industries in 1998. By this point, Diamond was producing a range of light aircraft, including the Dimona, the Diamond DA20, and the in-development Diamond DA40.

In 2004, Diamond introduced its first multi-engined aircraft, the Diamond DA42 Twin Star. Demand from government operators led to the development of the Aeronautics Defense Dominator, a medium-altitude long-endurance (MALE) unmanned aerial vehicle (UAV) used for aerial surveillance. For several years, the company was developing a single-engined very light jet, the Diamond D-Jet, intended for both private and military customers. However, due to the Great Recession, development of the jet slowed and was ultimately discontinued in 2013.

== History ==
=== 1980s ===
In 1981, a new company, Hoffmann Flugzeugbau, was founded by aircraft designer Wolf Hoffmann in Friesach, Carinthia, Austria; it was formed with the ambition of becoming a major aircraft manufacturer for general aviation purposes. According to Michael Feinig, a future managing director of the company, the firm's leadership had recognised that there was a market for a range of modern light aircraft, and that the general aviation sector had been then dominated by mostly old designs from established manufacturers. By taking advantage of innovations in avionics and manufacturing technologies, the market could be entered by a capable competitor.

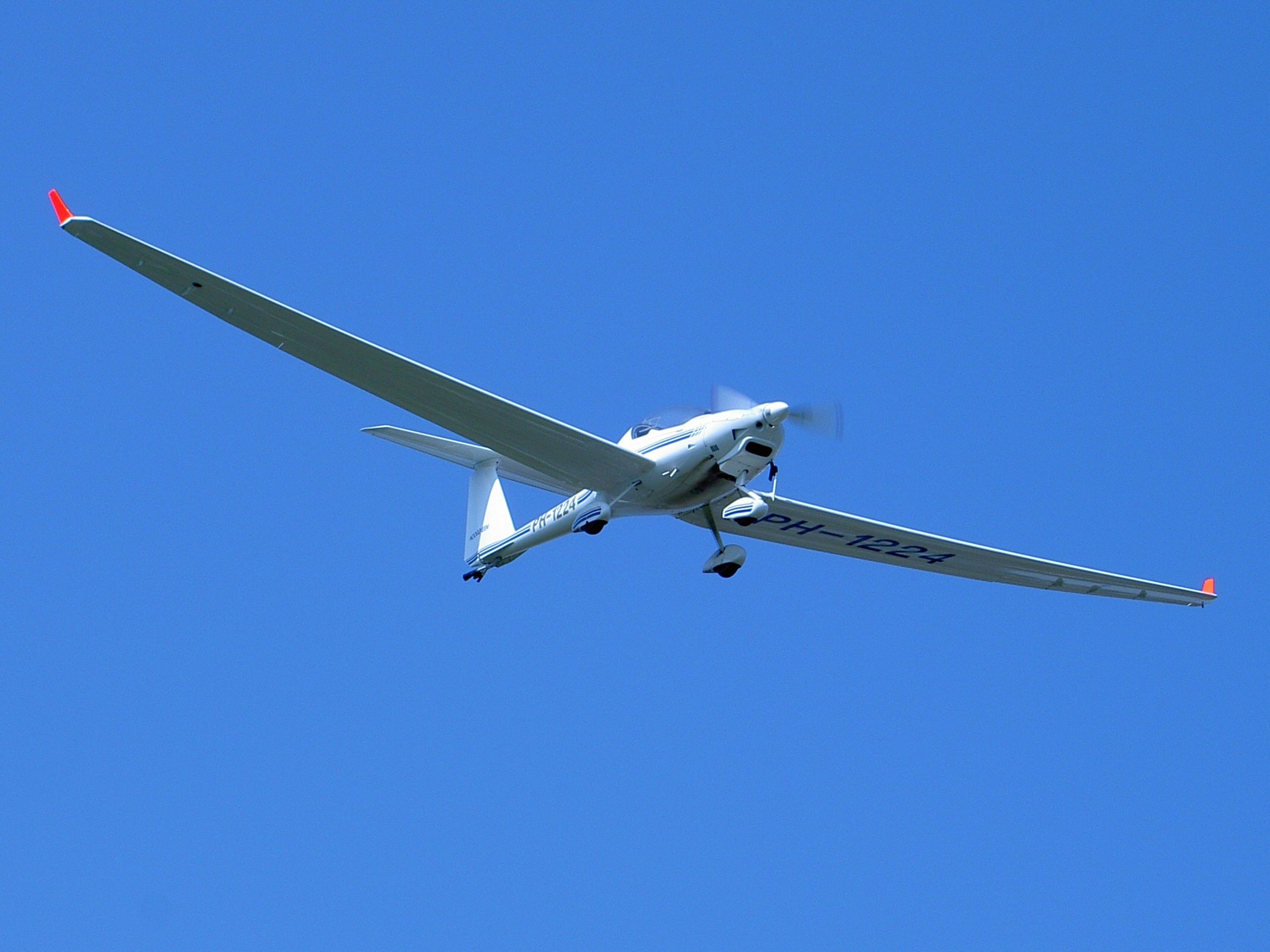
Diamond HK36 Super Dimona, a low-wing two-seat motor glider and the company's first production aircraft

Hoffmann Flugzeugbau quickly set about the development of a suitable aircraft to launch its product range with. Accordingly, during the early 1980s, the company launched production of a two-seat all-composite motor glider, initially known as the H36 Dimona. The H36 demonstrated the company's ambition to raise both the quality and performance of such aircraft while making them available at competitive prices. The type was relatively successful, becoming the biggest-selling motor glider in Europe and, by 2004, four separate versions of the Dimona - which were marketed as the HK36 Super Dimona or Xtreme - were available for purchase.

In 1985, the company was renamed Hoffman Aircraft Limited and became a subsidiary of Simmering-Graz-Pauker AG, which resulted in the company's headquarters being relocated to Vienna. During 1987, the company reestablished its main production facility in Wiener Neustadt, Lower Austria. During the late 1980s, amid the various corporate changes in both identity and ownership, the company's management had proceeded with its work towards the goal of rapidly expanding Hoffman's product range.

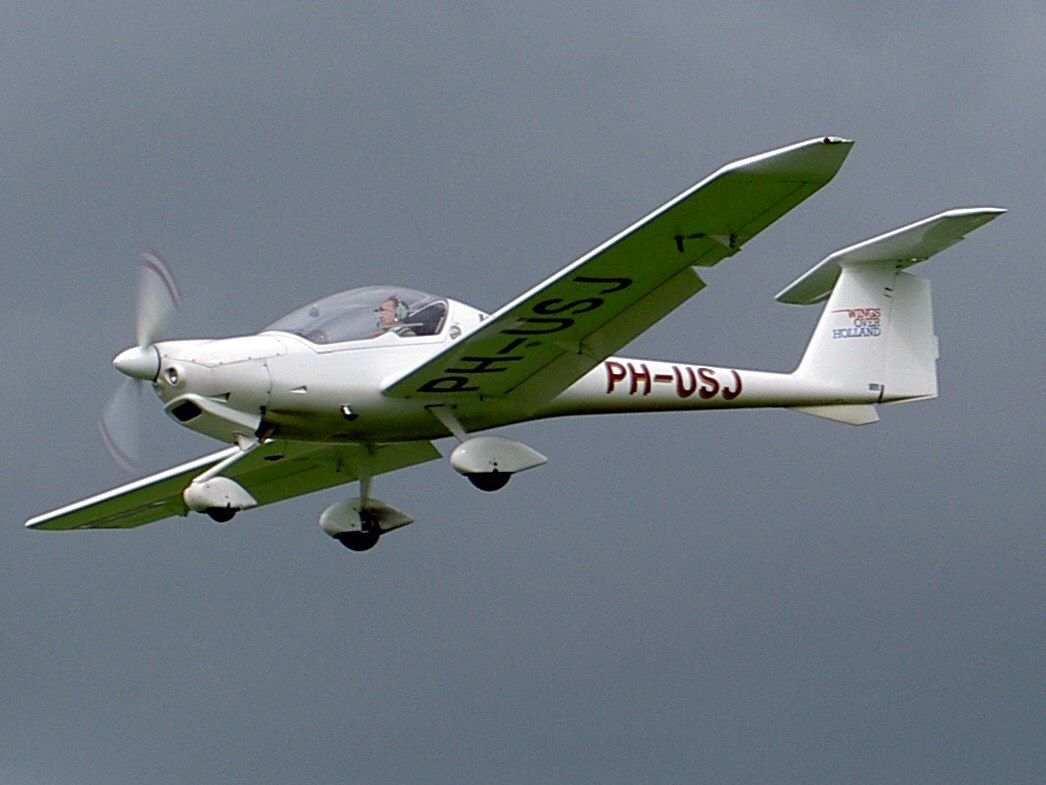
Diamond DA20 Katana, a two-seat general aviation light aircraft

In line with this mission statement, it had been decided to develop a new two-seat aircraft, the HK36R, which used the H36 Dimona as a basis. This would result in the production of the DV20 Katana, a Rotax 912-powered two-place light aircraft, which was the company's first production general aviation aircraft.

=== 1990s ===
During 1991, Hoffman's parent company was renamed HOAC AG and was purchased by the Dries Family.

In 1992, as a measure to establish a strong foothold with the competitive North American market, owner Christian Dries decided to launch a second manufacturing facility located in London, Ontario, Canada. By this point, the company considered itself to be secure in its dominance of the European market, and sought to be embraced by American operators as well. Prior to 1996, the Canadian branch operated under the name Dimona Aircraft, this was changed to Diamond Aircraft in 1996, while the parent company remained as HOAC at this time.

In 1993, the Austrian-built DV20 Katana received certification, clearing the type for its entry to service. According to aerospace publication Flight International, the DV20 "confirmed Diamond as a serious contender for the light aircraft crown".

An improved model of the DV20, designated as the DA20, was developed for North America and was manufactured in Canada; the first Canadian-built DA20 was delivered in 1995. It received the Flight magazine's Eagle Award for best light aircraft in the same year. During 1997, the delivery of the 500th DV20 occurred; it was also in this year that the introduction of the DA20-C1 took place, which had improved performance and load capabilities. The DA20-C1 Eclipse (an improved version of the DA20-C1) also entered production.

In 1998, the parent company was renamed Diamond Aircraft GmbH to better align with the naming convention of the North American operation. The company also purchased the Wiener Neustadt East Airport in that same year. The firm continued to work on multiple new aircraft types in order to further grow its product line; these were developed in line with a company-wide philosophy of seeking to offer aircraft that lacked any equivalent in terms of performance to any existing major product being produced from any of its competing manufacturers; this was a measure to consciously avoid instances of direct head-to-head competition.

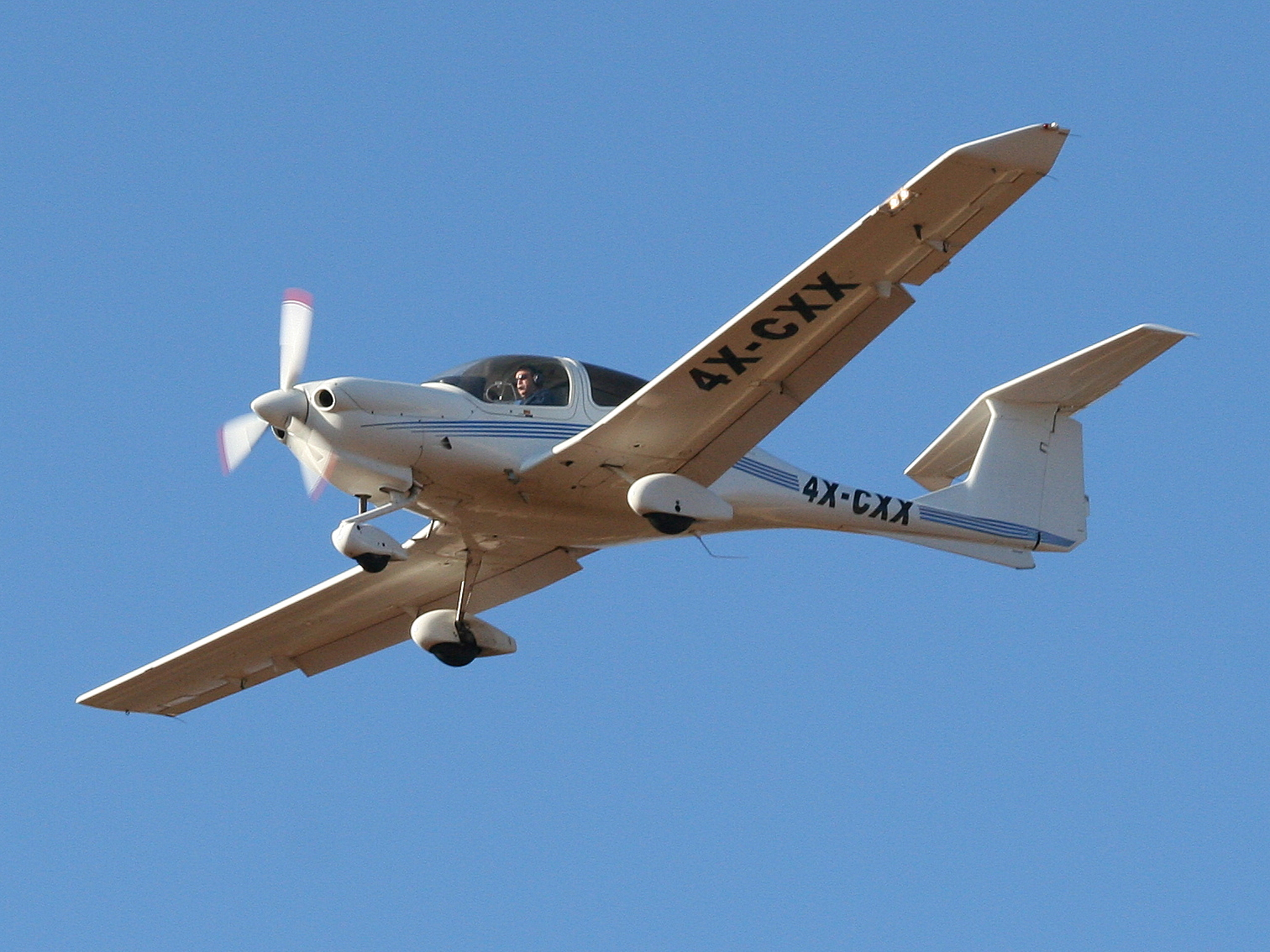
The Diamond DA40 four-seater is available with a petrol or diesel engine

In 1997, the Diamond DA40 a four-place IFR aircraft, received certification; it was followed by the twin diesel engine DA42 in 2004. According to Flight International, the DA40 was capable of outperforming many similar aircraft which at that time had carried substantially greater purchase costs than the DA40 outfitted with a basic configuration. When launched in 2001, the DA40TDI was the first production aircraft powered by a single diesel-based piston engine.

=== 2000s ===
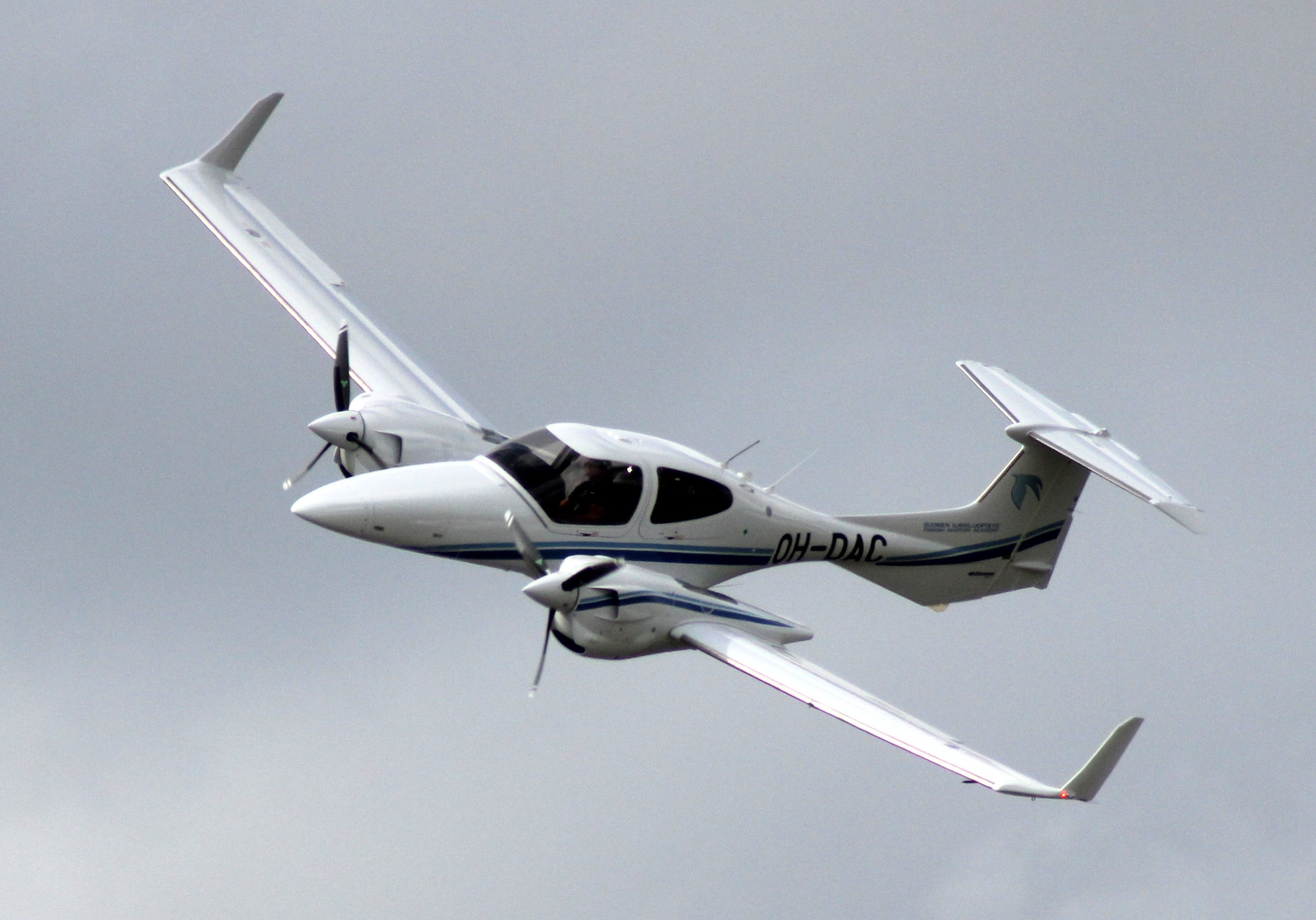
Diamond DA42 TwinStar, a four-seat twin-diesel

In 2002, a new programme to develop an aircraft equipped with twin diesel engines, the Diamond DA42 Twin Star, was launched. During May 2004, the DA42 received certification. Even prior to its introduction to service, a heavy order book for the DA42 had already been accumulated, and plans had been mooted for the development of a dedicated unmanned air vehicle (UAV) platform based upon the type. This would be introduced as the Aeronautics Defense Dominator, a medium-altitude long-endurance (MALE) unmanned aerial vehicle (UAV) which was used for aerial surveillance duties.

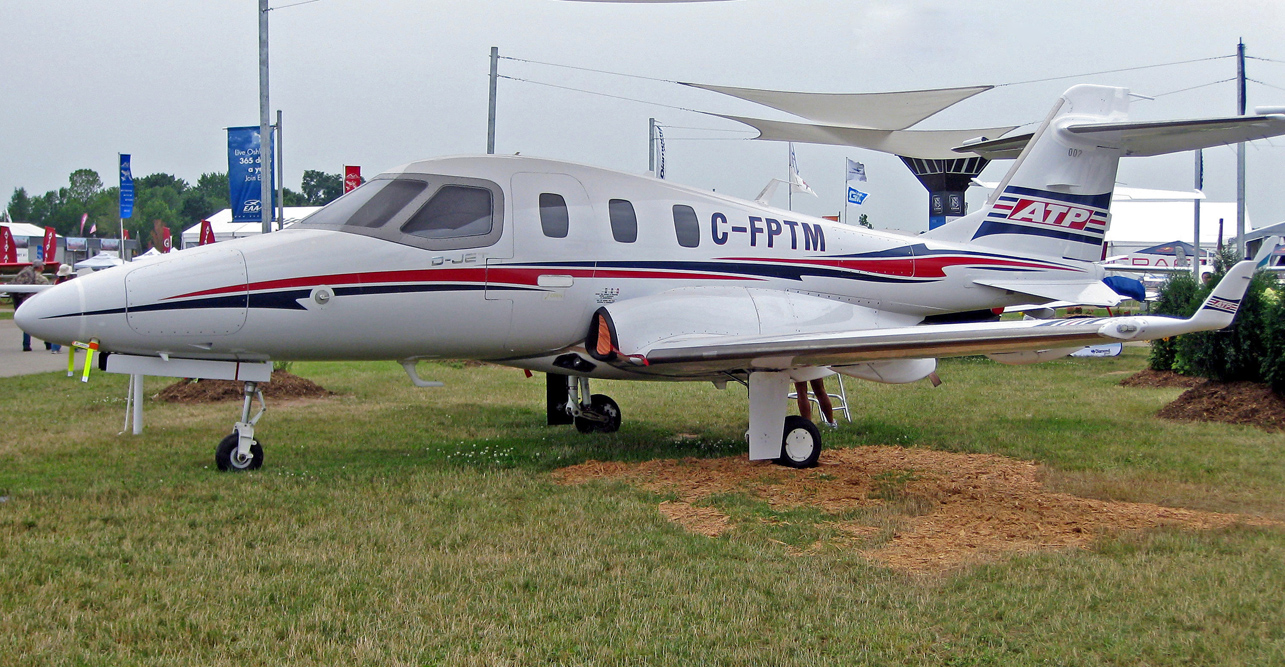
Diamond D-Jet, a five-seat single engine very light jet, development was suspended

In 2003, Diamond announced the launch of its light jet program, known as the Diamond D-Jet. This five-seat single engine jet aircraft was marketed towards the emergent very light jet market, and was considered to be a major diversification for the company. Nonetheless, Feinig was confident on the prospective demand for the type, forecasting that around 15 per cent of demand for the D-Jet would come from existing Diamond customers. Development of the D-Jet, unlike the majority of the company's programs, would be protracted as a result of numerous factors, of both a technical and fiscal nature.

Speaking in 2004, Feinig stated of the company's ambition "Our vision is to be number one manufacturer of propeller-driven single and twins... and we aim to hold that position within five years". During 2001, aircraft deliveries totalled 176; during 2003, deliveries had risen to 263. In 2004, deliveries were forecast to climb as high as 850 aircraft per year in 2008. In 2005, the company announced the establishment of a joint venture that sought to produce the DA-40 light aircraft in China.

In 2004, the company opened its new 9,300 m^{2} (100,000 sq ft) composites facility in Austria; it housed production of wings and fuselages for the DA42 and the in-development D-Jet, and supported Diamond's ambitions to boost annual production capacity to 600 aircraft, around half of which will be shipped to Canada for final assembly. Also during 2004, a new supply-orientated subsidiary, named Diamond Aircraft Croatia, was established to perform the manufacture of labour-intensive composite parts in a new purpose-built factory in Varaždin, Croatia.

In December 2008, due to the 2008 financial crisis, the company laid off 100 workers from its Austrian facility in Wiener Neustadt. At that time, the facility employed 700 of the company's 2,100 worldwide workforce. The wider market for general aircraft had plummeted as an impact of the Great Recession; the gradual recovery from this event would take many years and would not be without consequence on several of Diamond's existing production lines and development programmes.

=== 2010s ===
In March 2011, the president and CEO of Diamond Aircraft Canada, Peter Maurer, indicated that his company's future was in doubt and relied on getting the D-Jet to market, as piston sales remained slow since the start of the Great Recession in 2007. To get the D-Jet into production the company found $20 million in private investment, plus the commitment of an additional $35 million from the Government of Ontario. The Ontario government investment was contingent on Diamond also securing an additional $35 million from the Government of Canada. If both federal and provincial loans were provided then, combined with funds already provided, the total provincial and federal government investment would have been $100 million. Maurer indicated "If we don’t get the funding from the federal government, it puts us in a difficult situation. If the D-JET, for example, in a worse [sic] case scenario, were not to continue it would have a negative impact on the rest of the company’s operations. [The debts are] at a level that would be very difficult to satisfy out of piston sales," he said. "I’ll let you do the extrapolation."

By the end of March 2011, with a federal election in full swing and no sign of the requested federal government loans coming, the company laid-off 213 London-based employees, mostly on the D-Jet program. Company CEO Peter Maurer stated, "We are hopeful that the government will give this matter urgent attention and provide the requested assistance". During April, Diamond indicated that it needed C$8M from the federal government over the next four months as an interim measure. Local Conservative Party of Canada Member of Parliament Ed Holder stated that Diamond owner Christian Dries had told him that he would close the London plant and announce the closure just before the federal election if support was not forthcoming. Dries issued a denial of the conversation, but Holder insisted that was correct and suggested that Diamond look to the province or the city for the money instead.

Following the 2 May 2011 federal election, which returned a majority Conservative government, Industry Minister Tony Clement announced that the government had rejected Diamond's loan request. Clement stated "We are stewards of taxpayers dollars and we have risked, quite rightly, $20 million in taxpayer dollars to date, and it is not judicious to up that by another $35 million. We hope the company Diamond continues to be part of the scene in London. We do not wish for its demise." Maurer indicated that the company was still working on private investment options but that would take more time and that in the meantime they were continuing to lose their laid-off staff. He also stated, "We have been very clear that without this loan, the D-Jet program is at risk here in London. Diamond’s future is at risk here." Maurer indicated that when upcoming loan repayments are due that the company cannot meet those obligations out of propeller aircraft sales and without an infusion of capital cannot get the D-Jet to market.

On 13 November 2011, Diamond announced that a majority share of Diamond Aircraft Holdings, Canada, the Canadian operating arm of the company, had been sold to Medrar Financial Group, an investment company based in Dubai, United Arab Emirates for an undisclosed amount. The move was intended to provide continued production of the company's piston-engine line and also allow development of the D-Jet project to continue. The announcement of the investment, along with gradually improving economic conditions, seemed to increase customer confidence as the company registered a 33% increase in sales in 2011 over the previous year. Diamond delivered 185 aircraft in 2011, compared to 139 in 2010.

However, the sale to Medrar was never completed as a result of the firm failed to come up with the agreed money. Diamond continued operations, using funding from its own shareholders. In late February 2013, having not located further operational funding, the company laid off the majority of its Canadian staff and ceased work on the D-Jet program, indicating that the company needed to reorganize. Staff working on completing aircraft orders and parts support were retained. By mid-2014, some staff had returned to work.

In March 2012, company CEO Christian Dries indicated that the market focus of the company had been changed by the recession of 2008-10 and that the company was deriving two-thirds of its revenue from military and government contracts, primarily for manned and unmanned surveillance versions of its DA42. In April 2012, the company announced the Diamond Hero, an autonomous operation helicopter unmanned aerial vehicle.

On 13 December 2016 Diamond sold a 60% share of its Diamond Aircraft Canada operation to the Wanfeng Aviation, part of Chinese conglomerate Wanfeng Auto Holding Group. Diamond Aircraft characterized the sale as a "strategic reinvestment" and indicated that the move would allow a re-assessment of the suspended D-Jet program.

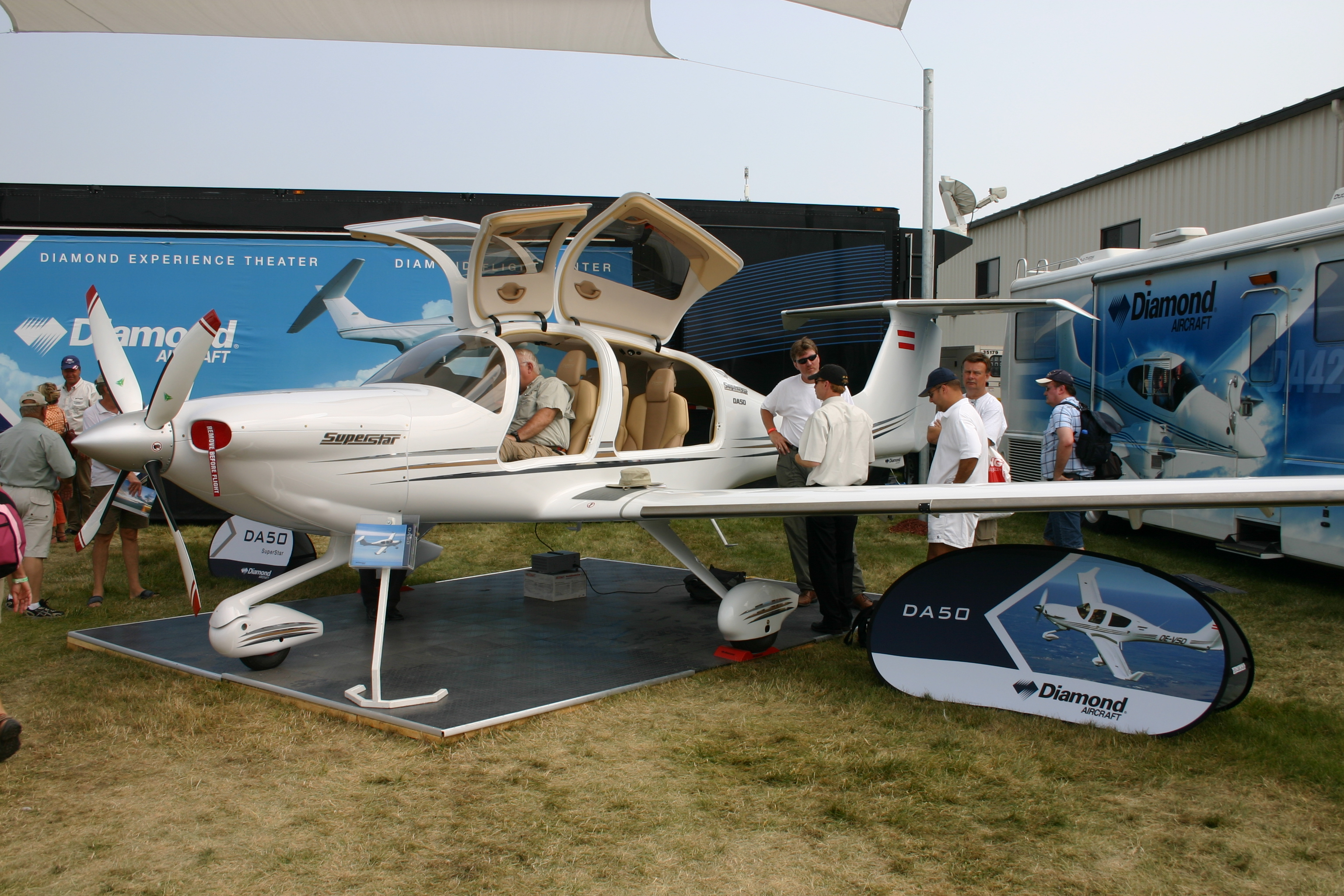
Diamond DA50 five seater

At the April 2017 AERO Friedrichshafen show, along with diesel variants of the DA50, the composite Diamond DART 280 light-single piston-engined helicopter concept was launched. It will compete with the Robinson R44 with a 1,350 kg (2,980 lb) MTOW and a 210 kW (280 shp)) four-stroke jet-fuel engine. A first flight was scheduled for the autumn of 2018, with certification forecast for a year later but this did not come to pass.

In December 2017, Wanfeng Aviation purchased the remainder of the shares in Diamond.

At the December 2018 MEBAA, the Saudi Arabian National Company of Aviation-CAE Inc. Training Centre in Dammam ordered 60 single-engine DA40 NG and twin-engine DA42-VI, to be delivered over five years, with Garmin G1000 NXi glass panels and diesel engines.

=== Research ===
Diamond is testing automatic landing procedures, and is developing a hybrid electric quad-tiltrotor prototype using technology tested in their E-Star.

== Products ==
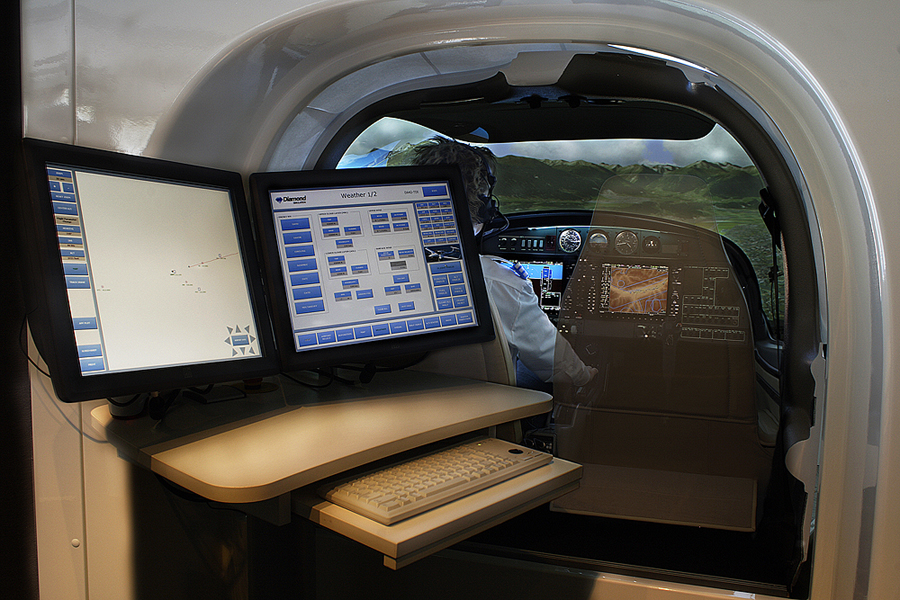
DAV42 simulator

=== Simulators ===
- D-SIM-20
- D-SIM-40
- D-SIM-42
- D-SIM-D-JET

=== Aircraft ===
Model name	First flight	Number built	Type
Diamond DA20/DV20	1991	1,000+	Single piston engine monoplane utility airplane
Diamond DA40 Star	1997	2,200+	Single piston engine monoplane utility airplane
Diamond DA42 TwinStar	2002	600+	Twin piston engine monoplane utility airplane
Diamond DA50	2007		Single piston engine monoplane utility airplane
Diamond DA62	2015	100+	Twin piston engine monoplane utility airplane
Diamond DART 450	2016		Single turboprop monoplane trainer
Diamond D-Jet	2006	3	Single jet engine monoplane business airplane
Diamond Hero	2012		Proposed unmanned aerial vehicle
Diamond HK36 Dimona/DA36 E-Star	1989	900+	Single piston engine motor glider

== See also ==
- Cirrus Aircraft
- Tecnam
