= Piper PA-47 PiperJet =

American prototype VLJ

PA-47 "PiperJet" PiperJet Altaire
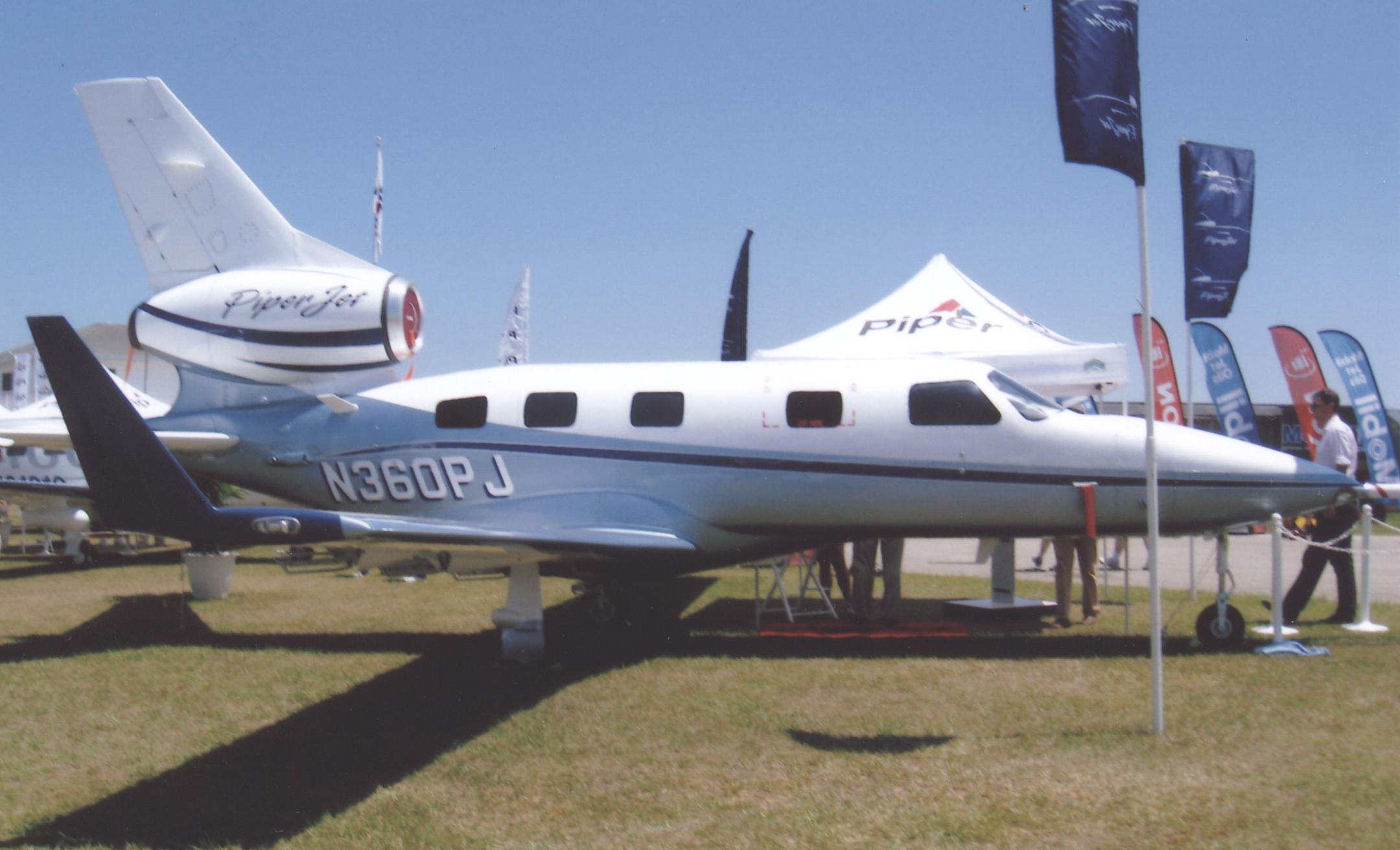
- The prototype PA-47 "PiperJet" at Sun 'n Fun in Lakeland, Florida, in April 2009

General information
- Type: Very light jet
- National origin: United States
- Manufacturer: Piper Aircraft
- Status: Canceled
- Number built: 1

History
- First flight: 30 July 2008

The Piper PA-47 "PiperJet" was a single-engined very light jet (VLJ) that was intended to be developed and built by Piper Aircraft. However, following a change of ownership at Piper, it was decided to redesign the aircraft as the PiperJet Altaire. Despite being technically successful, the Altaire project was canceled in October 2011 due to economic conditions. The aircraft is the first proposed single-engined civilian aircraft with a podded engine located on the tail.

== Design and development ==
=== PiperJet ===
The PiperJet was announced in October 2006, as a competitor to the twin-engined Eclipse 500 and Cessna Citation Mustang. The aircraft's fuselage was the same cross section as the propeller-driven Piper PA-46 series, with a 4 feet (1.2 m) increase in length. It was to be capable of carrying up to 7 passengers and cruise at 360 knots (414.3 mph; 666.7 km/h), at a maximum altitude of 35,000 feet (10,668.0 m). Maximum range was expected to be 1,300 nautical miles (1,496.0 mi; 2,407.6 km), with a full-fuel payload of 800 pounds. Piper selected Williams International to supply its FJ44-3AP turbofan engine for the PiperJet.

Due to the engine being mounted above the center of gravity, power was highly stabilizing (addition of power would push the nose down), which could have been disconcerting to pilots. Initially, Piper designers incorporated an automatic pitch trim system to coordinate horizontal stabilizer angle of incidence with power setting. This system was later replaced by a vectored thrust nozzle, developed by Williams International, which resulted in reduced weight and simplified manufacturing processes.

A design feature of the aircraft was the use of a straight duct air intake design for the vertical stabilizer (tail) mounted engine, similar in engineering design concept to a McDonnell Douglas DC-10, rather than the s-duct arrangement of most trijet aircraft designs such as the Dassault Falcon 900.

A selling price of US$2.199 million in 2006 dollars was initially set and as of February 19, 2007, Piper announced that it had received 180 pre-orders. An entry-into-service date of early 2010 was initially anticipated, later changed to 2011-12. In October 2009 the company indicated that it had delayed the delivery of the first customer aircraft to mid-2013 and had informed depositors.

The PiperJet did not enter production and in October 2010 Piper announced it would instead develop an aircraft with a larger circular-section fuselage known as the Piper PiperJet Altaire. The 160 customers who had placed orders for the PiperJet retained their delivery positions with the new aircraft and at the same $2.2 million price.

=== Altaire ===
Based on the PA-47 PiperJet prototype, the Altaire featured a slightly larger fuselage with a rounded cross-section, and included a conventional control yoke for flight control, as opposed to the original PiperJet's side-stick.

Piper had been tooling up its facilities in Vero Beach, Florida (USA) to build four Altaire prototypes to be used for FAA (safety & performance) certification of the aircraft through 2013. First delivery of aircraft to customers was scheduled for 2014. The first flight was expected in 2012.

The fuselage of the original Piperjet was designed using the Piper Meridian single-engine turboprop as a template. The new owners of Piper, Imprimis, found fault with this design prompting a revision without direct reference to the Meridian. According to Piper CEO Geoffrey Berger, "We wanted to give our jet customers an even roomier light jet that incorporates a scalable design, paving the way for a future family of competitive business jets,". The new fuselage design provided an additional 4 inches of headroom and nine more inches of elbow room and does away with a hump in the cabin floor that accommodated the wing spar in the old design.

The Altaire had been designed for single-pilot operation allowing one passenger to occupy the co-pilot's seat. Combined with 4 passenger seats in the cabin behind the flight deck, the jet would typically have seated 5 passengers. The cabin would have been specially configured to add an additional seat such that a total of 6 passengers can be accommodated in addition to the pilot. There was 20 cubic feet (570 L) of baggage space behind the passenger seats and another 20 cu ft (570 L). of heated but unpressurized space in the nose of the aircraft.

The Altaire would have been powered by the Williams International FJ44-3AP. This model of engine employs a "passive vectored thrust" design that helps compensate for nose-down pitch of the aircraft when power is increased as a result of mounting the engine relatively high up in the tail. Piper estimated that this engine would get the Altaire up to a 35,000 feet (11,000 m) maximum cruise altitude and a 320 knots (370 mph) cruise speed. Maximum cruise speed was projected to be 360 knots (410 mph). The aircraft was expected to have a 1,200-to-1,300-nautical-mile (1,400 to 1,500 mi; 2,200 to 2,400 km) non-stop range.

The aircraft was expected to retail for around US$2.6 million, 'standard' equipped. Piper estimates variable operating cost at about US$730 per hour. This compares with about US$870 for the comparable model Cessna Mustang.

== Cancellation ==
On 17 October 2011 the company announced that the PiperJet Altaire program was "under review". Piper's new interim CEO, appointed that same day, Simon Caldecott said, "This is being undertaken to ensure the company is properly aligning business goals and light-jet market forecasts with investment strategies and economic forecasts." The next day, on 18 October 2011, AVweb editor-in-chief Russ Niles called for the project to be ended, calling it "unrealistic" to pursue the design in the face of Federal Aviation Administration opposition to certifying a single engined jet to 35,000 ft (10,668 m) and the lack of economic reasoning as the aircraft would cost the same as most twin-engined jets. Niles called on Piper saying, "the sooner it ends its "review" of the project and puts a bullet in it the better." On 24 October 2011, despite the Altaire's development being "on schedule and on budget", the program was indefinitely suspended by Piper due to economic issues, with the company laying off a number of workers who had been assigned to the project. It was stated the company would entertain offers for the PiperJet/Altaire project.

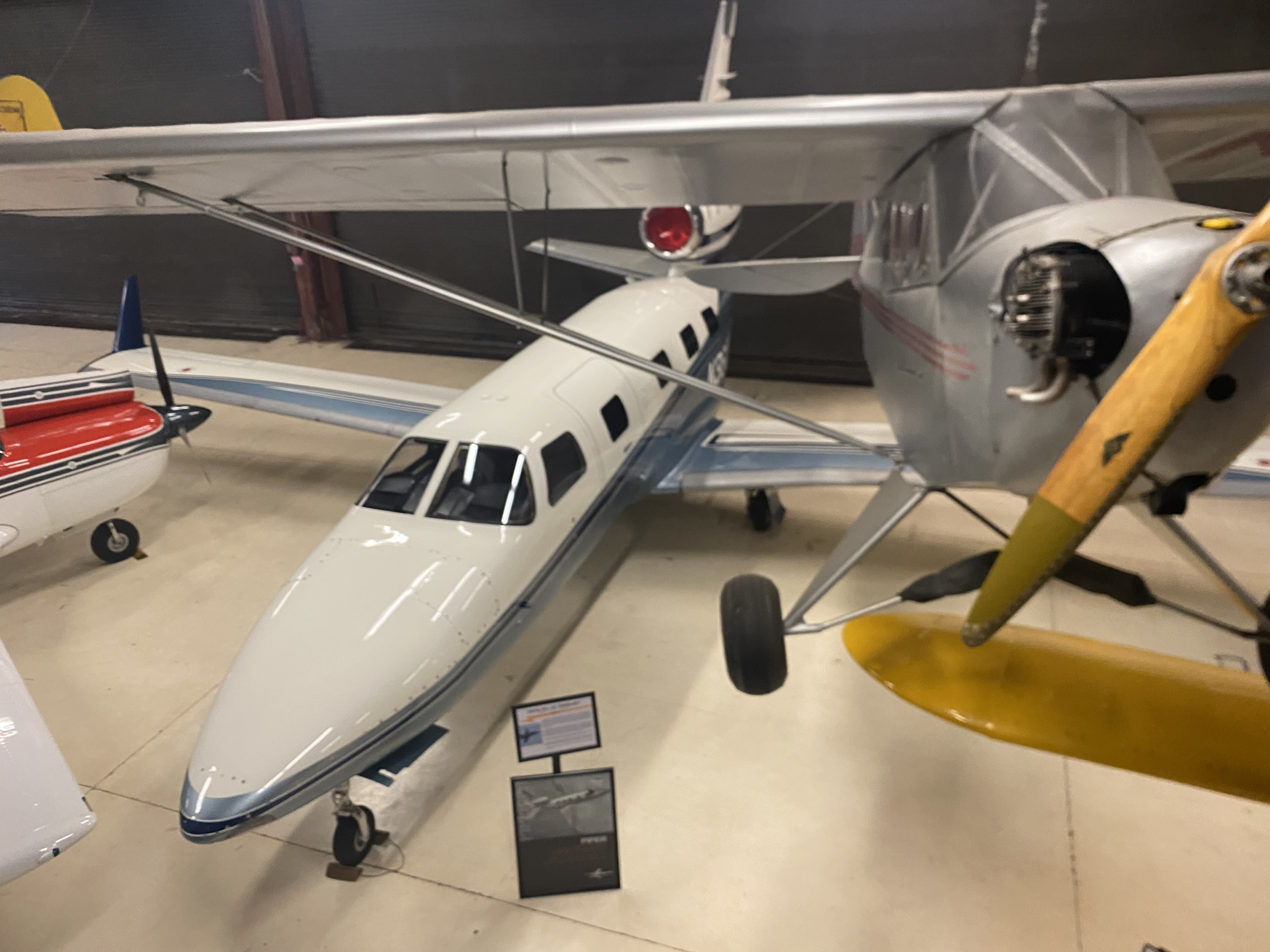
Piper Jet at the Piper Aviation Museum Hangar in Lock Haven, PA.

In 2012, the prototype was located at the Florida Air Museum; by 2025, it was on display at the Piper Aviation Museum in Lock Haven, Pennsylvania.

== Specifications (original PA-47 PiperJet) ==
Data from Piper Aircraft

General characteristics

- Crew: 1 or 2 pilots
- Capacity: 6-7 passengers
- Length: 35 ft 8 in (10.87 m)
- Wingspan: 44 ft 3 in (13.49 m)
- Height: 15 ft 8 in (4.78 m)
- Full fuel payload: intended to be 800 lbs (363 kg) +/-5%
- Powerplant: 1 × Williams FJ44-3AP turbofan, 2,820 lbf (12.5 kN) thrust

Performance

- Cruise speed: 360 kn (410 mph, 670 km/h) (intended maximum cruise speed +5% -2.5%)
- Range: 1,300 nmi (1,500 mi, 2,400 km) (intended maximum range +/-5%)
- Service ceiling: 35,000 ft (11,000 m)

Avionics

- Garmin glass cockpit

== See also ==
- Very light jet

Related development

- Piper PA-46

Aircraft of comparable role, configuration, and era

- Adam A700
- Cirrus Vision SF50
- Diamond D-Jet
- Eclipse 500
- Embraer Phenom 100
- Cessna Citation Mustang
- Honda HA-420 HondaJet
