= Diamond Hero =

Austrian unmanned aerial vehicle

Hero

General information
- Type: Unmanned aerial vehicle
- National origin: Austria
- Manufacturer: Diamond Aircraft Industries
- Status: Under development

History
- Introduction date: April 2012
- First flight: April 2012

The Diamond Hero is an Austrian helicopter unmanned aerial vehicle under development by Diamond Aircraft Industries and introduced at the Aero show held in Friedrichshafen in April 2012. The aircraft builds on Diamond's experience building airborne sensor systems based on the Diamond DA42.

== Design and development ==
The aircraft was designed to be an autonomous UAV that incorporates artificial intelligence and will be able to exercise its own flight judgment. For instance, in the event of an engine failure, the aircraft will be able to examine the terrain below it and pick the best location for an autorotational landing. Diamond Aircraft CEO Christian Dries said of the aircraft on 19 April 2012, "it's a little bit beyond a regular unmanned aircraft."

The aircraft is powered by two Austro Engine AE55 Wankel engines and will be able to lift a 250 lb (113 kg) sensor payload for 6.5 hours of flight endurance or four hours of hover endurance. It also has a recovery parachute.

== Specifications (Hero) ==
Data from AVweb

General characteristics

- Crew: none
- Powerplant: 2 × Austro Engine AE55 Wankel engines

Performance

- Endurance: 6.5 hours
