= Wanfeng Auto Holding Group =

Chinese automotive company

Wanfeng Auto Holding Group Co., Ltd.
- Native name: 万丰奥特控股集团
- Company type: Public
- Industry: manufacturing
- Founded: 1994
- Founder: Chen Ailian
- Headquarters: Xinchang County, China
- Key people: Chen Bin (Chairman)
- Products: automotive, aviation, industry, real estate
- Services: finance
- Number of employees: 12,000
- Website: www.wfjt.com

Wanfeng Auto Holding Group Co., Ltd.
- Simplified Chinese: 万丰奥特控股集团
- Traditional Chinese: 萬豐奧特控股集團
- Literal meaning: Wanfeng Aote Holding Group
Transcriptions
Standard Mandarin
- Hanyu Pinyin: Wànfēng Àotè Kònggǔ Jítuán

Wanfeng Auto Holding Group (simplified Chinese: 万丰奥特控股集团; traditional Chinese: 萬豐奧特控股集團), fully referred to as Wanfeng Auto Holding Group Co., Ltd., headquartered in Xinchang County, China, is a parts and equipment manufacturer for the automotive industry, and energy saving. The company was founded in 1994 by Chen Ailian. It manufactures lightweight metal parts: aluminium wheels and magnesium alloy materials, and provides environmental protection coatings, hybrid vehicle and electric vehicle assembly and powertrain systems, technical services and control systems. It is involved in aircraft manufacturing and research & development, airport construction and management and general aviation operations: aerial sightseeing, air sports and flight training services.

It supplies industrial automatic gating systems, low pressure die cast machines and auxiliary equipment, with consulting and maintenance and repair services, and provides automation for auto and heavy industries and industrial robot intelligent equipment. It provides private equity, hedge fund and finance leasing services. It designs, develops, and constructs real estate properties and services high-rise buildings, multi-story residences, villas, office buildings, community and commercial buildings and government properties.

It is amongst the Chinese Private Enterprises Top 500 (#123) and China Auto Industry Top 30 (#18). It is listed on the Shenzhen Stock Exchange and is a part of the SZSE 200 Index.

Wanfeng Auto wheel started manufacturing aluminum motorcycle wheels in 1994 and automotive aluminum wheels in 1998. Today Wanfeng has 5 automotive wheel plants in China - Xinchang, Ningbo, Jilin, Chongqing and Weihai which has a combined capacity to produce more than 24 million auto wheels per year. Wanfeng Auto Wheel also has 3 motorcycle manufacturing plants including one in India. Together, they have an output of more than 18 million motorcycle alloy wheels annually.

In 2017, Wanfeng Holding Group acquired Diamond Aircraft
