= Honda HA-420 HondaJet =

Very light business jet

HA-420 HondaJet
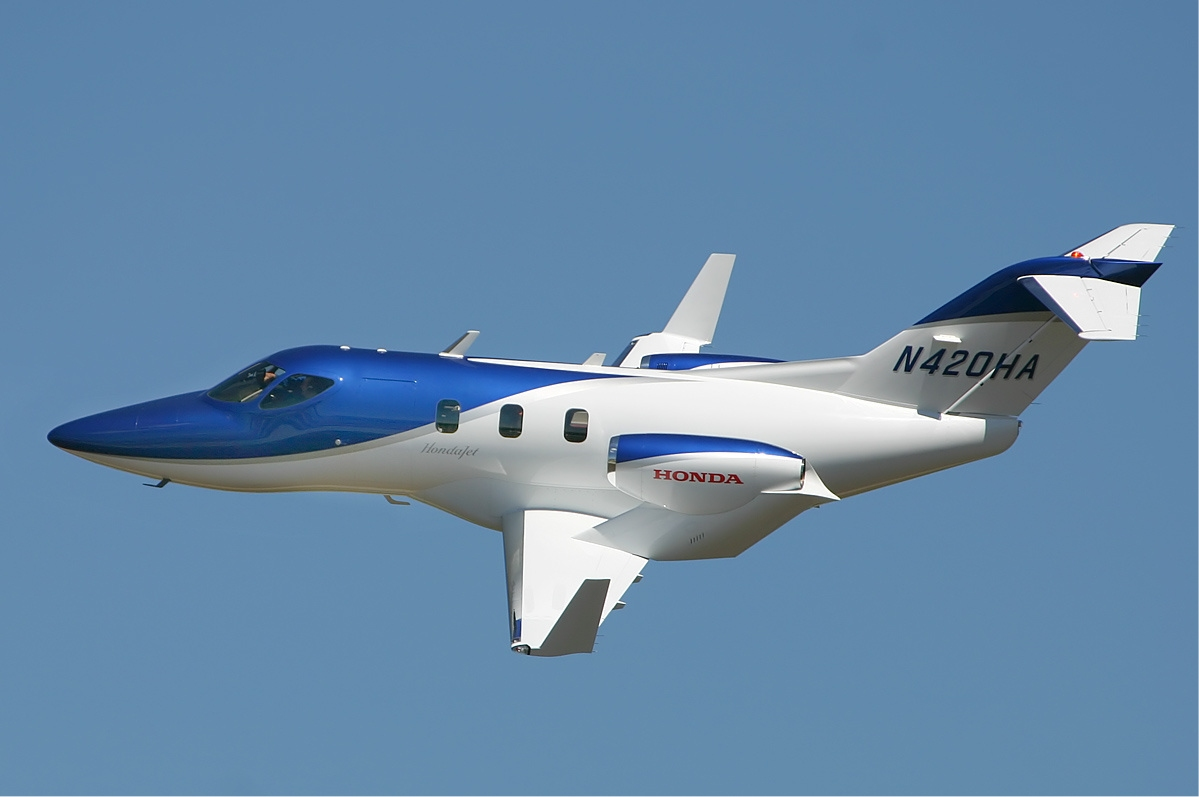
- Early prototype at the 2005 EAA AirVenture Oshkosh

General information
- Type: Light business jet
- National origin: Japan; United States
- Manufacturer: Honda Aircraft Company
- Status: In production, in service
- Number built: 271 (Q4 2025)

History
- Manufactured: December 2015–present
- First flight: December 3, 2003

The Honda HA-420 HondaJet is a light business jet produced by the Honda Aircraft Company of Greensboro, North Carolina, United States. Original concepts of the aircraft started in 1997 and were completed in 1999. It took its maiden flight on December 3, 2003, received its FAA type certificate in December 2015, and was first delivered that same month.

The six- or seven-seat aircraft has a composite fuselage and an aluminum wing, and is powered by two unusually mounted GE Honda HF120 turbofans, on pylons above the wing. It can cruise at 422 knots [kn] (782 km/h; 486 mph) and has a range of up to 1,547 nautical miles [nmi] (2,865 km; 1,780 mi). The HondaJet has received several aeronautic design and innovation accolades.

== Development ==
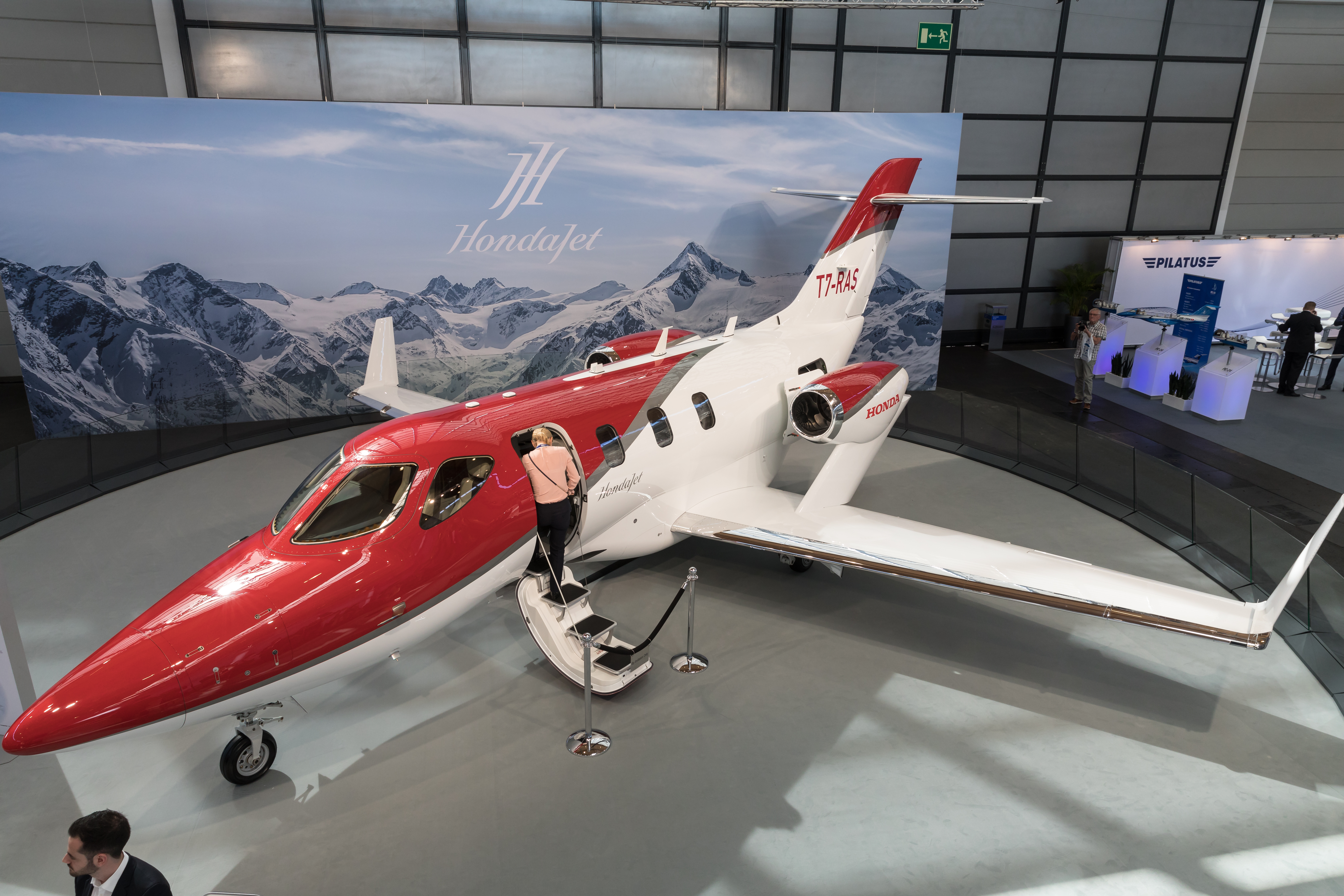
The HA-420 made its first flight in 2003, and received FAA type certificate in 2015.

Honda began to study small-sized business jets in the late 1980s, using engines from other manufacturers. The Honda MH01 turboprop used an all-composite construction, and the Honda MH02 was fabricated and assembled at Mississippi State University's Raspet Flight Research Laboratory in the late 1980s and early 1990s. The MH02 was a prototype using carbon fiber/epoxy composite materials and was the first all-composite light business jet to fly. Flight testing on the MH02 continued through 1996, after which the aircraft was shipped to Japan.

Lead designer and company founder Michimasa Fujino began sketching the HondaJet in 1997, and the concept was solidified in 1999. According to Fujino, design of the HondaJet nose was inspired by Salvatore Ferragamo shoes. Testing in the Boeing windtunnel indicated a valid concept in 1999.

In October 2000, Honda R&D Americas established a research facility at the Piedmont Triad International Airport in Greensboro, North Carolina. On December 3, 2003, a proof-of-concept HondaJet conducted its first successful test flight at the Greensboro facility. At this point, Honda executives remained unsure about whether or not to commercialize the HondaJet program. To better understand the commercial potential of the HondaJet, Fujino publicly displayed it for the first time on July 28, 2005, at the annual EAA AirVenture Oshkosh airshow. The debut attracted strong interest, and convinced Honda executives to commercialize the HondaJet, which Honda publicly announced at the following year's AirVenture.

In 2006, Honda announced the commercialization of the jet with a first delivery then planned for 2010. At the time, pricing was set at $3.65 million. The first FAA-conforming (built to Federal Aviation Administration rules) HondaJet achieved its first flight on December 20, 2010. The first flight of the first production HondaJet occurred on June 27, 2014, and it was displayed at that year's AirVenture on July 28. Four HondaJets had test-flown 2,500 hours as of 2015.

The HondaJet was awarded a provisional type certificate by the FAA in March 2015. This enabled continued production and demonstration flights, including a HondaJet tour in Japan and Europe in 2015. The aircraft received its FAA type certificate in December 2015, and received its European Aviation Safety Agency (EASA) type certificate in May 2016. The HondaJet was also certified in Japan in December 2018.

Estimates for Honda's investment into the Hondajet program range from one to 1.5-2 billion dollars.

=== Production ===
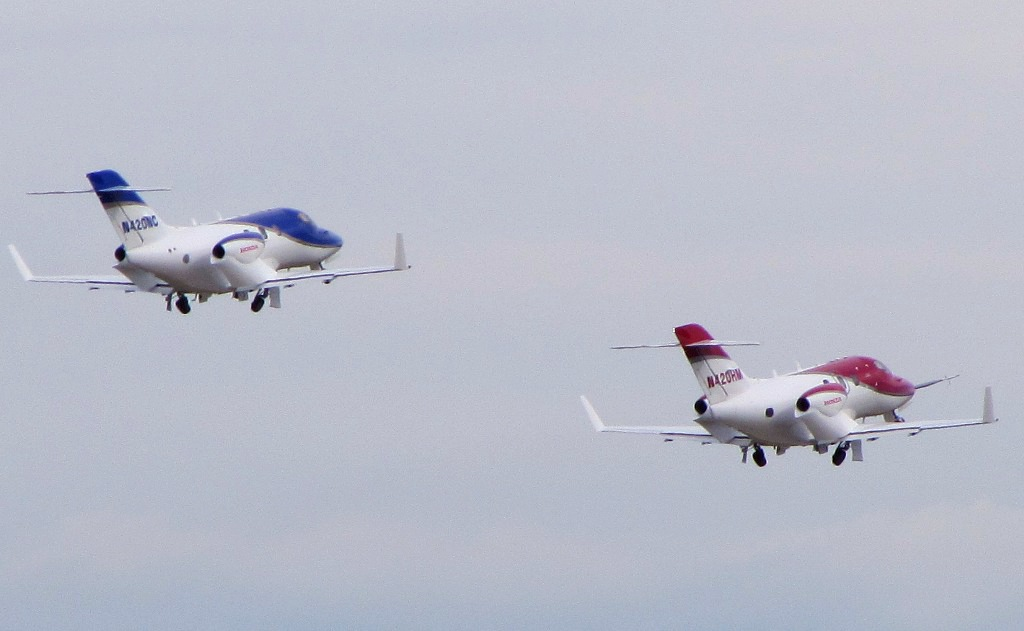
HondaJet formation

The production aircraft are built at Piedmont Triad International Airport. Construction of the factory began in 2007 and was completed in late 2011. In early 2015, there were 12 aircraft in final assembly and five more in earlier stages of production. Twenty aircraft were in production by May 2015. Honda estimated it would produce 40 aircraft in the first full year and up to 60 each year after that. The engine factory achieved certification in March 2015.

Honda delivered the first customer aircraft on December 23, 2015, at its world headquarters in Greensboro, North Carolina. The first delivery of a HondaJet to a European aircraft dealer took place in April 2016. About 20% of the first 100 aircraft ordered were destined for European customers, according to coverage in April 2016.

Honda planned to ramp up production to 80 units per year after March 2019. Sixteen aircraft were delivered in the first three quarters of 2016, reaching a 36-per-year production rate. In 2017, 15 were produced in the first quarter, and the annual target is between 55 and 60 aircraft. After deliveries began in late 2015, the HondaJet soon became one of the top-selling aircraft in its class.

In July 2019, Honda Aircraft began construction of a new $15.5 million, 82,000-square-foot (7,600 m^{2}) wing assembly center on its campus. The new facility, which is meant to enhance production efficiency by allowing wings to be assembled concurrently, was opened in September 2020.

=== HondaJet Elite ===
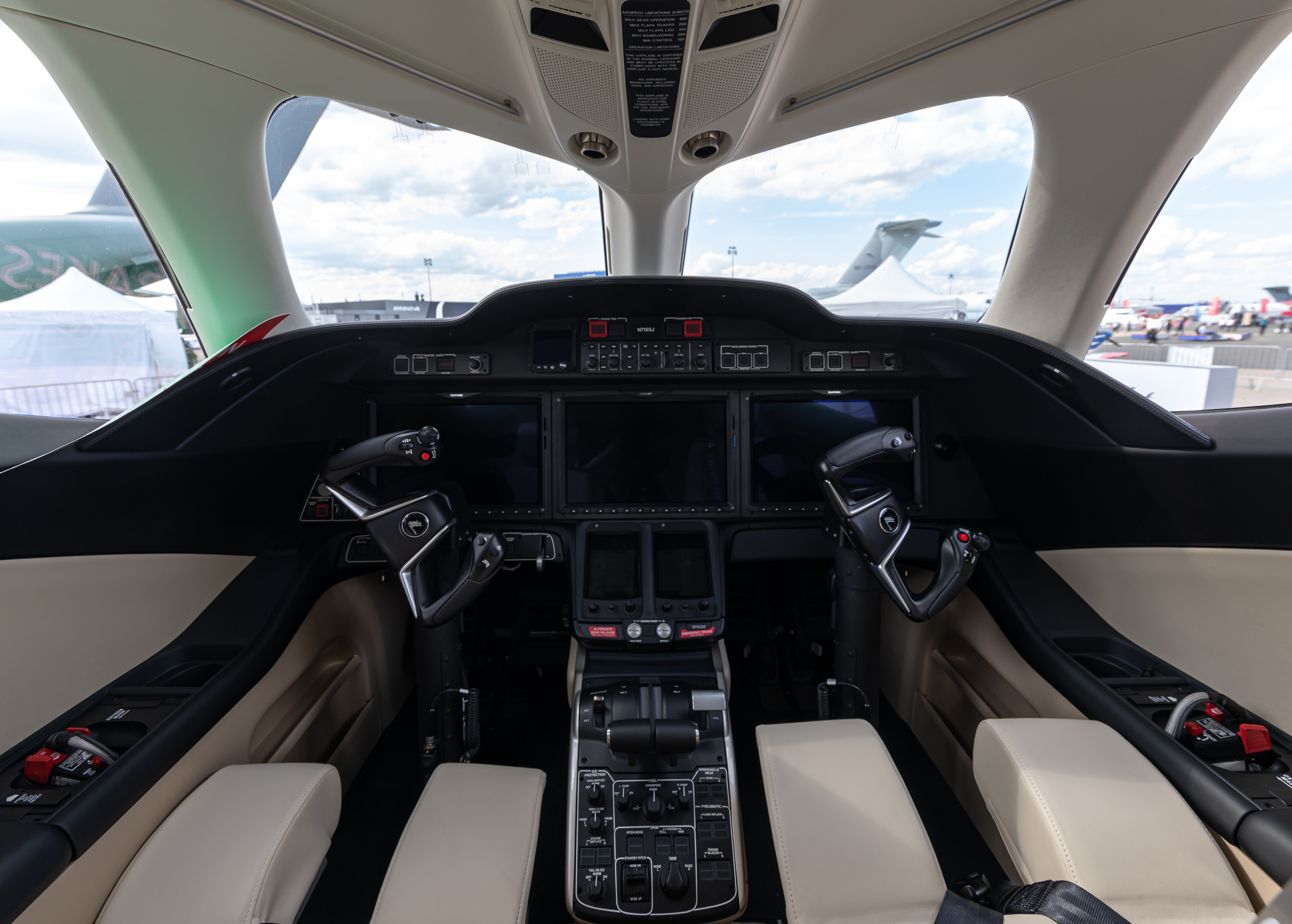
HA-420 flightdeck

In May 2018, the $5.2 million (as of 2018) HondaJet Elite was revealed, with an expanded performance envelope, improved interior and updated flight deck. The type certificate was amended by the FAA on May 2, 2018, and soon followed by EASA. Honda began deliveries on August 7, 2018.

Elite's elevator authority is increased to reduce its takeoff roll by 500 to 3,491 ft (152 to 1,064 m), reducing the Cessna Citation M2's take-off advantage. Range is increased by 214 to 1,437 nmi (396 to 2,661 km; 246 to 1,654 mi) with an auxiliary fuel tank and aerodynamic improvements. The horizontal stabilizer tips are extended slightly and hinge gaps tightened up, allowing energized flow over the stabilizer without its vortex generators. A new engine inlet reduces vibration and cabin noise, the lavatory receives a belted seat allowing a seventh occupant even with a galley; avionics improvements with Garmin G3000-based flight deck include takeoff and landing (TOLD) calculations, angle of attack protection, and Flight Stream 510functionality.

Elite's payload is increased by over 200 lb (91 kg): 107 pounds (49 kg) from the empty weight reduction and 100 pounds (45 kg) from an increased maximum takeoff weight, while 16 US gal (61 L) larger fuel tank fills unused space in the aft fuselage.

At a weight of 9,500 lb (4,300 kg) and ISA+3 °C, the HondaJet Elite cruises at Mach 0.676 or 390 kn (720 km/h) TAS, while burning 570 lb (260 kg) per hour, better than book predictions.

In October 2019, Honda Aircraft Company presented the first medevac-configured HondaJet Elite for air ambulance use. In the same month, a HondaJet Elite flew to the 2019 National Business Aviation Association meeting using sustainable aviation fuel. Also in 2019, HondaJet received type certification in China, Canada, and Turkey. By then, its unit cost was US$5.28 million.

In 2020, EASA certified HondaJet Elite for steep approaches (descent angles of up to 5.5°), and for up to eight occupants (with the galley replaced by a seat). In May 2021, the MTOW of the Elite S was raised by 91 kg (200 lb). In 2022, its equipped price was $5.75M.

=== HondaJet Elite II ===
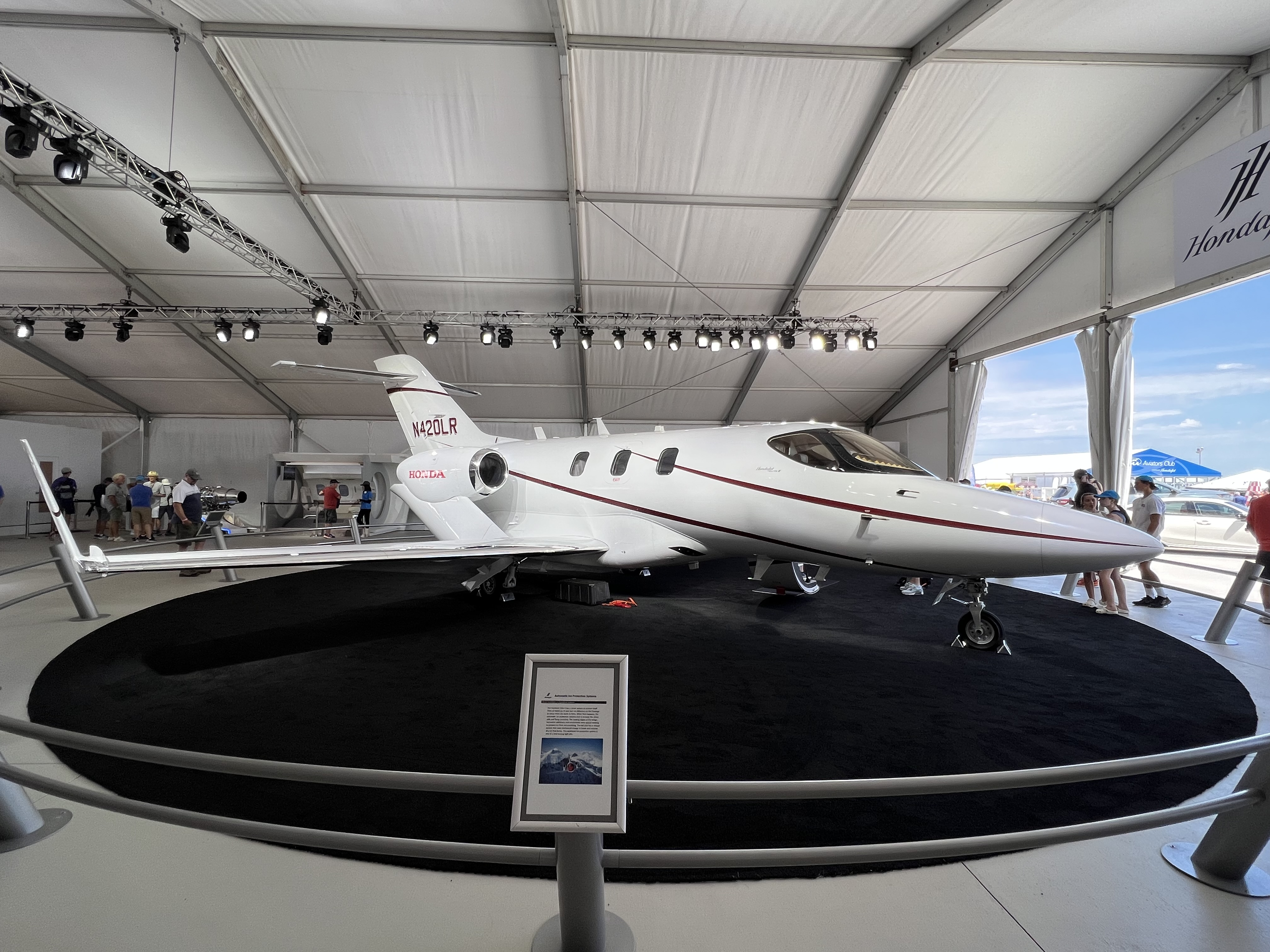
HondaJet Elite II at EAA AirVenture Oshkosh in 2023

Announced on October 17, 2022, the $6.95 million new model has improved aerodynamics, increased fuel capacity and gross weight by 200 lb (91 kg), giving a range of 1,547 nmi (2,865 km; 1,780 mi) and a cruise of 422 kn (782 km/h; 486 mph). It has a Garmin G3000 integrated flight deck, autothrottles from the first half of 2023 and a Garmin emergency autoland system later on in 2023. It features a new paint scheme and redesigned interior. FAA certification was received on November 2, 2022.

=== HondaJet APMG ===
To retrofit some of the upgrades of HondaJet Elite to pre-Elite HondaJets, an APMG (Advanced Performance Modification Group) upgrade is available for $250,000. This includes 100 to 120 nmi range increase, and a 45 kg (99 lb) MTOW increase and take-off run reduction by 135 m (443 ft) to 1,064 m (3,491 ft); this is achieved by an extending the span of the horizontal tailplane by a few inches, and by removing wing fences and vortex generators. Avionics upgrades include takeoff and landing (TOLD) calculations, Flight Stream 510 wireless gateway compatibility, an enhanced electronic checklist, angle-of-attack indicator on the PFD, and visual approaches. On the other hand, HondaJet Elite features such as an additional fuel tank or engine inlet acoustic improvement, are not available with APMG.

=== HondaJet APMG S ===
In December 2025, Honda introduced an upgrade package APMG S, to bring HondaJet Classic and HondaJet APMG aircraft closer to the HondaJet Elite S. The package includes avionics software and hardware upgrades, a gain of 300-pound in maximum takeoff weight for load and operational flexibility, and the Advanced Steering Augmentation System which sharpens directional control and handling precision during taxi, takeoff, and landing rolls, a key features from the HondaJet Elite S,.

=== HA-480 Echelon ===
Keeping the original HondaJet configuration, the 2600 concept has a stretched fuselage and enlarged wingspan.

On October 12, 2021, Honda unveiled the HondaJet 2600 Concept, at the 2021 NBAA Business Aviation Convention and Exhibition as a mockup was displayed; with a cabin for up to 11 seats, it offers a range of 2,625 nmi (4,862 km; 3,021 mi), a cruising speed of 450 kn (830 km/h; 520 mph) and a ceiling of 47,000 ft (14,000 m). The $10–12 million jet would be the longest-range single-pilot business aircraft, it would keep the HondaJet configuration, stretched from 42.6 to 57.8 ft (13.0 to 17.6 m), and has a 56.7 ft (17.3 m) wingspan, 16 ft (4.9 m) larger, for a maximum takeoff weight of 17,500 lb (7,900 kg) and a 3,300 ft (1,000 m) takeoff distance, while its fuselage cross-section is more ovoid with a taller 62.5 in (1,590 mm) height. With a double club seating, the HondaJet 2600 concept was intended for testing the market to assess demand before deciding to launch the program.

In June 2023, the company announced that it will proceed to production of the HondaJet 2600. The HA-480 Echelon is to be certified as a variant to share a common type rating with similar Garmin G3000 cockpits. By October 2023, it had received 350 letters of intent. Assembly is projected to begin in 2025, with the first flight planned for late 2026 in anticipation of certification in 2028 or 2029. It will be powered by 3,600 lbf (16 kN) Williams FJ44-4C turbofans and Spirit AeroSystems will build a new carbon-fibre fuselage for a 11.4 cm (4.5 in) higher, 14–18 cm (5.5–7.1 in) wider cabin. It should be 20% more fuel-efficient than its competition, the Cessna Citation CJ3/CJ4, Embraer Phenom 300 and Pilatus PC-24.

== Design ==
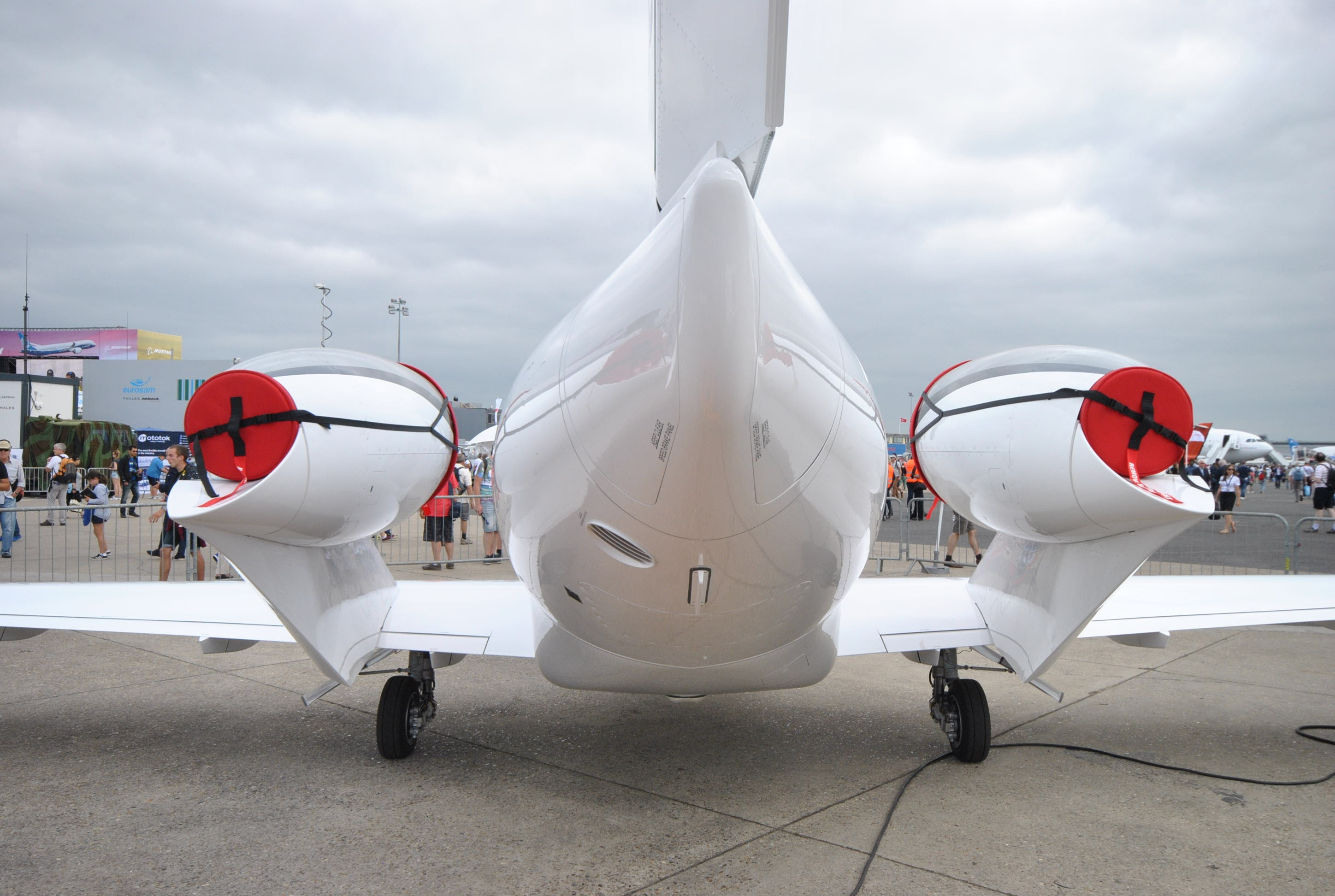
Rear view of the aircraft's overwing podded engine configuration

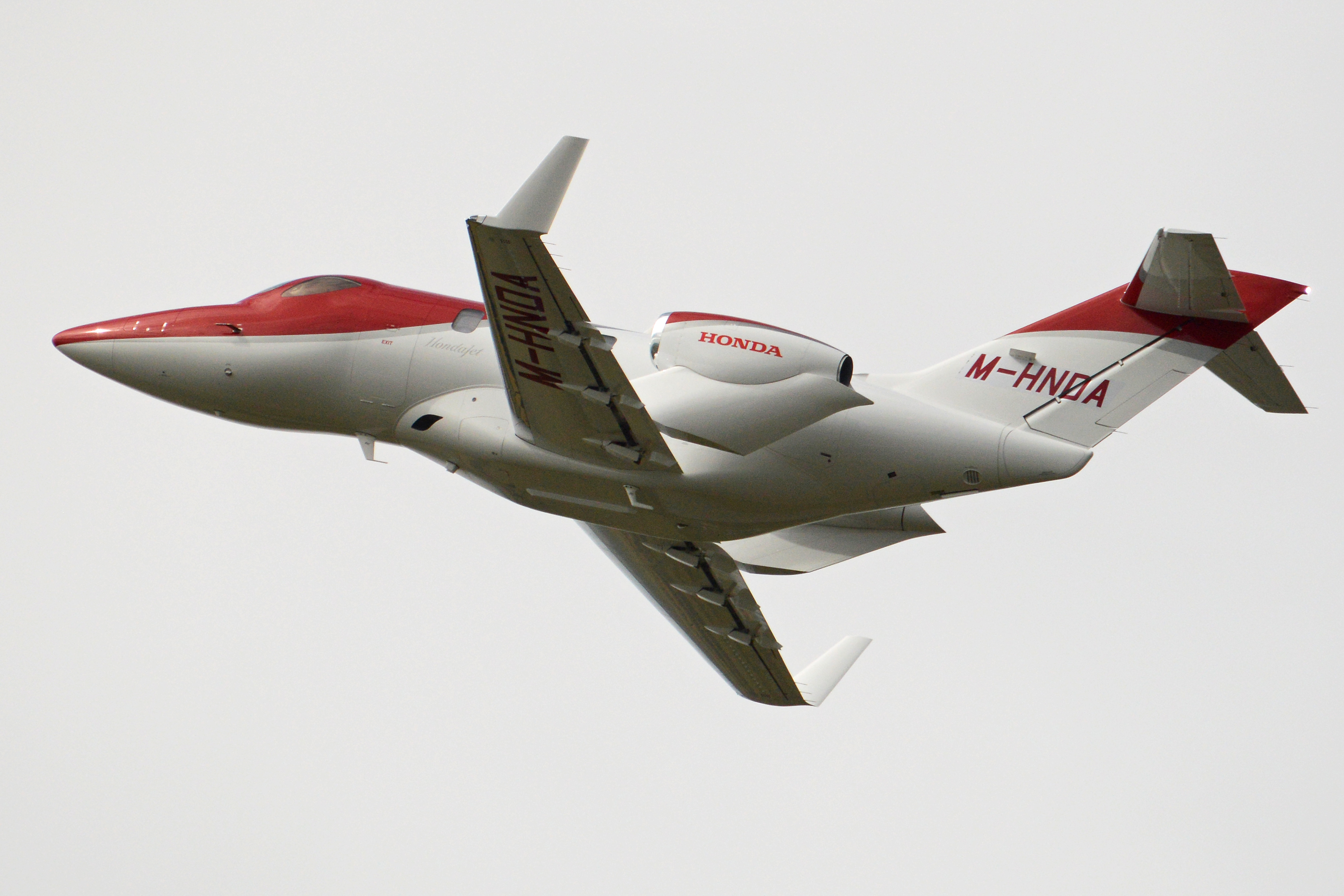
Showing the nearly straight wing

The HondaJet is a low-wing monoplane that uses a composite fuselage and an aluminum wing. It belongs to the very light jet category.

It uses two engines mounted on pylons above the wing, a configuration called Over-The-Wing Engine Mount, or OTWEM, by Honda Aircraft. This configuration maximizes cabin space by removing the structure required to mount engines on the rear of the fuselage. A similar over-wing engine configuration was used in the 1970s on the VFW-Fokker 614, but had limited the aircraft's speed due to interference between the engine and the wing. This, along with the overall commercial failure of the VFW-Fokker 614, made the over-wing configuration unpopular with aircraft designers. To avoid these issues, Honda used computer analysis and wind tunnel testing to find the optimal position for engine placement on top of the wings, which was determined to be at 75 percent of the wing chord. The HondaJet's engines are positioned in such a way that the airflow over the wing is superimposed with the airflow around the engine to minimize wave drag at high speed. The HondaJet designer calls this "favorable interference." This configuration not only eliminated the problems associated with earlier over-wing engine mounts, but actually reduced wave drag compared to a conventional rear-fuselage mounted configuration. OTWEM configuration is often named the most unusual feature of the HondaJet.

The nose and wing are designed for laminar flow, and the main fuselage has a constant profile, making an eventual stretch easier. The combination of engine placement, wing and fuselage was achieved using computer simulations and wind tunnels. The HondaJet has a retractable tricycle landing gear with both main and nose landing gear single-wheeled.

The aircraft is powered by two GE Honda HF120 turbofans, developed with GE Aviation under the GE-Honda partnership. Honda began developing its own small turbofan engine, the HF118, in 1999, leading to the HF120. The HF120 was test-flown on a Cessna Citation CJ1. The engine features a single fan, a two-stage compressor and a two-stage turbine. The GE Honda HF120 received FAA type certification on December 13, 2013, and production certification in 2015.

Honda claims that the combination of lightweight materials, aerodynamics and efficient engines gave the HondaJet up to 20% better fuel efficiency than similar aircraft. In 2019, Business & Commercial Aviation reported that for a 1,000 nmi (1,900 km; 1,200 mi) 4-passenger mission, HondaJet Elite uses 1,872 lb (849 kg) of fuel, compared to 1,919 lb (870 kg) (3% more) for the Phenom 100EV, and to 2,018 lb (915 kg) (8% more) for the Citation M2; for a 300 nmi (560 km; 350 mi) mission the numbers become 679 lb (308 kg), 753 lb (342 kg) (11% more), and 804 lb (365 kg) (18% more) respectively.

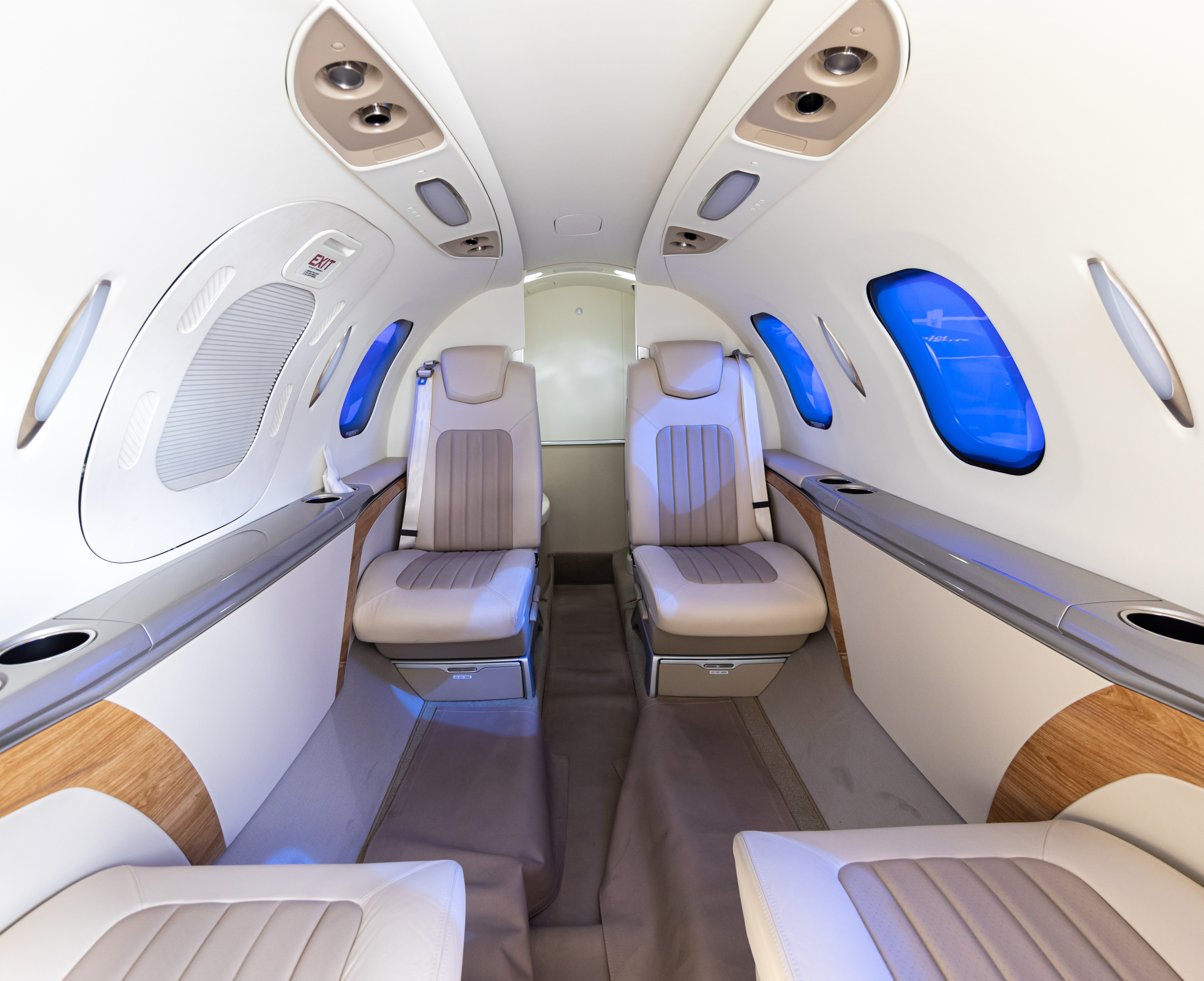
Honda HA-420 cabin seating

The interior dimensions are 17.80 ft (5.43 m) long, 5.00 ft (1.52 m) wide, and 4.83 ft (1.47 m) high, while the cabin is 12.1 ft (3.7 m) long besides the enclosed lavatory. Total interior volume is 324 cu ft (9.2 m^{3}), and luggage capacity is 66 cu ft (1.9 m^{3}). The aircraft is equipped with a touchscreen 3-display Garmin G3000 glass cockpit system.

=== Accolades ===
Michimasa Fujino received the Business & Commercial Aviation – Vision Award (2008), the AIAA – Aircraft Design Award (2012), the SAE International – Clarence L. (Kelly) Johnson Aerospace Vehicle Design and Development Award (2013), the 2014 ICAS award for Innovation in Aeronautics for leading the design, the Living Legends of Aviation Industry Leader of the Year award, as well as the 2021 AIAA Reed Aeronautics Award.

The HondaJet was included in the Robb Report – Best of the Best : Business Jets (2007), in the Aviation Week & Space Technology – Techs To Watch (2010), in the 2014 'Best of What's New' by Popular Science magazine, the Flying Magazine – Flying Innovation Award in 2017, and the AIN 2021 'Top Flight' Awards. The Honda Aircraft Company received the AIAA Foundation Award for Excellence in 2018.

== Operational history ==
HondaJet has an ICAO designator HDJT. As of December 2021, the 200 HondaJet aircraft in service have logged 98,000 hours with a 99.7% dispatch reliability.

=== Accidents involving the aircraft ===
As of August 2025, the HA-420 had been involved in six hull-loss accidents with five fatalities.

In May 2023, fractional ownership company Jet It voluntarily grounded its fleet of HA-420s, following a runway excursion on landing on May 17, 2023, which involved a different operator. Jet It CEO Glenn Gonzales indicated that Honda's customer support was "grossly inadequate" and announced plans in the autumn of 2022 to sell its fleet of HondaJets and buy Embraer Phenom 300s instead. As a result, Honda launched a lawsuit against Jet It in December 2022, for an alleged breach of contract in reselling one of its Honda aircraft, although the lawsuit was subsequently settled out of court. The HondaJet Owners and Pilots Association also called for a safety stand-down and meeting for its members, as a result of eight HondaJet accidents in the previous 12 months.

The first fatal accident involving a HondaJet happened on November 5, 2024, when an HA-420 with registration N57HP overran the runway on takeoff and crashed into a vehicle on the adjacent road at Falcon Field in Mesa, Arizona. Four of the five people on board the HondaJet and the driver of the vehicle were killed.

On April 7, 2025, HondaJet N826E overran the runway on landing at Southwest Oregon Regional Airport and ended up in Coos Bay. All five people on board survived.

== Specifications ==
Variant		HondaJet	HondaJet APMG	Elite	Elite S	Elite II	Echelon
Cockpit crew		1 or 2					
Typical seating		4 or 5 passengers		5 or 6 passengers			6, 8 or 9 passengers
Maximum seating (Note: With passenger in cockpit, optional side-facing seat, and belted lavatory.)		6 passengers		7 passengers			10 passengers
Length		42 ft 7 in (12.99 m)					57 ft 10 in (17.62 m)
Wingspan		39 ft 9 in (12.12 m)					56 ft 9 in (17.29 m)
Height		14 ft 11 in (4.54 m)					15 ft 11 in (4.84 m)
MTOW		10,600 lb (4,808 kg)	10,701 lb (4,854 kg)		10,900 lb (4,944 kg)	11,100 lb (5,035 kg)	17,550 lb (7,938 kg)
Cabin height		4.83 ft (1.47 m)					5 ft 3 in (1.59 m)
Cabin width		5 ft (1.52 m)					5 ft 1 in (1.55 m)
Engine (× 2)		GE Honda HF120, 2,050 lbf (9.1 kN) (Note: Derated from 2,095 lbf (9.32 kN))					Williams FJ44-4C, 3,450 lbf (15.3 kN)
Cruising speed		422 kn (782 km/h; 486 mph) at FL300					450 kn (830 km/h; 520 mph) at FL470
Range (Note: NBAA fuel reserve, IFR range)	4 occupants	1,223 nmi (2,265 km; 1,407 mi)	1,359 nmi (2,517 km; 1,564 mi)	1,437 nmi (2,661 km; 1,654 mi)		1,547 nmi (2,865 km; 1,780 mi)	—N/a
Range	5 occupants	—N/a		1,308 nmi (2,422 km; 1,505 mi)	1,402 nmi (2,597 km; 1,613 mi)	—N/a	2,625 nmi (4,862 km; 3,021 mi)

== Deliveries ==
Year	2015	2016	2017	2018	2019	2020	2021	2022	2023	2024	All
Deliveries	2	23	43	37	36	31	37	17	22	11	259
Billings (million $) (est.)	9	103.5	209.2	183.1	179.5	164.3	199.3	104.8	152.9	76.5	1,382.1
Average (million $) (est.)	4.5	4.5	4.87	4.95	4.99	5.3	5.39	6.16	6.95	6.95	5.34
Ref.											

Deliveries slowed in 2018 because of a combination of the transition to the HondaJet Elite, timing of fleet deliveries and customers' schedules. In 2020, they slowed again due to the COVID-19 pandemic.

== See also ==
Related development

- Honda MH02

Aircraft of comparable role, configuration, and era

- Cessna Citation Mustang
- Cessna Citation M2
- Eclipse 500 / 550
- Embraer Phenom 100

Related lists

- List of very light jets
