= Michimasa Fujino =

Japanese aerospace engineer and businessperson

- 藤野道格
- Born: March 1960 (age 66); Tokyo, Japan
- Education: University of Tokyo for Aeronautical Engineering, 1984
- Occupations: Aircraft designer, aviation entrepreneur
- Years active: 1984–2022
- Known for: Honda Aircraft Company founder, HondaJet
- Notable work: Case Study 4 HondaJet, Design and Development of the HondaJet

Michimasa Fujino (藤野 道格, Fujino Michimasa) (born March 1960) is a retired Japanese aeronautical engineer, entrepreneur, and founder of the Honda Aircraft Company, a subsidiary of the Honda Motor Company. Fujino worked as chief engineer within Honda R&D, then as vice president, before he was named the project leader for HondaJet development. He was also a Honda Motor managing officer. At Honda Aircraft, he played a crucial role in the growth of the company, and was responsible for the overall strategy of its design, development, certification, marketing, sales, and production of the HondaJet.

For his work at Honda Aircraft, Fujino has received the American Institute of Aeronautics and Astronautics (AIAA) Aircraft Design Award (2012), the SAE International Award, the Clarence L. Kelly Johnson Aerospace and Vehicle Design Award (2014), and the International Council of the Aeronautical Sciences Award for Innovation in Aeronautics. He is the first aircraft designer to receive all four awards, as well as the first individual of Asian descent to win the AIAA award, making him a notable figure in the contemporary aviation and very light jet industry.

Fujino was elected a member of the National Academy of Engineering in 2017 for the creation of the HondaJet and the formation of the Honda Aircraft Company. In 2022, it was announced that he would retire as president and CEO of the company in April, a post he held since its founding in 2006, and continue as a consultant following his retirement.

== Background ==
=== Education ===
Fujino holds a Bachelor of Science degree and Doctorate degree in aeronautical engineering from the University of Tokyo. He is also currently a fellow in several international organizations, including the American Institute for Aeronautics and Astronautics, the Royal Aeronautical Society, and SAE International. Fujino is also an international member of the National Academy of Engineering.

== Career ==
=== 1984–1997 ===
Fujino joined Honda Motor in 1984. He spent the first two years of his career in the automobile research division working on the development of a new electrical control steering system. Fujino was then assigned to Honda’s aviation research division.

In 1986, Fujino and the Honda aviation team were dispatched to the United States to conduct advanced aeronautics research with the Mississippi State University’s Raspet Flight Research Center. The team developed two experimental aircraft, the MH-01 turboprop and the MH-02 twin-engine light jet. Building on this experience, in 1997 Fujino began work on an entirely new aircraft, which would become the HondaJet.

=== 1997–2015 ===
After spending ten years in the United States, Fujino believed that there was great potential for Honda to enter the aviation industry by offering a high performance light jet. Specifically, he thought if Honda introduced an airplane with both high fuel efficiency and high speed that did not sacrifice cabin volume and luggage space, they could break into the business jet market. Fujino achieved this goal from a technical standpoint by developing an over-wing engine configuration, which allowed for a larger and quieter cabin by removing the engines from the rear of the fuselage to over the wing. His new design also featured a number of other innovations for a general aviation aircraft, including a natural-laminar flow wing, all-composite fuselage, and glass cockpit.

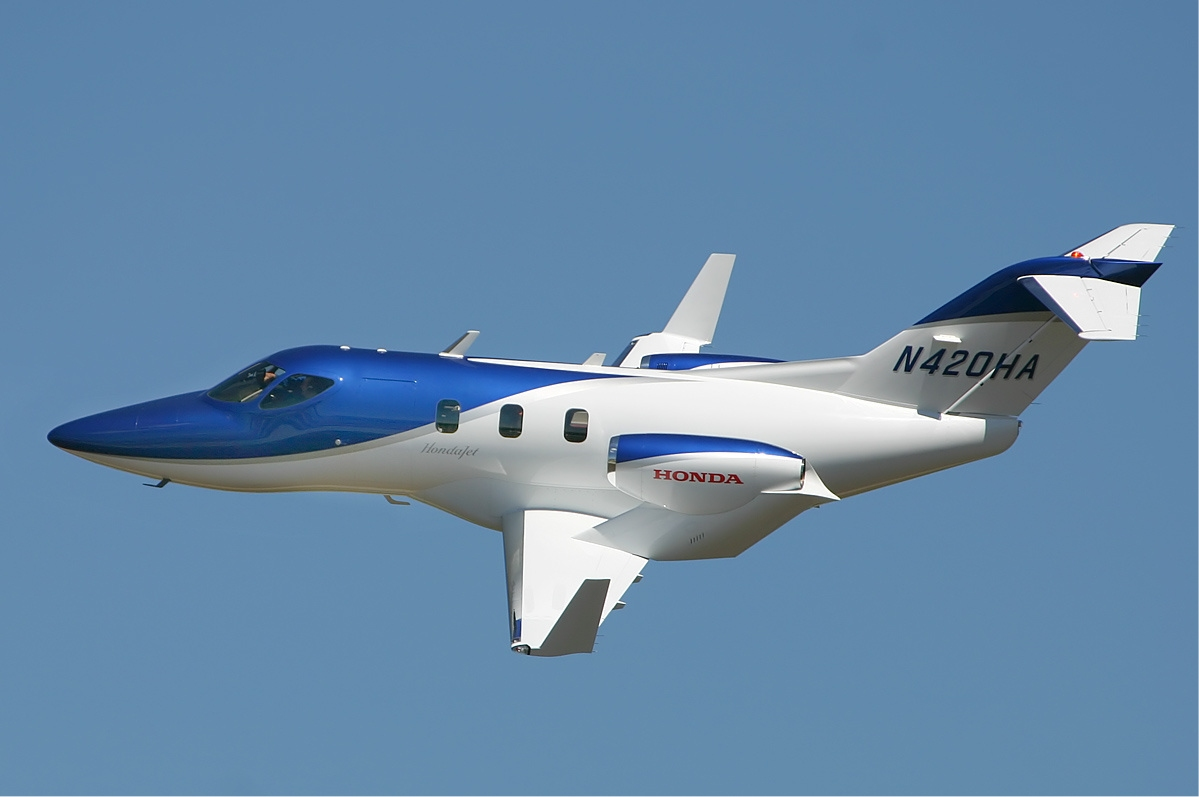
Honda HA-420 light business jet

In 2000, Fujino and a small team of engineers began work on the HondaJet prototype at the Piedmont International Airport in Greensboro, North Carolina. On December 3, 2003, the proof-of-concept HondaJet conducted its first successful test flight. In 2006, Fujino was able to convince then-Honda CEO Takeo Fukui to commercialize the HondaJet program. Honda created Honda Aircraft Company, with Fujino appointed as company president and CEO. Between 2006 and 2015, Fujino focused on the dual tasks of developing a company and preparing his proof-of-concept aircraft for FAA type certification. Deliveries of the HondaJet officially began in late 2015 after FAA type-certification was obtained.

=== 2015–2022 ===
Fujino has received several awards for his contributions to aeronautical research and design. In 2015, he was inducted into the Living Legends of Aviation after winning the “Aviation Industry Leader of the Year Award” the previous year. In 2014, Fujino received the International Council of the Aeronautical Sciences (ICAS) “Award for Innovation in Aeronautics.” He received the SAE International “Clarence L. (Kelly) Johnson Aerospace Vehicle Design and Development Award” in 2013, and the American Institute of Aeronautics and Astronautics (AIAA) “Aircraft Design Award” in 2012. Fujino is the first individual to receive all four of these awards. He later received the AIAA Reed Aeronautics Award in 2021.

Fujino’s business activities as an entrepreneur have also attracted attention. In 2018, Harvard Business School professor Gary Pisano published a case study that analyzed Fujino’s business development of the HondaJet program; this was later incorporated into Pisano’s 2019 monograph Creative Construction. In 2019, another Harvard Business School professor, Hirotaka Takeuchi, discussed Fujino’s business leadership in his work The Wise Company.

In February 2022, Honda Aircraft announced that Fujino will retire as president and CEO of the company on April 1, and that Honda Motor vice president Hideto Yamasaki will assume leadership of Honda Aircraft upon Fujino's departure. It was revealed that in March, he will reach Honda’s mandatory retirement age of 62, but would continue as a consultant for Honda Aircraft following his retirement.

== Works ==
=== Bibliography ===
- 2013. Case Study 4, HondaJet (615-647): Fundamentals of Aircraft and Airship Design, Vol.2, Leland M. Nicolai and Grant E. Carichner; Published by American Institute of Aeronautics and Astronautics for the AIAA Education Series ISBN 978-1-60086-898-6.
- 2012. Aeronautical and Space Sciences Japan, Vol.60, No.4, Development of the HondaJet.
- 2005. Journal of Aircraft 0021-8669 Vol.42 No.3 (755-764): Design and Development of the HondaJet.
- 2005. Proceedings: The 36th JSASS Annual Meeting: Design and Development of the HondaJet.
- 2004. ICAS 2004-1.7.2: Development of the HondaJet.
- 2004. ICAS 2004-4.10.1: Initial Flight Testing of the HondaJet.
- 2003. Journal of Aircraft 0021-8669 Vol.40 No.4 (609-615): Natural-Laminar-Flow Airfoil Development for a Lightweight Business Jet.
- 2003. Journal of Aircraft 0021-8669 Vol.40 No.6 (1177-1184): Wave-Drag Characteristics of an Over-the-Wing Nacelle Business-Jet Configuration.
- 2003. AIAA-2003-1942: Flutter Characteristics of an Over-the-Wing Engine Mount Business Jet Configuration.
