= Honda Aero =

Subsidiary of Honda Motor Co.

Honda Aero, Inc.
- Company type: Subsidiary
- Industry: Aviation
- Founded: October 2004; 21 years ago
- Headquarters: Burlington, North Carolina, United States
- Key people: Shinji Tsukiyama (President)
- Products: Aircraft
- Number of employees: 70 (2013)
- Parent: Honda Motor Co., Ltd
- Website: world.honda.com/hondajet

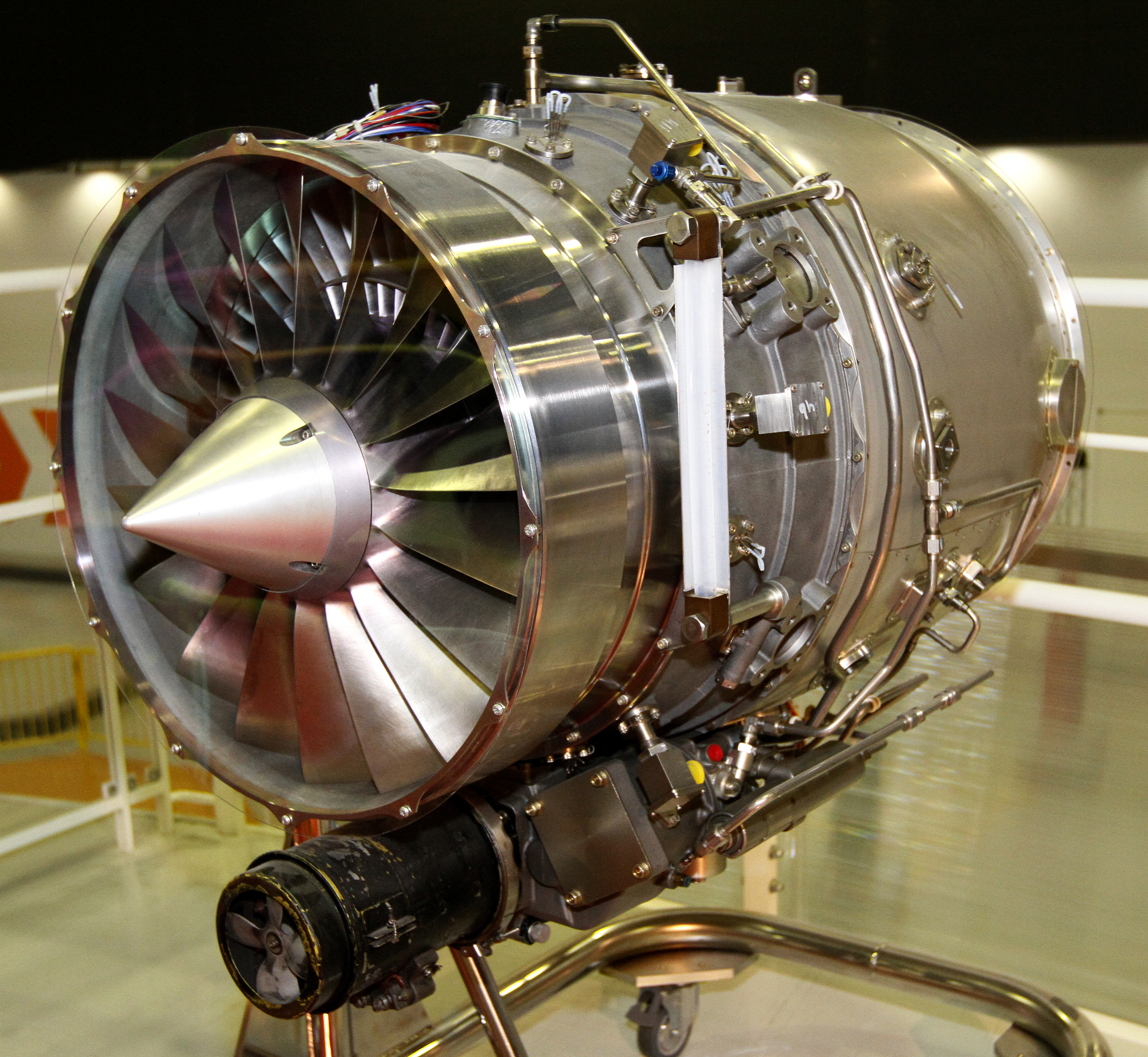
HFX-01 (1995)

Honda Aero, Inc. (HAI), a wholly owned subsidiary of Honda Motor Co., Ltd., is headquartered in Burlington, North Carolina, near the Burlington - Alamance Regional Airport. The Burlington facility will serve as the primary production location for engines developed and marketed by GE Honda Aero Engines, LLC (a joint venture between Honda Aero and GE), beginning with the GE Honda HF120 turbofan engine. Development of the facility represents a $27 million capital expenditure by Honda, bringing the company's total North American capital investment to more than $9 billion. Production began with the GE Honda Aero Engine HF120 on March 17, 2015.
