= Honda Aircraft Company =

Aircraft manufacturing subsidiary of Honda Motor Company

- Type: Subsidiary
- Industry: Aviation
- Founded: August 2006; 19 years ago
- Founder: Michimasa Fujino
- Headquarters: Greensboro, North Carolina, United States
- Key people: Hideto Yamasaki (President and CEO)
- Products: Very light jets
- Number of employees: 1,200+ as of October 2014
- Parent: Honda Motor Co., Ltd
- Website: www.hondajet.com

Honda Aircraft Company is an aircraft manufacturer headquartered in Greensboro, North Carolina, responsible for the production of the HondaJet family of aircraft. Originally a secret research project within Honda R&D, Honda Aircraft Company was formed as a wholly owned subsidiary of Honda Motor Company in August 2006 under the leadership of HondaJet designer Michimasa Fujino. Honda Aircraft Company began delivering aircraft to customers in late 2015, and by the first half of 2017 its HondaJet had become the top-selling twin-engine light business jet.

Honda Aircraft has introduced a number of innovations in general aviation (GA) jet aircraft, including an over-wing engine mount, natural laminar flow wings, and carbon composite fuselage. The engine placement in particular overcame the limitations of earlier designs, allowing for reduced wave drag, and increased cabin and baggage space. Honda Aircraft Company was also the first aircraft manufacturer to collaborate with Garmin to develop glass cockpits for GA jet aircraft. In recognition for its contributions to aircraft design and business aviation, Honda Aircraft Company was awarded the AIAA Foundation Award for Excellence in 2018.

== History ==
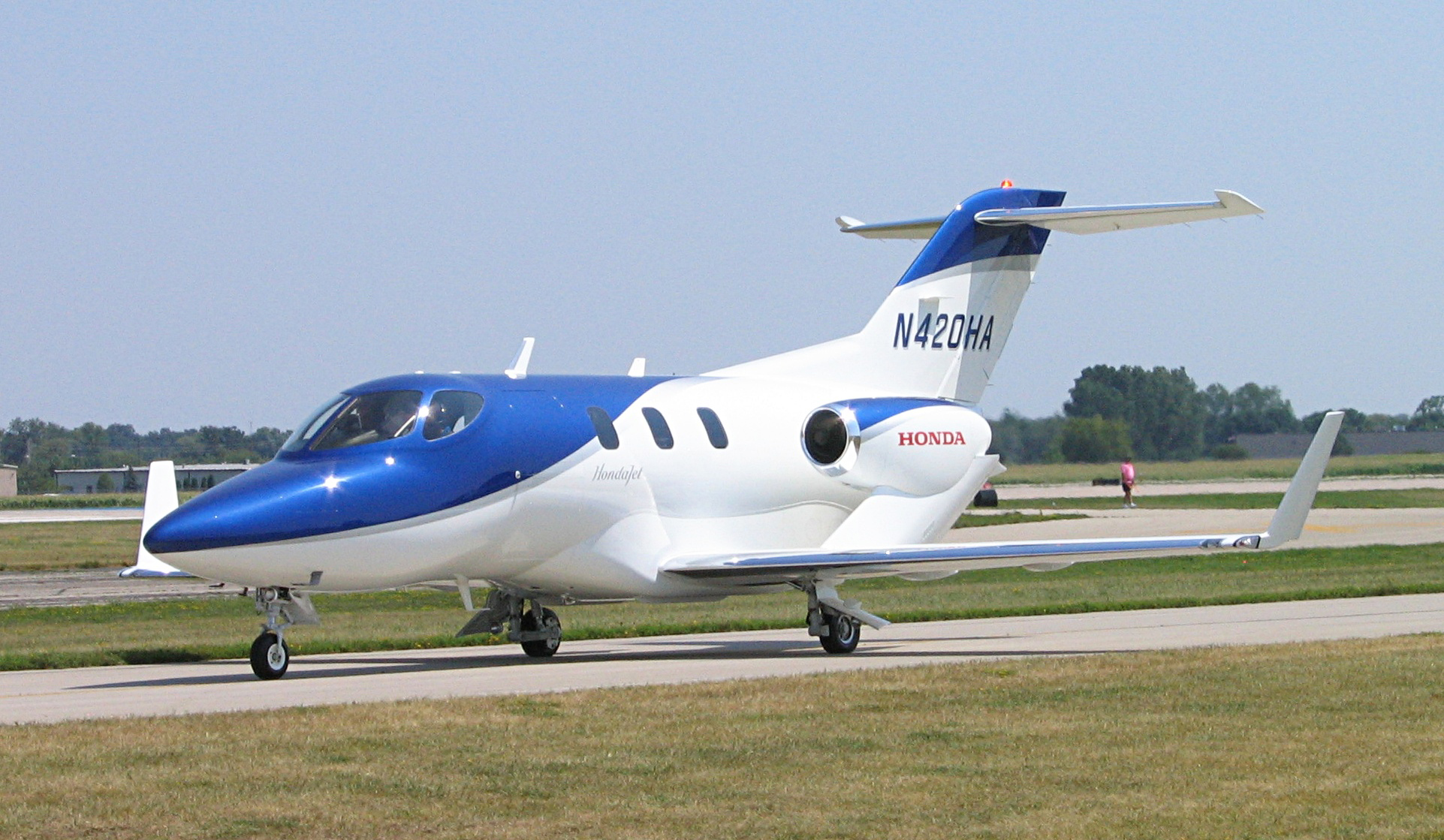
Honda HA-420 HondaJet in 2006

Honda’s aircraft research began as a top-secret research project within Honda R&D in 1986. The project was initially just a team of four engineers as Honda built up its aviation division from scratch. Lead designer Michimasa Fujino first developed the concept for the flagship “HondaJet” in 1997, and development began in 2000 when the engineering team relocated to the Piedmont Triad International Airport in Greensboro, North Carolina. Until 2005, the HondaJet team operated out of a single hangar, and kept press releases to a minimum. The proof-of-concept HondaJet first flew on December 8, 2003. In 2006, twenty years after the research project began, Honda Aircraft Company was founded as a wholly owned subsidiary of Honda Motor.

Honda Aircraft Company’s first aircraft, the HondaJet, introduced a number of technological innovations to business aviation. The most notable is the over-wing engine mount, which improves aerodynamics and allows for a longer, quieter cabin by removing the engines from the wings. Past attempts at over-wing engine placement resulted in unacceptable drag at high speeds. In contrast, the HondaJet’s engines are placed in such a way as to actually reduce drag by combining the airflow around the engine with that over the wing. Honda Aircraft also achieved a natural laminar flow wing design by constructing the HondaJet wing out of a single piece of aluminum, thereby minimizing the number of parts capable of obstructing airflow. It also uses an entirely carbon composite fuselage, which both reduces aircraft weight and allows for improved airflow over the fuselage. In recognition of these accomplishments, Honda Aircraft Company received several awards, such as the AIAA Foundation Award for Excellence in 2018 and the Flying Innovation Award from Flying Magazine in 2017.

After Honda decided to commercialize the HondaJet program, Fujino was tasked with transforming his small research team of thirty engineers into a large-scale company capable of aircraft manufacture and providing long-term customer support. Fujino searched for employees from across the world, eventually creating an international, multi-lingual staff. Between 2006 and 2015, Honda Motors invested over $200 million to expand the Honda Aircraft Company facilities from a single hangar to an over 133-acre campus consisting of an R&D center, manufacturing plant, customer service center, and office headquarters. As of 2024, the company has delivered over 250 of their aircraft to customers in over 40 countries. Honda Aircraft Company and its CEO Michimasa Fujino served as a case study for Harvard Business School professor Gary Pisano, who in his 2019 book Creative Construction classifies Honda Aircraft as an example of start-up like behavior within a large, established corporation.

In 2015, the Honda Aircraft Company received type certification for its first aircraft, the HondaJet. The first delivery occurred on December 23, 2015. In 2018, the company introduced the HondaJet Elite, which featured upgraded avionics, increased range, and an optional galley. That same year, Honda Aircraft Company began offering the HondaJet APMG to existing HondaJet customers, which provided many of the upgrades seen in the HondaJet Elite. In May 2021, the company announced the HondaJet Elite S, which improved on the Elite’s avionics system, maximum takeoff weight, and range.

After receiving FAA type-certification in 2015, over the next few years Honda Aircraft Company expanded its sales operations to many other countries.

In 2018, Honda Aircraft Company began partnering with other companies to provide aircraft for charter.

On May 20, 2019, Honda Aircraft Company announced that they were building a new 15.5 million dollar facility in Greensboro N.C., which was completed in September 2020.

In October 2021, Honda Aircraft unveiled the HondaJet 2600 Concept, a new aircraft concept, during the 2021 NBAA Convention held in Las Vegas. This concept design uses many of the elements of the original HondaJet, such as the over-wing engine placement, but features a larger cabin with room for 11 passengers and a longer range of 2,625 nm (4,862 km). Honda Aircraft announced the HondaJet 2600 Concept to determine market interest, and subsequently announced the commercialization of the concept on June 13, 2023.

In February 2022, Honda Aircraft announced that founder Michimasa Fujino would retire as president and CEO of the company on April 1, and that Honda Motor vice president Hideto Yamasaki would assume leadership of Honda Aircraft upon the retirement of Fujino, who would continue as a consultant for the company.

In October 2023, Honda Aircraft named the Honda 2600 Concept the HondaJet Echelon during the 2023 NBAA Convention in Las Vegas. The development timeline for the project includes construction beginning in early 2024, with the first flight planned in 2026 and certification anticipated in 2028.

Oct. 17, 2025, Honda Aircraft Company announced that it had successfully completed a test flight of a HondaJet using a 100% blend of Sustainable Aviation Fuel (SAF). With this flight, Honda Aircraft became the first manufacturer of twin-turbine very light business jets to operate entirely on SAF. The company described the achievement as an important step in its ongoing efforts to explore cleaner fuel alternatives and reduce the environmental footprint of business aviation. Honda Aircraft noted that the test demonstrates both the viability of SAF and its commitment to supporting more sustainable practices within the industry.

== Aircraft ==
Summary of aircraft built by Honda Aircraft Company
Model name	Type Certified	Type
Hondajet	2015	Twin-engine light business jet, 6-passenger
HondaJet APMG	2018	Twin-engine light business jet, 6-passenger
HondaJet Elite	2018	Twin-engine light business jet, 8-passenger
HondaJet Elite II	2022	Twin-engine light business jet, 8-passenger
HondaJet Echelon		Twin-engine light business jet, 10-passenger
