= GE Honda HF120 =

Turbofan manufactured in Japan and the US

HF120
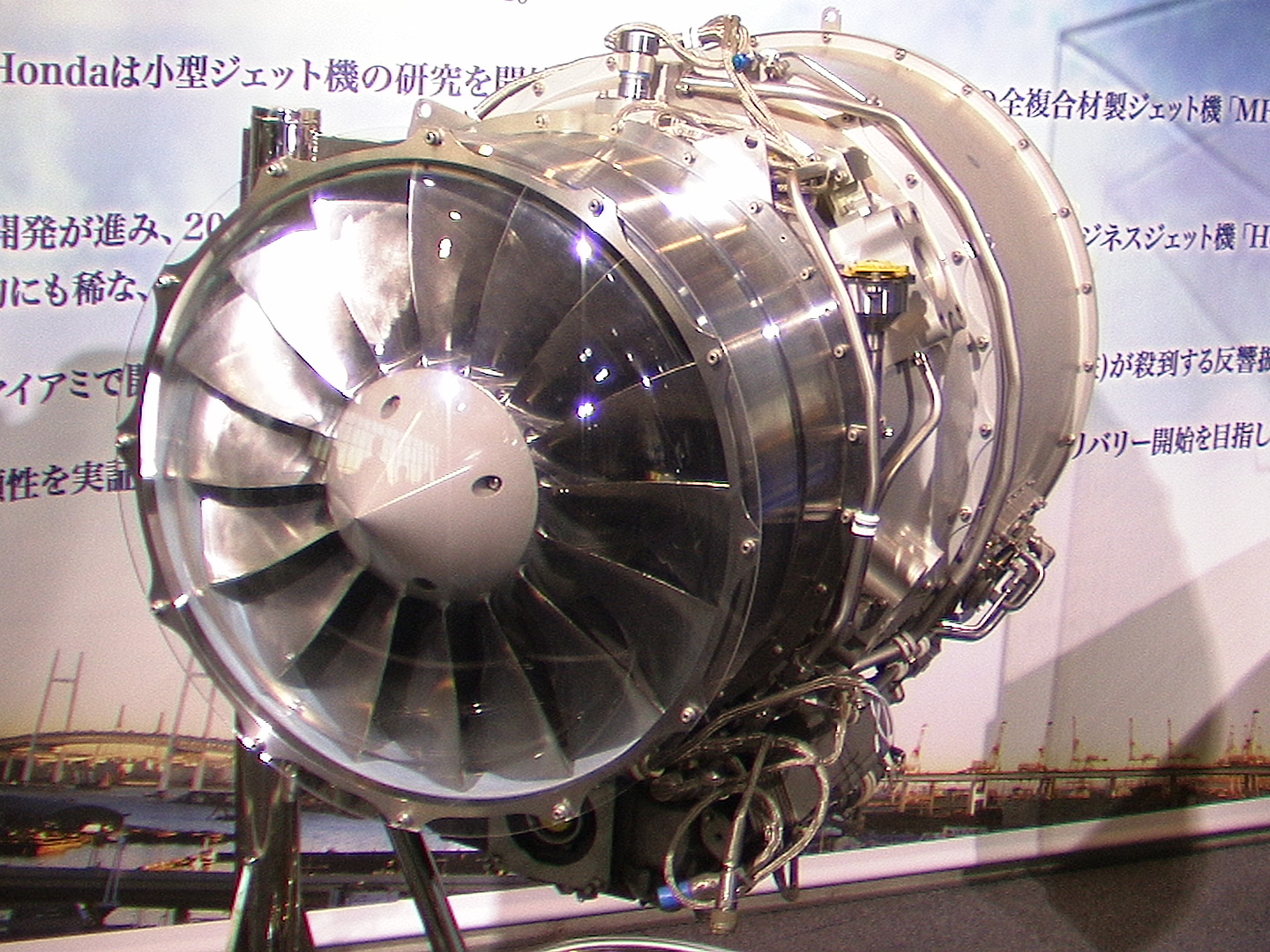
- Type: Turbofan
- National origin: Japan/United States
- Manufacturer: GE Honda Aero Engines
- First run: 2009
- Major applications: Honda HA-420 HondaJet

The GE Honda HF120 is a small turbofan engine for the light business jet market, the first engine to be produced by GE Honda Aero Engines.

== Development ==
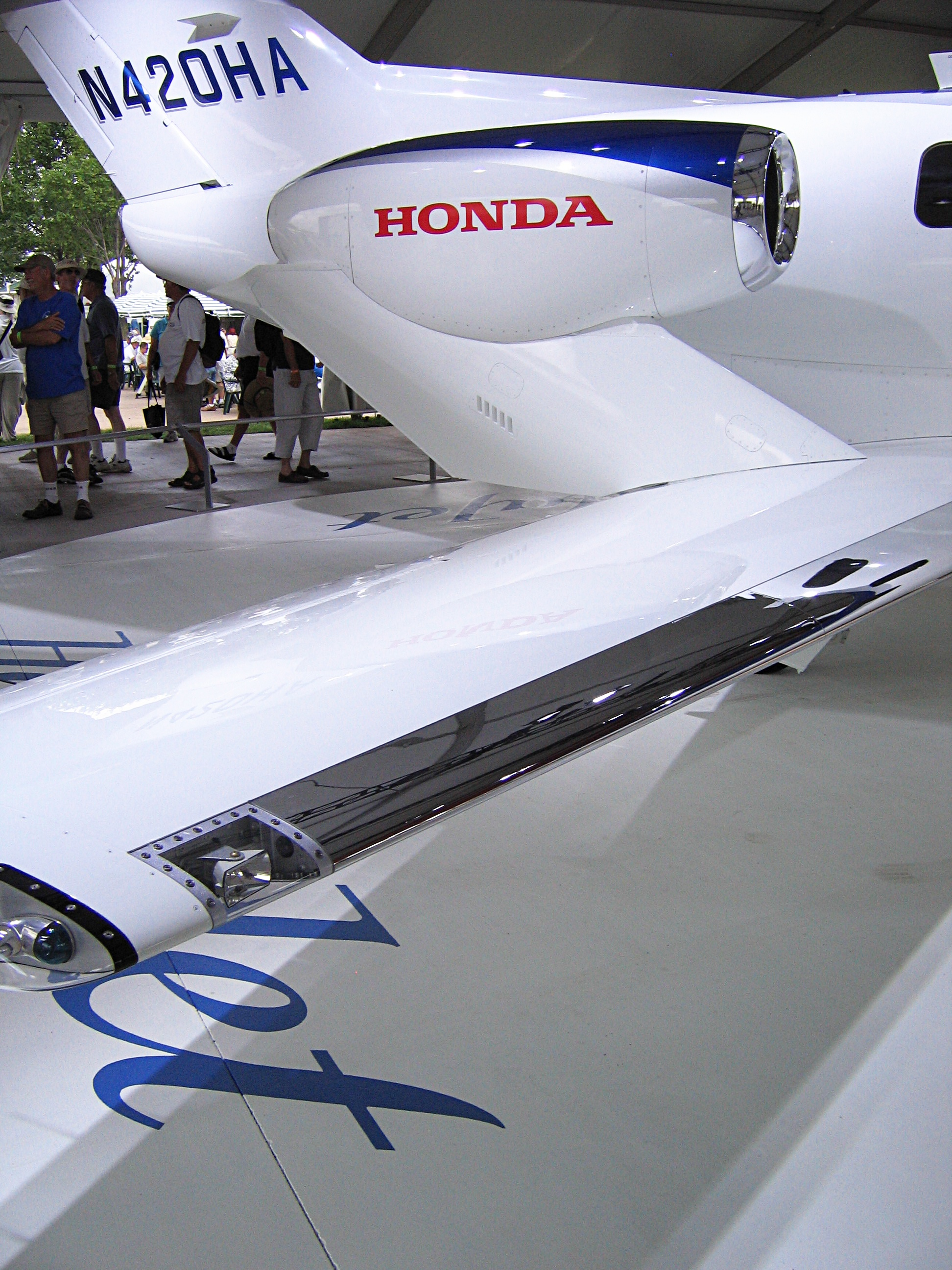
An HF120 engine mounted above the wing of a Honda HA-420 HondaJet

Succeeding Honda's original HF118 prototype, the HF120 was undergoing testing in July 2008, with certification targeted for late 2009. The first engines were produced at GE's factory, but in November 2014 production shifted to Burlington, North Carolina. The U.S. Federal Aviation Administration (FAA) awarded Part 33 certification to the HF120 turbofan engine in December 2013, and production certification in 2015.

== Design ==
The engine has a wide-chord swept fan, two-stage low-pressure compressor and counter rotating high-pressure compressor based on a titanium impeller, for a 2,050 lbf (9.1 kN) takeoff thrust. The HF120 engine's components interact with greater efficiency by incorporating 3D aerodynamic design, and its effusion-cooled combustor design emits low NOx, CO and HC. Noise levels are quieter than Stage 4 requirements.

In May 2016 time between overhaul was 2,500 h, which was expected to mature to 5,000 h; a midlife hot-section inspection is not required, and it is expected to remain on wing 40% longer than other engines and have lower operating costs.

== Operational history ==
Besides the HondaJet, HF120 was announced as a retrofit to the Cessna CitationJet CJ1 by Sierra Industries, in partnership with GE Honda.

== Applications ==
- Honda HA-420 HondaJet
- Spectrum S-40 Freedom

== Specifications ==
Data from Honda

==== General characteristics ====
- Type: Turbofan engine
- Length: 59.5 in (151 cm) (end-to-end)
- Diameter: 25.8 in (66 cm)
- Dry weight: 211.3 kg (466 lb) with basic accessories and optional equipment

==== Components ====
- Compressor: One wide-chord fan, two axial LP stages, one centrifugal HP stage.
- Combustors: Compact reverse flow annular
- Turbine: One axial HP stage (48,777 rpm), two axial LP stages (19,055 rpm).

==== Performance ====
- Maximum thrust: 2,050 lbf (9.1 kN) (Takeoff)
- Overall pressure ratio: 24:1
- Bypass ratio: 2.9:1
- Turbine inlet temperature: 1,580 °F (860 °C) (Takeoff)
- Specific fuel consumption: <0.7 lb/lbf/h (71 kg/kN/h)
- Thrust-to-weight ratio: 4.4

== See also ==
Related lists

- List of aircraft engines
