= GE Honda Aero Engines =

Joint venture

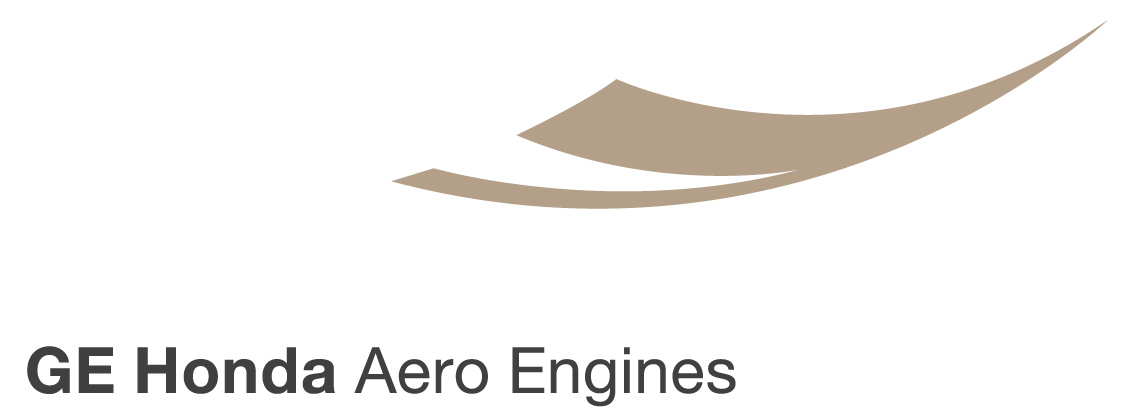
- Type: Joint venture
- Industry: Aerospace
- Founded: 2004; 22 years ago
- Headquarters: Cincinnati, Ohio, United States
- Key people: Melvyn Heard (President); Shinji Tsukiyama (Executive Vice President)
- Products: Aircraft engines
- Owners: GE Aerospace (50%); Honda Aero (50%)
- Website: www.gehonda.com

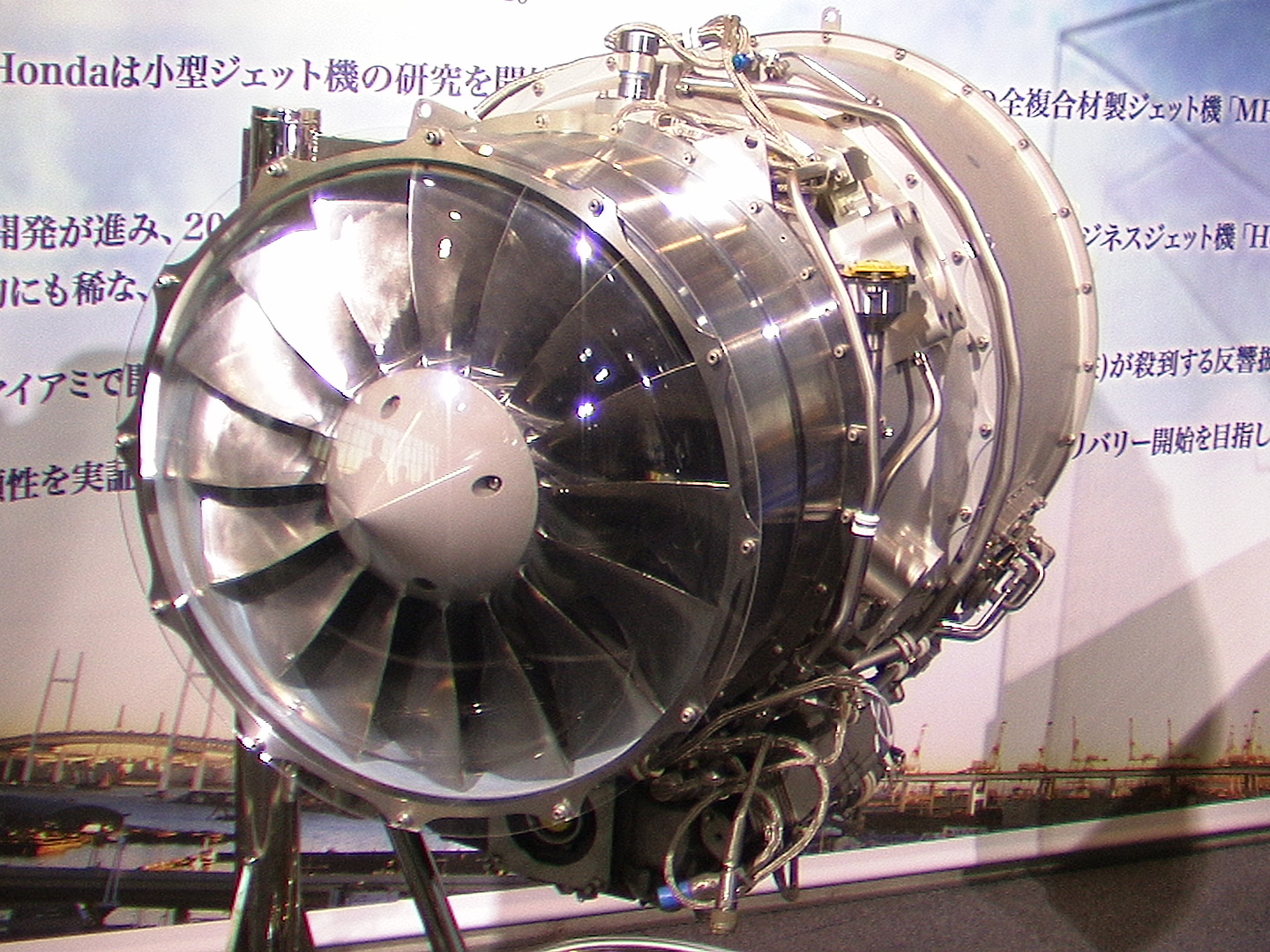
HF120

GE Honda Aero Engines LLC is a joint venture between GE Aerospace and Honda Aero based in Cincinnati, Ohio. GE Honda is headed by Melvyn Heard of GE Aerospace and Shinji Tsukiyama of Honda Aero. Formed in 2004, the company plans to create jet engines in the 1,000 to 3,500 lbf (4.4 to 15.6 kN) thrust class, suitable for the business aviation industry.

== Products ==
- GE Honda HF120
