= Honda MH02 =

1990s experimental business jet by Honda

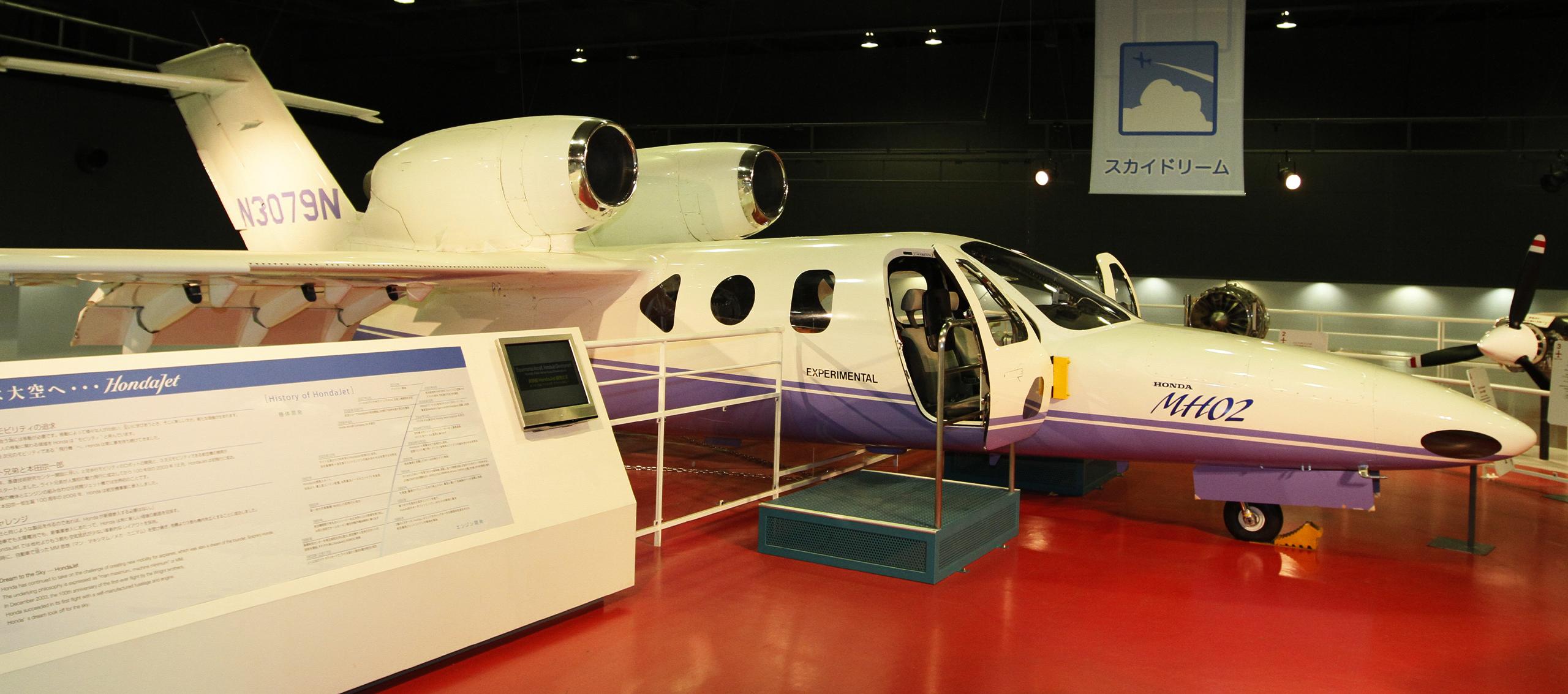
- The Honda MH02 on display at the Honda Fan Fun Lab in Motegi, Japan

General information
- Type: Experimental aircraft
- Manufacturer: Honda; Mississippi State University
- Status: Retired
- Number built: 1

History
- First flight: 5 March 1993

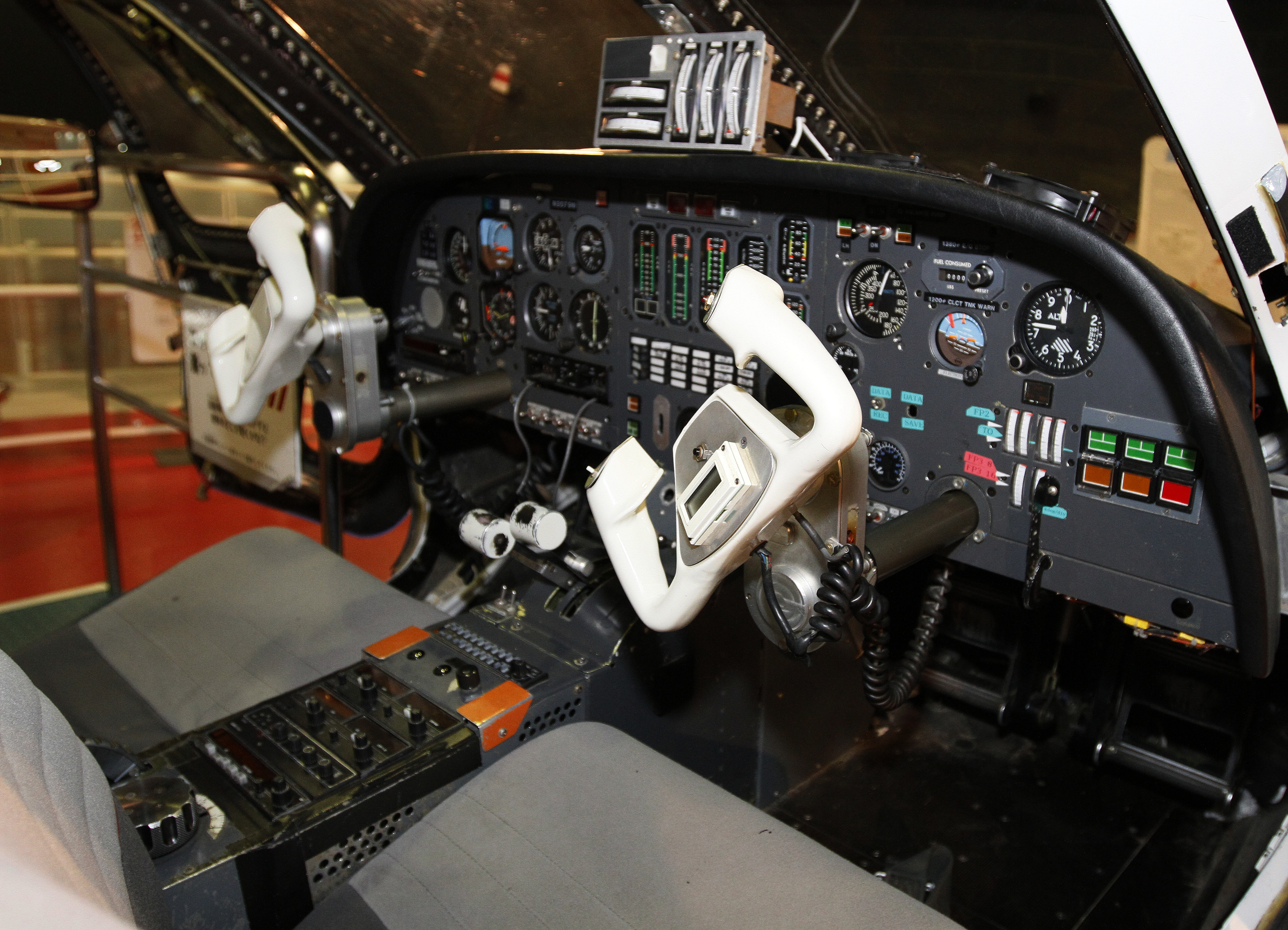
The cockpit of the Honda MH02

The Honda MH02 was an experimental business jet built by Honda, in cooperation with Mississippi State University, to research engine placement and composite construction. The prototype was completed in 1992, making its first flight on 5 March 1993.

The MH02 was never intended for production, but was nonetheless the first all-composite light business jet to fly; by 1996 over 170 test flight hours were accumulated on the airframe. Aside from the already unusual above-the-wing engine mounts, the design features a T-tail and a forward-swept wing. The aircraft was deregistered and exported to Japan in 1998.

== Specifications (MH02) ==
General characteristics

- Crew: one or two pilots
- Capacity: six passengers
- Length: 11.25 m (36 ft 11 in)
- Wingspan: 11.24 m (36 ft 11 in)
- Height: 4.18 m (13 ft 9 in)
- Max takeoff weight: 3,600 kg (7,937 lb)
- Powerplant: 2 × Pratt & Whitney Canada JT15D1 turbofan engines, 5.3 kN (1,200 lbf) thrust each

Performance

- Maximum speed: 654 km/h (406 mph, 353 kn)

== See also ==
- VFW-Fokker 614: Twin overwing jet engines
- HFB 320 Hansa Jet: Forward-swept wing
